= Prospect Hill Cemetery (North Omaha, Nebraska) =

Cemetery in Omaha, Nebraska, USA

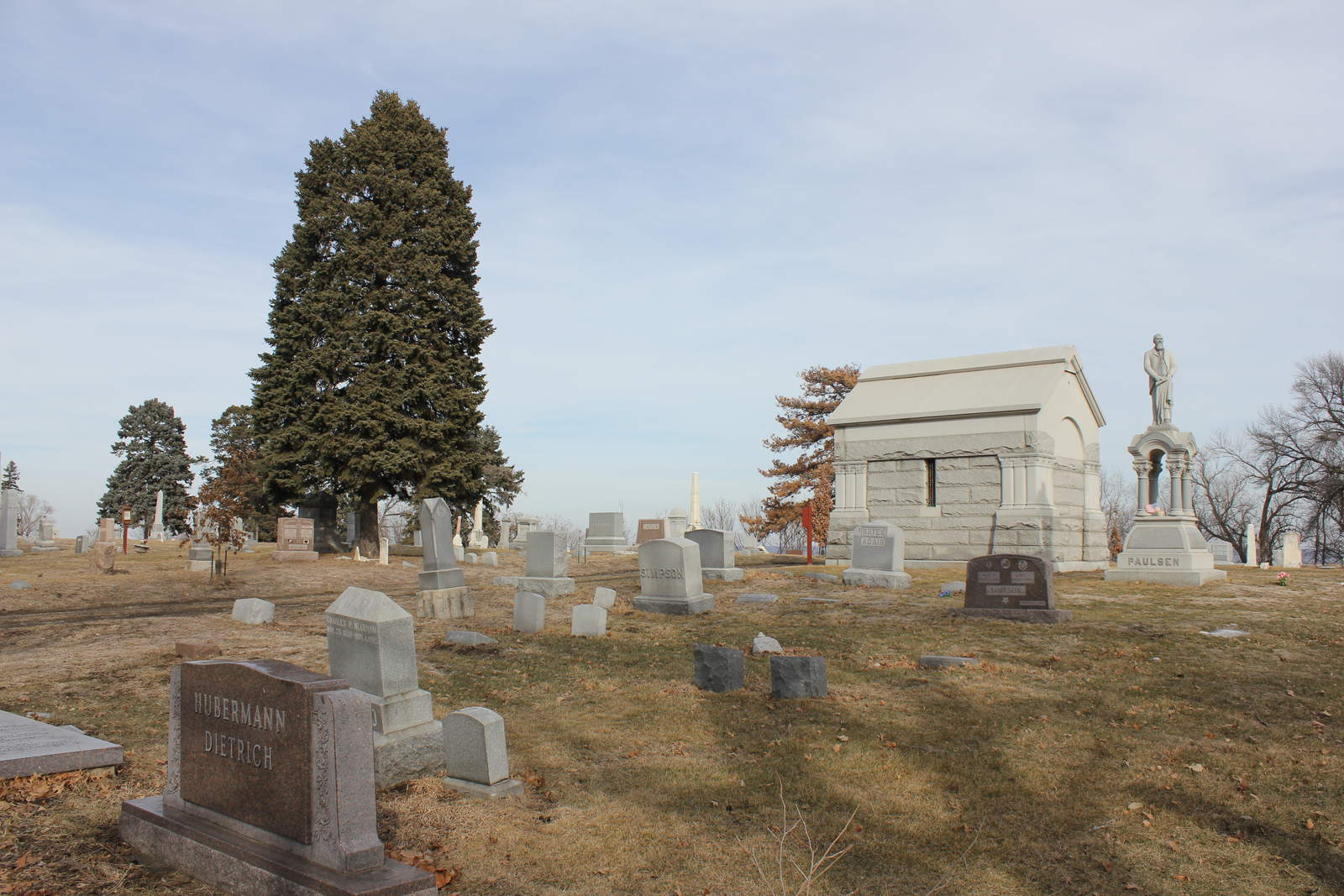
- Interactive map of Prospect Hill Cemetery

Details
- Established: 1856
- Location: Omaha, Nebraska
- Country: United States of America
- Coordinates: 41°16′41″N 95°57′36″W
- Type: Public
- Owned by: Prospect Hill Cemetery Historical Site Development Foundation
- Size: 13.84 acres (5.60 ha)
- No. of graves: 15,000
- Website: www.prospecthillomaha.org

Omaha Landmark
- Designated: June 19, 1979
- Find a Grave: Prospect Hill Cemetery

The Prospect Hill Cemetery, located at 3202 Parker Street in the Prospect Hill neighborhood of North Omaha, Nebraska, United States, is believed to be the oldest pioneer cemetery in Omaha. It is between 31st and 33rd Streets and Parker and Grant Streets.

== History ==
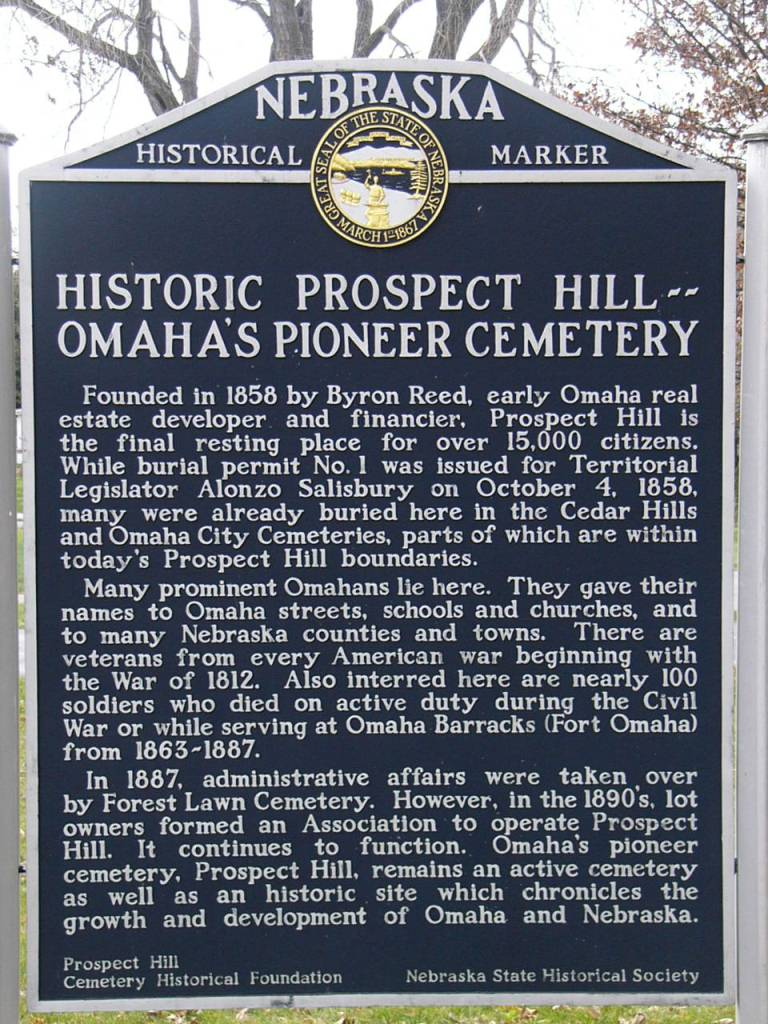
State Historical Marker

While laying out "Shinn's Addition" northwest of Omaha in 1856, Moses F. Shinn set aside 10 acres (40,000 m^{2}) for a cemetery on land where Native Americans and Mormons had reportedly been buried earlier. The location was reportedly one mile from the Mormon Trail. That year he sold the land to Byron Reed, an early Omaha real estate broker. Jesse Lowe, the first mayor of Omaha, set aside those 10 acres (40,000 m^{2}) of land for burial purposes in 1858. The new cemetery included a variety of lands, including the city original cemeteries called Cedar Hills and Omaha City Cemeteries. Parts of those cemeteries are still in Prospect Hill boundaries.

The cemetery's first official burial was in June 1858. Alonzo F. Salisbury, Omaha pioneer and member of the Nebraska Territorial Legislature, was the first person buried there. Early Omaha real estate agent Byron Reed ran the cemetery early, and sold it with the establishment of the Prospect Hill Cemetery Association in 1858. The next year, 1859, the cemetery grew to 20 acres (81,000 m^{2}). The site of the Cemetery was further made available after the 1870 trial of Baker v. Morton, in which courts ruled against Omaha's land barons and the city's claim club. The land was enlarged again in 1890, when the Prospect Hill Cemetery Association was founded. Soon Prospect Hill was 35 acres (140,000 m^{2}).

Many of Omaha's early business leaders and politicians are buried in the cemetery. There were approximately 15,000 burials recorded at Prospect Hill, including those of many Omaha pioneers, including influential developers, religious leaders, mayors, judges, and benefactors, for whom Omaha streets, parks and schools were named. The cemetery has many interesting monuments and a special section for soldiers from Fort Omaha, and it also has graves for at least 360 early African American Omahans.

In the 1880s the Forest Lawn Cemetery opened seven miles (11 km) from Prospect Hill, and eventually Reed sold Prospect Hill to the Forest Lawn Cemetery Association.

Prospect Hill was designated a landmark by the City of Omaha in 1979. There is a chapel constructed of rough brick and accented in stone, and a Tudor-Revival gatehouse located on Parker Street. The cemetery was designated as a local landmark in 1979.

== Notable interments ==
Many of Omaha's pioneer families are buried at Prospect Hill. Some of the family names include Deuel, Gaylord, Hall, Hanscom, Kennard, Krug, Lake, Lowe, McCague, Metz, Redick, and Reed. There are also many other notable people interred at Prospect Hill. There are also monuments to Spanish–American War veterans and the gravesite of at least one Buffalo Soldier, Sergeant Allen McClare.

Notable interments at Prospect Hill Cemetery
Name	Place of birth	Date of birth	Occupation	Place of death	Date of death	Notes and References
Dan Allen	New York	1832	Gambler, businessman	Omaha	April 1884	
George P. Anthes	Frankfurt, Germany	October 30, 1856	Candidate in primary for Nebraska state auditor, 1908	Omaha	June 15, 1936	
George Robert Armstrong		August 1, 1819	Mayor of Omaha, 1858–59, 1861–62	Omaha	April 20, 1896	
William M. Brewer			Mayor of Omaha, 1873–74	Omaha	September 12, 1921	
Clinton Briggs		October 17, 1828	Member of Nebraska territorial House of Representatives, 1858; mayor of Omaha, 1860–61; delegate to Nebraska state constitutional convention, 1875.	Iowa	December 19, 1882	Hit by a train and died.
Smith Samuel Caldwell		September 4, 1834	Mayor of Omaha, 1871–72	Omaha	June 26, 1884	
Champion S. Chase	Cornish, New Hampshire	March 20, 1820	Lawyer; Member of the Wisconsin State Senate, 1857–58; Mayor of Omaha, Nebraska, 1874–77, 1878–81, 1883–84; 1st Attorney General of Nebraska, 1867–68	Omaha, Nebraska	November 3, 1898	Chase County, Nebraska, and the unincorporated community of Champion in Chase County, are named after him
William James Connell	Cowansville, Quebec	July 6, 1846	U.S. Representative from Nebraska's 1st congressional district, 1889–91	Atlantic City, New Jersey	August 16, 1924	
Thomas B. Cuming			Secretary of Nebraska Territory, 1854–58; Governor of Nebraska Territory, 1854–55, 1857–58.	Omaha	March 23, 1858	Original interment at a private or family graveyard, Douglas County, Neb.; subsequent interment at Prospect Hill Cemetery; re-interment at Holy Sepulchre Cemetery. Cuming County, Nebraska is named for him.
Augustus Hall	Batavia, New York	April 29, 1814	Lawyer; U.S. Representative from Iowa's 1st district, 1855–57; justice of Nebraska territorial supreme court, 1858–61; chief justice of Nebraska territorial supreme court, 1858–61	Bellevue, Nebraska	February 1, 1861	Died in office; Hall County, Nebraska is named for him.
John B. Hawley	Hawleyville, Connecticut	February 9, 1831	U.S. Representative from Illinois, 1869–75 (4th District 1869–73, 6th District 1873–75)	Died May 24, 1895.	Omaha	
Phineas Hitchcock	New Lebanon, New York	November 30, 1831	Delegate to Republican National Convention from Nebraska, 1860; Delegate to U.S. Congress from Nebraska Territory, 1865–67; U.S. Senator from Nebraska, 1871–77	Omaha	July 10, 1881	Hitchcock County, Nebraska is named for him.
Frederick Krug	Germany	1855	Founder, Krug Brewery	Omaha	November 18, 1930	
Charles O. Lobeck	Andover, Illinois	April 6, 1852	Member of Nebraska state senate, 1893; Presidential Elector for Nebraska, 1900; U.S. Representative from Nebraska 2nd District, 1911–19.	Omaha	January 30, 1920	
Jesse Lowe		March 11, 1814	Mayor of Omaha, 1857–58.	Omaha	April 3, 1868	Original interment at Cedar Hill Cemetery (which no longer exists); re-interment in 1891 at Forest Lawn Cemetery; cenotaph at Prospect Hill Cemetery.
Frederick Metz	Germany		Founder, Metz Brewery; member of Nebraska state senate, 1871–72, 1885–86	Omaha	1901	
Ezra Millard		February 2, 1833	Mayor of Omaha, 1869–71	Omaha	August 20, 1886	
Joseph Millard	Hamilton, Ontario	April 20, 1836	Mayor of Omaha, 1872–73; U.S. Senator from Nebraska, 1901–07	Omaha	January 13, 1922	
Algernon Paddock	Glens Falls, New York	November 9, 1830	Delegate to Republican National Convention from Nebraska, 1860; secretary of Nebraska Territory, 1861–67; acting Governor of Nebraska Territory, 1861; U.S. Senator from Nebraska, 1875–81, 1887–93.	Beatrice, Nebraska	October 17, 1897	
John T. Paulsen	Ockholm, Germany	April 25, 1837	Member of Nebraska state senate, 1889	Omaha	September 3, 1889	
Andrew Jackson Poppleton		July 24, 1830	Mayor of Omaha, 1858	Omaha	September 24, 1896	
Byron Reed	Darien, New York	March 12, 1829	Real estate businessman	Omaha	June 6, 1891	
Origen D. Richardson	Vermont	July 20, 1795	Fourth Lieutenant Governor of Michigan	Omaha	November 29, 1876	
Alonzo F. Salisbury	Vermont		Stagecoach driver; miller; member of Nebraska territorial House of Representatives, 1856.	Omaha	October 4, 1858	First burial in Prospect Hill Cemetery
John Taffe	Indianapolis, Indiana	January 30, 1827	Newspaper editor; member of Nebraska territorial House of Representatives, 1858–59; member Nebraska territorial council, 1860–61; major in the Union Army during the Civil War; U.S. Representative from Nebraska at-large, 1867–73	North Platte, Nebraska	March 14, 1884	Founder, Omaha Public Library
Eleazer Wakeley	Homer, New York	June 15, 1822	Lawyer; member of Wisconsin territorial House of Representatives, 1847–48; member of Wisconsin Senate, 1851–55; justice of Nebraska territorial supreme court, 1857–61; delegate to Nebraska state constitutional convention, 1871; district judge in Nebraska 3rd District, 1883–92; appointed 1883	Omaha	November 21, 1912	
Reuben H. Wilbur		April 26, 1825	Mayor of Omaha, 1877–79	Omaha	April 4, 1896	
Anna Wilson		May 27, 1835	Brothel owner	Omaha	October 27, 1911	A polished stone in the dimensions of a king-size bed with four posts rests over the double graves of Wilson and Dan Allen.

== See also ==
- List of cemeteries in Omaha
- Landmarks in Omaha, Nebraska
