= Champion S. Chase =

American politician (1820–1898)

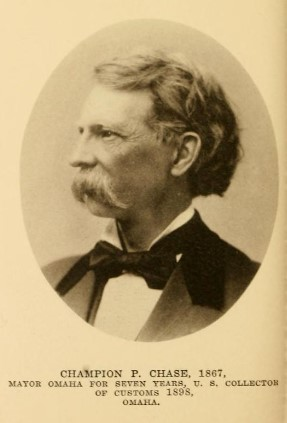

1st Attorney General of Nebraska
- In office February 21, 1867 – January 7, 1869
- Governor: David Butler
- Preceded by: Position Established
- Succeeded by: Seth Robinson

17th, 19th, and 21st Mayor of Omaha, Nebraska
- In office April 10, 1883 – June 30, 1884
- Preceded by: James E. Boyd
- Succeeded by: Patrick F. Murphy
- In office April 7, 1879 – April 12, 1881
- Preceded by: Reuben H. Wilbur
- Succeeded by: James E. Boyd
- In office April 13, 1874 – April 9, 1877
- Preceded by: James S. Gibson
- Succeeded by: Reuben H. Wilbur

Member of the Wisconsin Senate from the 7th district
- In office January 5, 1857 – January 3, 1859
- Preceded by: Charles Clement
- Succeeded by: Nicholas D. Fratt

District Attorney of Racine County, Wisconsin
- In office January 1, 1859 – January 1, 1861
- Preceded by: William P. Lyon
- Succeeded by: N. H. Dale

President of the Board of Education of Racine, Wisconsin
- In office 1857–1858
- Preceded by: Edwin Gould
- Succeeded by: Chester White
- In office 1855–1856
- Preceded by: Charles Clement
- Succeeded by: Edwin Gould

Personal details
- Born: March 20, 1820 Cornish, New Hampshire, U.S.
- Died: November 3, 1898 (aged 78) Omaha, Nebraska, U.S.
- Resting place: Prospect Hills Cemetery; Omaha, Nebraska
- Party: Republican; Whig (before 1854)
- Spouse: Mary Sophronia Butterfield (m. 1849; died 1882)
- Children: Champion Clement Chase^{(b. 1860; died 1922)}
- Parents: Deacon Clement Chase (father); Olive Spalding (mother)
- Relatives: Olive Spaulding (Chase) Judson (sister); Enice Dana Chase (sister); Philemon Murry Chase (brother); Salmon P. Chase (cousin)
- Profession: lawyer and politician

Military service
- Allegiance: United States
- Branch/service: Wisconsin Militia; United States Army; Union Army
- Rank: Brig. General, Wis. Major, USA; Brevet Lt. Colonel, USA
- Battles/wars: American Civil War: Siege of Vicksburg; Knoxville Campaign; Mobile Campaign; Gulf Campaign

Champion Spalding Chase (March 20, 1820 – November 3, 1898) was an American lawyer, politician, and pioneer of Wisconsin and Nebraska. He was the first Attorney General of Nebraska and served seven years as mayor of Omaha, Nebraska. He also served two years in the Wisconsin Senate, representing Racine County, Wisconsin, and served as a Union Army officer during the American Civil War. His name was sometimes abbreviated as C. S. Chase. He was a first cousin of U.S. Supreme Court chief justice Salmon P. Chase.

== Early life and career ==
Champion Chase was born in Cornish, New Hampshire, and raised there on his father's farm and obtained his primary education in the a common school. He was then sent to the Kimball Union Academy in Meriden, New Hampshire, and returned to teach school in Cornish for three winters. In 1841 he was employed as a teacher at the Academy in Amsterdam, New York. After two years, he moved to Otsego County, New York, where he was hired as a vice principal at the West Hartwich Seminary.

In the mid-1840s, he went to Buffalo, New York, where he studied law at the office of Barker & Sill for three years. While studying there, he was appointed by the governor of New York, John Young, to serve as a delegate to the National River and Harbor Convention in Chicago. That same year, he was admitted to the bar at Canandaigua, New York.

The next year, he went west to the new state of Wisconsin, opening a law office in Racine, Wisconsin, on May 1, 1848, in partnership with Moses Butterfield.

== Wisconsin politics ==
In Wisconsin, Chase became involved in politics as a member of the Whig Party. He was the Whig candidate for district attorney in the fall after he opened his law office, in 1848, but lost the general election. In 1850, he ran for Wisconsin Senate, but lost a close election to Free Soil Party candidate Stephen O. Bennett. He sought the Whig Party nomination for Congress in Wisconsin's 1st congressional district in 1852, but received only one vote at the convention, the nomination going to Henry S. Durand.

During this time, Chase was also involved in other nascent civic organizations. In 1853, the Wisconsin Historical Society was founded and Chase was one of the original society members. Also in 1853, he was a member of Racine's first school board. He was then a delegate to the convention which formed the state Teacher's Association (now Wisconsin Education Association Council) in the summer of 1853. In December 1853, Chase was appointed brigadier general of the second brigade, first division of the Wisconsin Militia.

In March 1854, Chase played an important role in the Joshua Glover affair. Glover had escaped slavery in Missouri and came to Racine via the underground railroad. He was recaptured in Racine by federal officials, pursuant to the Fugitive Slave Act, creating an uproar among the population. The night of Glover's capture, a meeting was held in Racine in which the city expressed its outrage. Chase was a leader of the meeting, and assigned to the committee to draft resolutions. On the issue of Glover, the resolutions declared: "we look upon the arrest of said Glover as an outrage upon the peaceful rights of this assembly" and "we, as citizens of Racine, demand for said Glover a fair and impartial jury trial, in this, the state where he has been arrested, and that we will attend in person to aid him, by all honorable means, to secure his unconditional release, adopting as our motto the Golden Rule." They further opined on the Fugitive Slave acts: "That, inasmuch as the Senate of the United States has repealed all compromises heretofore adopted by the Congress of the United States, we, as citizens of Wisconsin, are justified in declaring, and do hereby declare, the slave-catching law of 1850 disgraceful and also repealed." Later that evening, the Racine convention ultimately erupted into a mob, which stormed the jail in Milwaukee and liberated Glover.

Days later, the convention at the Little White Schoolhouse was held in Ripon, Wisconsin, where the Republican Party was founded. That summer, Chase was a delegate to a Racine County convention which again declared that they would actively disobey and thwart any attempt to enforce the fugitive slave acts, and organizing a vigilance committee to effect that policy. That fall, Chase was a candidate for Wisconsin State Assembly on the new Republican Party ticket, but he lost the general election to Democrat Thomas Falvey. He was elected president of the Racine Board of Education in 1855, and then again in 1857.

In 1856, Chase was a Wisconsin delegate to the first Republican National Convention. The convention nominated John C. Frémont as the Republican candidate for the presidency in the 1856 election. The same year, Chase was the Republican nominee for Wisconsin Senate in Wisconsin's 7th Senate district—the district then comprised just Racine County. He defeated Democratic nominee Nicholas D. Fratt in the general election and went on to serve in the 1857 and 1858 legislative terms.

During his second year in the Senate, he served as chairman of the judiciary committee and supervised the revision of the statutes of the state. In 1858, rather than running for re-election to the Senate, Chase ran for district attorney of Racine County; he defeated Nehemiah H. Joy and won a two year term. He took office in January 1859. Later that year, he was again appointed brigadier general of the Wisconsin Militia, by Governor Alexander Randall.

== Civil War service ==
In 1862, with the assistance of his cousin, Salmon P. Chase (1808–1873), who was then the United States Treasury Secretary, he was appointed paymaster in the Union Army with the rank of Major.

He served four years in the Union Army and during this time he was on special duty in the West and Southwest. He was at the sieges of Knoxville, Mobile, and Vicksburg, and in the later part of the war he was headquartered at New Orleans for nearly two years and would receive a brevet to Lieutenant Colonel from President Andrew Johnson late in 1865, for his meritorious services in the Gulf Campaign. In January 1866 he was honorably discharged.

== Nebraska ==
After mustering out of the Army in 1866, Chase moved to Omaha, in the Nebraska Territory, and resumed his law practice. He also became an investor in the incorporation of the Omaha Street Railway Co. In 1867, Nebraska would be admitted to the Union as the 37th state, and in that same year, Chase was appointed by Nebraska Governor David Butler to a two-year term as the first Attorney General of Nebraska.

In 1869, he was appointed to a six-year term as regent of the State University of Nebraska, also by Governor David Butler.

Chase was elected Mayor of Omaha in 1874, after losing an earlier attempt. He was re-elected in 1875 to a two-year term—this was the first term after Omaha's mayoralty was changed by statute from a one-year term to a two-year term. He was elected to two additional two-year terms in 1879 and 1883, but was impeached and removed from office in June 1884, due to drunkenness impairing his abilities. His wife Mary died to cancer in 1882 and many think this may have contributed to his ill health. Chase later launched quo warranto proceedings in 1887 stating that he had been illegally removed from office, and was unlawfully deprived of the salary of the mayor. The jury rendered a verdict in his favor which gave him some measure of closure.

During his terms as mayor it was recorded of him as having "favoured extensive public improvements" such as parks and boulevards, and direct and gravitational powered waterworks. As mayor, Colonel Chase received and officially entertained a large number of distinguished people—Kalākaua, King of Hawai'i; Peter II, Emperor of Brazil; the Governor General of Canada; U.S. President and Mrs. Rutherford B. Hayes; President and Mrs. Ulysses S. Grant; Generals William Tecumseh Sherman, Philip Sheridan, George Armstrong Custer, and others.

In 1871, he was elected Grand Senior Warden in the Nebraska Commandery of Knights Templar. In 1886, he was unanimously chosen president of the Nebraska State Humane Society.

Champion Chase was identified as being past commander of the U.S. Grant Post of the Grand Army of the Republic and the Sons of the American Revolution. In 1891 he was an organizer of the Omaha Real Estate Owners Association. He was selected as the chairman of the International Pan-Republic Congress on Plan and Scope in the mid 1890s. He was appointed a collector of customs for the Port of Omaha and held that office until his death in 1898.

== Family and personal life ==
Champion Chase was a son of Clement Chase (1776–1867) and his second wife, Olive Spalding (1790–1823), of Plainfield, New Hampshire. He was named for his maternal grandfather, Champion Spalding.

Chase married Mary Sophronia Butterfield on the same day he opened his law office in Racine, May 1, 1848. Their only son, Champion Clement Chase, was born in 1860, and would eventually become a well-known newspaper publisher in Omaha.

Mary Chase died of cancer in 1882, in Omaha, leaving Chase a widower. Chase died as the result of a fall on November 3, 1898, at the age of 78.

He was devoted to the memories of his native town, often expressed his loyalty and love for it. He was buried alongside his wife at the Prospect Hills Cemetery in Omaha, Nebraska.

== Legacy ==
Chase County, Nebraska, and the unincorporated community of Champion in Chase County, are named after him as a complimentary act on the part of the Legislature of Nebraska.

Wisconsin Senate
Preceded by Charles Clement	Member of the Wisconsin Senate from the 7th district January 5, 1857 – January 3, 1859	Succeeded by Nicholas D. Fratt
Political offices
Preceded by James S. Gibson	Mayor of Omaha, Nebraska; April 13, 1874 – April 9, 1877	Succeeded by Reuben H. Wilbur
Preceded by Reuben H. Wilbur	Mayor of Omaha, Nebraska; April 7, 1879 – April 12, 1881	Succeeded by James E. Boyd
Preceded by James E. Boyd	Mayor of Omaha, Nebraska; April 10, 1883 – June 30, 1884	Succeeded by Patrick F. Murphy
Legal offices
Preceded by William P. Lyon	District Attorney of Racine County, Wisconsin; January 1, 1859 – January 1, 1861	Succeeded by N. H. Dale
Office established	Attorney General of Nebraska; February 21, 1867 – January 7, 1869	Succeeded by Seth Robinson
