= Alonzo F. Salisbury =

American politician

Alonzo F. Salisbury (1808–1858) was a member of the second, third and fourth Nebraska Territorial Legislatures from 1855–1858. Salisbury is often credited as being the first burial at Omaha's Prospect Hill Cemetery, though this information is known to be incorrect.

== Biography ==
Salisbury was born in Vermont in 1808. In 1855, he came to Omaha City in the Nebraska Territory as a stagecoach driver. Within a year he started a mill. Alonzo Salisbury was a direct descendant of Jonathan Salisbury, the captain of a privateer that served in many battles during the American Revolutionary War.

== Politics ==
Salisbury was a member of the Territorial Legislature, representing Douglas County.

In 1855 he opposed the original bill to grant suffrage to women, and in 1857 he was on the committee appointed to investigate the secession of Florence from Omaha. In 1858, Salisbury became the first burial at Moses Shinn's cemetery, later known as Prospect Hill Cemetery.

== See also ==
- History of Omaha, Nebraska
- Government of Omaha
- Founding figures of Omaha, Nebraska
