= P. J. Morgan =

American politician

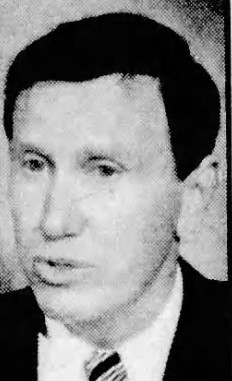

Mayor of Omaha
- In office June 5, 1989 – June 10, 1994
- Preceded by: Walt Calinger
- Succeeded by: Subby Anzaldo

Member of the Nebraska Legislature from the 4th district
- In office January 5, 1971 – December 31, 1972
- Preceded by: Henry Pedersen Jr.
- Succeeded by: Richard Fellman

Personal details
- Born: April 9, 1940 (age 86) Omaha, Nebraska
- Party: Republican

P. J. Morgan (born April 9, 1940) is a Republican politician who currently serves as a member of the Douglas County Board of Commissioners from the 4th district. Morgan served as a member of the Nebraska Legislature from 1971 to 1972, as Mayor of Omaha from 1989 to 1994, and previously served on the County Commission from 1973 to 1977.

== Early life ==
Morgan was born in 1940 in Omaha, Nebraska, and graduated from Westside High School in 1958. He attended the University of Omaha and relocated to Phoenix, Arizona, where he attended Phoenix Junior College. Morgan returned to Omaha in 1961 and opened a real estate company, which he expanded to a car-leasing business. In 1969, Morgan ran for one of the seven at-large seats on the Omaha City Council. In the primary election, he was one of the fourteen candidates who received the most votes, and advanced to the general election, and he narrowly lost the general election.

== Nebraska Legislature ==
In 1970, State Senator Henry Pedersen Jr. opted to seek the Republican nomination for Lieutenant Governor rather than seek re-election, and Morgan ran to succeed him in the 4th district. Morgan competed in a crowded primary election, and won 25 percent of the vote, advancing to the general election against John E. Everroad Jr., the son of Lieutenant Governor John Everroad, who received 34 percent. In the general election, Morgan defeated Everroad in a landslide, receiving 64 percent of the vote.

== Douglas County Board of Commissioners ==
Morgan announced that he would seek a position on the Douglas County Board of Commissioners, citing the need for "some Republican representation" on the board. He won the Republican primary, and won the general election by a wide margin. Governor J. James Exon appointed Democrat Richard Fellman as Morgan's successor. Morgan resigned effective on December 31, 1972, to enable his successor, Richard Fellman, to assume office earlier.

== 1976 congressional campaign ==
In 1976, Republican Congressman John Y. McCollister opted to unsuccessfully run for Senate rather than seek re-election, and Morgan ran to succeed him in the 2nd district. In the Republican primary, he faced Omaha City Councilman Monte Taylor, former television journalist Lee Terry, and electrical engineer Joe Moss. Morgan ultimately placed second in the primary, winning 25 percent of the vote to Terry's 47 percent. Terry went on to lose to Democrat John J. Cavanaugh.

== Mayor of Omaha ==
Morgan ran for Mayor of Omaha in 1989, challenging incumbent Walt Calinger, the interim Mayor. Former Mayor Mike Boyle, who had been recalled in 1987, placed first in the primary election, winning 27 percent of the vote. Morgan narrowly defeated Calinger for second place, receiving 21 percent of the vote to Calinger's 20 percent. Morgan ultimately defeated Boyle, 53–45 percent.

In 1993, Morgan ran for re-election to a second term. He was challenged by three little-known opponents, and won 73 percent of the vote in the primary election, the largest percentage in city history. Environmental activist Isabel Cohen placed second with 11 percent of the vote, and advanced to the general election against Morgan. Morgan defeated Cohen in a landslide, winning 75 percent of the vote to her 25 percent.

On April 27, 1994, Morgan unexpectedly announced that he would resign as mayor, effective June 10, to become the president of Duncan Aviation, a Lincoln-based company. Morgan cited his desire to spend time with his family and his interest in the business opportunity.

== Return to the Douglas County Board ==
On August 18, 2009, Douglas announced that he would run for the Douglas County Board of County Commissioners from the 4th district in 2010. He was elected unopposed, succeeding Commissioner Kyle Hutchings.

In advance of the 2011 recall election of Mayor Jim Suttle, Morgan was discussed as a possible candidate to succeed Suttle if he was recalled. However, Suttle narrowly prevailed in the election.

Morgan was re-elected to the Board without opposition in 2014, 2018, and 2022.
