= John A. McShane =

American politician (1850–1923)

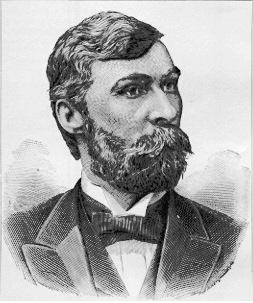
- From 1888's Omaha Illustrated

Member of the U.S. House of Representatives from Nebraska's 1st district
- In office March 4, 1887 – March 3, 1889
- Preceded by: Archibald J. Weaver
- Succeeded by: William James Connell

Personal details
- Born: John Albert McShane; August 25, 1850 New Lexington, Ohio, U.S.
- Died: November 10, 1923 (aged 73) Omaha, Nebraska, U.S.
- Resting place: Holy Sepulchre Cemetery in Omaha
- Party: Democratic

John Albert McShane (August 25, 1850 – November 10, 1923) was an American Democratic Party politician. He was the first Democrat to be elected to the United States House of Representatives from Nebraska, serving one term from 1887 to 1889.

== Early life and education ==
McShane was born in New Lexington, Ohio, on August 25, 1850. In 1871, he moved to the Wyoming Territory, and in 1874 he moved to Omaha, Nebraska.

== Career ==
He started out in the livestock business but eventually became a director of the First National Bank of Omaha.

=== Politics ===
McShane was elected to the Nebraska state house of representatives in 1880 and to the state senate in 1882, serving there until 1886, when he ran for a seat in Congress

=== Congress ===
He won the seat in Nebraska's 1st congressional district, serving in the Fiftieth United States Congress from March 4, 1887, to March 3, 1889.

In 1888, he ran for Governor of Nebraska but lost the election to John Milton Thayer.

== Later career ==
After retirement McShane worked against the right of women to vote. He was a member of the Nebraska Men's Association Opposed to Woman Suffrage, which desired to restrict voting to white men of high social class.

== Death and burial ==
McShane died in Omaha on November 10, 1923; he was buried in Holy Sepulchre Cemetery in Omaha.

Party political offices
Preceded by James E. North	Democratic nominee for Governor of Nebraska; 1888	Succeeded by James E. Boyd
U.S. House of Representatives
Preceded by Archibald J. Weaver (R)	Member of the U.S. House of Representatives from Nebraska's 1st congressional district March 4, 1887 – March 3, 1889	Succeeded by William James Connell (R)
