= Richard C. Cushing =

Richard C. Cushing may refer to:

- Richard Cardinal Cushing (1895–1970), US prelate of the Roman Catholic Church
- Richard C. Cushing, Mayor of Omaha, 1890–1892
