= Lormong Lo =

American politician (1959–2011)

Lormong Lo 𖬄𖬶𖬞 𖬌𖬦 𖬄𖬶𖬞

Omaha City Council
- In office 1994–2001

Personal details
- Born: 1959 Vientiane, Laos
- Died: July 19, 2011 (aged 51–52) Lincoln, Arkansas, U.S
- Party: Republican
- Education: Creighton University; Ralston High School

Lormong Lo (RPA: Lauj Moob Lauj, Pahawh: 𖬄𖬶𖬞 𖬌𖬦 𖬄𖬶𖬞; 1959 – July 19, 2011) was the first Hmong American to be appointed to a city council in the U.S., in June 1994, where he managed the largest metropolitan city (Omaha—480,000 people) in the state of Nebraska. He replaced Joe Friend, who resigned.

in June 1997, Lo was elected to a second term of four years. That same June, Lo was the first Hmong ever to become president of a city council. He was also the first Hmong American to ever hold the title of Acting Mayor, starting in June 1997.

His second term was marked by boldness and controversy, when in 1998 he used his authority as Acting Mayor to negotiate a settlement with the firefighters' union over their labor contract and pending lawsuit, while Mayor Hal Daub was out of town. Daub rescinded the settlement but accepted the same terms later. He also proposed a ban on using fetal tissue for stem cell research, speculated to be a way to appeal to conservative voters. In 2001, he lost his re-election bid to Marc Kraft.

Lo was the first Hmong American to ever become elected President of the Asian Pacific American Municipal Officials (APAMO) by his APAMO colleagues, a constituency group of the National League of Cities, in Washington, D.C. He was selected to be Vice-Chair of both the Economic Development Committee and the Program Committee of NLC. In these positions, he helped write municipal policies, e.g., housing and economic development policies for the 15,000 cities in the United States and was responsible for its conference planning. He often lobbied the U.S. Congress and White House officials on policies of interest to the cities, especially credit, economic, housing and immigration policies.

In 1998, he was appointed by Governor of Nebraska Ben Nelson and served as a member of the Nebraska Public Employee Retirement System, where he oversees the state's $5 billion retirement assets. He is the first Hmong American official to be welcome in Beijing by the Vice-Premier of China. In 1988-89, Councilman Lo made official visits to China, Korea, Japan, Thailand, and Taiwan—where he met with foreign ministers, dealing with trade issues and promotions and the Prime Minister of Thailand, where thanked the Thai people, Thai government and Thai monarchy for providing humanitarian support to the Hmong and Indochinese refugees in Thailand for a decade, until they are resettled into third countries, particularly the U.S., Canada, France and Australia.

Lo is one of the first Hmong born in Laos to go back to hold face to face meetings with the cabinet ministers of the Lao communist government concerning the alleged communist use of chemical warfare against the Hmong people and its continuing attacks on the Hmong villages in Northern Laos, particularly at Muang Mok. Through such direct talks, Laos has gradually opened the door to visitors who were natives of Laos.

He attended gatherings at the White House during the Ronald Reagan and George H. W. Bush administrations, while he discussed municipal policies with White House officials as leader of APAMO during the Bill Clinton administration.

On July 18, 2011, Lo was feeling sick and checked into a hospital near his home in Arkansas. He later returned home and died in his sleep the following day. He was 52 years old. He is survived by his wife and five children.

In Laos, Lormong Lo was a student of Sam Thong College (College de SamThong in French). From September 1972 to 1975, he attended Sam Thong middle High School in Xiengkhouang Province. Then, he fled Laos with his family to a refugee camp in Thailand in 1975. Thus, he immigrated to the United States thereafter.

== See also ==
- Government of Omaha, Nebraska
