= Senator Clement =

Senator Clement may refer to:

- Bernadette Clement (born 1965), Senate of Canada
- Charles Clement (Wisconsin politician) (1815–1886), Wisconsin State Senate
- Percival W. Clement (1846–1927), Vermont State Senate

== See also ==
- Senator Clements (disambiguation)
