= Omaha Claim Club =

Private land claim resolution organization

The Omaha Claim Club, also called the Omaha Township Claim Association and the Omaha Land Company, was organized in 1854 for the purpose of "encouraging the building of a city" and protecting members' claims in the area platted for Omaha City in the Nebraska Territory. At its peak the club included "one or two hundred men", including several important pioneers in Omaha history. The Club included notable figures important to the early development of Omaha. It was disbanded after a ruling against their violent methods by the U.S. Supreme Court in 1860 in Baker v. Morton.

== Background ==
The first claim club in the United States was established by settlers around Burlington, Iowa, where claims were staked out soon after the American Revolutionary War. These clubs were established in direct violation of federal law, in what J. Sterling Morton described as "that independence characteristic of the commonwealth by which it became a state." Early Nebraska settlers were breaking the law as well, as they invaded Omaha tribal lands to which the United States had claim but no ownership. Morton noted that, "In both Nebraska and Iowa the squatters on lands were fully protected by the unauthorized if not positively illegal rules and promises of the claim clubs."

According to two prominent historians, the roots of the Omaha Claim Club lay in the city's founders' disagreements with "federal land laws that they considered unfair and unenforceable. Critics argued that the government's policy of selling land impeded rather than promoted progress ... Almost all thought that the land policy favored wealthy speculators."

A federal decree in 1834 that defined lands west of the Missouri "Indian Territory" prevented settlement by Americans for another 20 years. In 1846 Mormon settlers received permission from the Omaha tribe to establish their Winter Quarters near the Missouri River west of Kanesville, Iowa, and in 1848 Martin Van Buren's Free Soil Party advocated the federal government give away free land in the presidential election. By 1853, Kanesville townspeople had already driven stakes in the land that would become Omaha. Logan Fontenelle, along with six other leaders of the Omaha tribe, signed over rights to Omaha lands on March 16, 1854, and the Kansas–Nebraska Act was signed on May 30, 1854. On June 24 of that year the U.S. government announced the treaty with the Omaha tribe, and within 11 days, on July 4, Omaha City was formally founded.

== Claim club meetings ==
The Omaha Claim Club met regularly to confer upon rules and elect officers as necessary. In February 1857 a mass meeting was held at the "Claim House" on the Pioneer Block in Omaha. The Pioneer Block was located between Eleventh and Twelfth Streets on Farnam Street, on the present-day site of the Gene Leahy Mall in downtown Omaha.

With more than one hundred men present, delegations were also there from Bellevue, Florence, Elkhorn and Papillion. Each of these groups offered Omaha's Claim Club their "aid and counsel ... to assist people of Omaha in the protection of their rights."

=== First meeting ===
An injury to one is the concern of all.

When the Nebraska Territory was organized in 1854, there were no laws regulating land claims by settlers or claim jumpers. The Homestead Act remedying this was not enacted until 1862. In the meantime, a group of early settlers in the Omaha area formed a club determined to provide security for the land interests of its members. The organizing meeting of the Omaha Claim Club was held on July 22, 1854, at the site of the "lone tree", the only landmark within the Omaha City limits at the time. The lone tree was also the ferry landing leading to Kanesville, Iowa.

At the first meeting a constitution and bylaws were prepared and adopted, and officers were elected. Samuel Lewis was chosen chairman, M. C. Gaylord was secretary; Alfred D. Jones became judge, S. Lewis was clerk, and R. B. Whitted was sheriff. John M. Thayer, A. J. Hanscom, Andrew J. Poppleton, Lyman Richardson, Thomas B. Cuming, Dr. George L. Miller, Dr. Enos Lowe, Jesse Lowe, Joseph Barker, Sr., Joseph, Jr., and George E. Barker, 0. D. Richardson, Byron Reed, John Redick, and James Woolworth were members, as well. In 1855 the membership included nearly all the town's male residents. The motto, "An injury to one is the concern of all," was adopted.

The stated goals of the Omaha Claim Club were to protect new settlers from illegal claim jumpers who would attempt to take possession of land already claimed if possible, and to promote the development of Omaha City. However, more than one claim was made of the Claim Club's dubious purposes, including collusion and bullying. There was an early understanding that no member could own more than 80 acres (320,000 m^{2}) of timber. Other agreements settled the amount of land each member could own, requirements for claiming land in the area, requirements for maintaining land ownership, price fixing for land, as well as other price controls. There were also several punishments determined for settlers who violated any part of the club's rules, either stated or unstated.

== Influencing government ==
The First Nebraska Territorial Legislature was primarily composed of claim clubs members from across the territory. Despite federal law limiting land claims over 160 acres (0.65 km^{2}), state senators passed an act that legalized claims of 320 acres (1.3 km^{2}) and providing penalties for trespassing upon them.

In 1855 Colonel Lorin Miller, later mayor of Omaha, surveyed Scriptown in the spring and summer on behalf of the Omaha Claim Club. This land was used to persuade members of the Nebraska Territorial Legislature later that year as they voted on the location of the state capitol, which Omaha kept until 1867.

== Vigilante violence ==
The club was effective in protecting its members' claims, primarily and frequently using mob violence to enforce its rule. The club's vigilantes rode masked and at night, frustrating efforts to identify the mob. The Omaha Claim Club became recognized as the unofficial court governing land claims, and in 1854 Alfred D. Jones, a surveyor, divided land into blocks starting by the ferry landing. That was the first time anyone planned what Omaha would look like. Jones was soon afterwards appointed the first postmaster of Omaha. Later Club leadership included Andrew J. Poppleton.

The club's original claim of nearly four thousand acres (16 km^{2}) frustrated many settlers who came after the club was formed. Generally they objected to the vast extent of territory held by so few individuals and attempted to "jump", or occupy for themselves, the claims of the members of the Omaha Claim Club. After this happened, a vigilante committee formed by members of the club visited the claim jumper to inform him that he was trespassing upon land previously claimed. They would warn the intruder that if he didn't vacate immediately he would be forced to. If the committee encountered resistance, the jumper soon found himself neck-deep in trouble — the severity depending upon the intensity of resistance.

=== Shooting out the Frenchman ===
Cam Reeves was the first figure identified in a dispute for the Omaha Claim Club. An unnamed "Frenchman" had staked a claim in 1854 on part of Alfred D. Jones's land and refused to move off. The club sent for Reeves, who had gained a reputation as a trouble-shooter in Missouri, and he started a long battle with the Frenchman that drew crowds from neighboring towns. "The Frenchman took his beating and fled", while Cam Reeves stayed. He became Omaha's first sheriff.

=== Horse thieves ===
The Claim Club's "vigilante committee" activities were not limited to claim jumping. The vigilantes often cooperated with Sheriff Reeves, but often acted as lawmen, judges, juries and executioners themselves. Public whippings and lynchings were common.

Frontier punishment varied according to the degree of harm resulting from the crime. The pioneers dealt with most horse thieves mercilessly. In March, 1858, a posse of angered farmers captured two desperadoes who had stolen horses near Florence. After they were jailed in Omaha's courthouse, the Claim Club broke in and took the men, without any resistance from the sheriff. They hanged the horse thieves two miles (3 km) north of Florence that day, with no repercussions, except for Sheriff Reeves, who was fined for not fulfilling his duties.

=== Callahan versus Cuming ===
Another story involved acting Governor Thomas B. Cuming. Apparently, Cuming hired an Irish man named Callahan to make improvements on Cuming's land in order to conform with the homestead law. Callahan, however, filed a claim on the land for himself. When the claim club demanded that Callahan surrender the deed of ownership, a committee was appointed to "persuade" him. Callahan was then taken to the Missouri River, a hole was chopped in the ice, and he was dunked through the hole until he and the claim club came to an agreement. Callahan died within a year, apparently from the after-effects of hypothermia brought on from his dunking.

=== John Kelly ===
John Kelly was a carpenter with a legal claim to 160 acres (0.65 km^{2}) near Omaha. When word reached his aunt, Gertrude Wiley, that four wagons from the Claim Club were coming to "talk Kelly out" of his claim, she quickly hid him in her cellar in Saratoga. After a day of continual harassment from the vigilantes, Kelly walked 12 miles (19 km) south to Bellevue where he escaped to Iowa. After his deed to the land came, he went back to his land and was not bothered again.

=== Other cases ===
On February 2, 1856, the club was reorganized as the Omaha Township Claim Association but its arbitrary powers continued as before — in several instances even more viciously. Other victims of vigilante "justice" distributed by the Omaha Claim Club include Jacob S. Shull, Daniel Murphy, and George "Doc" Smith, who was later the Douglas County Surveyor for many years.

== Baker v. Morton ==
The Circuit court of the District of Nebraska decided against a claim brought by Alexander Baker against William Morton, both early Omaha settlers; Morton was involved in the Omaha Claim Club. Baker appealed to the United States Supreme Court, and in 1870 the Supreme Court ruled for Baker in the case of Baker v. Morton.

According to court proceedings, A. H. Baker was forced to sign over the land he claimed to another person for free because of threats made by members of the Omaha Claim Club. Important figures in Omaha's history testified during the trial, including John Redick and James Woolworth. The club was found to commonly take landowners who refused to sell their property to the nearby Missouri River by force. With a rope tied around the person's neck, members of the club repeatedly dunked him until he agreed to sell. In this case, the club threatened to hang or drown Baker. The Supreme Court held that since the property was obtained under duress, it was to be reinstated to the rightful owner, and overturned the circuit court's earlier finding on behalf of Morton.

== Demise ==
Reasons for the demise of the Omaha Township Claim Association, aka the Omaha Claim Club, vary. The Supreme Court's ruling effectively neutralized the club. Other sources say that with the arrival of Omaha's United States Land Office, the claims club simply was not needed. In 1856, the U.S. government surveyed the land in Douglas County, including Omaha, and on March 17, 1857 the U.S. Land Office opened.

The Omaha Claim Club, along with many claim clubs around Nebraska, disbanded by 1860.

== Legacy ==
The Omaha Claim Club and others like it are credited to bringing order to a lawless frontier. By enforcing the "laws" they made up, they supposedly created an order where the U.S. government was not prepared to otherwise. In 1857 when the Buchanan Administration announced the sale of lands in Nebraska would start in 1858, claims clubs across the state, led by Omaha, protested against him on the grounds that they would not be ready for the sale. The Administration was persuaded to wait until 1859.

The Saratoga Claim Club, established in 1857 north of Omaha City, was formed in admiration of Omaha's club. The East Omaha Land Company of 1882 and the South Omaha Land Company of 1887 are unrelated.

== See also ==
- History of Omaha
