= James Dworak =

American mayor (1925–2002)

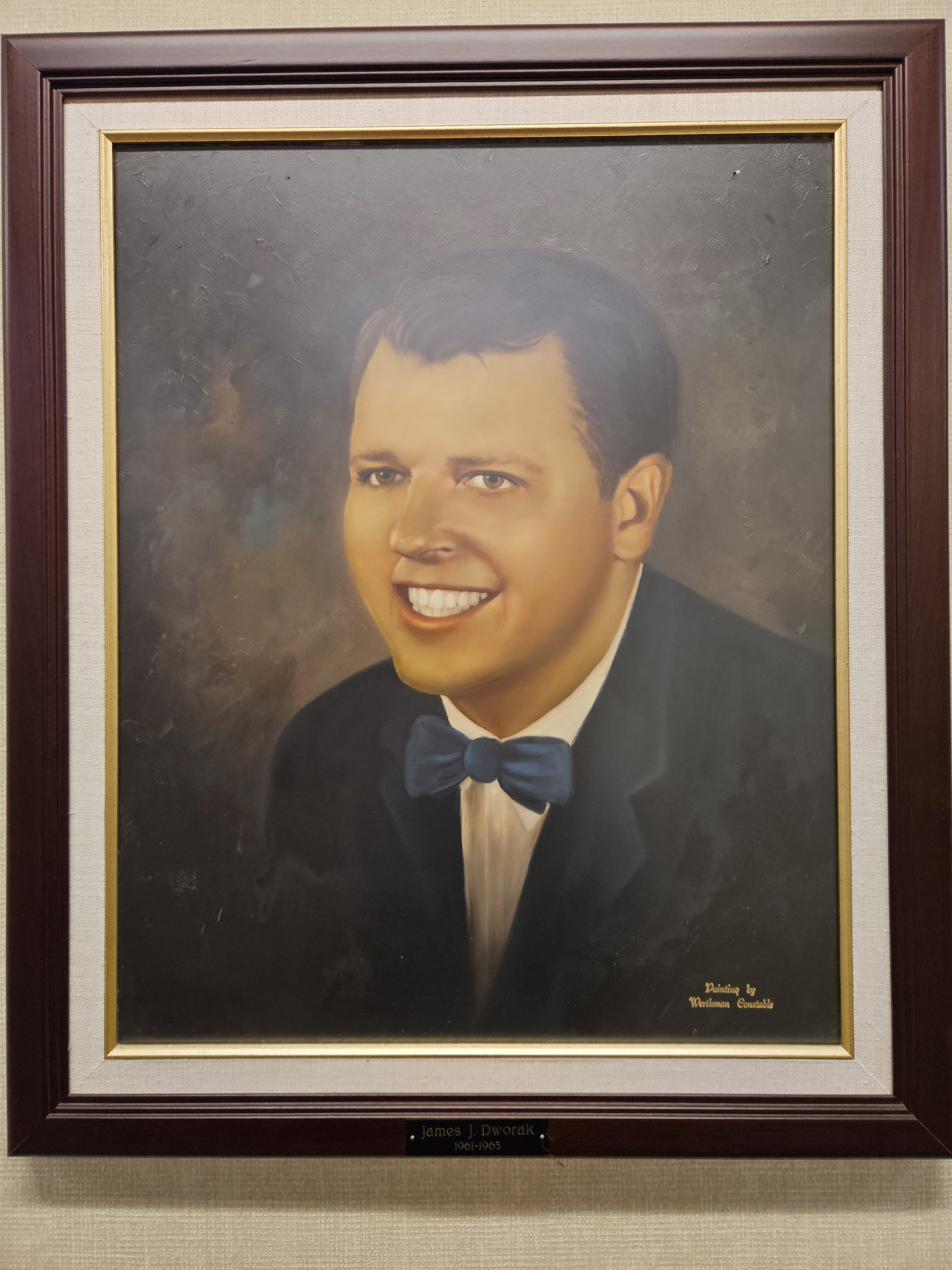

Mayor of Omaha
- In office 1961–1965
- Preceded by: Johnny Rosenblatt
- Succeeded by: Alexander V. Sorensen

James J. Dworak (September 4, 1925 - November 6, 2002) was mayor of Omaha, Nebraska, from 1961 to 1965.

== Private and business life ==
Mr. Dworak was born in Omaha and graduated from Omaha Technical High School in 1943. He joined the Army Air Corps for four years during World War II. After the war, he attended Creighton University for two years. He later earned a degree from the San Francisco College of Mortuary Science and joined his father and brother in the family mortuary business. He died at the Fresno, California, Veterans Administration Medical Center in 2002 at age 77 of complications from Parkinson's disease.

== Mayor ==
After sitting on the Omaha City Council for 4 years, he defeated Omaha attorney James F. Green by a 342-vote margin in the 1961 mayoral election, running as a Democrat. Mayor Dworak claimed among the successes of his administration construction of the Missouri River sewage treatment plant; new swimming pools, golf courses and housing for the aged; revamping the police communications system; and cooling racial unrest. In general, however, his tenure was considered rocky, culminating in an incitement for bribery during his re-election campaign in 1965.

== Bribery case ==
During Dworak's re-election campaign in 1965 he was taped asking for a $25,000 campaign contribution in exchange for not vetoing a rezoning application of Chicago developer John B. Coleman. Dworak lost his bid for re-election while under indictment. The following spring he was acquitted by the jury, his main defense being that he was stringing Coleman along. Judge John E Murphy presided over the cases of the other men indicted under similar accusations. Murphy initially dismissed the case against Planning Board member Carville R. "Barney" Buttner, while the others were tried together and found guilty. and appealed. The Nebraska Supreme Court overturned Murphy's dismissal of the case against Buttner, who then pleaded no contest to a charge of malfeasance in public office, a misdemeanor, and was sentenced to a fine of $200.

== See also ==
- List of mayors of Omaha, Nebraska

Preceded by Johnny Rosenblatt	Mayor of Omaha; 1961–1965	Succeeded by Alexander V. Sorensen
