= Prospect Hill, Omaha =

Neighborhood in Omaha, Nebraska, U.S.

Coordinates: 41°16′N 95°57′W

The Prospect Hill neighborhood in North Omaha, Nebraska is one of the oldest neighborhoods in the city. In addition to being home to some of the city's oldest structures, the neighborhood is also the site of the Prospect Hill Cemetery which is located between North 31st and 33rd Streets and Parker and Grant Streets. The neighborhood's boundaries are North 30th Street from Hamilton Street to Lake and up to Creighton Boulevard; then over to Blondo and up to North 38th Street to Hamilton. The Omaha Belt Line ran near the northwest corner of the neighborhood. The neighborhood is also home to the historic Franklin Elementary School.

== History ==
After being platted in the Scriptown affair of the 1850s, the neighborhood was immediately put to use by Byron Reed for a cemetery. Soon after it was called the Prospect Hill Cemetery. The first official burial was in 1858 for Omaha pioneer Alonzo F. Salisbury, with the grounds being used before that. In 1981 a study was conducted revealing that between 1983 and 1971 more than 800 African Americans were buried at Prospect Hill including at least 10 buffalo soldiers.

The U.S. government used land in the Prospect Hill neighborhood to construct almost 700 units of public housing in the 1940s. Built next to the cemetery on the southwest corner of North 30th and Lake Streets were the Hilltop Homes, across North 30th Street were Spencer Homes, and still located across 30th are Pleasantview Homes, all government housing projects.

Today, Omaha's Salem Baptist Church is in the location where Hilltop used to stand.

== See also ==
- History of Omaha
- Neighborhoods in Omaha, Nebraska
