= William James Connell =

American politician (1846–1924)

Member of the U.S. House of Representatives from Nebraska's 1st district
- In office March 4, 1889 – March 4, 1891
- Preceded by: John A. McShane
- Succeeded by: William Jennings Bryan

Personal details
- Born: William James Connell; July 6, 1846 Cowansville, Quebec, Canada
- Died: August 16, 1924 (aged 78) Atlantic City, New Jersey
- Resting place: Prospect Hill Cemetery, Omaha
- Party: Republican

William James Connell (July 6, 1846 – August 16, 1924) was an American Republican Party politician. From 1889 to 1891, he served one term in the U.S. House of Representatives.

== Early life and education ==
Born in Cowansville, Quebec, he immigrated with his family to Schroon Lake, New York in 1857 and then moved to Vermont in 1862. He moved to Omaha, Nebraska in 1867 and studied law. He was admitted to the bar in 1869.

== Career ==
He was the district attorney of the third judicial district of Nebraska from 1872 to 1876 and a city attorney for the city of Omaha from 1883 to 1887.

=== Congress ===
He was elected to the Fifty-first United States Congress, serving from March 4, 1889, to March 3, 1891. He was an unsuccessful candidate for reelection in 1890, losing to William Jennings Bryan, the future Democratic nominee for President in 1896, 1900, and 1908, and future Secretary of State.

He is known for introducing a bill that would provide a pension for formerly enslaved people (H.R. 11119) in the 51st Congress. This effort would later influence the National Ex-Slave Mutual Relief, Bounty and Pension Association (MRB&PA).

== Later career and death ==
He returned to his job as Omaha's city attorney in 1892. He died in Atlantic City, New Jersey on August 16, 1924, and is buried in Prospect Hill Cemetery, Omaha.

== Family ==
His son, Dr. Karl Albert Connell, invented the gas mask used by American troops during World War I.

U.S. House of Representatives
Preceded by John A. McShane (D)	Member of the U.S. House of Representatives from Nebraska's 1st congressional district March 4, 1889 – March 3, 1891	Succeeded by William Jennings Bryan (D)
