= Moses F. Shinn =

Moses Franklin Shinn (January 3, 1809 – 1885) was a pioneer Methodist Episcopal Church minister in Omaha, Nebraska. Aside from founding Omaha's first cemetery, called Prospect Hill, he was also renowned for renouncing his Methodist affiliation in Keokuk, Iowa in order to remain a member of the Freemasons. The incident was probably the only of its kind ever to occur in the history of the Masons. Late in his life, Shinn was reportedly "one of the wealthiest citizens of Omaha".

== Biography ==
Shinn was born in Hillsboro, Ohio in 1809. In 1842 he was a Methodist circuit rider around Birmingham, Iowa. His circuit included Birmingham, Colony, Philadelphia (Kilbourne), Keosauqua, Bentonsport, Bonaparte, Utica, Washington, Winchester, and several private homes throughout Van Buren and Washington counties. Historical records place Shinn in Council Bluffs, Iowa after 1851, when it was noted he was a "fiery Methodist preacher" who some claimed was "as learned in full deck poker as in theology". Around 1851 Shinn was a minister at a settlement in Iowa called Blue Point in Jefferson County. In 1852 he was sent to Council Bluffs. He was the presiding elder of the Council Bluffs District of the Methodist Church, which included work that developed in the new neighboring Nebraska Territory.

== Shinn's Addition ==
Moses Shinn was the first minister in Omaha, estimated to have moved there in 1854. He laid out "Shinn’s Addition" just northwest of the city early in Omaha's life. In that section Shinn plotted out 10 acres (40,000 m^{2}) for a cemetery, which he called Prospect Hill. This land was eventually sold to Byron Reed, who in turn sold it to the Forest Lawn Cemetery. In 1876 the North Mission Church, a Methodist Episcopal church, was built in that subdivision, as well.

== Shinn's Ferry ==
Shinn was an early settler in Butler County, joining a dozen other settlers listed by the federal government in 1859. He operated an early rope ferry twelve miles (19 km) east of Columbus, Nebraska for emigrants following the Platte River. Established in 1859 near the town of Savannah, Nebraska in Butler, then county seat, Shinn's Ferry provided an alternative to both the Loup Fork ferry and the often frustrating ford at Fort Kearney. Thousands of wagons crossed at Shinn's Ferry between 1859 and 1872. Shinn reportedly held daily services for travelers using the ferry.

After a bridge was built downriver at Schyler, Nebraska in 1872, the ferry closed. The town of Savannah lost the county capitol and folded several years later.

== Methodist career ==
In 1884 Moses Shinn was a Methodist minister in Keokuk, Iowa, and a member of the Fort Madison, Iowa Masonic Lodge. Shinn was a powerful leader in his church and his Lodge, and reportedly was greatly appreciated by many people. That year local Methodist leadership asked Shinn to increase his participation in the church by requiring him to renounce Masonry and devote all his energy to the church. At the next general conference of the church, a resolution to that end was adopted by Shinn's fellow ministers. In response, Shinn acknowledged the will of his peers and choose to leave the ministry. Seeing this as a powerful example by an admirable man, one of his fellow pastors stood up to ask Shinn to teach him about Masonry and have him inducted into Shinn's lodge. One after another, other ministers joined in the request, and soon Masonry was accepted throughout the Methodist Episcopal Church. That action is said to have influenced the spread of the Freemasons throughout the American West.

Shinn was also instrumental in the development of the Nebraska Territory's first college proposal for Simpson University. Meant to be developed on 100,000 acres (400 km^{2}) of land donated by the federal government, the university never came to fruition.

== Death ==
After accumulating almost $250,000 of land in his time, before his death Shinn became concerned about the wealth he accumulated. He wanted to go to heaven the way the Beatitudes of the Bible told him to, poor. So he gave his wealth away until he was down to assets of $10,000 at the time of his death in 1885. A portion of the money went to help some families, including relatives; however, the majority of it went to building new churches across Iowa and Nebraska. Shinn is reportedly buried in Prospect Hill Cemetery.

== See also ==
- History of Omaha
- Founding figures of Omaha, Nebraska
