= Johnny Rosenblatt =

American politician

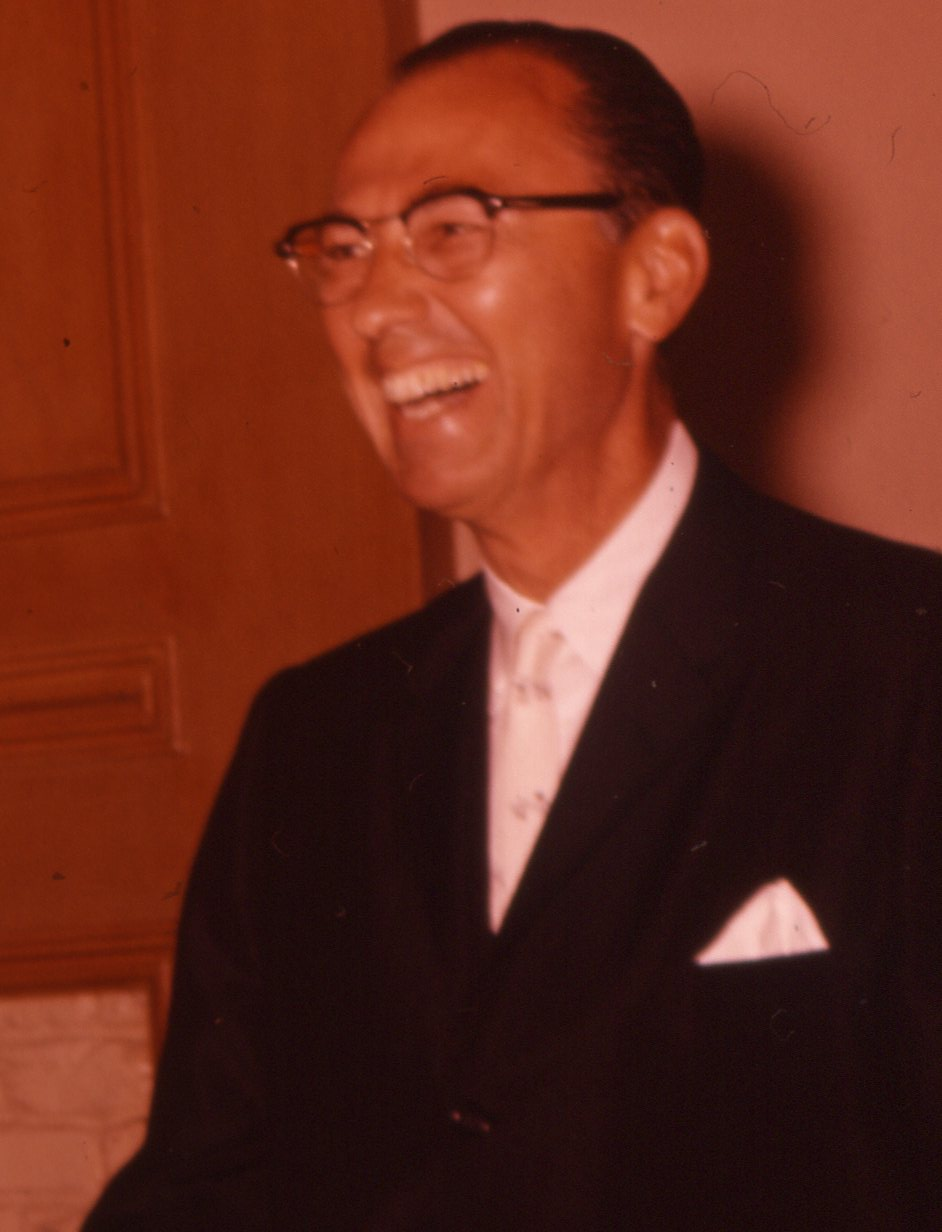

Mayor of Omaha, Nebraska
- In office 1954 – 1961
- Preceded by: Glenn Cunningham
- Succeeded by: James Dworak

Personal details
- Born: John Ross Rosenblatt; December 25, 1907
- Died: October 29, 1979 (aged 71) Omaha, Nebraska, U.S.
- Resting place: Beth El Cemetery; Ralston, Nebraska
- Spouse(s): Freeda Brodkey (1911–1973)

John Ross Rosenblatt (December 25, 1907– October 29, 1979) was an American civic leader, the mayor of Omaha, Nebraska, from 1954 to 1961. His name remains synonymous with baseball in Omaha, and Rosenblatt Stadium was named after him.

Rosenblatt died at age 71 on October 29, 1979, and was buried at Beth El Cemetery in Ralston.

== See also ==
- List of mayors of Omaha, Nebraska

| Preceded by Glenn Cunningham | Mayor of Omaha; 1954–1961 | Succeeded by James J. Dworak |
