= Archibald J. Weaver =

American politician

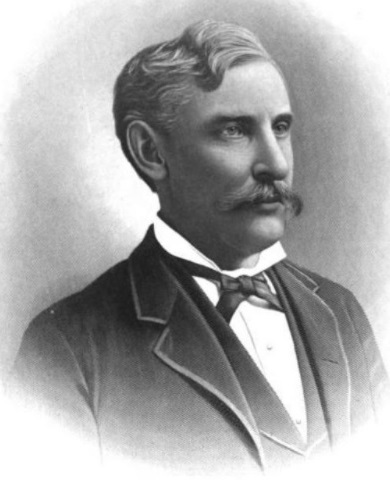
- From Volume 2 (1907) of Illustrated History of Nebraska

Member of the U.S. House of Representatives from Nebraska's 1st district
- In office March 4, 1883 – March 3, 1887
- Preceded by: District created
- Succeeded by: John A. McShane

Personal details
- Born: Archibald Jerard Weaver; April 15, 1843 Dundaff, Pennsylvania
- Died: April 18, 1887 (aged 44) Falls City, Nebraska
- Resting place: Steele Cemetery in Falls City
- Party: Republican

Archibald Jerard Weaver (April 15, 1843 – April 18, 1887) was an American lawyer, jurist, and Republican Party politician, serving three terms in the U.S. House of Representatives from 1883 to 1889.

He is best known for being the father of Governor of Nebraska Arthur J. Weaver and grandfather of Nebraska politicians Arthur J. Weaver Jr. and Phillip Hart Weaver.

== Early life and education ==
He was born in Dundaff, Pennsylvania, on April 15, 1843. He graduated from Wyoming Seminary, Kingston, Pennsylvania. He became a faculty member of the school from 1864 to 1867. In 1869, he graduated from Harvard Law School and was admitted to the bar in Boston, Massachusetts. He moved to Falls City, Nebraska, in 1869 to practice law.

== Career ==
He attended the State constitutional conventions in 1871 and 1875 and became the district attorney for the first district of Nebraska in 1872. In 1875 and 1879 he was elected judge of the first judicial district of Nebraska.

=== Congress ===
He resigned as judge in 1883 having been elected as a Republican to the Forty-eighth United States Congress. He was then reelected to the Forty-ninth United States Congress, but did not run for reelection in 1886.

He ran unsuccessfully in 1887 for the United States Senate, lost and resumed his practice of law.

== Death and burial ==
He died in Falls City on April 18, 1887, and is buried in Steele Cemetery in Falls City.

U.S. House of Representatives
Preceded by Edward K. Valentine (R)	Member of the U.S. House of Representatives from Nebraska's 1st congressional district March 4, 1883 – March 3, 1887	Succeeded by John A. McShane (D)
