= Joseph Millard =

Canadian-American businessman and politician

Joseph Hopkins Millard
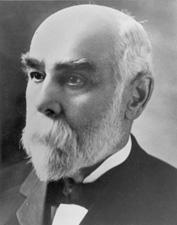

United States Senator from Nebraska
- In office March 28, 1901 – March 3, 1907
- Preceded by: John M. Thurston
- Succeeded by: Norris Brown

Mayor of Omaha
- In office 1872–1873
- Preceded by: Samuel Smith Caldwell
- Succeeded by: William M. Brewer

Personal details
- Born: April 20, 1836 Hamilton, Upper Canada
- Died: January 13, 1922 (aged 85) Omaha, Nebraska, U.S.
- Party: Republican

Joseph Hopkins Millard (April 20, 1836 – January 13, 1922) was a British North American-born American businessman and politician from Nebraska. He served in the United States Senate and as mayor of Omaha, and was an anti-suffrage activist.

== Life ==
Millard was born in Hamilton, Upper Canada. He moved to Iowa with his parents, who settled near Sabula, Iowa. He attended the district school and clerked in a store; Millard moved to Omaha, Nebraska, in 1856 and engaged in the land business. He moved to Montana in 1864; through the assistance of an Iowa capitalist, he opened a bank in Virginia City, Montana. Millard returned to Omaha in 1866 and became director, president, and cashier of the Omaha National Bank; he was one of the incorporators of the Omaha & Northwestern Railroad Company in 1869. He served as the mayor of Omaha in 1872; for fifteen years he was a director of the Union Pacific Railroad Company, six years of which he served in the capacity of a Government director.

Millard was elected as a Republican to the United States Senate, March 28, 1901, to fill the vacancy in the term beginning March 4, 1901, caused by the failure of the Nebraska Legislature to act, and served from March 28, 1901, to March 3, 1907. During his term he served as chairman of the Committee on Inter-Oceanic Canals (Fifty-ninth Congress); he was not a candidate for reelection in 1906. Millard then resumed the banking business in Omaha. He died there on January 13, 1922, and was interred in Prospect Hill Cemetery.

== Views ==
Millard headed an organization called Nebraska Men's Association Opposed to Woman Suffrage. His organization opposed allowing women to vote as a part of a broader desire to restrict voting to white men of high social class.

== Relatives ==
His brother, Ezra Millard, also served as mayor of Omaha. The former village and present-day neighborhood of Millard, Nebraska was named after the brothers.

== See also ==
- Brandeis-Millard House
- List of United States senators born outside the United States

Political offices
Preceded by Samuel Smith Caldwell	Mayor of Omaha; 1872–1873	Succeeded by William M. Brewer
U.S. Senate
Preceded by John Mellen Thurston	U.S. senator (Class 2) from Nebraska; 1901–1907; Served alongside: William V. Allen, Charles H. Dietrich, Elmer J. Burkett	Succeeded by Norris Brown
