= Richard Fellman =

American politician

Member of the Nebraska Legislature from the 4th district
- In office January 2, 1973 – January 5, 1975
- Preceded by: P. J. Morgan
- Succeeded by: Larry Stoney

Personal details
- Born: May 30, 1935 (age 91) Omaha, Nebraska
- Party: Democratic
- Spouse: Beverly Bloom (m. 1964)
- Children: 4 (Susan, Deborah, Jonathan, Daniel)
- Education: University of Nebraska (B.A., J.D.)
- Occupation: Attorney

Military service
- Allegiance: United States
- Branch/service: United States Army
- Years of service: 1959–1960

Richard M. "Dick" Fellman (born May 30, 1935) is an American Democratic politician from Nebraska who served as a member of the Nebraska Legislature from the 4th district from 1973 to 1975. He later served on the Douglas County Board of Commissioners and was the 1980 and 1982 Democratic nominee for Congress in the 2nd congressional district against Hal Daub.

== Early career ==
Fellman was born in Omaha, Nebraska, and graduated from the University of Nebraska, receiving his bachelor's degree in 1957 and his Juris Doctor in 1959. He worked as a reporter while a student, working for the Lincoln Star from 1956 to 1958, and the Associated Press in 1958. Fellman served in the United States Army from 1959 to 1960, and upon returning to Nebraska, worked as an attorney in private practice.

In 1966, Fellman announced that he would run for Congress against Republican Congressman Glenn Cunningham in the 2nd congressional district. He won the Democratic nomination unopposed, but was defeated by Cunningham in a landslide in the general election, losing 64–36 percent.

== Nebraska Legislature ==
In 1972, State Senator P. J. Morgan resigned from the Nebraska Legislature upon his election to the Douglas County Board of Commissioners. Governor J. James Exon appointed Fellman to serve out the remaining two years of his term in the 4th district, which was based in Omaha. Fellman was sworn in on January 2, 1973.

Fellman declined to run for a full term in 1974, and instead considered running for Attorney General. However, when former Governor Frank Morrison announced that he would run, Fellman declined to enter the race, observing that he would have a "most difficult and possibly impossible" challenge in defeating Morrison in the Democratic primary.

== Post-legislative career ==
Fellman announced that he would run for one of two at-large seats on the Douglas County Board of Commissioners, as part of an effort by local Democrats to oust incumbent County Commissioner Daniel Lynch, a Democrat. Both were ultimately nominated, with Lynch placing first in the primary by a wide margin. In the general election, Lynch and Fellman both won, with Lynch winning 29 percent of the vote and Fellman winning 28 percent, expanding Democrats' majority on the board from 3–2 to 4–1.

In 1980, Fellman opted against seeking a second term on the board to instead run for Congress in the 2nd district to succeed retiring Democratic Congressman John Cavanaugh. In the Democratic primary, he faced law student Jay McCarthy, retiree Bud Morrissy, and photographer Tom Plambeck. He won the primary by a wide margin, receiving 59 percent of the vote. In the general election, he faced fellow Douglas County Commissioner Hal Daub, the Republican nominee. Daub ultimately defeated Fellman, winning 53 percent of the vote to Daub's 44 percent.

Fellman announced that he would seek a rematch against Daub in 1982. He won the Democratic nomination unopposed, and advanced to the general election against Daub. Fellman lost by a wider margin in the rematch, losing to Daub, 43–57 percent.

In 1994, following the retirement of Chief Justice William Hastings of the Supreme Court of Nebraska, Fellman applied to fill the vacancy. However, the judicial nominating commission did not advance his name to Governor Ben Nelson and he was not ultimately selected.

When Omaha City Councilman Lee Terry was elected to Congress in 1998, Fellman applied to serve out the remainder of his term, but placed fifth in the Council's first round of voting, and another candidate was selected.
