= Senator Clemens (disambiguation) =

Jeremiah Clemens (1814–1865) was a U.S. Senator from Alabama from 1849 to 1853. Senator Clemens may also refer to:

- Dan Clemens (1945–2019), Missouri State Senate
- David Clemens (fl. 2010s–2020s), North Dakota State Senate
- Jeff Clemens (born 1970), Florida State Senate

== See also ==
- Senator Clements (disambiguation)
- A. C. Clemons (1921–1992), Louisiana State Senate
