= Everett P. Wheeler =

American lawyer, author, and politician (1840–1925)

Everett Pepperrell Wheeler
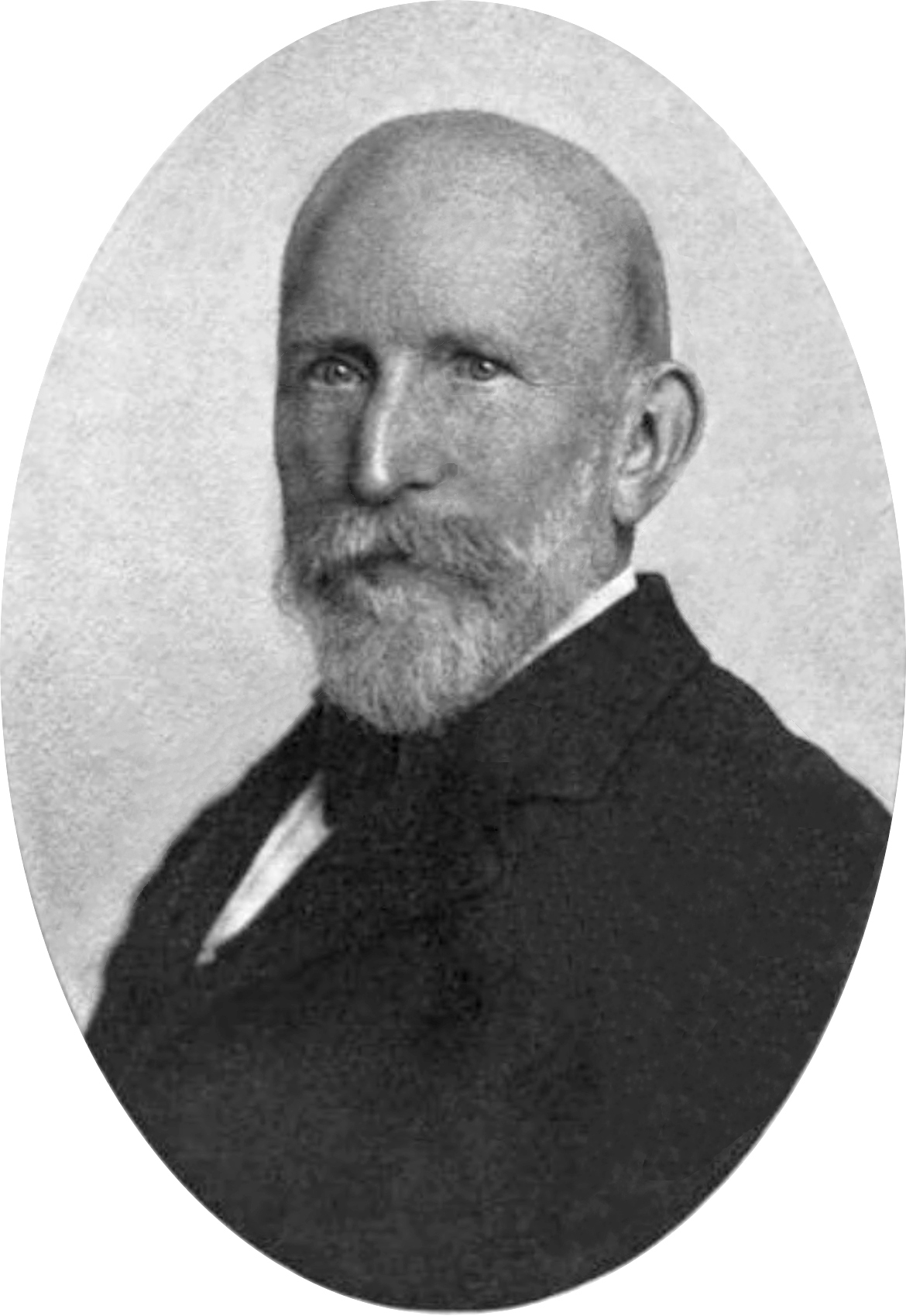
- Born: March 10, 1840; New York City
- Died: February 8, 1925 (aged 84); Manhattan
- Resting place: Green-Wood Cemetery

Everett Pepperrell Wheeler (March 10, 1840 – February 8, 1925) was an American lawyer, author, politician, and anti-suffrage activist.

He graduated from the College of the City of New York in 1856 and from Harvard in 1859, obtaining an LL.B. degree. In 1894, he was an unsuccessful candidate for governor of New York, nominated by a split faction of the Democratic Party who were barred from the state convention, and opposed the nomination of ex-governor David B. Hill. Later he helped found the Citizens Union. Wheeler drafted the bill which created in 1897 the consolidated City of New York, incorporating the boroughs of Brooklyn, Queens and Staten Island. He was one of the founders of the American Bar Association.

Wheeler headed anti-suffrage organizations in the 1910s, such as the Men's Association Opposed to Woman Suffrage He claimed his organizations produced a hundred thousand propaganda tracts against legal voting for women. He expressed particular opposition to black women voting.

His writings include:

- Wages and the Tariff (1888)
- Modern Law of Carriers (1890)
- Real Bimetallism (1895)
- The Harter Act (1899)
- The Knowledge of Faith (1904)
- Daniel Webster, Expounder of the Constitution (1905)
- The Case Against Woman Suffrage (1915)

== Sources ==
- The History of New York State at www.usgennet.org New York History gov election 1894
- The History of New York State at www.usgennet.org New York gov election result 1894
