= Andrew Jackson Poppleton =

American politician (1830–1896)

Andrew J. Poppleton
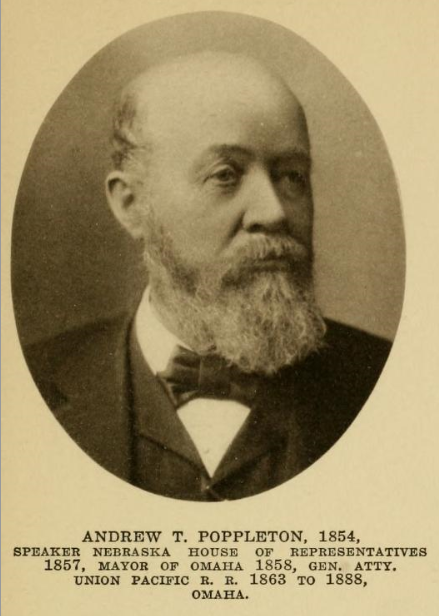

Representative, Nebraska Territorial Legislature
- In office July 4, 1854 – December 31, 1855
- Preceded by: None
- Succeeded by: None
- In office August 30, 1857 – February 20, 1858

Speaker pro tempore of the Nebraska Territorial House of Representatives
- In office January 8, 1858 – January 16, 1858
- Preceded by: James H. Decker; J. Sterling Morton (pro tempore)
- Succeeded by: Hiram P. Bennet

Mayor of Omaha
- In office March 2, 1858 – September 14, 1858
- Preceded by: Jesse Lowe
- Succeeded by: George Robert Armstrong

Personal details
- Born: 24 July 1830 Troy, Michigan
- Died: 9 September 1896 (aged 66) Omaha, Nebraska
- Occupation: Lawyer, politician

Andrew Jackson Poppleton (July 24, 1830 – September 9, 1896) was a lawyer and politician in pioneer Omaha, Nebraska. Serving in a variety of roles over his lifetime, his name is present throughout many of the important events of early Omaha history.

== Background ==
Born in Troy, Michigan, Poppleton was descended from an old English family, one of his ancestors was in Oliver Cromwell's army. His grandfather, Samuel Poppleton, emigrated to the U.S. in 1750. His son William settled in Michigan, where Andrew Jackson Poppleton was born in 1830. He went to Romeo Academy, and then to the University of Michigan. In 1851, Poppleton graduated from Union College. He was admitted to the Michigan bar in 1852. In 1854, Poppleton moved to Omaha, Nebraska Territory. Poppleton practiced law in Omaha and was involved with the Democratic Party.

== Career ==
Poppleton served in many political roles in pioneer Omaha. One of the founders of the Omaha Claim Club, Poppleton was also heavily involved in the enforcement of its rules over the city. When the club went to the U.S. Supreme Court, it was Poppleton who mounted the defense. They lost. Poppleton was a member of the Nebraska Territorial Legislature in 1854–55 and 1857–58. In a fluke in 1857, Poppleton served as the Speaker of the House of Representatives in the Nebraska Territorial Legislature. After that, he was the second mayor of young Omaha, serving for six months from March 2, 1858, until September 14, 1858, when he resigned from office. Poppleton was afterwards an influential real estate businessman and lawyer in Omaha.

Poppleton worked for many years as the general attorney for the Union Pacific Railroad. The most important case he ever argued was the 1879 trial of Standing Bear v. Crook, held at Fort Omaha. Poppleton, and noted Omaha lawyer John Lee Webster, argued in U.S. District Court that Native Americans such as Standing Bear, a Ponca chief, are "persons within the meaning of the law" and have the rights of citizenship.

== Personal life ==
Poppleton married Caroline L. Sears in 1855. They had three children: William S., Elizabeth, and Mary. He died September 24, 1896, and was interred at the Prospect Hill Cemetery in North Omaha. Poppleton Avenue in Omaha is named in his honor; the Poppleton Block in Downtown Omaha is listed on the National Register of Historic Places.

== See also ==
- History of Omaha

Preceded by Jesse Lowe	Mayor of Omaha; 1857–1858	Succeeded by George Robert Armstrong
