= William M. Brewer =

American mayor

Mayor of Omaha
- In office 1873–1874
- Preceded by: Joseph Millard
- Succeeded by: James S. Gibson

Personal details
- Died: September 12, 1921

William M. Brewer (died September 12, 1921) served as mayor of Omaha, Nebraska from 1873 to 1874. Before his election, Brewer ran a liquor manufacturing business. As mayor, Brewer focused on using the police to cut down the crime rate. Brewer resigned two months before the close of his term. He is buried in Prospect Hill Cemetery in Omaha.

Preceded by Joseph Millard	Mayor of Omaha; 1873-1874 (resigned)	Succeeded by James S. Gibson (acting)
