= Senator Clements (disambiguation) =

Earle Clements (1896–1985) was a U.S. Senator from Kentucky from 1950 to 1957. Senator Clements may also refer to:

- Charles H. Clements (born 1943), member of the West Virginia State Senate
- Judson C. Clements (1846–1917), member of the Georgia State Senate
- Robert Clements (Nebraska politician) (born 1950), member of the Nebraska State Senate

== See also ==
- Senator Clemens (disambiguation)
- Senator Clement (disambiguation)
