= Men's Association Opposed to Woman Suffrage =

20th century American organization opposed to women's suffrage

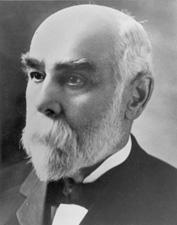
Suffrage opposition leader Joseph H .Millard

The Men's Association Opposed to Woman Suffrage was an American organization active in the 1910s that was opposed to legal voting by women and open exclusively to men. It was made up of loosely affiliated state and local chapters which typically existed for less than a year, the duration of a campaign against a state referendum proposing women's suffrage.

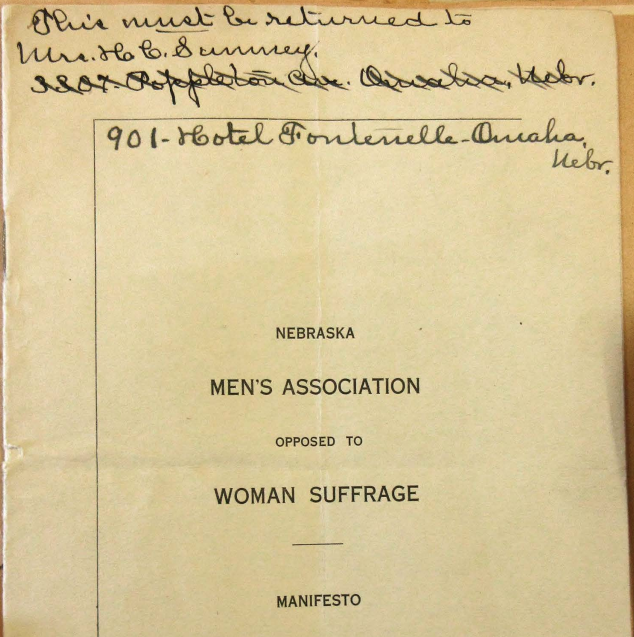
Anti-suffrage Manifesto with handwritten note by suffrage activist Katherine Sumney

The Association argued that voting should be restricted to white men of high social class. These arguments relied upon traditional gender roles presenting women as naturally unsuited to leadership.

State chapters were well financed and run by prominent men, including wealthy bankers and members of Congress. For example, the Massachusetts chapter was headed by Representative Charles L. Underhill, the New York chapter by lawyer Everett P. Wheeler, and the Nebraska chapter by Senator Joseph Millard, namesake of Millard, Nebraska. Chapters often functioned as men's auxiliaries to women's anti-suffrage organizations, though the relationship with women's organizations was marked by conflict.

The Nebraska chapter produced an anti-suffrage Manifesto, hoping to change the mind of US Secretary of State William Jennings Bryan, a Nebraskan man who supported suffrage. The Manifesto became "famous" according to Ida Husted Harper, and was collected and reproduced by suffrage supporters to highlight the weakness of their opponents' arguments.
