= Betty Abbott =

American politician

Betty Abbott was the first female city council member of Omaha, Nebraska.

Born Betty Lorraine Condon on February 16, 1923 in Council Bluffs, Iowa, she graduated from Abraham Lincoln High School, and was inducted into its hall of fame. She was married to Douglas Abbot until his death in 1978 and they had three daughters. She became a member of the Omaha city council in 1965 and stayed a member until 1977. In 1973 she was named the Omaha World-Herald's "Midlander of the Year." In 1975 she was elected to lead the League of Nebraska Municipalities. She went to City Hall on December 30, 1975, in a sweater that read, "Omaha City Council. Six and the Single Girl", a reference to the book Sex and the Single Girl and to the fact that she was the only female member on the seven-member city council. In 1977 she was the first major female contender to run for mayor of Omaha, but she lost.

She was also a founding member of the Henry Doorly Zoo's board of directors, and served on the board of directors of the National League of Cities, as president of the Nebraska Environmental Control Council, and on the Defense Department's commission on women (which she was appointed to by President Gerald Ford). She also worked in advertising. She sang and played the piano, and was one of the most popular members of the Omaha Press Club's annual gridiron show.

She died in 2005 at age 82, of pneumonia.
