= Walt Calinger =

Walter M. Calinger
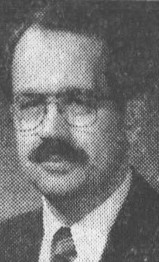

Mayor of Omaha
- In office 1988–1989
- Preceded by: Frank Conley (acting)
- Succeeded by: P. J. Morgan

Personal details
- Born: January 2, 1940 (age 86)
- Education: Ohio State University (1970); Creighton University (1977)
- Occupation: Lawyer, school superintendent

Walter M. Calinger (born January 2, 1940) is a former lawyer, former mayor of Omaha and education official.

== Political career ==
Walter Calinger was a member of the Omaha City Council and served as the 45th mayor of Omaha, Nebraska from April 20, 1988 to June 5, 1989. He was appointed by the city council after the death of Mayor Bernie Simon. Prior to serving on the City Council and as Mayor of Omaha Calinger was a member and elected twice as president of the Omaha Broad of Education.

== Education career ==
Calinger has a PhD in Education from Ohio State University (1970) and a J.D. from Creighton University (1977).

He has worked the large majority of his career in the education sector beginning as a math teacher and guidance counselor. He was employed by the Norton City School District in Summit County, Ohio, from 1998 to 2005, where he was superintendent from 2002 to 2005. While there, the district achieved an Excellent rating in 2003 from the Ohio Department of Education for the first time ever. It has retained that rating since.

Calinger worked for the Richmond Heights (Ohio) School District from 2005 to 2008. In his first year, the district improved five points on the Ohio Achievement Test. And the following year improved one more point. During that time, the RHEA entered into a teachers' strike that lasted for four weeks.

When Walter Calinger was hired by Woodland Hills School District outside Pittsburgh, his claims of past accomplishment was discussed by the Pittsburgh Tribune-Review reporter Brian Bowling. The article begins, "The new superintendent for Woodland Hills School District says he significantly raised test scores and closed the achievement gap between black and white students at a suburban Cleveland district."

In his position as superintendent (2008–2011) of the Woodland Hills School District, Calinger challenged the public charter school Propel, about how the School District's test results compared with the Propel charter school. His statement was disputed by the Pittsburgh Post-Gazette education reporter Eleanor Chute,:

Dr. Calinger provided a written report to the school board saying that Propel does not meet five reasons under legislative intent for charter schools and that the district's test scores "equal or surpass those at Propel." That statement is at odds with state math and reading test scores released by the state Department of Education.

Calinger strongly denied the accuracy of the Chute statement. "She did not at all deal with the requirement of the law setting up charter schools. It was that law and the charter schools failure to meet its requirements that Calinger was challenging." Calinger continued to make public statements about school data in an op-ed he published in the Post-Gazette in October, 2010.

Preceded by Fred Conley	(Interim) Mayor of Omaha; April 20, 1988 – June 5, 1989	Succeeded by P. J. Morgan
