= Charles Clement (Wisconsin politician) =

19th century American politician

Member of the Wisconsin Senate from the 7th district
- In office January 1, 1855 – January 5, 1857
- Preceded by: John W. Cary
- Succeeded by: Champion S. Chase

Personal details
- Born: November 14, 1815 Newburyport, Massachusetts, U.S.
- Died: January 11, 1886 (aged 70) McMinnville, Tennessee, U.S.
- Resting place: Mound Cemetery, Racine, Wisconsin
- Party: Republican; Free Soil (before 1854)
- Spouses: Judith Miranda Crosby (m. 1841; died 1864); Abbie Herrick Kimball (m. 1865–1886)
- Children: 7
- Occupation: Carpenter, newspaperman

Charles C. Clement (November 14, 1815 – January 11, 1886) was an American carpenter, newspaper publisher, Wisconsin pioneer, and abolitionist activist. He was a member of the Wisconsin Senate, representing Racine County during the 1855 and 1856 sessions. He was an early proprietor of the Racine Journal and played a significant role in the liberation of Joshua Glover. He was also one of dozens of lawmakers in the 1856 session caught up in the La Crosse and Milwaukee Railroad bribery scheme.

== Biography ==
Charles Clement was born in the town of Newbury, Massachusetts, in November 1815. He was raised and educated in Massachusetts and learned the carpentry trade apprenticing under his father. Working with his father, he went west to Alton, Illinois, where they worked as contractors building several houses and other buildings. During their time in Alton, the Clements witnessed the murder of Elijah Parish Lovejoy and the related riots. The violence had a lasting impression on both Clement and his father. They left Alton soon after, but spoke often about the barbarity of what they had witnessed, and the experience reinforced abolitionist beliefs in Clement and the rest of his family.

In 1840, he followed his brother, Stephen, to the village of Southport, in the Wisconsin Territory (now Kenosha, Wisconsin). He worked for a decade as a carpenter and construction contractor, and became involved in local affairs. In 1849, he was the first school superintendent for Kenosha County after its separation from Racine County.

In January 1850 he purchased the Southport Telegraph newspaper. He operated and edited the paper on and off for the next two years, collaborating with the previous editor C. Latham Sholes. He then sold the paper to Sholes and another partner in 1852.

Clement then moved to the neighboring city of Racine, Wisconsin, where he purchased control of the Racine Advocate newspaper; he only operated the paper for about a year, but that year included the Joshua Glover incident in March 1854.

Joshua Glover had been brought to Racine via the Underground Railroad, after escaping from slavery in the south. His presence in Racine became known, however, and his former captor, Bennami Garland, came north under the auspices of the Fugitive Slave Act to reclaim him. Garland seized Glover with the assistance of the U.S. marshal, and Glover was taken from Racine and imprisoned in Milwaukee while his case was being heard. Clement was one of the key actors in the plot to liberate Glover from Milwaukee. On the night of Glover's capture, he telegraphed his colleague Sherman Booth in Milwaukee to let him know that Glover was being taken there. Clement then used his newspaper, the Advocate to inspire righteous outrage among the people of Racine. On March 18, 1854, Clement went north and led a mob, along with Booth, to the Milwaukee jail, where they attempted to arrest Garland and the U.S. marshal. They ultimately broke Glover out of his cell and helped him to a boat, which took him to safety in Canada. Clement and others were arrested for assault and battery, but charges were eventually dropped by the district attorney.

Outrage over the Fugitive Slave Act was a substantial motivation for the creation of the Republican Party in the days after the Glover incident. That fall, Clement became the first Republican nominee for Wisconsin's 7th State Senate district, and was elected in November 1854 to a two-year term.

His reputation was damaged by his time in the State Senate, however. He was one of dozens of Wisconsin legislators in the 1856 session caught up in the railroad land grant bribery scheme, and was found to have received $10,000 of the corrupt railroad bonds (about $360,000 adjusted for inflation).

In the run-up to the American Civil War, Clement purchased the Racine Journal, and operated it as a Republican partisan paper through most of the Civil War.

He suffered from arthritis, and in 1868 he moved to McMinnville, Tennessee, believing the climate would be beneficial to his condition. He lived most of the rest of his life there, dying in January 1886.

== Personal life and legacy ==
Charles Clement was one of eleven children born to Joseph Warren and Mary (née Fitz) Clement. Both parents were born and lived out their lives in Essex County, Massachusetts. The Clements traced their ancestry to Moses Clement, who arrived at the Plymouth Colony in 1628. On his mother's side, the Fitz family traced their ancestry to Robert Fitz, who settled in the Colony of Virginia in 1614.

Charles Clement's younger brother, Stephen, who he had followed to Wisconsin, had subsequently moved to Texas in the years before the Civil War. In that time, secret societies such as the Knights of the Golden Circle began hunting for anti-slavery northerners living in the southern states. Stephen Clement was an active subscriber to Charles Clement's abolitionist Republican newspapers, his mail was intercepted and read, and soon a band of armed men showed up at his property. He was forced to flee the state in the weeks just before the Battle of Fort Sumter.

Charles Clement married twice. His first wife was Judith Miranda Crosby. They married in 1841 and had seven children together before her death in 1864. A year after his first wife's death, Clement married Abbie Herrick Kimball, who survived him.

The Joshua Glover saga is memorialized in Racine with a number of plaques at the locations of the various events; one of the plaques is located at the site of Clement's Advocate newspaper office on Racine's Main Street, and describes his initial role in the events:

As word of Joshua Glover's Friday night capture spread through Racine, Charles Clement, editor of the Racine Advocate, telegraphed fellow abolitionist editor Sherman Booth in Milwaukee to let him know Glover and his captors were headed there. Clement also included a brief notice about Glover in Saturday morning's Advocate. More complete accounts of the arrest and subsequent events appeared in the following edition, with the main headline announcing:
'HIGH-HANDER OUTRAGE! Attempt to kidnap a citizen of Racine by slave gatherers!'"

Wisconsin Senate
Preceded by John W. Cary	Member of the Wisconsin Senate from the 7th district January 1, 1855 – January 5, 1857	Succeeded by Champion S. Chase
