= Chicago River and Harbor Convention of 1847 =

1847 political convention in Chicago, Illinois

The Chicago River and Harbor Convention of 1847, also known as the Harbor and River Convention of 1847, was a political convention held in Chicago, Illinois, from July 5 to July 7, 1847, to express support for federal funding of internal improvements. Noted for its size and pageantry, the event drew almost 2,500 delegates from nineteen states. Although not expressly partisan in nature, it proved to be important for the elaboration of Whig beliefs.

== Background ==
On August 3, 1846, President James K. Polk vetoed a Congressional appropriation bill for river and harbor improvements, most of which were slated for the Great Lakes region. Polk argued that since the proposed improvements did not pertain to national defense or foreign commerce, their responsibility lay with individual states, not the federal government.

His decision enraged many politicians and commercial groups throughout north and west, who believed that it was a federal responsibility to help maintain the safety and viability of waterways. Many like-minded delegates, representing mostly northern states, saw the need for a political counterattack, and the convention was scheduled for the following summer. Although Chicago was still small and fairly remote, many contemporaries saw it as a promising city, especially since the Illinois and Michigan Canal was expected to open soon.

== The Convention ==
The River and Harbor Convention was an enormous occasion, especially for Chicago. The first day of the convention began with a 12-block parade including floats, bands, military units, and fire companies. It led to a large tent pavilion, located in front of City Hall, which could seat between 4,000 and 5,000 people. One contemporary report from the convention claimed that the attendance was upwards of 10,000 or even 20,000, but delegate registration lists pin the actual number closer to 2,500. Nevertheless, the size was unprecedented for political conventions of that era. One attendee called it "undoubtedly the largest deliberative body that ever assembled." The three-day event was reported in Washington, D.C., New York, and even London.

The attendance list included many notable names, such as Horace Greeley, Millard Fillmore, Thomas Corwin, and Edward Bates, who was named the convention's president. The states officially represented were Connecticut, Florida, Georgia, Illinois, Indiana, Iowa, Kentucky, Maine, Massachusetts, Michigan, Missouri, New Hampshire, New Jersey, New York, Ohio, Pennsylvania, Rhode Island, South Carolina, and Wisconsin.

Numerous delegates spoke in vocal support of federal funding for internal improvements. Abraham Lincoln, a recently elected Whig Congressman from Illinois, gave a brief speech, which represented his first appearance in front of a national audience. Many absent politicians, including Henry Clay, Martin Van Buren, and Thomas Hart Benton, sent letters that were read aloud on stage. The note written by Lewis Cass was so brief and non-committal that it was mocked and re-read.

== Impact ==
One of the convention's main accomplishments was drafting a fifteen-point "Declaration of Sentiments." The document provided firm reasoning for federal funding of internal improvements, and it systematically refuted the reasoning President Polk had given in his veto from the previous year.

An executive committee published the convention's proceedings and presented them to Congress the following year. No significant legislative changes occurred immediately, but the sentiments expressed at the convention reverberated throughout the political sphere, especially among Whigs. In addition to clarifying many Whig economic beliefs, the three-day event also established greater bonds between politicians who had never gathered together before.

In 1852, Congress appropriated over $2.2 million for rivers and harbors during the presidency of Millard Fillmore, who had attended the convention.

Because details of the event were published so widely, the River and Harbor Convention also represented a welcome form of advertising for the city of Chicago.
