= Omaha City Council =

City council; legislative body of the City of Omaha, Nebraska, U.S.

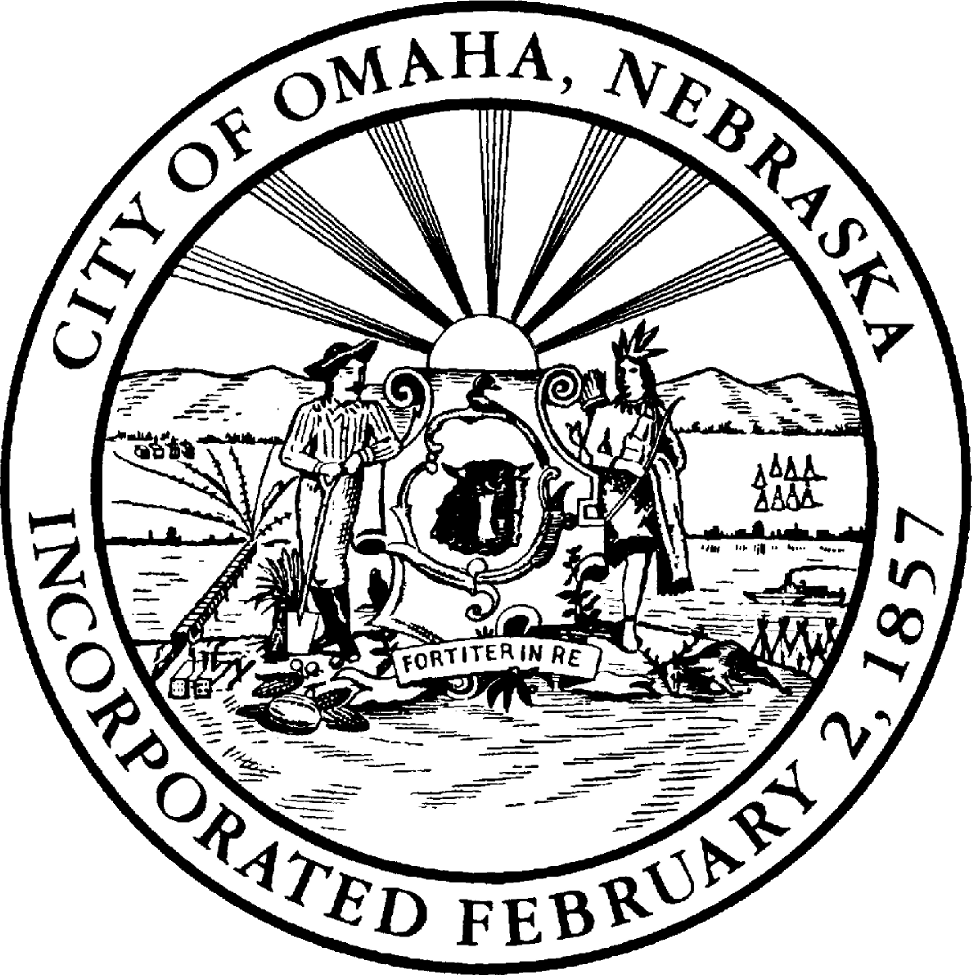

Type
- Type: Unicameral deliberative assembly of Omaha

Leadership
- Mayor: John Ewing, (D) since June 9, 2025
- President: Pete Festersen, (D) since June 2021
- Vice President: Aimee Melton, (R) since May 2023

Structure
- Seats: 7 officially non-partisan
- Political groups: Democratic (Note: City of Omaha elections are officially non-partisan; party affiliations are informational only.) 4 / 7 (57%); Republican 3 / 7 (43%)
- Length of term: 4 years

Elections
- Voting system: First-past-the-post; Non-partisan Voting (primaries and special elections beginning 1957)
- Last election: May 13, 2025
- Next election: May 2029

Meeting place
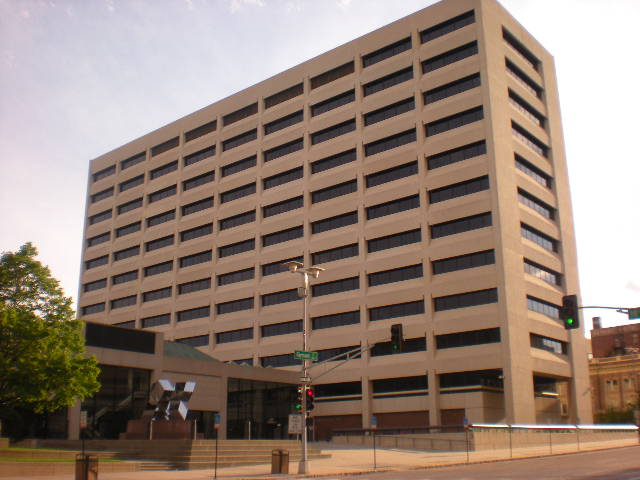
- Omaha City Hall, Douglas

Website
- city.council.city.of.omaha.org

The City Council of Omaha, Nebraska, is elected every four years on a nonpartisan basis. The next election will occur in 2029. Omaha has a strong mayor form of government. Members are elected by district. Currently seven city council districts are represented across the City of Omaha.

== Membership ==
City council members represented seven districts throughout the city of Omaha.

The city council is officially nonpartisan; party affiliations are for informational purposes only. However, registered Democrats hold a majority.

| District | Councilman | Party |
|---|---|---|
| 1 | Pete Festersen | D |
| 2 | LaVonya Goodwin | D |
| 3 | Danny Begley | D |
| 4 | Ron Hug | D |
| 5 | Don Rowe | R |
| 6 | Brinker Harding | R |
| 7 | Aimee Melton | R |

== Additional seats ==
In 2006 the Nebraska State Legislature began deliberations on adding additional seats to the Omaha City Council. Due to the annexation of Elkhorn by Omaha, the city council has proposed new boundaries for the districts that would split Elkhorn between two districts. Legislative Bill 405, introduced by Elkhorn State Senator Dwite Pedersen, would increase the size of the Omaha City Council to 9 members and realign districts. However, this bill was tabled in March 2007 until the next legislative session.

=== First Omaha City Council ===
The first Omaha City Council was convened in 1857. It was composed of A. D. Jones, who resigned March 23, 1857; T. G. Goodwill, who died May 18, 1857; G. C. Bove, H. H. Visscher, Thomas Davis, William N. Byers, William W. Wyman, Thomas O'Connor, C. H. Downs, J. H. Kellom, for whom Kellom School was later named; and John Creighton, whom Creighton University was later named for.

The city council has long taken stances on issues. In 1859 a local newspaper reported that a, "...bill introduced in the Omaha City Council, for the abolition of slavery in this Territory, was called up yesterday, and its further consideration postponed for two weeks. A strong effort will be made among the Republicans to secure its passage; we think, however, it will fail. The farce certainly cannot be enacted if the Democrats do their duty."

Table of Recent Members
| Election Year | Position 1 | Position 2 | Position 3 | Position 4 | Position 5 | Position 6 | Position 7 |
|---|---|---|---|---|---|---|---|
| 1957 | W. P. Garvey | Albert L. Veys | A. V. Sorensen | Warren R. Swigart | James J. Dworak | Harry Trustin | Sam W. Reynolds (Note: March 10, 1958: Resigned from city council after moving out of city limits.) |
| 1957 | W. P. Garvey | N.P. Dodge (Note: February 8, 1958: Selected by City Council to fill vacancy.) | A. V. Sorensen | Warren R. Swigart | James J. Dworak | Harry Trustin | |
| 1961 | Albert L. Veys | Warren R. Swigart | Harry Trustin | H. F. Jacobberger | Ernest A. Adams | William R. Milner | Arthur D. Bradley Jr. |
| 1965 | Robert G. Cunningham | Betty Abbott (Note: First woman elected to the Omaha City Council.) | H. F. Jacobberger | Albert L. Veys | Arthur D. Bradley Jr. | Sam Vacanti | Lynn R. Carey |
| 1969 | H. F. Jacobberger | Warren R. Swigart | Albert L. Veys | Arthur D. Bradley Jr. | L. K. Smith | Betty Abbott | John Ritums |
| 1973 | John Hlavacek | John Miller | Robert G. Cunningham (Note: November 16, 1976: Appointed by City Council to become interim mayor.) | Monte Taylor | Steve Rosenblatt | Jerry Hassett | Betty Abbott |
| 1973 | John Hlavacek | John Miller | Ray F. Slizewski (Note: December 14, 1976: Selected by City Council to fill vacancy.) | Monte Taylor | Steve Rosenblatt | Jerry Hassett | Betty Abbott |
| 1977 | Steve Rosenblatt | Jerry Hassett | Richard Takechi (Note: First Japanese American elected to the Omaha City Council.) | Mary Kay Green | Tim Rouse | Leo Kraft | Warren R. Swigart |
| | District 1 | District 2 | District 3 | District 4 | District 5 | District 6 | District 7 |
| 1981 | David Stahmer | Fred Conley (Note: First African American elected to the Omaha City Council.) | Walt Calinger | Steve Tomasek | Connie Findlay (Note: First time two women elected to the Omaha City Council simultaneously.) | Sylvia Wagner (Note: First time two women elected to the Omaha City Council simultaneously.) | Bernie Simon |
| 1983 | | Fred Conley | | Steve Tomasek (Note: January 23, 1987: Became acting mayor after recall of Mayor Mike Boyle.) | | Sylvia Wagner | |
| 1985 | Joe Friend | | Walt Calinger (Note: April 20, 1988: Appointed by City Council to become interim mayor.) | | Richard Takechi | | Bernie Simon (Note: February 6, 1987: Appointed by City Council to become interim mayor.) |
| 1985 | Joe Friend | | Subby Anzaldo (Note: May 27, 1988: Selected by City Council to fill vacant District 3 seat.) | | Richard Takechi | | Allen Dinzole (Note: March 24, 1987: Selected by City Council to fill vacant District 7 seat.) |
| 1987 | | Fred Conley (Note: March 25, 1988: Became acting mayor because Bernie Simon was ill with cancer.) | | Steve Tomasek | | Jim Cleary | |
| 1989 | Joe Friend | | Subby Anzaldo | | Richard Takechi | | Steve Exon |
| 1991 | | Fred Conley | | Steve Tomasek | | Lee Terry | |
| 1993 | Joe Friend (Note: June 1, 1994: Resigned from office.) | Brenda Council (Note: First African American woman elected to the Omaha City Council.) | Subby Anzaldo | Paul Koneck | Richard Takechi (Note: December 10, 1996: Resigned from City Council after being elected to Douglas County register of deeds.) | Lee Terry | Frank Christensen |
| 1993 | Lormong Lo (Note: May 17, 1994: First Hmong American to be appointed to a City Council in the United States.) | Brenda Council | Subby Anzaldo | Paul Koneck | Cliff Herd (Note: January 7, 1997: Selected by City Council to fill vacant District 5 seat.) | Lee Terry | Frank Christensen |
| 1997 | Lormong Lo | Frank Brown | Subby Anzaldo (Note: February 19, 2000: Resigned from city council to work for Mayor Hal Daub.) | Paul Koneck | Cliff Herd | Lee Terry (Note: January 4, 1999: Resigned from city council after being elected to U.S. Congress.) | Marc Kraft |
| 1997 | Lormong Lo | Frank Brown | Bob Sivick (Note: February 15, 2000: Selected by City Council to fill vacant District 3 seat.) | Paul Koneck | Cliff Herd | James Monahan (Note: December 22, 1998: Selected by City Council to fill vacant District 6 seat.) | Marc Kraft |
| 2001 | Marc Kraft | Frank Brown | Jim Vokal | Garry Gernandt | Dan Welch | Franklin Thompson | Chuck Sigerson |
| 2005 | Jim Suttle | Frank Brown | Jim Vokal | Garry Gernandt | Dan Welch | Franklin Thompson | Chuck Sigerson |
| 2009 | Pete Festersen | Ben Gray | Chris Jerram | Garry Gernandt | Jean Stothert | Franklin Thompson | Chuck Sigerson (Note: March 1, 2010: Resigned after stroke and heart attack.) |
| 2009 | Pete Festersen | Ben Gray | Chris Jerram | Garry Gernandt | Jean Stothert | Franklin Thompson | Thomas Mulligan (Note: April 13, 2010: Selected by City Council to fill vacant District 7 seat.) |
| 2013 | Pete Festersen | Ben Gray | Chris Jerram | Garry Gernandt | Rich Pahls | Franklin Thompson | Aimee Melton |
| 2017 | Pete Festersen | Ben Gray | Chris Jerram | Vinny Palermo | Rich Pahls (Note: January 5, 2021: Resigned from city council after being elected to Nebraska Legislature.) | Brinker Harding | Aimee Melton |
| 2017 | Pete Festersen | Ben Gray | Chris Jerram | Vinny Palermo | Colleen Brennan (Note: December 22, 2020: Selected by City Council to fill vacant District 5 seat.) | Brinker Harding | Aimee Melton |
| 2021 | Pete Festersen | Juanita Johnson | Danny Begley | Vinny Palermo (Note: August 1, 2023: Omaha City Council votes to kick jailed Vinny Palermo off the council, 6-0.) | Don Rowe | Brinker Harding | Aimee Melton |
| 2021 | Pete Festersen | Juanita Johnson | Danny Begley | Ron Hug (Note: September 12, 2023: Omaha City Council votes to appoint Ron Hug after kick jailed Vinny Palermo off the council, 6-0.) | Don Rowe | Brinker Harding | Aimee Melton |
| 2025 | Pete Festersen | LaVonya Goodwin | Danny Begley | Ron Hug | Don Rowe | Brinker Harding | Aimee Melton |

== See also ==
- Landmarks Heritage Preservation Commission
- Government of Omaha
