= George Robert Armstrong =

American politician

Mayor of Omaha
- In office March 5, 1861 – November 5, 1862
- Preceded by: Clinton Briggs
- Succeeded by: Benjamin Eli Barnet Kennedy

Interim Mayor of Omaha
- In office September 14, 1858 – March 10, 1859
- Preceded by: Andrew Jackson Poppleton
- Succeeded by: David Douglas Belden

Personal details
- Born: August 1, 1819
- Died: April 20, 1896 (aged 76) Omaha, Nebraska
- Occupation: Politician

George Robert Armstrong (August 1, 1819 – April 20, 1896) was a pioneer mayor of Omaha, Nebraska. He served as the interim Mayor of Omaha from 1858 to 1859 after Andrew Jackson Poppleton's resignation. He was later elected in 1861, only to resign in 1862.

After Armstrong's time as mayor, he served as a judge, and was later the first person to be elected as Douglas County Clerk of the District Court.

== See also ==
- History of Omaha
- List of mayors of Omaha, Nebraska

Preceded by Andrew Jackson Poppleton	Mayor of Omaha; 1858–1859	Succeeded by David Douglas Belden

Preceded by Clinton Briggs	Mayor of Omaha; 1861–1862	Succeeded by Benjamin Eli Barnet Kennedy
