= Lower seaboard theater of the American Civil War =

Military operations near the coastal areas of the Southeastern United States

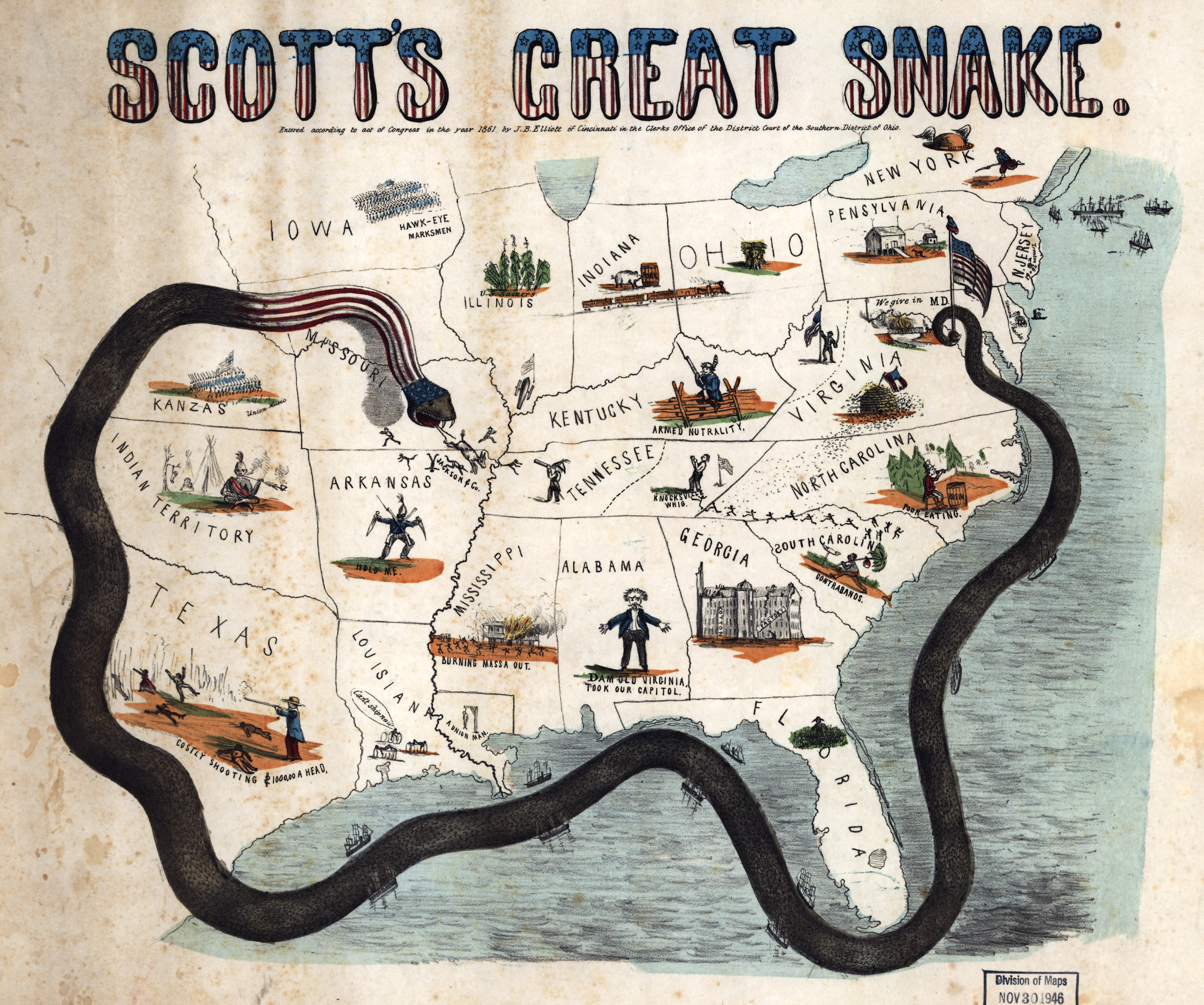
An 1861 cartoon map of Winfield Scott's plan

The lower seaboard theater of the American Civil War encompassed major military and naval operations that occurred near the coastal areas of the Southeastern United States: in Alabama, Florida, Louisiana, Mississippi, South Carolina, Texas, and points south of it.

Union Naval activities in this theater were dictated by the Anaconda Plan, with its emphasis on strangling the South with an ever-tightening blockade, and later in executing attacks on and occupying the port cities of New Orleans, Mobile, and Galveston. The Confederate response was mainly limited to blockade running and the Confederate Navy reacting defensively to Union incursions, with mixed success.

Inland operations are included in the western theater or trans-Mississippi theater, depending on whether they were east or west of the Mississippi River. Coastal operations in Georgia, including the culmination of Sherman's March to the Sea, are included in the western theater.

The campaign classification established by the U.S. National Park Service, which calls these the lower seaboard theater and gulf approach operations, is more fine-grained than the one used in this article. Some minor NPS campaigns have been omitted and some have been combined into larger categories. Only a few of the 31 battles the NPS classifies for this theater are described. The Port Royal Expedition of 1861 has been added, although it has not been classified by the NPS. Boxed text in the right margin show the NPS campaigns associated with each section.

== Alabama ==
Admiral David Farragut won the decisive naval Battle of Mobile Bay on August 5, 1864. Steaming past the forts guarding the mouth of the bay, Farragut engaged and forced the surrender of the Confederate fleet defending the city, capturing Admiral Franklin Buchanan. The city itself, long a desired target of Grant's, would remain in Confederate hands until 1865, but the last seaport east of the Mississippi on the Gulf Coast was closed, further tightening the Union blockade. The capture of Atlanta and Mobile Bay together boosted Northern morale and made an enormous contribution to the re-election of Abraham Lincoln.

== South Carolina ==
Much of the war along the South Carolina coast concentrated on capturing Charleston, due both to its role as a port for blockade runners and to its symbolic role as the starting place of the war. One of the earliest battles of the war was fought at Port Royal Sound, south of Charleston. The Union navy selected this location as a coaling station for the South Atlantic Blockading Squadron.

In attempting to capture Charleston, the Union military tried two approaches, by land over James or Morris Islands or through the harbor. However, the Confederates were able to drive back each Union attack. One of the most famous of the land attacks was the Second Battle of Fort Wagner, in which the 54th Massachusetts Infantry took part. The Federals suffered a serious defeat in this battle, losing 1,500 men while the Confederates lost only 175. During the night of February 17, 1864, the CSS Hunley made the first successful sinking of an enemy warship by a submarine, although the Hunley was also sunk shortly afterwards. The Confederates used other crafts such as the David but these were not as successful.

== Georgia ==
Fort Pulaski on the Georgia coast was an early target for the Union navy. Following the capture of Port Royal, an expedition was organized with engineer troops under the command of Captain Quincy A. Gillmore. After a month of positioning 36 mortars and rifled cannons on nearby Tybee Island, Gillmore opened a bombardment of the fort on April 10, 1862. The Confederates surrendered the following afternoon after their magazine was threatened by Union shells. The Union army occupied the fort for the rest of the war after making repairs.

== Florida ==
Following the secession of Florida in January 1861, Florida troops seized most Federal property in the state with the exceptions of Fort Zachary Taylor at Key West and Fort Pickens at Pensacola. The Union navy established a blockade of the coast early in the war, with the state's Atlantic coast covered by the South Atlantic Blockading Squadron and the Gulf coast by the East Gulf Blockading squadron.

Several small skirmishes were fought in the state, but no major battles. In 1864, in an attempt to organize a pro-Union government in Florida, a Union force under Brigadier General Truman Seymour moved inland from Jacksonville but was defeated at the Battle of Olustee on February 20, which was the largest Civil War battle in Florida. The Union army attempted to capture the state capital of Tallahassee but were defeated at the Battle of Natural Bridge on March 8, 1865. Florida was one of only two Confederate states not to have its capital captured in the war.

== Louisiana ==
One of the early Union objectives in the war was the capture of the Mississippi River, in order to cut the Confederacy in half. "The key to the river was New Orleans, the South's largest port [and] greatest industrial center." In April 1862, a Union naval task force commanded by Commander David D. Porter attacked Forts Jackson and St. Philip, which guarded the river approach to the city from the south. While part of the fleet bombarded the forts, other vessels forced a break in the obstructions in the river and enabled the rest of the fleet to steam upriver to the city. A Union army force commanded by Major General Benjamin Butler landed near the forts and forced their surrender.

The following year, the Union Army of the Gulf commanded by Major General Nathaniel P. Banks laid siege to Port Hudson for nearly eight weeks, the longest siege in US military history. To cut Port Hudson's supply lines through the Red River, Banks first advanced up Bayou Teche, capturing the Atchafalaya and the Red rivers up to Alexandria. (See Bayou Teche Campaign.) The Confederates defending the city surrendered on July 9, after hearing of the surrender at Vicksburg. These two surrenders gave the Union control over the entire Mississippi River and split the Confederacy in half.

For the rest of the war the Confederates concentrated on trying to recapture the areas they lost. From June to September 1863 Major General Richard Taylor, commander of the District of West Louisiana, attempted to recapture the Union gains, both to cut Bank's communications with New Orleans and possibly to recapture the city itself. While successful in some battles, the Confederates failed in both objectives.

== Notes ==
=== References ===
- Chaitin, Peter M. The Coastal War: Chesapeake Bay to Rio Grande. Alexandria, Va.: Time-Life Books, 1984. ISBN 0-8094-4732-0.
- Kennedy, Frances H. (editor) The Civil War Battlefield Guide, 2nd edition. New York: Houghton Mifflin Company, 1998. ISBN 0-395-74012-6.
- Symonds, Craig L. A Battlefield Atlas of the Civil War. Annapolis, MD.: Nautical and Aviation Publishing Company of America, 1983. ISBN 0-933852-40-1.
