= Lorin Miller =

Mayor of Omaha

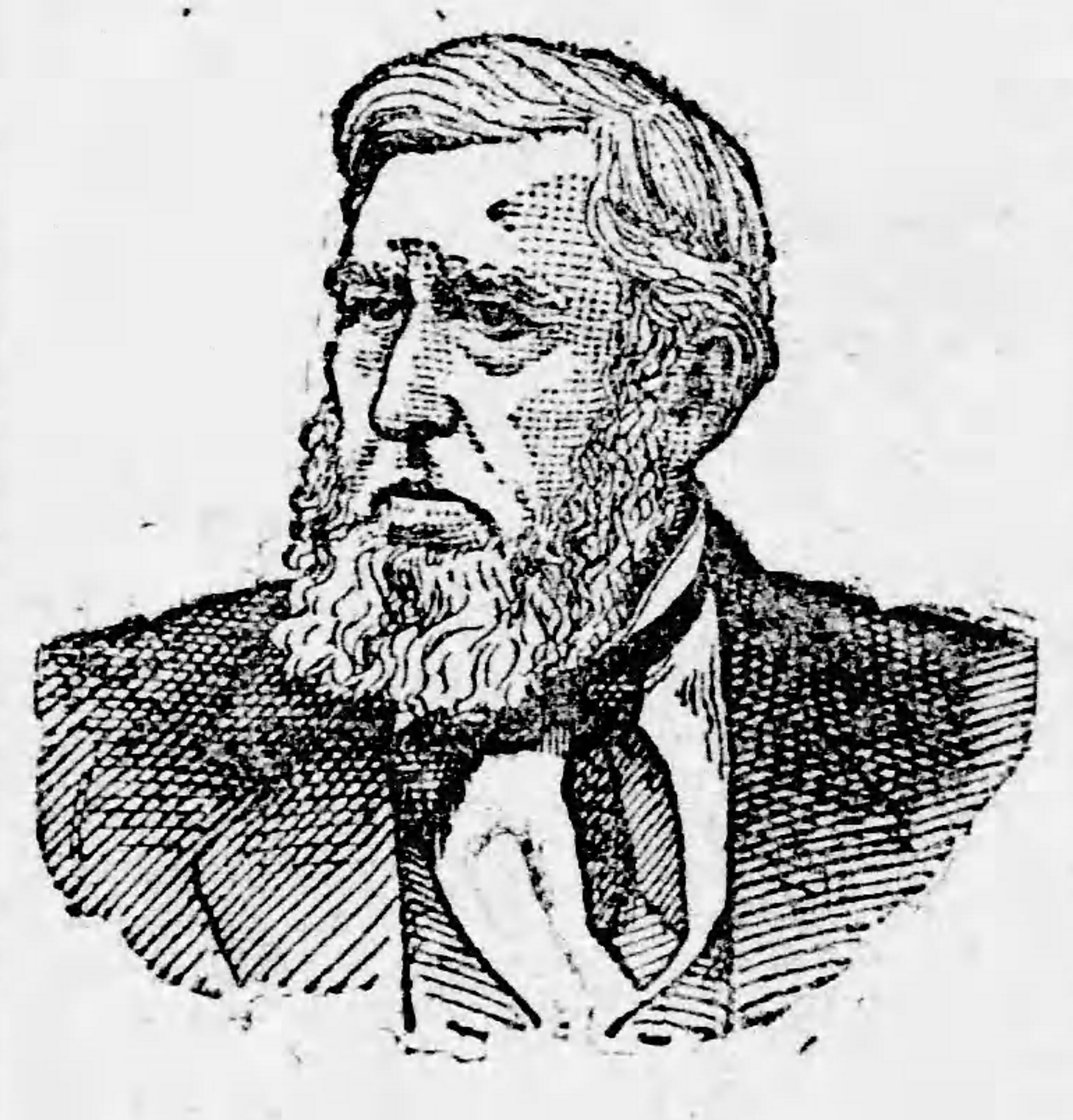

Mayor of Omaha
- In office 1866–1867
- Preceded by: Addison R. Gilmore
- Succeeded by: Charles H. Brown

Personal details
- Born: 1800 Westmoreland, New York, U.S.
- Died: September 30, 1888 Omaha, Nebraska, U.S.
- Occupation: Politician

Lorin Miller (1800 – September 30, 1888) was an early citizen of Omaha, Nebraska. He served as the mayor from 1866 to 1867.

== Early life ==
Lorin Miller was born in 1800 in Westmoreland, New York. His family had previously lived in Vermont for several generations.

In his early career, Miller was a land surveyor and worked as an engineer in states including New York and Wisconsin.

== Life in Nebraska ==
Miller moved to Nebraska on October 19, 1854, and settled in the area that would become Omaha. As the settlement grew, he surveyed areas including Jeffrey's addition and Scriptown.

From 1866 to 1867, Miller served as mayor of Omaha and police magistrate.

== Personal life ==
Miller was married around 1830 and had three children including prominent Omaha citizen George L. Miller.

Miller died on September 30, 1888. He was 88 years old.

== See also ==
- History of Omaha
