= Jesse Lowe =

American mayor

Mayor of Omaha
- In office March 5, 1857 – March 2, 1858
- Preceded by: Office established
- Succeeded by: Andrew Jackson Poppleton

Personal details
- Born: March 11, 1814 Raleigh, North Carolina
- Died: April 3, 1868 (aged 54) Omaha, Nebraska
- Resting place: Forest Lawn Memorial Park
- Occupation: Politician, real estate, ferries

Jesse Lowe (March 11, 1814 – April 3, 1868) was the first mayor of Omaha, Nebraska, serving for one year from March 5, 1857 to March 2, 1858. An important real estate agent in the early city, Lowe is credited with naming the city after the Omaha Tribe.

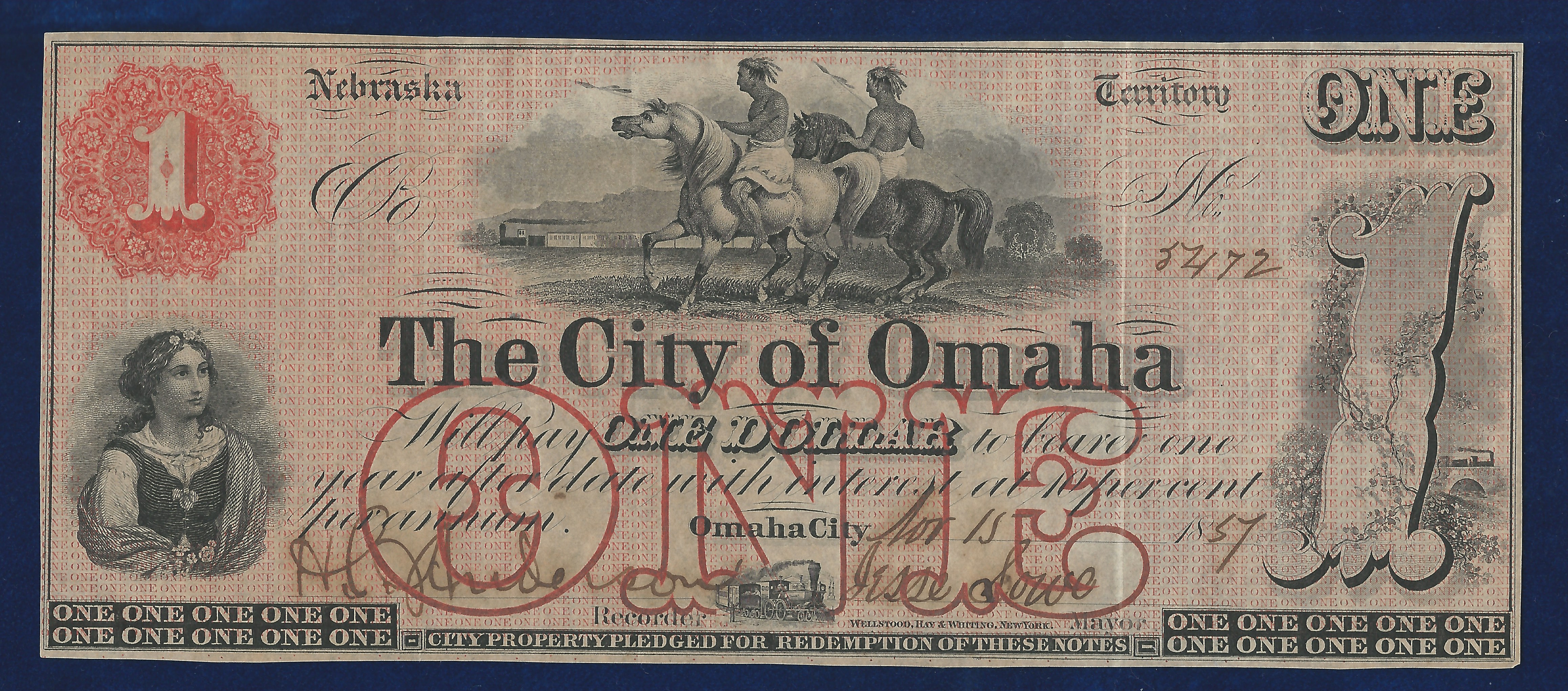
USA, Nebraska Territory, $1 City of Omaha 1857 uniface banknote. The note is signed by Jesse Lowe in his function as Mayor of Omaha City. It was issued as scrip in 1857 to help fund the erection of a territorial capitol building.

== Biography ==
Lowe was born in Raleigh, North Carolina, and along with his brother Enos, the family soon afterward moved to the Indiana Territory, settling in Monroe County. Lowe's parents were strict Quakers. Jesse receiving his education at Bloomington College. After studying law and interning with Tilghman Howard in Indiana, Lowe decided not to become a lawyer, instead serving in the commissary of a Missouri volunteer regiment under Sterling Price. He was promoted to Paymaster in the U.S. Army served during the entire Mexican–American War. In 1853 he moved to Council Bluffs, Iowa where his brother was the city's tax collector.

On July 3, 1853, Lowe crossed the Missouri River with his brother Enos into Indian Territory, estimating the land across from Council Bluffs was going to become a great city. Jesse Lowe staked out a quarter-section and later bought three other quarter-sections, totaling 640 acres (2.6 km^{2}). Within a week he established the "Oak Grove Farm."

Lowe was a founding member of the Omaha Claim Club in 1854, and assisted Alfred D. Jones in the first survey of the city. In 1855 he built the first bank building in Omaha at 12th and Farnam Streets in present-day Downtown Omaha. Lowe also invested in the Council Bluffs and Nebraska Ferry Company, which was the foremost ferry company in Omaha for more than 25 years.

Lowe was married to Sophia Hoppin on July 3, 1856, in Burlington, New Jersey. They had four children, including Frederick Brown Lowe, Charlotte Augusta Lowe, Jesse Lowe Jr., and Tilghman Howard Lowe.

Jesse Lowe died in 1868, in Omaha. He is buried at the Forest Lawn Memorial Park in Omaha.

== Legacy ==
Lowe's legacy is readily apparent in the city of Omaha. The Jesse Lowe Conference Room, named in his honor, was located on the third floor of the Civic Center.

== See also ==
- History of Omaha
- Founding figures of Omaha, Nebraska

Preceded by none	Mayor of Omaha; 1857-1858	Succeeded by Andrew Jackson Poppleton
