= Byron Reed =

American real estate businessman

Byron Reed, 1854–1904 Nebraskans

Byron Reed (March 12, 1829 – June 6, 1891) was an American pioneer real estate businessman and local politician in Omaha, Nebraska. He founded the first real estate office in the Nebraska Territory and became the foremost agent after Nebraska achieved statehood.

== Biography ==
Reed was born in Darien, Genesee County, New York. While he was attending the Alexander Classical School, Reed's family moved to Darien, Wisconsin. At the age of 20 he took a job as a telegraph operator, working in Warren, Ohio until 1855. He also served at the Register of Deeds for Trumbull County during this time.

Reed came to Omaha in late 1855, the year the city was founded. By the early 1860s he had accumulated a variety of land holdings across the city. As Omaha became an important gateway to the West and its economy boomed, Reed became very rich and assumed a prominent position in the business and political affairs of both the city and the state. In a time when correspondents were frequently targeted, Reed was working as a correspondent of the New York Tribune and traveling throughout southern Nebraska, Kansas and Missouri to cover the Border Ruffians battles.

In March 1856 he opened an office in the old State House building in Downtown Omaha and established a real estate business. Within three years the business was incorporated, and Reed's business was regarded as successful. That year he acquired the land surrounding the Prospect Hill Cemetery, and ten years later he donated it to the City of Omaha. Reed was instrumental in the formation of the Forest Lawn Cemetery Association and brokered the turn over of Prospect Hill to it in 1885.

Throughout the rest of his life Reed was a surveyor, abstractor and land developer, creating many of the subdivisions that grew around downtown Omaha.

The company he founded in 1856 is still active in Omaha today.

== Political involvement ==
In 1860 he was elected City Clerk in Omaha, serving until 1867. From 1861 to 1863 he served as deputy County Clerk of Douglas County, and in 1863 he was elected to a two-year term as County Clerk. Starting in 1871 he served on the Omaha City Council, acting as president in 1872.

== Byron Reed Collection ==
Byron Reed found time to collect rare books, manuscripts, autographs and American coins, in which last field he was preeminent; according to numismatists, "Byron Reed was one of the greatest collectors of the 19th century," with a reputation as a coin collector that is "largely unrecognized." His collection of colonial and United States coinage, paper money and sutlers' tokens is thought to be one of the most complete in the United States, and his numismatic library is one of the largest in the Midwestern United States; according to experts, the library is probably the last private numismatic library formed in the 19th century to remain intact. Donated to the City of Omaha upon Reed's death, today the collection is housed at the Durham Western Heritage Museum.

== See also ==
- History of Omaha
- Founding figures of Omaha, Nebraska
