= List of mayors of Omaha, Nebraska =

Mayor of Omaha, Nebraska

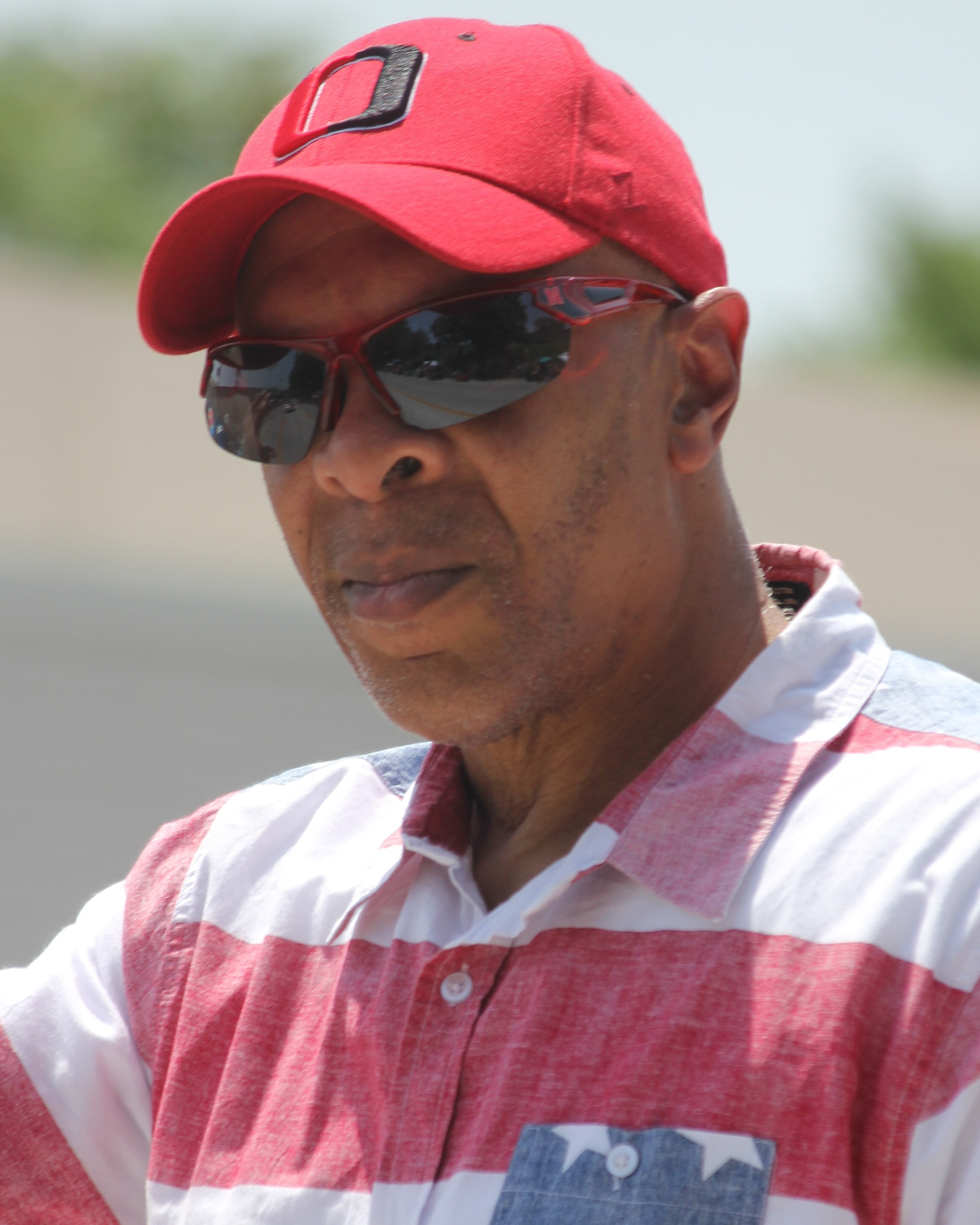
- Incumbent; John Ewing Jr. since June 9, 2025
- Style: His Honor; The Honorable
- Seat: Omaha City Hall
- Term length: Four years
- Inaugural holder: Jesse Lowe
- Formation: 19th Century
- Website: mayors-office.cityofomaha.org

This is a list of mayors of Omaha, Nebraska, United States.

== List of mayors ==
No.	Image	Name (birth–death)	Term	Party affiliation	Notes
1		Jesse Lowe (1814–1868)	March 5, 1857 – March 2, 1858	Democratic	
2		Andrew Jackson Poppleton (1830–1896)	March 2, 1858 – September 14, 1858	Democratic	
3		George Robert Armstrong (1819–1896) (interim mayor)	September 14, 1858 – March 10, 1859	Democratic	
4		David Douglas Belden (1821–1897)	March 10, 1859 – March 6, 1860	Democratic	
5		Clinton Briggs (1828–1882)	March 6, 1860 – March 5, 1861	Republican	
6		George Robert Armstrong (1819–1896)	March 5, 1861 – November 5, 1862 (Note: Resigned.)	Democratic	
7		Benjamin Eli Barnet Kennedy (1827–1916) (interim mayor)	November 5, 1862 – March 15, 1864	Democratic	
8		Addison R. Gilmore (1804–1866)	March 15, 1864 – March 9, 1865	Democratic	
9		Lorin Miller (1800–1888)	March 9, 1865 – March 6, 1867	Democratic	
10		Charles H. Brown (1834–1897)	March 6, 1867 – March 4, 1868	Democratic	
11		George M. Roberts (1843–1906)	March 4, 1868 – June 7, 1869	Republican	
12		Ezra Millard (1833–1886)	June 7, 1869 – April 10, 1871	Democratic	
13		Smith Samuel Caldwell (1834–1884)	April 10, 1871 – April 9, 1872	Republican	
14		Joseph Millard (1836–1922)	April 9, 1872 – April 7, 1873	Republican	
15		William M. Brewer (?–1921)	April 7, 1873 – February 3, 1874 (Note: Resigned.)	Democratic	
Acting		James S. Gibson (1835–1906)	February 3, 1874 – April 13, 1874	Democratic	
16		Champion S. Chase (1820–1898)	April 13, 1874 – April 9, 1879	Republican	First elected to a one-year term in 1874 and then to a two-year term in 1875 after Omaha extended the mayoral term to two years.
17		Reuben H. Wilbur (1825–1898)	April 9, 1877 – April 7, 1879	Republican	
18		Champion S. Chase (1820–1898)	April 7, 1879 – April 12, 1881	Republican	
19		James E. Boyd (1834–1906)	April 12, 1881 – April 12, 1883	Democratic	
20		Champion S. Chase (1820–1898)	April 10, 1883 – June 30, 1884 (Note: Removed from office.)	Republican	
Acting		Patrick F. Murphy (?–1885)	June 30, 1884 – April 14, 1885	Republican	
21		James E. Boyd (1834–1906)	April 14, 1885 – May 10, 1887	Democratic	
22		William J. Broatch (1841–1922)	May 10, 1887 – January 7, 1890	Republican	
23		Richard C. Cushing (1843–1913)	January 7, 1890 – January 5, 1892	Democratic	
24		George P. Bemis (1838–1916)	January 5, 1892 – January 7, 1896	Republican	
25		William J. Broatch (1841–1922)	January 7, 1896 – May 12, 1897	Republican	
26		Frank E. Moores † (1840–1906)	May 12, 1897– March 23, 1906 (Note: Died in office.) (Note: May have served illegally.)	Republican	
Acting		Harry B. Zimman (1879–1936)	March 23, 1906 – May 21, 1906	Republican	
27		James Dahlman (1856–1930)	May 21, 1906 – May 13, 1918	Democratic	
28		Edward Parsons Smith (1860–1930)	May 13, 1918 – May 17, 1921	Democratic	
29		James Dahlman† (1856–1930)	May 17, 1921 – January 21, 1930 (Note: Died in office.)	Democratic	
Acting		John H. Hopkins (1886–1954)	January 21, 1930 – February 4, 1930	Democratic	
30		Richard Lee Metcalfe (1861–1954) (interim mayor)	February 4, 1930 – May 16, 1933	Democratic	
31		Roy Nathan Towl (1881–1974)	May 16, 1933 – May 26, 1936	Republican	
32		Dan B. Butler (1879–1953)	May 26, 1936 – May 29, 1945	Democratic	
33		Charles W. Leeman (1892–1979)	May 29, 1945 – May 25, 1948	Democratic	
34		Glenn Cunningham (1912–2003)	May 25, 1948 – May 25, 1954	Republican	
35		Johnny Rosenblatt (1907–1979)	May 25, 1954 – May 22, 1961	Democratic	First Jewish mayor of Omaha
36	Mayor James Dworak	James Dworak (1925–2002)	May 22, 1961 – May 24, 1965	Democratic	
37		Alexander V. Sorensen (1905–1982)	May 24, 1965 – May 26, 1969	Republican	
38		Eugene A. Leahy (1929–2000)	May 26, 1969 – May 28, 1973	Democratic	
39		Edward Zorinsky (1928–1987)	May 28, 1973 – November 16, 1976 (Note: Resigned.)	Republican (before 1975)	Second Jewish mayor. Resigned after winning election to the U.S. Senate.
39		Edward Zorinsky (1928–1987)	May 28, 1973 – November 16, 1976	Democratic (1975-1987)	Second Jewish mayor. Resigned after winning election to the U.S. Senate.
40		Robert G. Cunningham (1923–2014) (interim mayor)	November 16, 1976 – June 6, 1977	Republican	Succeeded mayor Edward Zorinsky, who won election to the U.S. Senate. Stepped down on June 6, 1977 to serve on the State Game and Parks Commission.
41		Al Veys (1919–2002)	June 6, 1977 – June 8, 1981	Democratic	
42		Mike Boyle (1944–2021)	June 8, 1981 – January 26, 1987 (Note: Removed from office.)	Democratic	
Acting		Stephen H. Tomasek, Jr. (1920–2001)	January 26, 1987 – February 6, 1987	Democratic	City Council President Tomasek served as acting mayor after mayor Mike Boyle was recalled.
43		Bernard R. Simon† (1927–1988) (interim mayor)	February 6, 1987 – April 14, 1988 (Note: Died in office.)	Democratic	Named mayor by the City Council on February 3, 1987 after mayor Mike Boyle was recalled. Simon died on April 14, 1988. City Council President Fred Conley served as acting mayor until the council was able to convene to name an interim mayor.
Acting		Fred L. Conley (b. 1948)	April 14, 1988 – April 20, 1988	Democratic	First African American councilmember in Omaha. As president of the city council, Conley served as acting mayor after the death of interim mayor Bernie Simon on April 14, 1988.
44		Walt Calinger (b. 1940) (interim mayor)	April 20, 1988 – June 5, 1989	Democratic	Named interim mayor on April 20, 1988 by a 4-3 vote of the city council to finish the unexpired term of Bernie Simon.
45		P. J. Morgan (b. 1940)	June 5, 1989 – June 10, 1994 (Note: Resigned.)	Republican	
Acting		Subby Anzaldo (1933–2019)	June 10, 1994 – January 9, 1995	Democratic	
46		Hal Daub (b. 1941)	January 9, 1995 – June 10, 2001	Republican	
47		Mike Fahey (b. 1943)	June 10, 2001 – June 8, 2009	Democratic	
48		Jim Suttle (b. 1944)	June 8, 2009 – June 10, 2013	Democratic	
49		Jean Stothert (b. 1954)	June 10, 2013 – June 9, 2025	Republican	First woman mayor of Omaha
50		John Ewing Jr. (b. 1961)	June 9, 2025 – Incumbent	Democratic	First African American elected mayor of Omaha

== See also ==
- Government of Omaha
- History of Omaha
