= 2025 Omaha mayoral election =

Election in Nebraska

- May 13, 2025
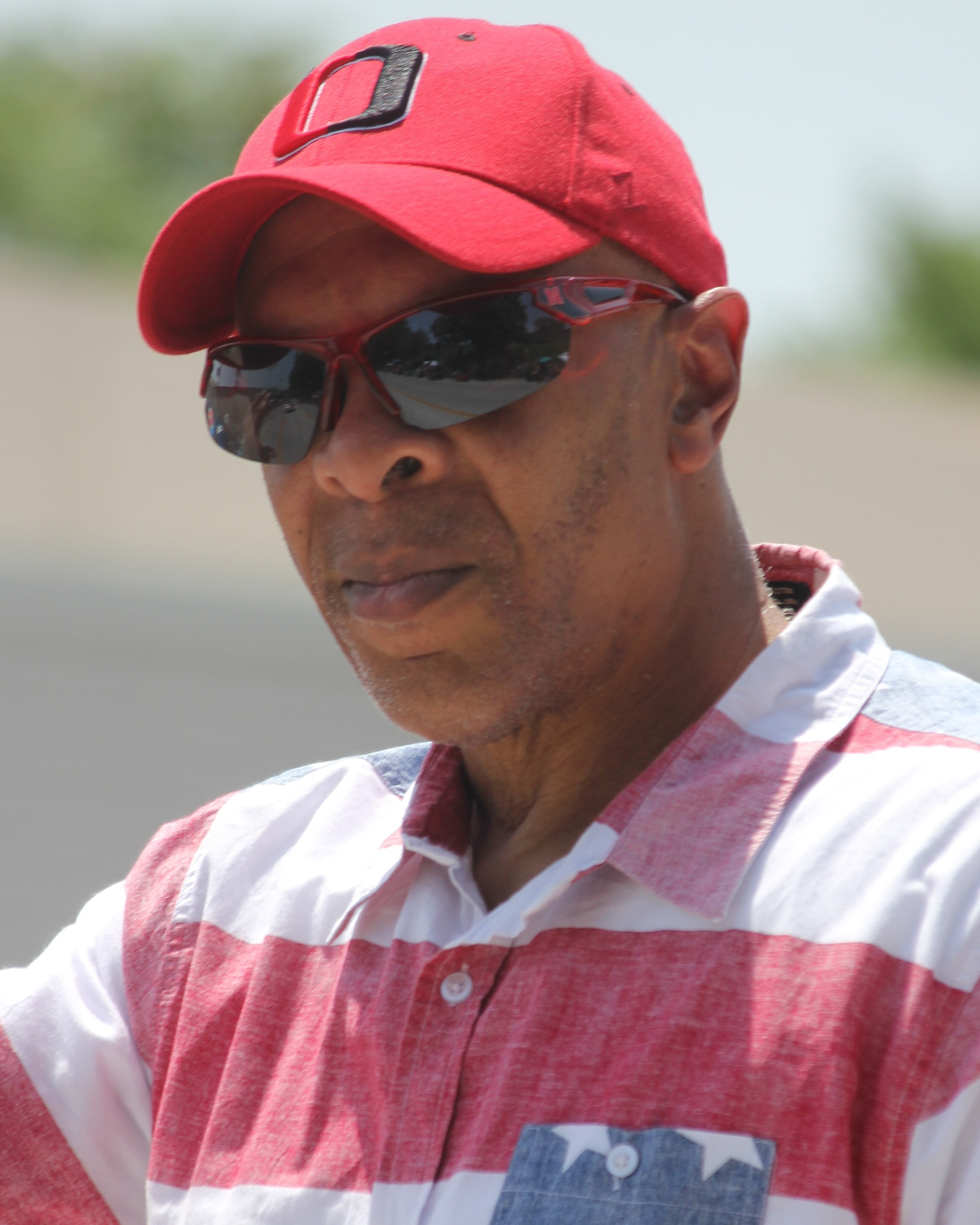

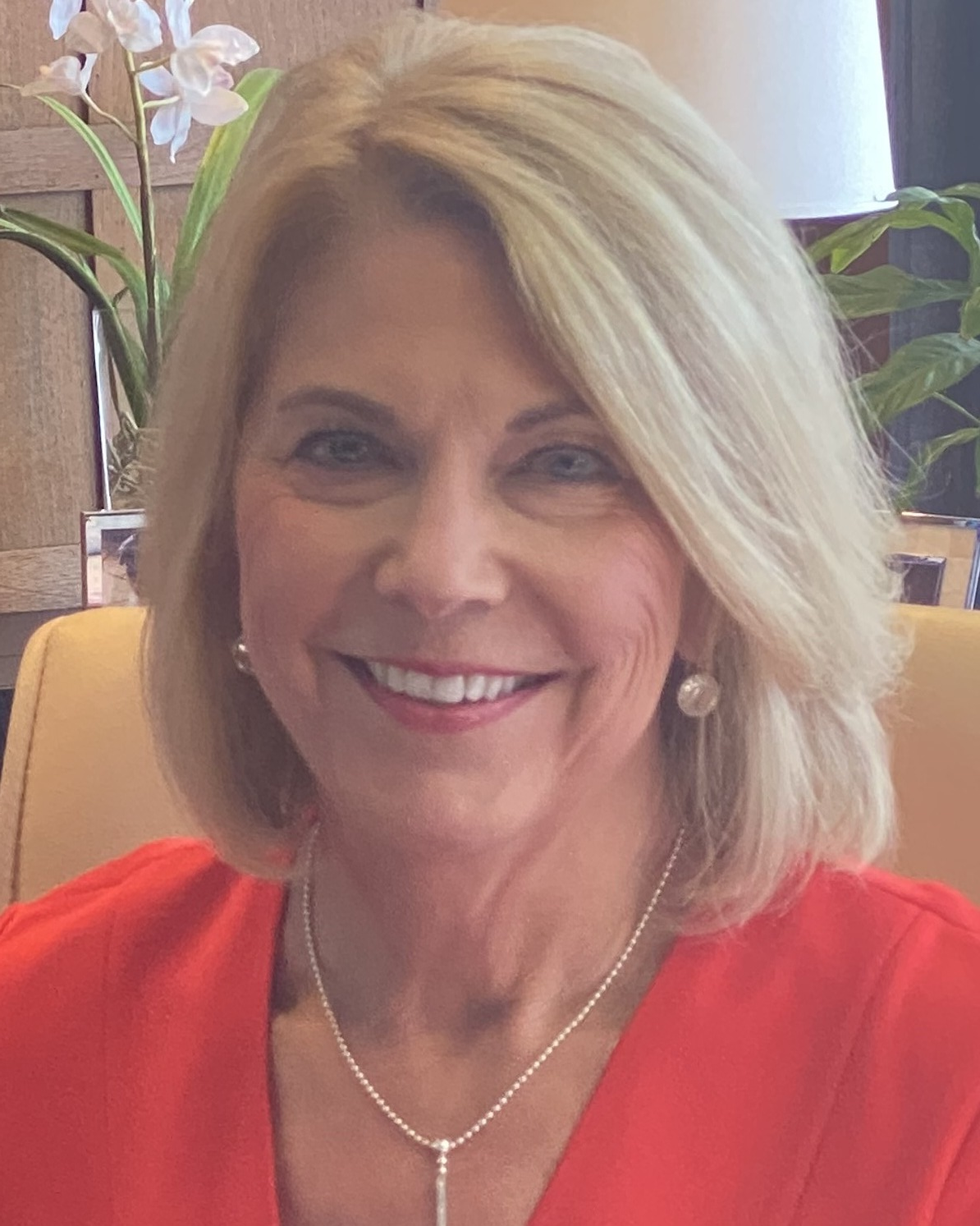
Candidate	John Ewing	Jean Stothert
Popular vote	53,671	40,531
Percentage	56.81%	42.90%

Ewing:
50–60%
60–70%
70–80%
80–90%
90–100%
Stothert:
50–60%
60–70%
70–80%
Mayor before election
Jean Stothert
Republican
Elected mayor
John Ewing
Democratic

The 2025 Omaha mayoral election was held on May 13, 2025, to elect the mayor of Omaha, Nebraska. A primary election was held on April 1, in which the two highest-placing candidates advanced to the general election on May 13. Municipal elections in Omaha are officially nonpartisan.

Incumbent Republican mayor Jean Stothert ran for re-election to what would have been a record fourth term in office, but was defeated by Democrat John Ewing. Ewing became the first elected African American mayor of Omaha, and the first Democratic mayor to be elected since 2009.

== Background ==
Incumbent mayor, Republican Jean Stothert was re-elected in 2021 after defeating R.J. Neary by a margin of 29.62%. The last mayor affiliated with the Democratic Party to be elected was Jim Suttle in 2009.

The filing deadline to appear on the ballot was February 28, 2025.

== Primary election ==
=== Candidates ===
==== Advanced ====
- John Ewing, Douglas County Treasurer and nominee for Nebraska's 2nd congressional district in 2012 (Party preference: Democratic)
- Jean Stothert, incumbent mayor (Party preference: Republican)

==== Eliminated in primary ====
- Terry Brewer, community organizer (Party preference: Independent)
- Jasmine Harris, public health official and candidate for mayor in 2021 (Party preference: Democratic)
- Mike McDonnell, state senator and former chief of the Omaha Fire Department (Party preference: Republican)

==== Declined ====
- Pete Festersen, president of the Omaha City Council and candidate for Nebraska's 2nd congressional district in 2014 (Party preference: Democratic) (ran for re-election)

=== Campaign ===
Key issues in the campaign included crime, infrastructure, and affordable housing. Controversies surrounding the Omaha Streetcar project and the usage of Tax Increment Financing have also served as the center of messaging and debates between candidates in the campaign.

==== Candidate-related controversies ====
Controversy arose when an anonymous Reddit user posted screenshots of an email exchange between Nebraska Democratic Party chair Jane Kleeb and Mike McDonnell's campaign manager, which showed that Kleeb had sent photos of an anti-Stothert advertisement to McDonnell's campaign several weeks before it was released to the public. Both Democrats in the race, John Ewing and Jasmine Harris, criticized Kleeb's action. Rumors spread that the Nebraska Democratic Party was supporting the Republican McDonnell's candidacy, possibly in exchange for his vote to preserve Nebraska's split Electoral College vote system. These allegations were denied by McDonnell's campaign and by Nebraska Democratic Party executive director Precious McKesson, who affirmed the party's support for Ewing and Harris.

McDonnell also attracted controversy over racially-charged remarks about a city official whom Stothert appointed to work on homelessness, claiming the employee to be "a DEI hire" and suggesting that the employee is responsible for the growing rate of homelessness. Stothert, Ewing, and Harris all criticized McDonnell's comments, with Stothert labelling the comments as sexist and Ewing characterizing the comment as McDonnell "resorting to bullying and intimidation."

Stothert has also been scrutinized over her frequent absences during her tenure, and allegations that she has moved out of the state.

=== Endorsements ===
Mike McDonnell (R)

State senators

- Steve Halloran, 33rd district (2017–2025)
- Burke Harr, 8th district (2011–2019) (Democratic)
- Julie Slama, 1st district (2019–2025)

Local officials

- Mike Fahey, former mayor of Omaha (2001–2009) (Democratic)
- P. J. Morgan, Douglas County commissioner from the 4th district (2010–present) and former mayor of Omaha (1989–1994)

Labor unions

- International Association of Fire Fighters Local 385
- Omaha Police Officer's Association

Individuals

- Dan Osborn, former president of Bakery, Confectionery, Tobacco Workers and Grain Millers International Union Local 50G (Independent)

Party chapters

- Douglas County Libertarian Party
- Douglas County Republican Party
Jean Stothert (R)

Governors

- Dave Heineman, former governor of Nebraska (2005–2015)
- Jim Pillen, governor of Nebraska (2023–present)

Local officials

- Kathy Bossman, Omaha Fire Chief (2023–present)
- Todd Schmaderer, Omaha Police Chief (2012–present)

Organizations

- League of United Latin American Citizens

=== Debates and forums ===
2025 Omaha mayoral primary debate
No.	Date	Host	Moderator	Link	Independent	Democratic	Democratic	Republican	Republican
Key: P Participant A Absent N Not invited I Invited W Withdrawn									
Key: P Participant A Absent N Not invited I Invited W Withdrawn					Brewer	Ewing	Harris	McDonnell	Stothert
1	March 11, 2025	WOWT; Omaha Press Club	Brian Mastre		P	P	P	P	P
2	March 16, 2025	KETV	Bill Schammert		P	P	P	P	P

=== Fundraising ===
Campaign finance reports as of March 24, 2025
Candidate (party)	Raised	Spent	Cash on hand
Jean Stothert (R)	$423,487	$772,831	$264,907
Mike McDonnell (R)	$282,352	$240,064	$279,751
John Ewing (D)	$81,026	$89,804	$66,514
Jasmine Harris (D)	$32,607	$25,148	$8,430
Source: Nebraska Accountability and Disclosure Commission

=== Results ===
City council district results Stothert: 40–50%; Ewing: 30–40%; 40–50%; McDonnell: 30–40%

Precinct results Stothert: 20–30%; 30–40%; 40–50%; 50–60%; 60–70%; Ewing: 30–40%; 40–50%; 50–60%; 60–70%; McDonnell: 30–40%; 40–50%; 50–60%; Tie: 20–30%; 30–40%; No votes

2025 Omaha mayoral primary election results
Candidate	Votes	%
Jean Stothert (incumbent)	27,245	36.22%
John Ewing	24,605	32.72%
Mike McDonnell	15,039	20.00%
Jasmine Harris	7,706	10.25%
Terry Brewer	563	0.78%
Write-in	50	0.07%
Total votes	75,208	100.00%

== General election ==
=== Post-primary endorsements ===
John Ewing (D)

U.S. Senators

- Bob Kerrey, former U.S. senator (1989–2001) and former governor of Nebraska (1983–1987)
- Ben Nelson, former U.S. senator (2001–2013) and former governor of Nebraska (1991–1999)

State senators

- Mike McDonnell, 5th district (2017–2025) and 2025 mayoral candidate (Republican) (Note: McDonnell endorsed Ewing both in his capacity as the president of the Omaha Federation of Labor and by his own personal recommendation ahead of the union vote, per the article cited.)

Local officials

- Jim Cavanaugh, Douglas County commissioner (2015–present)
- P. J. Morgan, Douglas County commissioner from the 4th district (2010–present) and former mayor of Omaha (1989–1994) (Republican)

Other local officials

- Justin Bibb, mayor of Cleveland, Ohio (2022–present)
- Paige Cognetti, mayor of Scranton, Pennsylvania (2020–present)
- Kate Gallego, mayor of Phoenix, Arizona (2019–present)
- Todd Gloria, mayor of San Diego, California (2013–2014; 2022–present)
- Tim Keller, mayor of Albuquerque, New Mexico (2017–present)
- Ron Nirenberg, mayor of San Antonio, Texas (2017–2025)
- Satya Rhodes-Conway, mayor of Madison, Wisconsin (2019–present)

Labor unions

- International Association of Fire Fighters Local 385
- Nebraska and Omaha AFL-CIO
- Nebraska Building Trades Council

Party chapters

- Nebraska Democratic Party

Organizations

- National Conference of Democratic Mayors
- Sierra Club Nebraska Chapter
Jean Stothert (R)

Individuals

- Terry Brewer, pastor and 2025 mayoral candidate (Independent)
- Terence Crawford, professional boxer

Labor unions

- American Federation of State, County and Municipal Employees Local 251

Organizations

- National Latino Police Officers Association Omaha Chapter

=== Debates and forums ===
2025 Omaha mayoral general debate
No.	Date	Host	Moderator	Link	Democratic	Republican
Key: P Participant A Absent N Not invited I Invited W Withdrawn						
Key: P Participant A Absent N Not invited I Invited W Withdrawn					Ewing	Stothert
1	April 17, 2025	WOWT; Omaha Press Club	Brian Mastre		P	P
2	April 27, 2025	KETV	Rob McCartney		P	P

=== Fundraising ===
Campaign finance reports as of April 28, 2025
Candidate (party)	Raised	Spent	Cash on hand
Jean Stothert (R)	$903,927	$646,632	$257,295
John Ewing (D)	$535,602	$490,525	$45,077
Source: Nebraska Accountability and Disclosure Commission

=== Polling ===
Hypothetical polling

Jean Stothert vs. Mike McDonnell

Poll source	Date(s) administered	Sample size (Note: Key: A – all adults RV – registered voters LV – likely voters V – unclear)	Margin of error	Jean Stothert	Mike McDonnell	Undecided
Amp Research (Note: Poll conducted for McDonnell's campaign)	January 22–23, 2025	400 (LV)	± 4.9%	34%	37%	28%

=== Results ===
2025 Omaha mayoral general election results
Candidate	Votes	%
John Ewing	53,671	56.81%
Jean Stothert (incumbent)	40,531	42.90%
Write-in	267	0.28%
Total votes	94,469	100.00%
Turnout	94,821	32.35%
Registered electors	293,072	

Results by city council district
District	John Ewing		Jean Stothert		Write-ins		Total
District	#	%	#	%	#	%	Total
1	9,479	64.82%	5,107	34.92%	37	0.25%	14,623
2	6,963	81.78%	1,521	17.86%	30	0.35%	8,514
3	7,879	67.04%	3,839	32.67%	34	0.29%	11,752
4	3,911	59.31%	2,643	40.08%	40	0.61%	6,594
5	5,427	40.88%	7,822	58.91%	28	0.21%	13,277
6	7,725	45.12%	9,357	54.66%	38	0.22%	17,120
7	7,309	49.34%	7,469	50.42%	35	0.24%	14,813

== Analysis ==
The election results garnered national attention for several reasons. With his win, Ewing became the first elected African American mayor of Omaha and the first Democrat to win an Omaha mayoral election since 2009. National analysts tied the race to an increase for support of Democratic candidates nationwide since the election of Donald Trump in 2024, whom Stothert publicly supported in spite of the Omaha-based 2nd congressional district of Nebraska providing a vote in the Electoral College for Kamala Harris. Local analysts also noted parallels with the 2001 mayoral election, in which then-mayor Hal Daub lost to businessman Mike Fahey.

Following the election, Nebraska Governor Jim Pillen blamed lack of turnout from Omaha-area Republicans for Stothert's loss. Other factors cited included the controversial streetcar project and continued dissatisfaction with the condition of local roads, an issue in the 2021 election as well.

== See also ==
- 2025 United States local elections

== Notes ==
Partisan sponsors
