= List of Creighton University alumni =

== Politics, military, and law ==
- Donald O. Aldridge, U.S. Air Force lieutenant general
- Marcia M. Anderson, first African-American woman to attain rank of major general in the USAR
- Brad Ashford, former member of the U.S. House of Representatives
- C. Shannon Bacon, incumbent chief justice of the New Mexico Supreme Court
- Merton W. Baker, U.S. Air Force major general
- Frank A. Barrett, former governor of Wyoming
- Richard M. Baughn, U.S. Air Force brigadier general
- Patrick Bourne, former member of the Nebraska Legislature
- Mike Boyle, former mayor of Omaha, Nebraska
- Albert Brown, 1927, oldest survivor of the Bataan Death March
- John Cavanaugh III, former member of the U.S. House of Representatives
- Ernie Chambers, member of the Nebraska Legislature
- William M. Connolly, justice of the Nebraska Supreme Court
- Barbara Cubin, former member of the U.S. House of Representatives
- Alfonza W. Davis, Tuskegee Airman
- Robert E. Davis, chief justice of the Kansas Supreme Court
- Robert V. Denney, former member of the U.S. House of Representatives
- Leo J. Dulacki, U.S. Marine Corps lieutenant general
- Mike Fahey, former mayor of Omaha, Nebraska
- Mike Friend, former member of the Nebraska Legislature
- Paul Gosar, member of the U.S. House of Representatives
- Roman Hruska, former senator of Nebraska
- Mike Johanns, former secretary of agriculture of the United States, former governor of Nebraska, former United States senator
- Philip M. Klutznick, former United States secretary of commerce
- John A. Knebel, former secretary of agriculture of the United States
- Steve Lathrop, member of the Nebraska Legislature
- Gertrude Lee, chief prosecutor of the Navajo Nation
- Lormong Lo, former city council president of Omaha City, Nebraska
- Ray Madden, former member of the U.S. House of Representatives
- Cheryl L. Mason, chairman, Board of Veterans' Appeals, US Department of Veterans' Affairs (2017–2022), inspector general, US Department of Veterans' Affairs (Incumbent)
- Francis P. Matthews, former secretary of the U.S. Navy
- Michael McCormack, justice of the Nebraska Supreme Court
- John McKay, former United States attorney
- Jack R. Miller, former senator of Iowa
- Michael R. Murphy, circuit judge on the United States Court of Appeals for the Tenth Circuit
- Sheila Nix, campaign chief of staff to Vice President Kamala Harris for the 2024 election campaign
- Jeremy Nordquist, member of the Nebraska Legislature
- Eugene O'Sullivan, former member of the U.S. House of Representatives
- John Pehle, executive director of the War Refugee Board in WWII
- Mike Reasoner, member of the Iowa House of Representatives
- Seth Rich, political activist
- Leo Ryan, former member of the U.S. House of Representatives
- Symone Sanders, Democratic strategist and spokesperson
- J. Clay Smith Jr., former deputy chief of the Federal Communications Commission, former interim head of the Equal Employment Opportunity Commission, and former dean of Howard University School of Law
- Doug Struyk, member of the Iowa House of Representatives
- Patrick Sullivan, former member of the Wyoming House of Representatives
- Lee Terry, member of the U.S. House of Representatives
- Ginni Thomas, conservative lawyer, lobbyist, and wife of U.S. Supreme Court Justice Clarence Thomas
- Nancy Thompson, former member of the Nebraska Legislature
- Tom White, member of the Nebraska Legislature
- Edward Zorinsky, former senator of Nebraska

== Authors, media, and entertainment ==
- William Dozier, film and television producer, and actor
- Ron Hansen, novelist, essayist, and professor
- Paul Henderson, reporter for The Seattle Times, winner of the Pulitzer Prize for Investigative Reporting in 1982
- Rachelle Hruska, founder of Guest of a Guest
- James Keogh, executive editor of Time magazine; head of the White House speechwriting staff under Richard M. Nixon
- Michael MacCambridge, author
- Matt Maginn, bass player of Cursive
- Matt Peckham, critic for Time
- Colleen Williams, Los Angeles news anchor
- Mary Alice Williams, former co-anchor of Weekend Today

== Business ==
- Jackie Gaughan, former casino owner
- Cathy Hughes, founder and chairman of Radio One, first African-American woman to head a publicly traded corporation, namesake of Howard University's School of Communications
- Don Keough, former president and chief operating officer of Coca-Cola
- Rich Ricci, former head of investment management at Barclays
- Joe Ricketts, founder and former chairman of TD Ameritrade and owner of the Chicago Cubs
- Mark Walter, chief executive officer of Guggenheim Partners and controlling owner of the Los Angeles Dodgers

== Science and medicine ==
- Michael P. Anderson, former NASA astronaut killed in the Space Shuttle Columbia disaster
- Constantino Méndieta, surgeon and physician

== Religion ==
- Curtis Guillory, boards of commissions member within the U.S. Conference of Catholic Bishops
- Nancey Murphy, Christian theologian and writer

== Athletes ==
=== Basketball ===
- Trey Alexander, current NBA player for the Utah Jazz
- Wally Anderzunas, former NBA player
- Benoit Benjamin, former NBA player
- Rodney Buford, former NBA player
- Justin Carter (born 1987), player for Maccabi Kiryat Gat of the Israeli Premier League
- Bill Fitch, former NBA coach
- Marcus Foster (born 1995), basketball player for Hapoel Tel Aviv of the Israeli Basketball Premier League
- Chad Gallagher, former NBA player
- Ronnie Harrell (born 1996), basketball player for Hapoel Gilboa Galil of the Israeli Basketball Premier League
- Neil Johnson, former NBA player
- Ryan Kalkbrenner, current NBA player for the Charlotte Hornets
- Kyle Korver (born 1981), former NBA player for the Milwaukee Bucks
- Doug McDermott, current NBA player for the Sacramento Kings; consensus national college player of the year in 2014
- Kevin McKenna, former NBA player
- Justin Patton (born 1997), player for Hapoel Eilat of the Israeli Basketball Premier League
- Bob Portman, former NBA player
- Ryan Nembhard, current NBA player for the Dallas Mavericks
- Alex O'Connell, professional basketball player
- Baylor Scheierman, current NBA player for the Boston Celtics
- Paul Silas, former NBA player and coach
- Alex Stivrins, former NBA player
- Khyri Thomas (born 1996), basketball player for Maccabi Tel Aviv of the Israeli Basketball Premier League and the EuroLeague
- Anthony Tolliver (born 1985), NBA player for the Minnesota Timberwolves
- Maurice Watson (born 1993), player for Maccabi Rishon LeZion of the Israeli Basketball Premier League
- Ethan Wragge (born 1990), played in Germany with Gießen 46ers
- Marcus Zegarowski (born 1998), former NBA player for the Long Island Nets

=== Baseball ===
- Kimera Bartee, former MLB player
- Alan Benes, former MLB player
- Ty Blach, MLB pitcher for the Baltimore Orioles
- Tom Drees, former MLB player
- Bob Gibson, All-Star Hall of Fame pitcher with the St. Louis Cardinals, 1959–1975
- Chad Meyers, former MLB player
- Brian O'Connor, head coach, University of Virginia baseball team
- Dennis Rasmussen, former MLB pitcher
- Darin Ruf, former MLB player
- Scott Servais, former MLB player; former manager of the Seattle Mariners
- Scott Stahoviak, former MLB player
- Pat Venditte, MLB switch pitcher

=== Soccer ===
- David Abidor (born 1992), soccer player
- Andrew Duran, former MLS player and the 15th overall pick by the Seattle Sounders FC in the 2012 MLS SuperDraft
- Ethan Finlay, current member of the Minnesota United FC and the 10th overall pick in the 2012 MLS SuperDraft
- Andrei Gotsmanov, former member of Minnesota United FC of the North American Soccer League and the 24th overall pick in the 2009 MLS SuperDraft
- Brendan Hines-Ike, current member of the KV Kortrijk
- Brian Holt, current member of the Philadelphia Union
- Greg Jordan, former MLS player and the 32nd overall pick by the Philadelphia Union in the 2012 MLS SuperDraft
- Ryan Junge, former MLS player
- Brian Kamler, former MLS player
- Duncan McGuire, MLS player and Olympian
- Eric Miller, 5th overall pick in the 2014 MLS SuperDraft
- Brian Mullan, current member of the Colorado Rapids, 9th overall pick in the 2001 MLS SuperDraft, has made four appearances for the United States national team
- Richard Mulrooney, former MLS player and the 40th overall pick by F.C. Dallas in the 2005 MLS SuperDraft
- Julian Nash, former MLS player
- Andrew Peterson, former MLS player
- Tyler Polak, former MLS player and the 22nd overall pick by the New England Revolution in the 2012 MLS SuperDraft
- Angel Rivillo, 70th overall pick by the Dallas Burn in the 2000 MLS SuperDraft
- Chris Schuler, current member of the Real Salt Lake and the 39th overall pick in the 2010 MLS SuperDraft
- Seth Sinovic, current member of the Sporting Kansas City and the 25th overall pick in the 2010 MLS SuperDraft
- David Wagenfuhr, former MLS player and the 31st overall pick by the Dallas Burn in the 2004 MLS SuperDraft
- David Wright, former member of the Pittsburgh Riverhounds of the USL Professional Division and the 25th overall pick in the 2000 MLS SuperDraft

== See also ==
- Creighton University
- People from Omaha, Nebraska
