= 2021 Omaha mayoral election =

- May 11, 2021
- Turnout: 32.7%
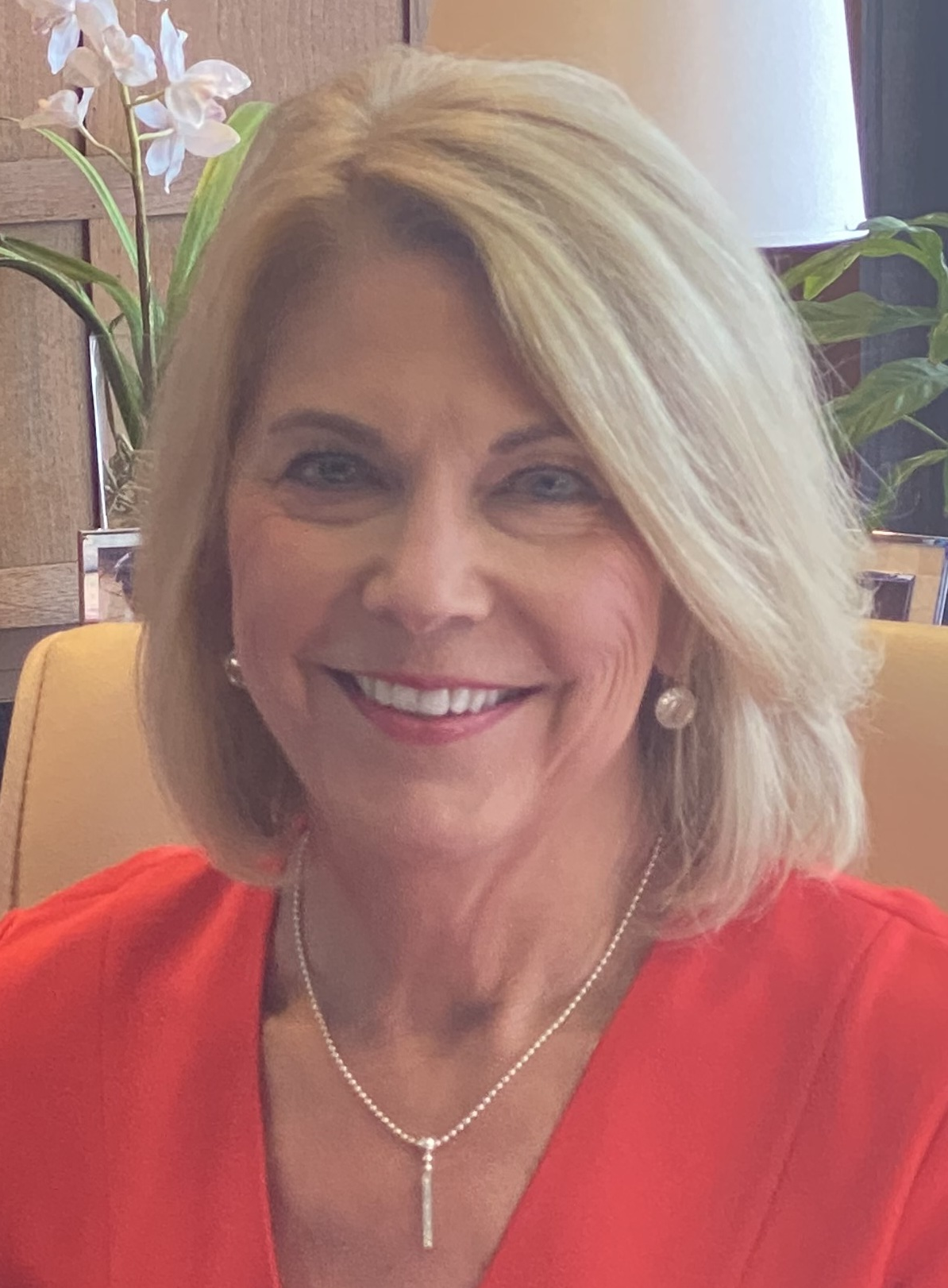

Candidate	Jean Stothert	RJ Neary
Popular vote	62,646	33,822
Percentage	64.76%	34.14%

Stothert:
40–50%
50–60%
60–70%
70–80%
80–90%
Neary:
40–50%
50–60%
60–70%
70–80%
No Votes
Mayor before election
Jean Stothert
Republican
Elected mayor
Jean Stothert
Republican

The 2021 Omaha mayoral election was held in 2021. Incumbent Republican mayor Jean Stothert was re-elected to a third term in office. Stothert is the first person elected to a third consecutive term as mayor of Omaha in the modern era.

The position of mayor in Omaha is officially a non-partisan position. A blanket primary was held on April 6, 2021. The top two finishers in the primary moved on to the general election which was held on May 11, 2021.

Alongside the mayor, the Omaha City Council was up for re-election. It is also officially non-partisan. However, it remained controlled by a Democratic majority, as only district 7 has a general election between a Democrat and a Republican. Districts 1, 2, 3, 4 remained Democratic whereas districts 5 and 6 remained Republican. The incumbent Republican in district 7 was re-elected as well.

== Primary election ==
=== Candidates ===
==== Declared ====
- Mark Gudgel, high school English teacher (Party preference: Democratic)
- Jasmine Harris, public health official (Party preference: Democratic)
- RJ Neary, real estate broker (Party preference: Democratic)
- Kimara Snipes, member of the Omaha school board (Party preference: Democratic)
- Jean Stothert, incumbent mayor (Party preference: Republican)

==== Failed to qualify ====
- Dawaune Hayes, founder and director of North Omaha Information Support Everyone (endorsed Harris, then Neary)
- Bill Queen, comedian (Party preference: Libertarian)

==== Declined ====
- Jim Cavanaugh, Douglas County commissioner (Party preference: Democratic)

=== Debates and forums ===
2021 Omaha mayoral primary debate
No.	Date	Host	Moderator	Link	Republican	Democratic	Democratic	Democratic	Democratic	Democratic
Key: P Participant A Absent N Not invited I Invited W Withdrawn										
Key: P Participant A Absent N Not invited I Invited W Withdrawn					Stothert	Neary	Harris	Snipes	Gudgel	Hayes
1	March 31, 2021	Big Mama's; Black Men United	N/A	Facebook	P	P	P	P	A	A

=== Endorsements ===
Kimara Snipes (D)

Federal officials

- Ben Nelson, former U.S. Senator and former Governor of Nebraska

Local officials

- Don Preister, Bellevue city councilor, former president of the Bellevue city council, and former state senator

Individuals

- Ann Ashford, attorney, wife of former U.S. Representative Brad Ashford, and candidate for Nebraska's 2nd congressional district in 2020
- Kara Eastman, nonprofit executive and nominee for Nebraska's 2nd congressional district in 2018 and 2020
Jean Stothert (R)

Labor unions

- Omaha Police Union

Individuals

- Warren Buffett, investor, business tycoon, philanthropist, the chairman and CEO of Berkshire Hathaway, and world's seventh-wealthiest person. (Democrat)
RJ Neary (D)

Federal officials

- Bob Kerrey, former U.S. Senator and former Governor of Nebraska
- John Joseph Cavanaugh III, former U.S. representative for NE-02 (1977-1981)

State officials

- Burke Harr, former state senator

Local officials

- Mike Fahey, former mayor
- Jim Suttle, former mayor
- Garry Gernandt, former Omaha City Councillor
- Vinny Palermo, Omaha City Council

Organizations

- Omaha Federation of Labor
- Omaha Labor Council
Jasmine Harris (D)

Local officials

- Dawaune Hayes
Mark Gudgel (D)

Individuals

- Steven Kenneth "Destiny" Bonnell II, live streamer and political commentator

=== Results ===
Primary results by precinct Stothert: 30–40%; 40–50%; 50–60%; 60–70%; 70–80%; 80–90%; Harris: 30–40%; 40–50%; Snipes: 30–40%; No votes

2021 Omaha mayoral primary election results
Candidate	Votes	%
Jean Stothert (incumbent)	47,976	56.86%
RJ Neary	13,166	15.36%
Jasmine Harris	12,002	14.06%
Kimara Snipes	7,472	8.76%
Mark Gudgel	4,087	4.80%
Write-in	106	0.12%
Total votes	84,809	100.00%

== General election ==
=== Candidates ===
- Jean Stothert, incumbent mayor (Republican)
- RJ Neary, real estate broker (Democratic)

=== Debate and forums ===
2021 Omaha mayoral general debates and forums
No.	Date	Host	Moderator	Link	Participants	
P Participant A Absent N Non-invitee I Invitee W Withdrawn						
P Participant A Absent N Non-invitee I Invitee W Withdrawn					Stothert	Neary
1	April 22, 2021	WOWT	Brian Mastre	Facebook	P	P
2	April 26, 2021	KMTV	Jon Kipper	Facebook	P	P
3	May 2, 2021	KETV	Rob McCartney	KETV	P	P
4	May 4, 2021	Omaha by Design	N/A	Facebook	P	P
5	May 6, 2021	KFAB	N/A	Facebook	P	P

=== Endorsements ===
Jean Stothert (R)

U.S. Governors

- Dave Heineman, former Governor and former Lieutenant Governor

Local officials

- Donald Kleine, Douglas County Attorney, and former sheriff

Organization

- Omaha Police Union
- Omaha World-Herald

Individual

- Warren Buffett, investor and fifth-richest man in the world (Democrat)
RJ Neary (D)

U.S. Senators

- Bob Kerrey, former U.S. Senator and former Governor of Nebraska

U.S. Representatives

- John Joseph Cavanaugh III, former U.S. representative for NE-02 (1977-1981)

State Senator

- Burke Harr, former state senator
- Steve Lathrop, state senator

County commission

- Mike Boyle, Douglas County Commissioner, former mayor

Country Treasurer

- John Ewing, Douglas County Treasurer

Local officials

- Ben Gray, Omaha City Council
- Chris Jerram, Omaha City Council
- Dawaune Hayes, founder and director of North Omaha Information Support Everyone
- Garry Gernandt, former Omaha City Councillor
- Jasmine Harris, public health official
- Jim Suttle, former mayor
- Mark Gudgel, high school English teacher
- Mike Fahey, former mayor
- Vinny Palermo, Omaha City Council

Organizations

- Omaha Federation of Labor
- Omaha Labor Council
- Nebraska Democratic Party

Individuals

- Jane Kleeb, Chair of the Nebraska Democratic Party

==== Fundraising ====
Campaign finance reports as of April 26, 2021
Candidate (party)	Total receipts	Total disbursements	Cash on hand
Jean Stothert (R)	$1,129,681	$1,535,900	$406,219
RJ Neary (D)	$675,381	$728,668	$53,287
Source: Nebraska Accountability and Disclosure Commission

=== Results ===
2021 Omaha mayoral general election results
Candidate	Votes	%
Jean Stothert (incumbent)	62,646	64.76%
RJ Neary	33,822	34.14%
Write-in	859	0.90%
Total votes	97,327	100.00%

Results by City Council district
District	Jean Stothert Republican		RJ Neary Democratic		Write-ins		Total
District	#	%	#	%	#	%	Total
1	8,538	56.36%	6,424	42.41%	186	1.23%	15,148
2	3,101	40.51%	4,433	57.92%	120	1.57%	7,654
3	6,345	48.72%	6,425	49.34%	253	1.94%	13,023
4	4,563	64.13%	2,485	34.93%	67	0.94%	7,115
5	12,195	75.23%	3,959	24.42%	56	0.35%	16,210
6	15,389	74.96%	5,058	24.64%	83	0.40%	20,530
7	12,515	70.92%	5,038	28.55%	94	0.53%	17,647
