= John Ewing Jr. =

Mayor of Omaha, Nebraska since 2025

John Ewing
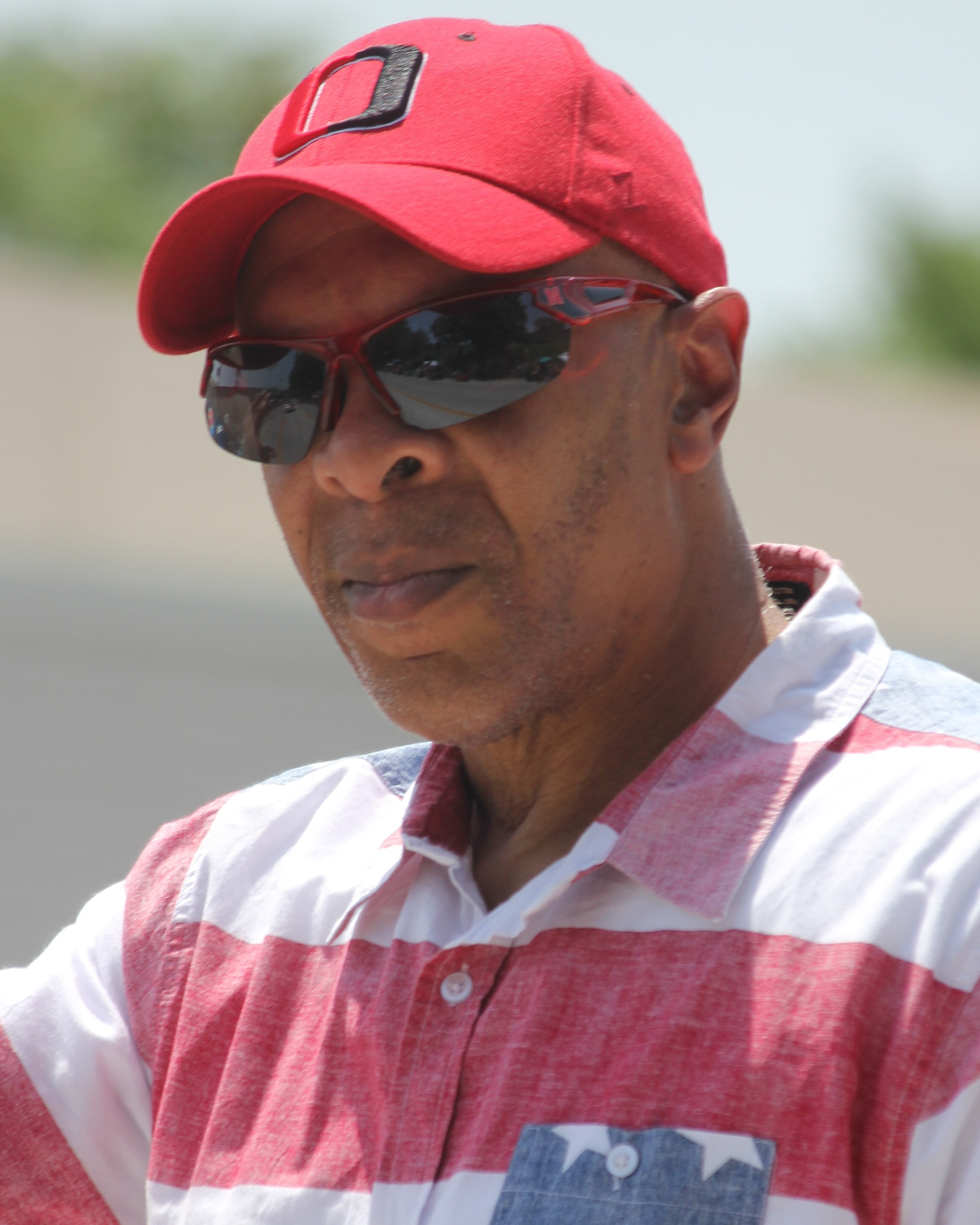
- Ewing in 2018

52nd Mayor of Omaha
- Incumbent
- Assumed office June 9, 2025
- Preceded by: Jean Stothert

Personal details
- Born: April 18, 1961 (age 65) Omaha, Nebraska, U.S.
- Party: Democratic
- Spouse: Viv Ewing
- Education: University of Nebraska, Omaha (BA, MA)

John Ewing Jr. (born April 18, 1961) is an American politician, minister, and former police officer serving as the 52nd mayor of Omaha, Nebraska, since 2025. A member of the Democratic Party, he was first elected in 2025, defeating incumbent Republican mayor Jean Stothert. Prior to his election as Mayor, Ewing served in the Omaha Police Department, retiring as a deputy police chief in 2006, and served as the Douglas County Treasurer from 2007 to 2025. Ewing was the Democratic nominee for Congress in 2012 in Nebraska's 2nd congressional district, narrowly losing to Republican Congressman Lee Terry.

Ewing is the first African American to be elected mayor of Omaha, and the first Democrat elected as Mayor since 2009.

== Early career ==
Ewing graduated from Omaha Northwest High School, where he was a member of both the football and basketball teams. He attended the University of Nebraska Omaha, receiving his bachelor's degree in business administration and criminal justice, and his master's degree in urban studies. Ewing served for twenty-five years with the Omaha Police Department, retiring as Deputy Chief of Police in 2006.

In 2006, Ewing announced that he would challenge Douglas County Treasurer Julie Haney, a Republican, for re-election, citing his experience in managing the police department's finances. Ewing won the Democratic nomination unopposed, and advanced to the general election against Haney. Ewing criticized Haney for her conduct in office, citing the embezzlement conviction of one of the office's senior managers. Ewing ultimately defeated Haney in a landslide, winning 58 percent of the vote to her 42 percent. With his victory, Ewing became the first African-American to win a county-wide election in state history.

Ewing was re-elected unopposed in 2010.

In 2014, Ewing ran for re-election to a third term, and was challenged by Republican Wayne Hohndorf. He defeated Hohndorf by a wide margin, receiving 60 percent of the vote to Hohndorf's 39 percent. He was re-elected to a fourth term unopposed in 2018 and 2022.

== 2012 congressional campaign ==
Ewing announced in 2011 that he would challenge Republican Congressman Lee Terry for re-election in 2012. He won the Democratic primary against State Senator Gwen Howard by a wide margin, and advanced to the general election against Terry.

During the campaign, Terry significantly outraised and outspent Ewing's campaign, and Ewing received little support from national Democratic Party groups. However, President Barack Obama's re-election campaign invested in winning the electoral college vote of the 2nd district, which helped Ewing's campaign Ultimately, Terry narrowly defeated Ewing to win re-election, winning 51 percent of the vote to Ewing's 49 percent.

== Mayor of Omaha ==
In 2025, Ewing challenged Omaha Mayor Jean Stothert for re-election. Ewing placed second in the nonpartisan primary, winning 33 percent of the vote to Stothert's 36 percent, while former State Senator Mike McDonnell placed third with 20 percent.

In the general election, Stothert, a Republican, ran a controversial television advertisement accusing Ewing of "stand[ing] with radicals" and supporting "boys in girls' bathrooms and sports," while a political action committee supporting Stothert sent mailers alleging that Ewing wanted to "transition minors without their parents' consent." Ewing's campaign condemned the advertisements, and the Nebraska Democratic Party attacked Stothert's "focus on potties, while John [Ewing] focuses on fixing potholes."

Ewing ultimately defeated Stothert by a wide margin, receiving 57% of the vote to her 43%, becoming the city's first Democratic mayor to be elected since 2009, and the city's first African American mayor.

On April 20, 2026, Ewing spoke at an event hosted by the Heartland Bike Share, which provides electric bikes throughout the Omaha-Metro. At the event it was announced that the Heartland Bike Share would provide an unlimited amount of free bike rides up to an hour long to residents of the Omaha-Metro throughout the duration of 2026. Ewing referred to it as an "important step forward in transit" for Omaha.

== Personal life ==
Ewing and his wife Viv have two daughters.

Political offices
Preceded by Jean Stothert	Mayor of Omaha; 2025–present	Incumbent
