= 2011 Omaha mayoral recall election =

- January 25, 2011
- Shall Jim Suttle be removed from the office of Omaha Mayor?

Results
Choice	Votes	%
Yes	39,781	48.59%
No	42,091	51.41%
Mayor before election
Jim Suttle
Democratic
Mayor
Jim Suttle
Democratic

The 2011 Omaha mayoral recall election was an unsuccessful special recall election to remove Omaha Mayor Jim Suttle from office. It was held on January 25, 2011. The recall effort was rejected with 51% of the vote.

== Background ==
Jim Suttle was elected Mayor of Omaha in 2009 over former Mayor Hal Daub with 50.5% of the vote. On September 22, 2010, the Mayor Suttle Recall Committee announced that it would seek to recall Suttle, citing his decision to increase taxes during a recession rather than cutting spending, and how he negotiated a police union contract. The local Democratic Party supported Suttle, arguing that the recall "mocks and undermines what the recall process is truly for and attempts to negate the voices of those who voted fairly in the 2009 municipal elections." At the filing deadline, the committee submitted more than 37,000 recall petitions, exceeding the 26,643 required to call the recall election. On December 4, 2010, the Douglas County Election Commissioner announced that the committee had submitted 28,720 valid signatures. The City Council subsequently scheduled the recall election for January 25, 2011. Suttle's campaign challenged the legality of the recall effort, arguing that fraud occurred in petition-gathering, but that challenge was rejected by a state court judge, who found that the campaign had not submitted sufficient evidence that fraud altered the outcome.

As Suttle organized a campaign to defend himself, he argued that his decisions were necessary to manage the city's precarious financial situation: "My legacy is Jim Suttle brought financial stability to Omaha," he argued. In early January 2011, Suttle pointed to the city's $3 million budget surplus, a reversal of the $12 million deficit that it faced in January 2010.

Ultimately, Suttle narrowly prevailed in the recall, with "No" winning 51% of the vote and defeating "Yes" by 2,310 votes.

== Results ==
2011 Omaha mayoral recall election
Choice	Votes	%
For	39,781	48.59
Against	42,091	51.41
Total	81,872	100.00
Source: Douglas County Election Commission
