= Senator Bourne =

Senator Bourne may refer to:

- Jonathan Bourne Jr. (politician) (1855–1940), U.S. Senator from Oregon from 1907 to 1913
- Patrick Bourne (born 1964), Nebraska State Senate
- Vicki Bourne (born 1954), Australian Senator from New South Wales from 1990 to 2002

== See also ==
- Augustus O. Bourn (1834–1925), Rhode Island State Senate
