= Heath Mello =

American politician (born 1979)

Member of the Nebraska Legislature from the 5th district
- In office January 7, 2009 – January 4, 2017
- Preceded by: Don Preister
- Succeeded by: Mike McDonnell

Personal details
- Born: Heath Michael Mello; August 2, 1979 (age 46) Omaha, Nebraska, U.S.
- Party: Democratic
- Spouse: Catherine Mello
- Children: 2

Heath Mello (born August 2, 1979) is an American politician who is a former member of the unicameral Nebraska Legislature. Mello ran for mayor of Omaha, Nebraska, but was defeated by incumbent Jean Stothert in the 2017 mayoral election, receiving 46.56% of the vote. The Greater Omaha Chamber of Commerce named Mello their CEO in 2023.

== Biography ==
He was born in Nebraska, graduated from Gretna High School and resides in Omaha, Nebraska. Mello received his Bachelor of Arts in Political Science from the University of Nebraska–Lincoln in 2002. He currently works as a Community Affairs and Development Specialist at Metropolitan Community College in Omaha, NE. He is a member of the Association of Fundraising Professionals.

Prior to his election to the Nebraska Legislature, Mello worked as a senior aide to U.S. Senator Ben Nelson and as an Assistant Coordinator to the Nebraska Community Improvement Program.

=== State legislature ===
Mello was a Nebraska state senator who was elected to represent the 5th Legislative District in the Nebraska Legislature on November 4, 2008. Legislative District 5 consists of the South Omaha and North Bellevue portions of the Omaha Metropolitan area. Mello was re-elected November 6, 2012. He was opposed by NARAL Pro-Choice America due to earlier introduction of anti-abortion legislation, and support of legislation introduced by others. Pro-choice advocates also assailed Senator Bernie Sanders and Democratic Party Chairman Tom Perez for their support of Mello. The Huffington Post reported that Mello sponsored the final version of a 20-week abortion ban approved by the governor in 2010. He also cast anti-abortion votes, including supporting a requirement for physicians to be physically present during an abortion, which limited access to telemedicine abortion care. Additionally, he supported a law banning insurance plans in the state from covering abortions. He was endorsed in 2010 by anti-abortion group Nebraska Right to Life.

==== Legislative committees and organizations ====
Mello was elected to the Legislature in 2008 and reelected in 2012. In his final term in the legislature, Mello served as chairman of the Appropriations Committee and on the Nebraska Retirement Systems Committee in the Nebraska Legislature, as well as the Legislature's State Planning Committee, Homeland Security Policy Group and the Healthcare Reform Task Force. Mello was appointed as chief lobbyist for the University of Nebraska system in December 2017.

Mello is an active member in national state legislative organizations; serving on the Economic Development and Energy Committees within the Midwestern Legislative Conference of the Council of State Governments, as well as, the Budgets & Revenue and Labor & Economic Development Committees within the National Conference of State Legislators. Mello is also a member of CLEAN (Coalition of Legislators for Energy Action Now), the National Caucus of Environmental Legislators and the Specialty Equipment Market Association State Automotive Enthusiast Leadership Caucus.

On July 11, 2023, Greater Omaha Chamber announce Heath Mello as organization's new CEO after in past CEO resign.

== Personal life ==
=== Community organizations ===
As of March 10, 2010 Mello served on the Board of Directors for One World Health Center, Bellevue Community Police Foundation, South Omaha Business Association, the South Omaha Neighborhood Alliance and the Q Street Merchants Association. He also served as a member of South Omaha Optimists, South Omaha Development Project, South Omaha Environmental Task Force, South Omaha Weed & Seed, Bellevue Chamber of Commerce, Sarpy County Chamber of Commerce, and Omaha Chamber of Commerce.

=== Religion ===
Mello, a Catholic, is a member of St. Thomas More Parish in Omaha, and a member of the Knights of Columbus. Mello and his wife, Catherine, were married on May 22, 2010.

== See also ==
- Nebraska Legislature

Preceded by Don Preister	Nebraska Legislature District 5; 2009–2017	Succeeded by Mike McDonnell
