= Tom White (Nebraska politician) =

American politician (born 1956)

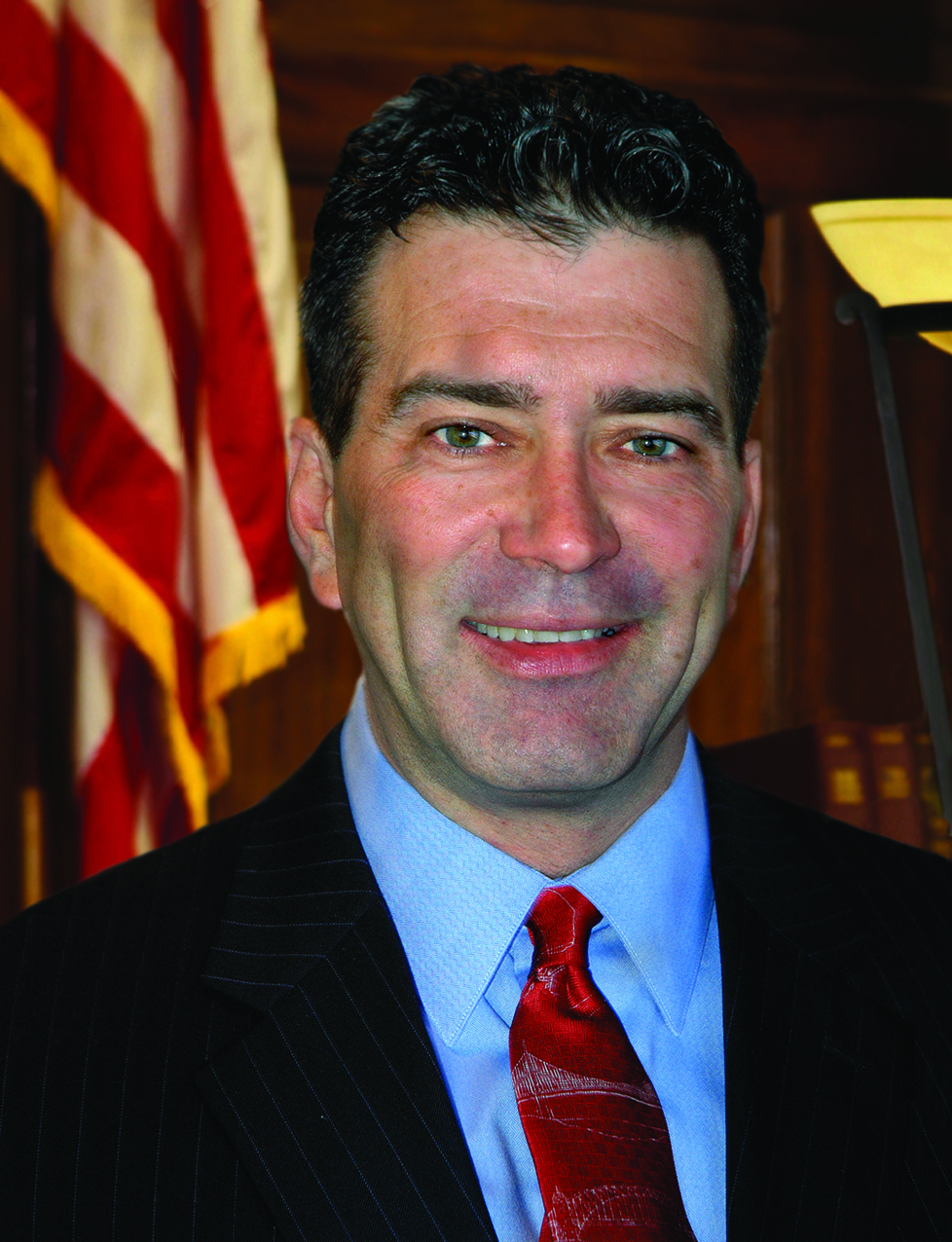

Member of the Nebraska Legislature from the 8th district
- In office 2007–2010
- Preceded by: Patrick Bourne
- Succeeded by: Burke Harr

Personal details
- Born: October 26, 1956 (age 69) Columbus, Nebraska, U.S.
- Party: Democratic
- Spouse: Barb White
- Children: Logan; Reilly
- Education: Regis University, Creighton University
- Website: Tom White for Congress 2010

Tom White (born October 26, 1956) is a former member of the unicameral Nebraska Legislature from Omaha, Nebraska. He represented the 8th District, which consists of the Benson and Dundee neighborhoods in Omaha.

Born in Columbus, Nebraska, he received his B.A. in philosophy and history from Regis University in 1979. He graduated from Creighton University School of Law in 1983.

He was elected to the Legislature in 2006. He served on the Business and Labor, Revenue, and Urban Affairs Committees, as well as the Committee on Committees and Executive Board. He also served as the Vice Chair of the Retirement Systems Committee from 2007 to 2008.

Since his election to the Nebraska Legislature, White has been mentioned as a possible Democratic candidate for Governor or Congress. In early July 2009, he formally announced he was raising money and laying groundwork for a run for Congress from the Omaha-area Second Congressional District. He officially launched his campaign on September 9, 2009, positioning himself as a "tax-fighting, pro-business Democrat who loves the word 'nonpartisan.'"

== Legislative record ==
=== Property Tax Relief ===
White has introduced multiple proposals to reform Nebraska's property tax system to help homeowners. In 2007, he introduced a bill to reduce every homeowner's property taxes by $500 annually by means of an income tax credit.

In 2009, he introduced a proposal that would have modified the property tax credit program created by the 2007 tax cut package (which White supported) and given all property tax relief to homeowners through an across-the-board homestead exemption. At the time, he cited concerns that the current program helped large out-of-state landowners and big corporations rather than average homeowners. White even set up a website to give homeowners the chance to compare the tax relief they were currently receiving with his proposal.

=== Omaha Sewer Separation Sales Tax Relief ===
During the 2010 session of the Nebraska Legislature, White led a bipartisan group of senators that worked to repeal the sales tax on the unfunded federal sewer mandate and infrastructure replacement project in the metro Omaha area. The bill would have eliminated a $325 million tax hike on people in metropolitan Omaha.

White's efforts to pass the bill were opposed by Jim Suttle, the mayor of Omaha. Suttle even hired a lobbyist at taxpayer expense to oppose the tax cut, drawing criticism from some in Omaha city government.

The bill was advanced from committee and passed one round of voting by the full Legislature before being blocked by a filibuster.

=== Governmental Transparency and Efficiency ===
White's Taxpayer Transparency Act, passed in 2009, requires development of a publicly accessible, nonpolitical website to track all state spending.

During the 2010 session, White sponsored a bill to cut state government red tape for small businesses. The Regulatory Flexibility Act was advanced from committee but stalled out on the legislative floor on a near party-line vote.

=== Budget and Taxes ===
During his time in the Legislature, White has only supported balanced budgets that contain no tax increases. He did not vote for the state budgets in 2007 and 2008 because they contained increases in the gas tax. He voted for the budget in 2009 and for the 2010 budget, which cut millions in state spending and was balanced without raising taxes.

During the budget-cutting special session in 2009, White voted for the three bills that cut and balanced the budget. The bills closely mirrored Governor Heineman's proposal, which was based on agency savings, general fund transfers, specific reductions and across-the-board reductions that could lead to furloughs or layoffs. White did not, however, vote for a separate proposal to reduce future aid to public schools because, he argued, it would lead to local property tax increases. This argument was later echoed by Governor Heineman.

Instead, he introduced an alternative plan that would have balanced the budget, closed property tax loopholes for large landowners – many of them from out-of-state – and increased property tax relief for homeowners. Attorney General Jon Bruning ruled the bill outside the narrow scope of the Governor's special session call, so it was not debated.

White opposed line-item vetoes by Governor Heineman in 2007 that cut funding for Meals on Wheels in Omaha and programs for the disabled. The budget was already balanced prior to the vetoes, so the Governor's reduction was not necessary. During debate, White said Appropriations Committee members had come to the chamber and said about the budget: "This is lean, this is mean, this is responsible. And now we're whacking it out... Budgets are moral documents, and we are kicking to the curb those that Christ pulled to him."

As a member of the Revenue Committee, White worked to eliminate the marriage penalty in the state's income tax code and increase tax incentives for research and development.

White has tried unsuccessfully to lower the sales tax, noting that a lower sales tax benefits everyone, especially the poor. "What's driving me is trying to make sure there is representation for the poor," White said. He also cited similar reasoning when he pushed to lower the gas tax, saying that order to pay for food, people in this state have to drive a vehicle and it's difficult to rely on public transportation. A rise in the gas tax comes at a time when citizens are crying out that they are already overburdened, he said: "For us to pile on … seems to me to be inappropriate. Now is a particularly bad time, almost a cruel time, to raise taxes."

=== School Funding ===
An outspoken advocate for metro-area schools, White helped filibuster a state aid reduction bill that would have disproportionately impacted his constituents. White told senators during debate that they shouldn't stop at least trying to close the gap in funding between minority children and white children. "If you (stop trying), we're going to get into a lawsuit and it is going to cost us far more than sitting and making a compromise right now," he said.

White, a native of Columbus, Nebraska, introduced an innovative bill to deal with the challenges of education funding in small-town Nebraska. His proposal, the Business Partnership in Rural Education Program, would have allow companies that have earned business tax credits to use some of those credits to help local school systems. The companies would be able to contribute up to $10 million in tax credits to local school districts over a four-year period, and would have to provide a 75 percent match under the bill. The bill did not advance from committee.

=== Illegal Immigration ===
White has advocated measures to reduce illegal immigration by targeting employers who profit from illegal labor.

=== Other Legislative Accomplishments ===
White has also been an advocate for the families of military personnel, introducing and passing the Military Family Leave Act in 2007.

A bill introduced by White in 2008 and passed that same year created a grant program for electric companies that helps low-income homeowners make their homes more energy-efficient.

White worked with Republican Attorney General Jon Bruning to pass legislation cracking down on internet sex predators in 2009.

Also in 2009, White's Legislative Bill 551 provided increased access to affordable healthcare for young people in their 20s.

In 2010, the Legislature passed White's Construction Prompt Pay Act (LB 552) which ensures that contractors, subcontractors, and workers receive payment in a timely manner. Under the bill, owners must pay contractors within 30 days and contractors and subcontractors must pay within 10 days. The bill was aimed at large out-of-state contractors who use Nebraska craftsmen as a bank, putting off paying them well beyond the normal 30-day tradition. A diverse coalition of business and labor groups supported the bill, including the Associated General Contractors-Nebraska Building Chapter, the Omaha Building Trades, and the International Brotherhood of Electrical Workers.

== Personal life ==
White is a lifelong Nebraskan. He and his wife Barb have lived in the same part of Omaha since purchasing their first home over twenty years ago. Tom and Barb have two adult children: a son, Logan, and a daughter, Reilly.

Working his way through school by doing construction and warehouse work, White graduated from Regis University in 1979 and Creighton University School of Law in 1983. Currently a partner with the Omaha law firm Tom White Law, his legal career has focused on representing working people in issues such as workplace discrimination and civil rights. The firm also does commercial contract work.

White has voiced to the press his pro-life stance (which he partially attributes to his Irish Catholic heritage), as well as his belief in fiscal conservatism and limited government.

Preceded by Patrick Bourne	Nebraska state senator- district 8; 2007–2010	Succeeded by Burke Harr
