= 2013 Omaha mayoral election =

- May 14, 2013
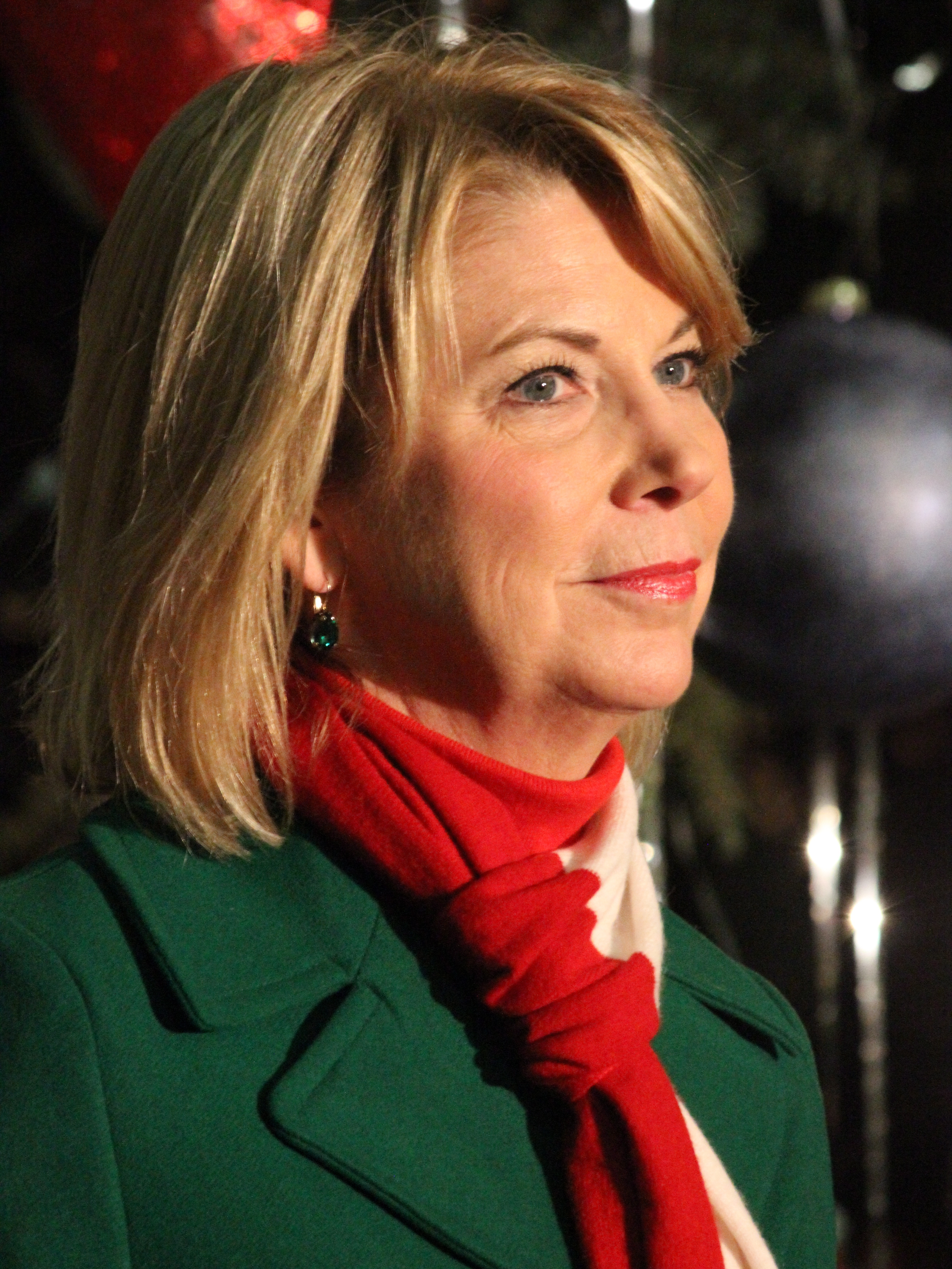

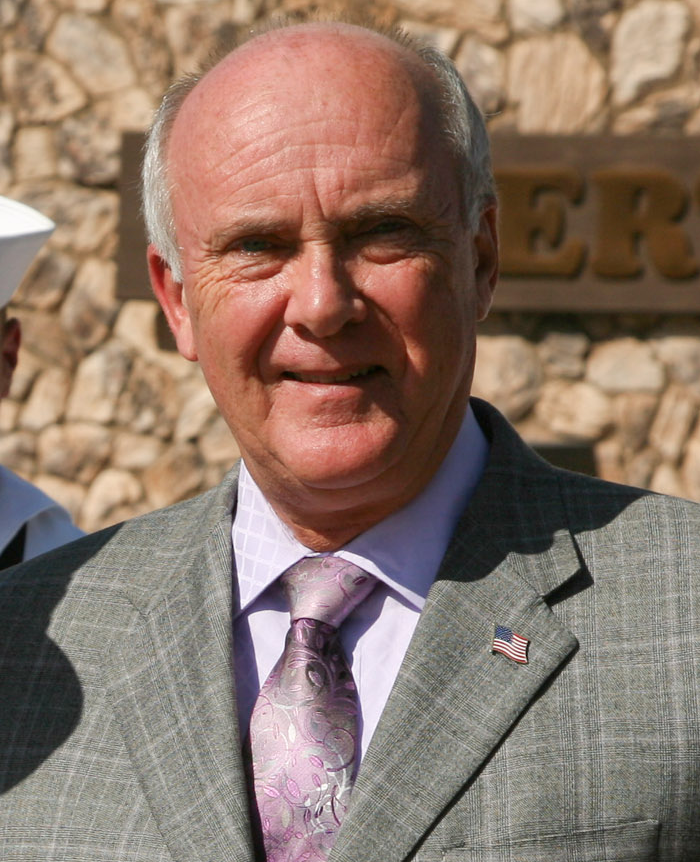
Nominee	Jean Stothert	Jim Suttle
Popular vote	48,290	36,120
Percentage	56.97%	42.61%
Results by city council district:
Stothert:
50–60%
60–70%
70–80%
Suttle:
50–60%
70–80%
Mayor before election
Jim Suttle
Democratic
Elected mayor
Jean Stothert
Republican

The 2013 Omaha mayoral election took place on May 14, 2013. Incumbent Mayor Jim Suttle sought a second term in office.

The position of mayor in Omaha is officially a non-partisan position. A blanket primary was held on April 2, 2013. The top two finishers in the primary, Suttle and City Councilwoman Jean Stothert, moved on to the general election. In the general election, Stothert defeated Suttle and became Omaha's first female mayor.

== Primary election ==
=== Candidates ===
- Jean Stothert, City Councilwoman
- Jim Suttle, incumbent Mayor
- Dave Nabity, businessman
- Brad Ashford, State Senator
- Dan Welch, former City Councilman
- Mort Sullivan, perennial candidate
- Maura DeLuca, factory worker and 2012 vice presidential nominee of the Socialist Workers Party

=== Results ===
2013 Omaha mayoral primary election
Party	Candidate	Votes	%
Nonpartisan	Jean Stothert	19,205	32.12%
Nonpartisan	Jim Suttle (inc.)	14,634	24.47%
Nonpartisan	Dave Nabity	10,430	17.44%
Nonpartisan	Brad Ashford	7,906	13.22%
Nonpartisan	Dan Welch	7,209	12.06%
Nonpartisan	Mort Sullivan	162	0.27%
Nonpartisan	Maura DeLuca	201	0.34%
Write-in		52	0.09%
Total votes		59,859	100.00%

== General election ==
=== Results ===
2013 Omaha mayoral general election results
Party	Candidate	Votes	%
Nonpartisan	Jean Stothert	48,290	56.97%
Nonpartisan	Jim Suttle (inc.)	36,120	42.61%
Write-in		361	0.43%
Total votes		84,771	100.00%
