= 2017 Omaha mayoral election =

- May 9, 2017
- Turnout: 30.9%
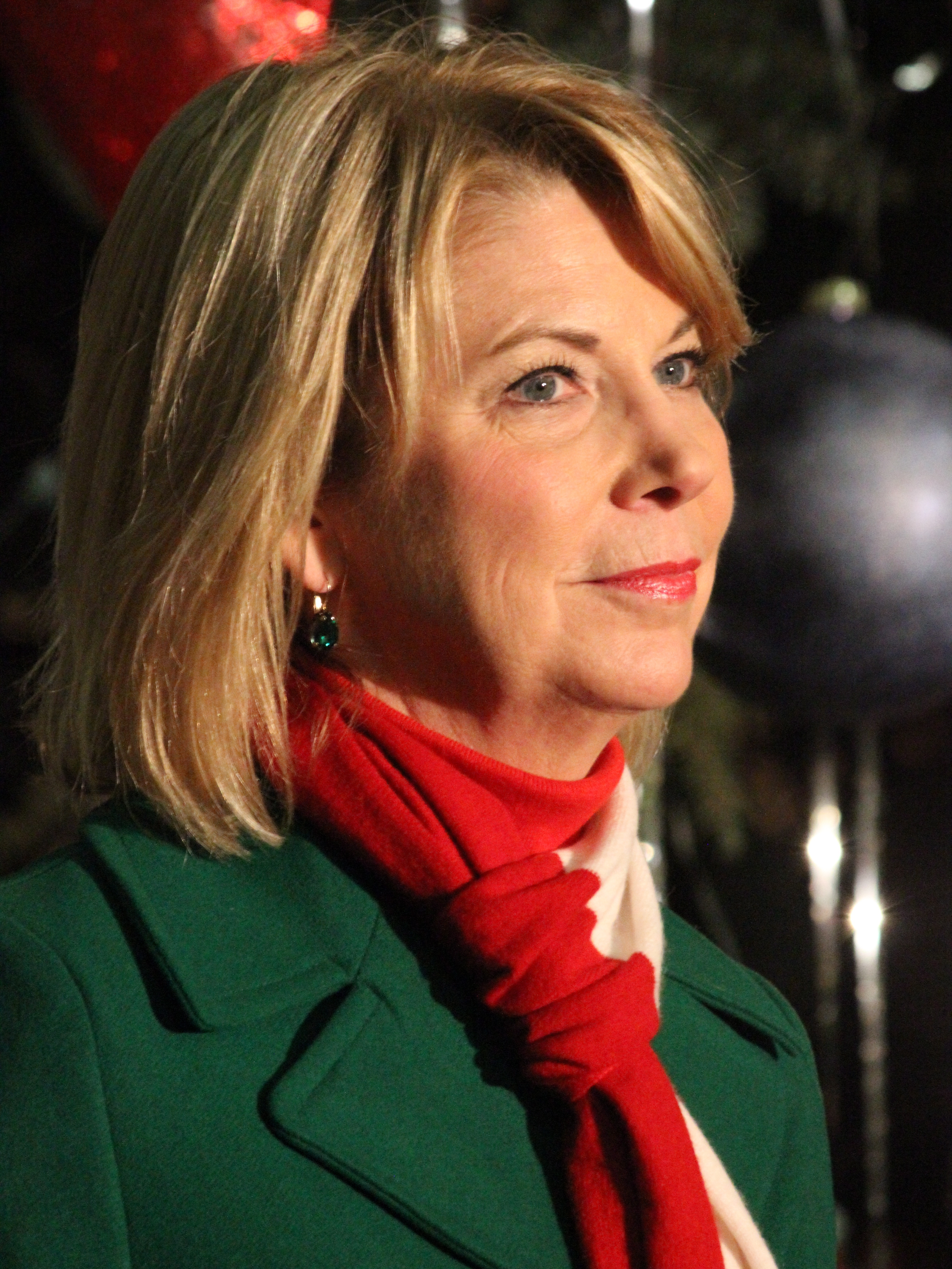

Candidate	Jean Stothert	Heath Mello
Popular vote	52,509	46,761
Percentage	52.78%	47.01%

Results by precinct:
Stothert:
40–50%
50–60%
60–70%
70–80%
Mello:
30–40%
40–50%
50–60%
60–70%
70–80%
Tie:
30–40%
No votes
Mayor before election
Jean Stothert
Republican
Elected mayor
Jean Stothert
Republican

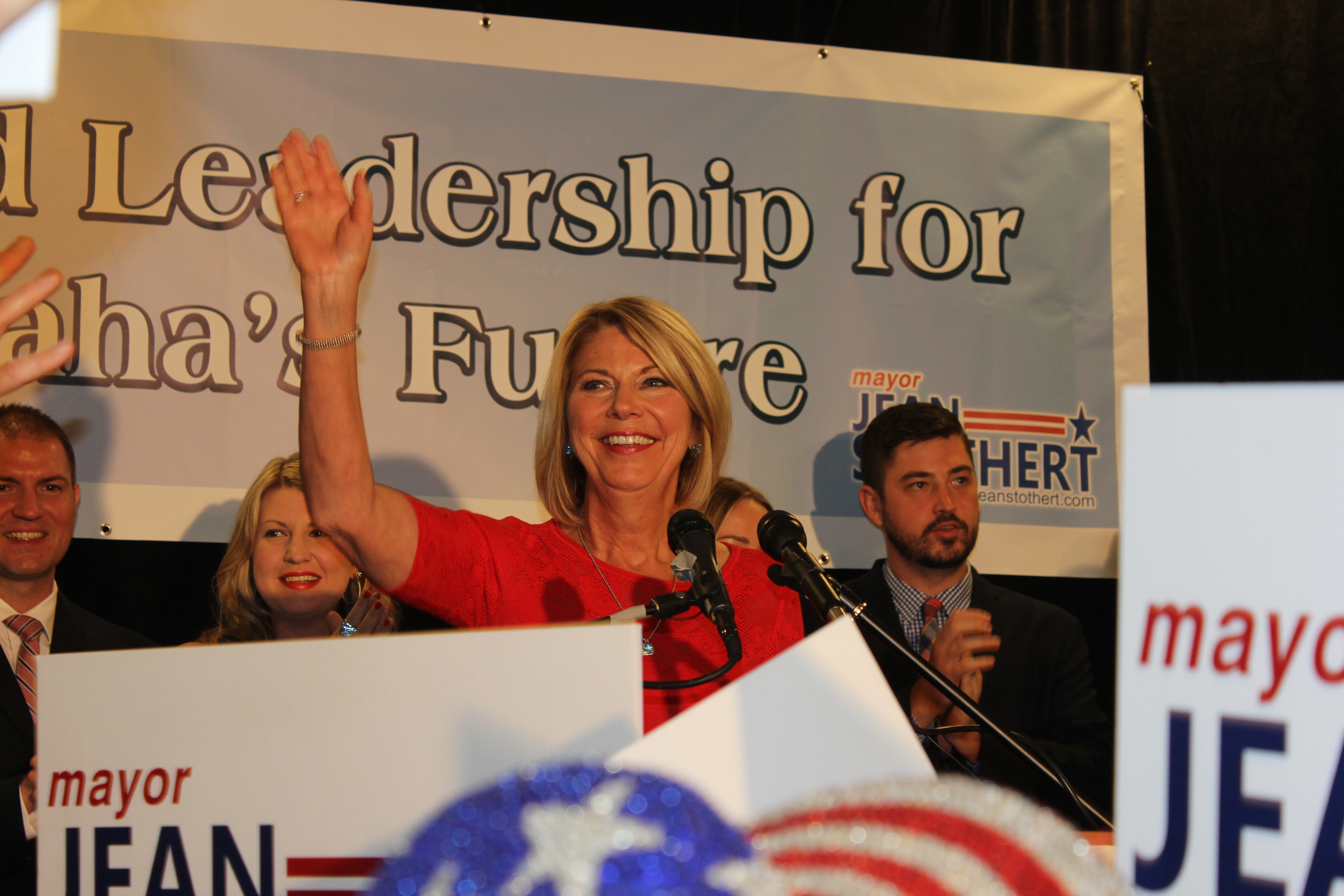
Stothert celebrating her victory

The 2017 Omaha mayoral election was held on May 9, 2017. Incumbent Mayor Jean Stothert won re-election to a second term in office.

The position of mayor in Omaha is officially a non-partisan position. A blanket primary was held on April 4, 2017. The top two finishers in the primary, Jean Stothert and Heath Mello, moved on to the general election.

Alongside the mayor, the Omaha City Council was up for re-election. It is also officially non-partisan. However, it remained controlled by a Democratic majority, as only district 7 has a general election between a Democrat and a Republican. Districts 1, 2, 3, 4 remained Democratic whereas districts 5 and 6 remained Republican. The incumbent Republican in district 7 was re-elected as well.

== Anti-abortion Democratic Criticism ==
Mello was opposed by NARAL Pro-Choice America due to earlier introduction of anti-abortion legislation, and support of legislation introduced by others. Pro-choice advocates also assailed Senator Bernie Sanders and Democratic Party Chairman Tom Perez for their support of Mello. The Huffington Post reported that Mello sponsored the final version of a 20-week abortion ban approved by the governor in 2010. He also cast anti-abortion votes, including supporting a requirement for physicians to be physically present during an abortion, which limited access to telemedicine abortion care. Additionally, he supported a law banning insurance plans in the state from covering abortions. He was endorsed in 2010 by anti-abortion group Nebraska Right to Life.

== Primary election ==
=== Candidates ===
- Jean Stothert, incumbent Mayor
- Heath Mello, former State Senator
- Taylor Royal
- Christopher N. Geary
- Ean Mikale

2017 Omaha mayoral primary election results
Party	Candidate	Votes	%
Nonpartisan	Jean Stothert	25,501	43.71%
Nonpartisan	Heath Mello	24,155	41.40%
Nonpartisan	Taylor Royal	6,289	10.78%
Nonpartisan	Ean Mikale	1,781	3.05%
Nonpartisan	Christopher N. Geary	547	0.94%
Write-in		67	0.11%
Total votes		58,340	100.00%

== General election ==
=== Fundraising ===
Campaign finance reports as of April 24, 2017
Candidate (party)	Total receipts	Total disbursements	Cash on hand
Jean Stothert (R)	$499,659	$1,535,900	$241,352
Health Mello (D)	$899,213	$1,131,433	$240,898
Source: Nebraska Accountability and Disclosure Commission

=== Results ===
2017 Omaha mayoral general election results
Party	Candidate	Votes	%
Nonpartisan	Jean Stothert (inc.)	52,509	52.78%
Nonpartisan	Heath Mello	46,761	47.01%
Write-in		209	0.21%
Total votes		99,479	100.00%

==== Results by city council district ====
Results by City Council district
District	Jean Stothert Republican		Heath Mello Democratic		Total
District	#	%	#	%	Total
1	7,386	46.86%	8,375	53.13%	15,751
2	2,388	28.59%	4,433	71.40%	8,352
3	5,209	38.63%	8,275	61.36%	13,484
4	4,122	49.17%	4,261	50.82%	8,383
5	10,312	65.23%	5,495	34.76%	15,807
6	12,609	65.31%	6,696	34.68%	19,305
7	9,387	61.36%	5,911	38.63%	15,298
