= Bernice Labedz =

American politician (1919–2008)

Bernice R. Labedz

Member of the Nebraska Legislature from the 5th district
- In office July 1976 – January 1993
- Preceded by: Eugene T. Mahoney
- Succeeded by: Don Preister

Chair of the Executive Board of the Nebraska Legislature
- In office 1987–1991
- Preceded by: Chris Beutler
- Succeeded by: Jerome Warner

Personal details
- Born: September 19, 1919 Omaha, Nebraska, US
- Died: November 15, 2008 (aged 89) Papillion, Nebraska, US
- Party: Democratic
- Spouse: Stanley J. Labedz
- Children: 4

Bernice R. Labedz (born Bernice R. Koziol; Sept. 19, 1919 – Nov. 15, 2008) was a member of the Nebraska Legislature from 1976 to 1993 from District 5 in Omaha, Nebraska. Appointed by Nebraska Governor J. James Exon on July 22, 1976, to fill the unexpired term of Eugene T. Mahoney, she was reelected in 1976, 1980, 1984, and 1988. She was a member of the Democratic Party.

Labedz was born in Omaha, Nebraska, on September 19, 1919, one of 17 children. She attended St. Francis Catholic School in Omaha and was a graduate of Omaha South High School.

On May 9, 1942, she married Stanley J. Labedz, who worked for the Omaha Police Department. She was very active in her community and served on a number of committees and boards of community organizations such as Meyer Children's Rehabilitation Institute, United Catholic Social Services, and South Omaha Christians for Life. Labedz also served as a businesswoman and in other government positions. She served six years at the Nebraska Department of Revenue and four years as secretary to Omaha Mayor Ed Zorinsky and as his administrative aide when he became a US Senator. She also served 18 months as the office manager for J. James Exon.

As a member of the legislature, Labedz served on the General Affairs, Judiciary, Appropriations, Natural Resources, and Urban Affairs committees. She was also the chair of the executive board of the Legislature.
