= 2001 Omaha mayoral election =

- May 15, 2001
- Turnout: 45.11%
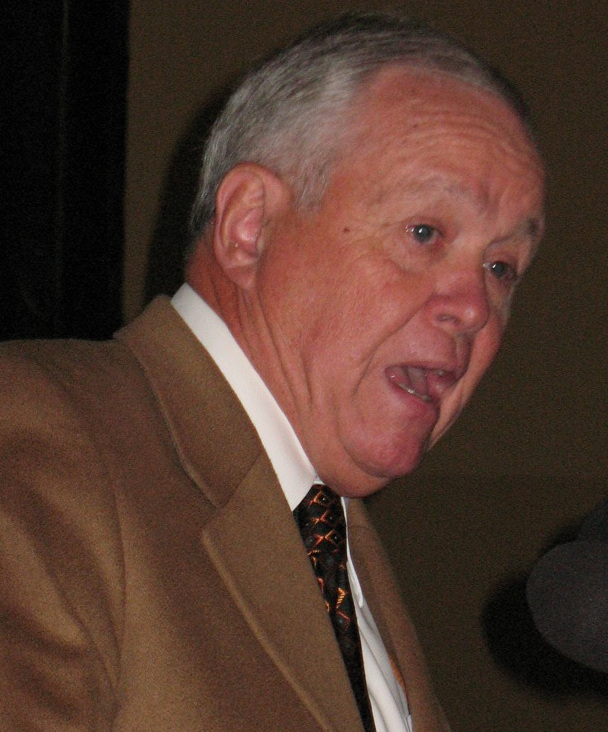

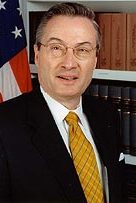
| Nominee | Mike Fahey | Hal Daub |
| Popular vote | 53,778 | 52,704 |
| Percentage | 50.57% | 48.98% |
Mayor before election
Hal Daub
Republican
Elected mayor
Mike Fahey
Democratic

The 2001 Omaha mayoral election was held on May 15, 2001. Incumbent Mayor Hal Daub ran for re-election and was narrowly defeated by Mike Fahey.

== Primary election ==
=== Candidates ===
- Mike Fahey, former Omaha Planning Board member
- Hal Daub, incumbent Mayor

=== Results ===
2001 Omaha mayoral primary election results
| Party | Candidate | Votes | % |
|---|---|---|---|
| Nonpartisan | Mike Fahey | 30,205 | 50.57% |
| Nonpartisan | Hal Daub (inc.) | 29,228 | 48.98% |
| Write-in | | 300 | 0.50% |
| Total votes | | 59,733 | 100.00% |

== General election ==
=== Results ===
2001 Omaha mayoral general election results
| Party | Candidate | Votes | % |
|---|---|---|---|
| Nonpartisan | Mike Fahey | 53,778 | 50.49% |
| Nonpartisan | Hal Daub (inc.) | 52,704 | 49.49% |
| Write-in | | 229 | 0.22% |
| Total votes | | 106,711 | 100.00% |
