= Daniel J. Gross Catholic High School =

- Gross Catholic

Location
- 7700 South 43rd Street; Bellevue, (Sarpy County), Nebraska 68147; United States; 41°10′58″N 95°58′47″W

Information
- Type: Private, coeducational
- Motto: "Dux Esto" (Be a Leader)
- Religious affiliation: Roman Catholic
- Established: 1968
- Grades: 9–12
- Houses: Willett; Barrett; McMenamy; Middleton
- Colors: Burnt orange and royal blue
- Team name: Cougars
- Accreditation: Cognia (education)
- Website: www.grosscatholic.org

Daniel J. Gross Catholic High School is a secondary school owned by the Archdiocese of Omaha and sponsored by the Marianists. It is located in north Bellevue, Nebraska, United States, 6 blocks south of Harrison Street. The entrance to the school is at 44th and Margo Street. The school's athletic teams are the Cougars; its colors are burnt orange and royal blue.

== School History ==
The Archdiocese of Omaha built a new high school to provide Catholic education in Sarpy County and south Omaha. Louise Gross donated a lump sum of money to the construction of the high school and wished to honor her late husband, Daniel Gross; accordingly, the newly constructed high school was named Daniel J. Gross Catholic High School.

Archbishop Gerald Bergan invited the priests and brothers from the Society of Mary and the Franciscan Sisters of Our Lady of Perpetual Help to help create the Gross Catholic community. Bro. Leo Willett, S.M., the first principal, opened the school on September 3, 1968, with a freshman class of 175 students. The Class of 1972 became the first graduating class on May 28, 1972. Today, Gross Catholic has over 8200 alumni.

== Crest ==
The crest is divided by a cross. The upper left quarter bears an "A" superimposed on an "M". This symbol of the Blessed Virgin Mary represents the Marian consecration of the two religious orders that founded the school, the Marianists and the Franciscan Sisters of Our Lady of Perpetual Help. The Franciscan cord appears in this quarter. In the upper right quarter are the scales, the symbol of the law profession which was the career of Daniel J. Gross (1897–1958), a prominent Omaha attorney in whose memory the school was named. The lower right quarter is a torch representative of the school's seeking achievement and excellence in academics and activities. It is surmounted by a banner inscribed with the school's founding date, 1968. The lower right quarter bears a part of the coat of arms of Archbishop Gerald T. Bergan, under whose inspiration and leadership the school was conceived.

On the ribbon at the bottom is inscribed the motto "Dux esto", which translates as "Be a leader." At the top are three chain links representing the archdiocesan officials, parish priests and elementary school teachers; the benefactors, parents, and friends of the school; the faculty and staff. All these are fastened by a circle representing the students, who are the real concern and connecting link of the above individuals and groups.

== House System ==
Gross Catholic's house system was first proposed by a group of juniors during a leadership retreat and was implemented on August 2014 under the direction of then school president Dorothy Ostrowski. The system follows a tradition found at other Marianist schools, in which the student body is divided into smaller multi-grade communities, otherwise known as "houses" to foster leadership and a sense of belonging among students. The four houses are named after Marianist brothers and priests who served at Gross Catholic: Willett House for Brother Leo Willett, the founding principal; Barrett House for Brother Joe Barrett; McMenamy House for Father Al McMenamy; and Middleton House for Brother Rich Middleton. Each year, incoming freshmen are assigned to a house on Sorting Day and remain in that house for all four years. Each house comprises roughly 100 students and includes a faculty Dean and student Co-Captains, otherwise known as "SALT" leaders. Houses compete throughout the school year for the Cougar Cup, which is awarded on Field Day in the spring.

Cougar Cup Champions
Year	Winner
2026	Middleton House
2025	Barrett House
2024	Middleton House
2023	Barrett House
2022	Middleton House
2021	Middleton House
2020	McMenamy House
2019	Barrett House
2018	Willet House
2017	Middleton House
2016	Middleton House
2015	McMenamy House

== Athletics ==
Gross students participate in the following interscholastic sports: in the fall season, boys' tennis, cross country, football, girls' golf, softball, and volleyball; in the winter season, boys' basketball, girls' basketball, swimming, water polo and wrestling; and in the spring season, baseball, boys' golf, boys' soccer, girls' soccer, girls' tennis, track, and trap shooting.

Cougar athletic teams have won a total of 19 state championships:

State championships
Season	Sport	Number of championships	Year(s)
Fall	Football	1	2012
Fall	Volleyball	4	1999, 2005, 2009, 2010
Winter	Girls' basketball	1	1991
Winter	Wrestling	4	1993, 1994, 1995, 1996
Spring	Baseball	6	1971, 1972, 1973, 1974, 2009, 2010
Spring	Boys' golf	2	1997, 2005
Spring	Boys' soccer	1	2000
Total		19	

As of 2012, Omaha Northwest was the only other school in Nebraska that had won four consecutive baseball championships. A total of 31 Cougar wrestlers have won individual state championships. Two individuals have won state cross country championships, one girl and one boy. One individual boy has claimed an individual state championship in the 3200 meter run in track. There has also been a men's state champion 4x800 meter team.

== Notable alumni ==
- Brian Blankenship, NFL offensive lineman for the Pittsburgh Steelers
- Chad Meyers, MLB player for the Chicago Cubs
- Erik Haula, NHL player for the Minnesota Wild and the Vegas Golden Knights.
- Jack Randl, USHL Former captain for the Omaha Lancers and forward for the Omaha Mavericks men's ice hockey.
- Joe Berg, USHL Captain for the Tri-City Storm, Princeton Tigers men's ice hockey player.
- Mike McDonnell, member of the Nebraska Legislature representing the 5th district.
- Dylan Travis, basketball player and 2024 Olympian
