= Greater Omaha Chamber of Commerce =

Chamber of commerce in Omaha, Nebraska

- Founded: 1893
- Type: Nonprofit, 501(c)6
- Purpose: Business federation
- Location: Omaha, Nebraska
- Region served: Omaha – Council Bluffs metropolitan area
- Members: 3,000+
- Key people: Heath Mello (Chairman & CEO)
- Website: www.omahachamber.org

The Greater Omaha Chamber of Commerce is the chamber of commerce in Omaha, Nebraska. It was founded in 1893 as the Commercial Club.

== History ==
When former United States Federal Reserve Chairman Ben Bernanke spoke to the chamber in 2007, his comments were noted for his continued endorsement of globalization.

In January 2014, the chamber made headlines for organizing a charity effort tied to Denver Broncos quarterback Peyton Manning. According to an article by Time, the chamber partnered with several Nebraska-based businesses that agreed to collectively donate $800 every time Manning said "Omaha" during the AFC Championship football game on January 19, 2014, against the New England Patriots. Manning is known for yelling the city's name at the line of scrimmage prior to plays. According to the article, the $24,800 raised will go to Manning's charity the Peyback Foundation.

== See also ==
- History of Omaha
- Historic companies in Omaha, Nebraska
- Economy of Omaha, Nebraska
