= 1997 Omaha mayoral election =

- May 13, 1997
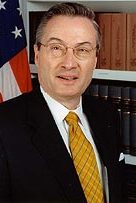

Nominee	Hal Daub	Brenda Council
Popular vote	55,481	54,746
Percentage	50.34%	49.66%
Mayor before election
Hal Daub
Republican
Elected mayor
Hal Daub
Republican

The 1997 Omaha mayoral election was held on May 13, 1997. Incumbent Mayor Hal Daub narrowly defeated City Councilwoman Brenda Council to win re-election.

== Primary election ==
=== Candidates ===
- Hal Daub, incumbent Mayor
- Brenda Council, City Councilwoman
- Lou Lamberty, former Douglas County Commissioner

=== Campaign ===
Daub was first elected in a 1994 special election to succeed Mayor P. J. Morgan, who resigned in 1994, defeating City Councilwoman Brenda Council. Daub ran for a full term in 1997. Lou Lamberty, a former Douglas County Commissioner, announced that he would run against Daub on January 13, 1997, criticizing Daub as a "micromanage[r]" and arguing that the city "need[s] a mayor who will work to unite the community—not divide it." Lamberty initially consolidated the support of the state and local Democratic Party, but Council announced that she would seek a rematch against Daub on February 3, 1997, prompting many Democrats to support her campaign instead.

Crime emerged as an issue in the campaign, heightened by allegations by Lamberty that crime in Omaha was up and that Daub had "refused to release these statistics because it is an election year . . . and these statistics confirm that the crime plan the mayor outlined last week is misguided and two years too late." Daub and Omaha Police Department Chief Jim Skinner argued, in turn, that Lamberty had obtained inaccurate numbers as the result of a glitch in the department's system. Council responded that, during the 1994 election, Daub criticized the department's inaccurate numbers, and that he needed to accept responsibility for the alleged inaccuracy.

Ultimately, though Daub took first place in the nonpartisan primary, Council defeated Lamberty for second place, advancing to the general election against Daub. In conceding defeat, Lamberty endorsed Council, noting, "Brenda and I shared a common goal, and that was to get a new mayor in this city."

=== Results ===
1997 Omaha mayoral primary results
Party	Candidate	Votes	%
Nonpartisan	Hal Daub (inc.)	29,388	40.13%
Nonpartisan	Brenda Council	20,108	27.45%
Nonpartisan	Lou Lamberty	14,879	20.32%
Total votes		73,375	100.00%

== General election ==
=== Campaign ===
The general election campaign between Daub and Council quickly turned negative, with the two campaigns attacking each other over law enforcement and crime. Several weeks after the primary, a letter that Council had sent to the Nebraska Board of Pardons in 1993 asking for clemency for David Rice was sent to media outlets. In the letter, Council argued that Rice, a former member of the Black Panther Party, should be considered for parole. Daub's campaign denied sending the letter to the press. The letter was condemned by Senator Bob Kerrey, former Senator Jim Exon, Governor Ben Nelson, and former Governor Frank B. Morrison, with Morrison arguing that Daub was "conducting his campaign" in a "dangerous" way by "politicizing law enforcement." The controversy over crime statistics continued, with an aide to Daub ultimately resigning after facing allegations from deputy police chiefs that he had published inaccurate crime statistics and ordered the department to withhold financial information from the City Council. The Omaha World-Herald ultimately endorsed Daub for re-election, noting that, setting "aside the soap opera quality of the past few days," it "recommend[ed] his re-election, based on the soundness of his goals, his effectiveness in pursuing them and his vision."

Daub narrowly won re-election over Council, winning by just 735 votes, and including undervotes, fell just shy of an absolute majority of votes cast.

=== Results ===
1997 Omaha mayoral election general election results
Party	Candidate	Votes	%
Nonpartisan	Hal Daub (inc.)	55,481	50.34%
Nonpartisan	Brenda Council	54,746	49.66%
Total votes		110,227	100.00%
