= Chad Meyers =

American baseball player (born 1975)

- Second Baseman / Outfielder
- Born: August 8, 1975 (age 50); Omaha, Nebraska
- Batted: Right Threw: Right

MLB debut
- August 6, 1999, for the Chicago Cubs

Last appearance
- September 28, 2003, for the Seattle Mariners

MLB statistics
- Batting average: .208
- Home runs: 0
- Runs batted in: 9
- Stats at Baseball Reference

Teams
- Chicago Cubs (1999–2001); Seattle Mariners (2003)

Chad William Meyers (born August 8, 1975), is a former infielder and outfielder in Major League Baseball who played for the Chicago Cubs and the Seattle Mariners in parts of four seasons spanning 1999–2003.

Meyers attended Daniel J. Gross Catholic High School in Bellevue, Nebraska. He was an All-State baseball and football player and state wrestling champion. He played college baseball for the Creighton Bluejays. He was a freshman All-American in 1994 and set school records with 51 stolen bases in 1995 and 115 steals in his career.

The Cubs selected Meyers in the fifth round of the 1996 MLB draft. In the minors, he was an All-Star in the Midwest League in 1997, Florida State League in 1998, and Southern League in 1999. He made his MLB debut on August 6, 1999, getting his first MLB hit two days later. He had arthroscopic surgery on his knee after the season. He split the next two seasons between the majors and minors, including driving in the winning run over the Chicago White Sox in June 2000, before the Cubs released him in October 2001. He played in the minors in 2002 before signing with the Mariners in November. He played in nine games in 2003 with Seattle, batting 0-for-1 in his final stint in the majors.

Meyers played parts of the next three seasons in the Mexican Baseball League. He played winter ball for the Leones del Caracas and Caribes de Anzoátegui clubs of the Venezuelan Professional Baseball League.

== Personal life ==
Meyers, his wife, and their three children reside in Papillion, Nebraska.

Meyers was inducted into the Nebraska High School Sports Hall of Fame in 2025.

Meyer's cousin played in the minors from 1986 to 1990.
