= Don Preister =

American politician

Member of the Nebraska Legislature from the 5th district
- In office January 6, 1993 – January 7, 2009
- Preceded by: Bernice Labedz
- Succeeded by: Heath Mello

Personal details
- Born: December 23, 1946 (age 79) Columbus, Nebraska, U.S.
- Party: Democratic

Don Preister (born December 23, 1946) is a Democrat who served 16 years as a Nebraska state senator from Bellevue, Nebraska in the Nebraska Legislature and greeting card manufacturer for Joy Creations. He has served on the Bellevue City Council since 2009 and was the council president for 2013. As a newly appointed City Council member, at the request of Mayor Gary Mixan, he established a green team named Green Bellevue committee to coordinate efforts towards a cleaner, greener, more sustainable community.

== Personal life ==
He was born in Columbus, Nebraska and graduated from South High School in Omaha, Nebraska. He also graduated from University of Nebraska at Omaha in 1977. From 1966 to 1968 he was a U.S. Army medic who was awarded the Bronze Star and other medals during his service in Vietnam. He is a former Boys' Clubs of Omaha, Unit Director, community college instructor and current member of many South Omaha, Bellevue and veterans organizations.

== State legislature ==
He was elected in 1992 to represent the 5th Nebraska legislative district and re-elected in 1996, 2000, and 2004. He served on the Agriculture, General Affairs, Natural Resources, Performance Audit, and Revenue committees and also served as Vice Chairman of the Executive Board, as well as the Committee on Committees .

Preceded by Bernice Labedz	Nebraska state senator-district 5; 1993–2009	Succeeded by Heath Mello

== Green Bellevue ==
Mayor Gary Mixan delivered an Earth Day proclamation proclaiming April 22 Earth Day and Green Bellevue Day in Bellevue, NE in 2010. The then-city of Bellevue volunteer committee, Green Bellevue, became a 501(c)3 non-profit organization in 2010.

Also in 2010, Green Bellevue established a Tree Board for the City of Bellevue and the city qualified to be a Tree City USA by the Arbor Day Foundation in 2012. The city has been recognized by the Arbor Day Foundation for the Grown Award each year since 2017. After years of Green Bellevue's advocation to "lighten the load to the landfill" and increase in recycling in the county, the city of Bellevue transformed their recycling program to make lidded/wheeled containers available, departing from the unlidded, 36 gallon box. With the slogan "yourcartplaysapart.com," residents can now pay for 35, 65 or 95-gallon trash cart at below market prices and receive any size recycling and yard waste composting carts at no charge. Bellevue also became the first city in the United States to pilot and later adopt the Hefty Energy Bag program (now Hefty Renew program) which keeps useful hard-to-recycle plastics out of landfills. In 2021, Preister, with the Green Bellevue board of directors, successfully encouraged the city council to support Bellevue becoming the first Bee City USA certified city in Nebraska by the Xerces Society.

Councilman Preister served as President, with Bellevue resident Ruth Richter serving as Vice President, and Tom Mruz, Treasurer until 2020. Sharon Rea served as President with Michelle Foss as Vice President from January - August 2020. Michelle Foss took over as President with Gillian Cromwell as Vice President until December 2022. Dr. Tyler Moore served as President in 2023, Jeremy Bowers served as Vice President in 2023 and 2024. Ruth Richter was elected President in 2024. Leah Wright was elected as Vice President in 2025. Jennifer Hulscher has been the elected Treasurer since 2020.

Councilman Preister currently services as advisor to the Green Bellevue board of directors and as a co-chair of the Bellevue Bee City USA committee for city liaison. Green Bellevue's URL is www.greenbellevue.org.

== See also ==
- Nebraska Legislature
