= Jean Stothert =

Mayor of Omaha, Nebraska from 2013 to 2025

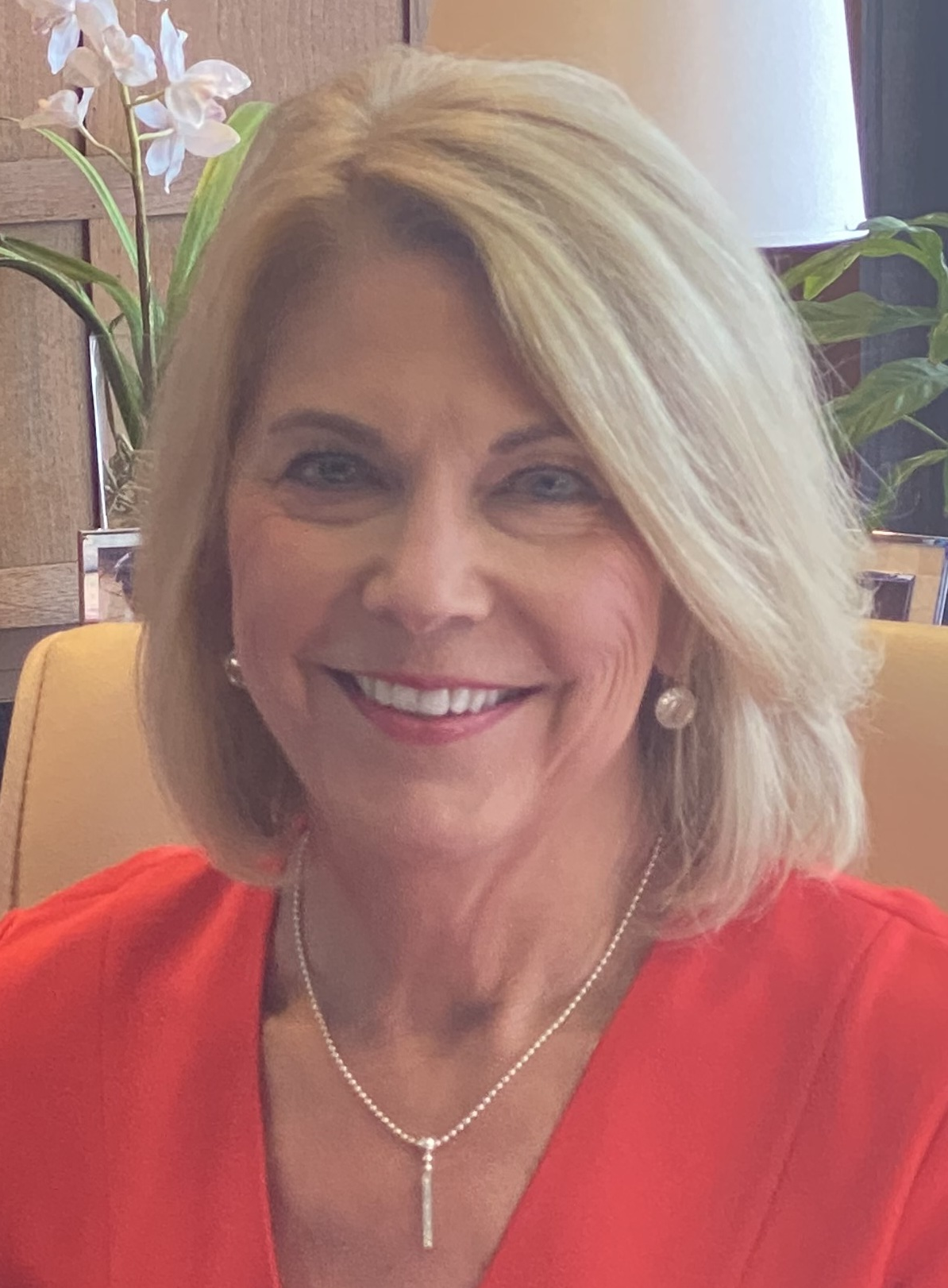
- Stothert in 2020

51st Mayor of Omaha
- In office June 10, 2013 – June 9, 2025
- Preceded by: Jim Suttle
- Succeeded by: John Ewing

Member of the Omaha City Council from the 5th district
- In office 2008–2013
- Preceded by: Dan Welch
- Succeeded by: Rich Pahls

Personal details
- Born: Jean Louise Wolf; February 7, 1954 (age 72) Wood River, Illinois, U.S.
- Party: Republican
- Spouse(s): Joe Stothert (m. 1981; died 2021) Kevin O'Rourke (m. 2022)
- Children: 2
- Education: Seattle Pacific University (BS)

Jean Louise Stothert (née Wolf; born February 7, 1954) is an American politician and former nurse who served as the 51st mayor of Omaha, Nebraska from 2013 to 2025. She was first elected in 2013, becoming the first woman to hold the office. She was reelected in 2017 and 2021, but lost reelection in 2025 to Democrat John Ewing.

== Early life and career ==
Jean Stothert was born on February 7, 1954, in Wood River, Illinois. She earned a Bachelor of Science in nursing from Seattle Pacific University.

Stothert began her career in nursing. Her 12 years as a critical care nurse and nursing manager included serving as head nurse at St. Louis University in Missouri. She was responsible for her department budgeting, hiring and staff management.

== Political career ==
In 1997, Stothert was elected to the Millard Board of Education. She was reelected twice and served three years as president of the board.

Entering politics after she and her husband moved to Omaha, Stothert was a candidate for the Nebraska Legislature in 2006. She was defeated by Steve Lathrop by 14 votes (5,073 to 5,059).

In 2009, Stothert was elected to the Omaha City Council (District 5), defeating Jon Blumenthal, 7,401 to 4,308.

=== Mayor of Omaha ===
On June 29, 2012, Stothert announced her candidacy for Mayor of Omaha. She raised $513,124 for her campaign, compared to $804,700 raised by incumbent Jim Suttle. Stothert received 32.2% of the votes in the April 2, 2013, primary election. She was elected mayor with 57.32% of vote on May 14, 2013, defeating Suttle. She is the first woman to hold this office.

Stothert was reelected in 2017. In 2019, there was a petition to get a recall of Stothert onto the ballot. According to Eric Scott, who filed the petition, the attempt failed due to insufficient funding and a lack of volunteers. Scott cited concerns about infrastructure and potholes as the primary reason for the attempt. Stothert won a third term as mayor in 2021.

In 2022, a charter convention was held to amend the Omaha city charter; the convention resulted in 24 proposed amendments. The most controversial amendment to pass delayed the process by which the city council president can be appointed acting mayor if the mayor leaves Omaha. An amendment adding sexual orientation and gender identity to the list of protected characteristics in the charter was rejected on grounds that a legal challenge to it could jeopardize other protected characteristics. In June 2023, an Omaha resident filed paperwork to start petitions for the removal of both Stothert and city councilman Vinny Palermo. The resident cited perceived corruption in the 2022 charter convention alongside a failure to repeal the restaurant tax as reasons to recall Stothert.

Residential areas and downtown Omaha have high levels of lead in the environment, which is believed to be the result of lead plants that previously operated in Omaha. The mayor's office and city council have created clean-up programs for residential homes and testing of contaminated soil. On February 3, 2023, Stothert and the City of Omaha were awarded $34.3 million to put toward these programs from the Environmental Protection Agency and the U.S. Department of Housing and Urban Development.

Stothert signed an executive order in August 2023 that addressed firearms on city-owned properties. The executive order bans the possession of concealed firearms and places public notices in the designated city-owned and city-leased land. In November 2023, Stothert signed two City Council resolutions to address gun control in Omaha. One removed state-mandated training and encourages residents to voluntarily seek training on gun use and safety. The second banned possession of home-assembled handgun kits. These resolutions were made in collaboration by Stothert, the Omaha City Council, and Police Chief Todd Schmaderer.

In November 2023, Stothert was named as the defendant in a federal lawsuit that contended that, by appointing Matt Kuhse as city attorney, she chose "a less qualified male candidate for the role". The plaintiff, Michelle Peters, was Deputy City Attorney of Omaha. In response, Kuhse contended that the previous city attorney, Paul Kratz, recommended that someone outside of the city law department be appointed. Stothert endorsed Republican nominee Donald Trump in the 2024 United States presidential election, which was said to have been a factor in her defeat in the 2025 mayoral election.

On May 13, 2025, Stothert lost reelection to John Ewing, the Douglas County treasurer.

== Personal life ==
Stothert married Joe Stothert in 1981. He became a critical care surgery specialist at the Nebraska Medical Center. The couple had two children, and were married until Joe Stothert died by suicide at age 72 on March 5, 2021, after struggling with his mental health during the COVID-19 pandemic in Nebraska. In July 2021, Stothert publicly refused to support additional mask mandates.

In May 2022, Stothert married J. Kevin O'Rourke, a retired anesthesiologist Stothert met when he was in medical school at St. Louis University and she was a critical care nurse at St. Louis University Hospital.

== See also ==
- List of mayors of the 50 largest cities in the United States
- List of mayors of Omaha, Nebraska
- Government of Omaha

Political offices
Preceded by Jim Suttle	Mayor of Omaha; 2013–2025	Succeeded by John Ewing
