= Constantino Mendieta =

American plastic surgeon

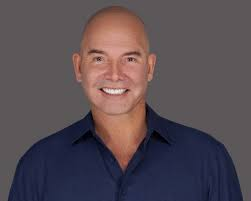
- Mendieta in January 2024
- Born: December 6, 1963 (age 62); Los Angeles, California, U.S.
- Education: Creighton University School of Medicine, University of Miami, Harvard University, Valleywise Health
- Organization(s): American Society of Plastic Surgeons, American Society for Aesthetic Plastic Surgery
- Known for: Buttock augmentation

Constantino Mendieta (born December 6, 1963) is an American plastic surgeon. He is considered a pioneer and leading practitioner of the buttock augmentation surgery known as a "Brazilian butt lift."

== Early life and education ==
Mendieta was born on December 6, 1963, in Los Angeles, California. He developed an interest in plastic surgery in Nicaragua, where his uncle practiced as a plastic surgeon.

Mendieta earned his medical degree from Creighton University School of Medicine. He completed general surgery training at Maricopa Medical Center in Phoenix, and plastic surgery at the University of Miami in Coral Gables, Florida. He received a Research Scholarship in Aesthetic Surgery from Harvard University.

== Career ==
In 1987, 1991 and 1993, Mendieta was a volunteer doctor for the American Cancer Society. Between 1996 and 1997, he was the medical director of Air Ambulance and flight surgeon. In 1998, he was a fellow at the Harvard Medical School. Later, he founded four Plastic Surgery Aesthetic Beauty Institutes in Miami, Florida, and was certified by the American Board of Physician Specialties.

In 2004, Mendieta was featured on Bravo's reality TV show Miami Slice.

Following increased media coverage of celebrities' buttocks, Mendieta's practice in buttock augmentation grew significantly. The proportion of such procedures in his practice rose from 10 percent in 2005 to 95 percent by 2015.

Mendieta has played an active role in promoting surgical safety in the field of cosmetic surgery. He joined the Multi-Society Task Force for Safety in Gluteal Fat Grafting, which issued formal practice advisories in 2018. He also serves as president of Surgeons for Safety, an advocacy group of plastic surgeons focused on improving surgical outcomes and opposing legislation that may restrict safe practices in buttock surgery.

== Controversies ==
In 2012, Mendieta was sued by a patient who claimed that a surgical implement was left in her body following a breast procedure. The case was settled out of court.

In October 2013, Betty Pino, a radio DJ, died due to an infection. According to the Miami-Dade County medical examiner's report, Mendieta performed reconstructive surgery on Pino's buttocks on June 14 to remove hardening silicone implants, and Pino developed infections in the wounds that would not heal. The report noted that Pino developed infections in the surgical wounds, leading to sepsis and subsequent complications that resulted in her death. Mendieta disputed the autopsy findings, citing "much misinformation in the report," as reported by the Miami Herald.

In 2020, fitness influencer Jenelle Butler filed a lawsuit against Mendieta and producers of the show The Doctors, alleging complications from a gluteal implant removal procedure. Mendieta denied the claims.

== Bibliography ==
- Mendieta, Constantino (2011). The Art of Gluteal Sculpting. Thieme Medical Publishing. ISBN 9781626236486.

== Selected publications ==
- Mofid, Mark; Steven Teitelbaum; Daniel Suissa; Arturo Ramirez-Montañana; Denis C Astarita; Robert Singer; Constantino Mendieta (July–August 2017). "Report on Mortality from Gluteal Fat Grafting: Recommendations from the ASERF Task Force". Aesthetic Surgery Journal. 37 (7): 796–806. doi:10.1093/asj/sjx004. PMC 5846701. PMID 28369293.
- Mendieta, Constantino (November 2006). "Gluteoplasty". Aesthetic Surgery Journal. 23 (6): 441–455. doi:10.1016/j.asj.2003.09.008.
- Mendieta, Constantino (July 2006). "Classification System for Gluteal Evaluation". Clinics in Plastic Surgery. 33 (3): 333–346. doi:10.1016/j.cps.2006.04.006. PMID 16818092.
