= Mike McDonnell =

American politician (born 1966)

Member of the Nebraska Legislature from the 5th district
- In office January 4, 2017 – January 8, 2025
- Preceded by: Heath Mello
- Succeeded by: Margo Juarez

Personal details
- Born: January 15, 1966 (age 60) Omaha, Nebraska, U.S.
- Party: Democratic (before 2024); Republican (2024–present)
- Spouse: Amy Grosse (m. 1993)
- Children: 1
- Education: University of Nebraska, Omaha (BA, AA); Bellevue University (MPA)
- Website: Campaign website

Mike McDonnell (born January 15, 1966) is an American politician who served in the Nebraska Legislature from 2017 to 2025, representing the 5th district. He was a Democrat before switching to the Republican Party in 2024 after being censured by the Nebraska Democratic Party for voting for anti-abortion legislation and a ban on transgender medical procedures for those under the age of 18. He serves as President of the Omaha Federation of Labor.

== Early life and education ==
McDonnell was born in Omaha, Nebraska. He graduated from Daniel J. Gross Catholic High School in 1984, the year he joined the Nebraska Democratic Party. He earned a bachelor's degree in criminal justice from the University of Nebraska Omaha in 1992, an associate's degree in fire protection technology in 1996, and a master's degree from Bellevue University in 2014.

== Career ==
McDonnell was a former chief of Omaha Professional Firefighters IAFF Local 385 for the City of Omaha under Mayor Al Veys. On November 8, 2013, Mike retired as Fire Chief from the Omaha Fire Department after 24 years. He also served with union groups Omaha Federation of Labor and AFL-CIO, later becoming its president.

=== Nebraska Legislature ===
Unlike any other United States legislature, the Nebraska Legislature is unicameral. Its members are elected without any official reference to political party affiliation. In 2016, McDonnell ran for the Legislature against Gilbert Ayala. Ayala is a member of the Republican Party and finished second in the 2016 nonpartisan primary, which saw McDonnell and Gilbert Ayala advance to that general election. McDonnell defeated Ayala in the general election with nearly 70% of the vote.

In 2020, McDonell won reelection after defeating Ayala again, but with a lower margin, of 63.2% of the vote.

McDonell could not run for re-election in 2024 due to term limits.

==== Abortion ====
McDonnell has stated that he was transparent about his anti-abortion stance when he ran for the Legislature in 2016. He has also stated his support for “heartbeat bills”. He backed failed legislation that would have banned abortion in Nebraska outright. In response, he was denied a voting role in the Douglas County Democratic Party by a vote of 17-3, with members determining his beliefs conflicted with the party's pro-choice platform.

==== LGBTQ rights ====
LGBTQ Nebraskans and allies have criticized Senator McDonnell for being the only Democrat in the Nebraska Legislature to support LB574, the “Adopt the Let Them Grow Act”, which bans transgender medical procedures for those under the age of 18.

==== Winner-take-all ====
McDonnell has opposed Republican efforts to move Nebraska to a winner-take-all electoral vote system for President, and as of 2024 is considered one of the deciding votes. Nebraska is one of two states (Maine being the other) that splits its electoral votes by congressional district. On September 19, 2024, McDonnell said he was a no on winner-take-all "as of today," though he was under pressure from many Republicans, including Donald Trump and Lindsey Graham, to change his position in what could be a decisive vote that might determine the outcome of the presidential election. McDonnell said four days later that he stood firm on his position and had recommended to governor Jim Pillen that the matter be submitted for a possible constitutional amendment.

==== Run for Omaha Mayor 2025 ====
Mike McDonnell ran for the office of Mayor of the city of Omaha, Nebraska in the 2025 election. On November 21, 2024 he officially announced his candidacy for Mayor of Omaha. He was eliminated in the top-two nonpartisan primary on April 1, 2025 placing third with 20% of the vote amongst a field of 5 candidates.

=== Nebraska Democratic Party censure ===
In response to McDonnell's positions around abortion and transgender healthcare, some Nebraska Democrats, especially the state chapter of Stonewall Democrats, proposed censuring the Senator. Following a meeting in Scottsbluff on July 15, 2023, the Nebraska Democratic Party officially censured McDonnell.

The proposed censure and admonishment of me by the Nebraska Democratic Party, because I am pro-life, is not going to change my informed conscience and religious beliefs!

— McDonnell response to censure

== Personal life ==
McDonnell is married to his wife Amy. He is Roman Catholic and resides in South Omaha, Nebraska. He has one child.

In February of 2018, McDonnell was arrested for suspicion of DUI.

== Electoral history ==
=== 2016 ===
Nebraska's 5th Legislative District Election, 2016
Primary election
Party	Candidate	Votes	%
Democratic	Mike McDonnell	2,036	76.0
Republican	Gilbert Ayala	641	24.0
Total votes		2,677	100.0
General election
Democratic	Mike McDonnell	7,120	70.1
Republican	Gilbert Ayala	3,028	29.8
Total votes		10,148	100.00
Democratic hold			

=== 2020 ===
Nebraska's 5th Legislative District Election, 2020
Primary election
Party	Candidate	Votes	%
Democratic	Mike McDonnell (incumbent)	3,578	70.0
Republican	Gilbert Ayala	1,536	30.0
Total votes		5,114	100.0
General election
Democratic	Mike McDonnell (incumbent)	6,947	63.2
Republican	Gilbert Ayala	4,053	36.8
Total votes		11,000	100.0
Democratic hold			

== See also ==
- List of American politicians who switched parties in office
