= Burke Harr =

American politician (born 1971)

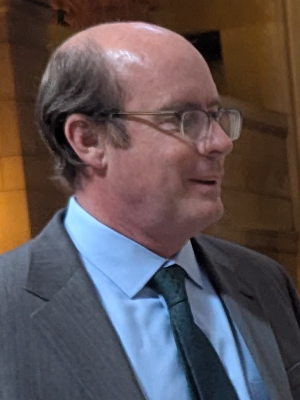

Member of the Nebraska Legislature from the 8th district
- In office January 2011 – January 2019
- Preceded by: Tom White
- Succeeded by: Megan Hunt

Personal details
- Born: October 13, 1971 (age 54) Illinois
- Party: Democratic
- Education: University of St. Thomas (B.A.); University of Notre Dame (J.D.)
- Profession: Attorney

Burke Harr (born October 13, 1971) is a politician from the U.S. state of Nebraska. Harr was a member of the Nebraska Legislature, in which he represented the 8th legislative district in Omaha, consisting of the midtown neighborhoods of Dundee and Benson and the neighborhoods that surround Creighton Preparatory School. Harr was barred from reelection in 2018 due to term limits.

Harr was born in Illinois. He grew up in Omaha, where he graduated from Creighton Preparatory School in 1990; he then attended the University of St. Thomas in Minneapolis-St. Paul, Minnesota. He subsequently studied law at the University of Notre Dame. He returned to Omaha for a clerkship with the Nebraska Court of Appeals, then worked as a Douglas County prosecutor, practiced real-estate law, and co-founded a business consulting firm.

In 2010, incumbent legislator Tom White declined to run for re-election, instead running for the position of U.S. Representative. In the nonpartisan primary election, Harr won 41% of the vote; businessman John Comstock won 31%; and Richard Ream won 28%. As the top two vote-getters, Harr and Comstock moved on to the general election. Harr, a member of the Democratic Party, opposed proposed across-the-board spending cuts to balance the state budget; Comstock, a Republican described as a Tea Party supporter, favored reducing the government's budget and ultimately eliminating the state's income tax. In the general election, Harr defeated Comstock by a margin of 51%–49%.

In 2014, Harr sought re-election to his legislative seat. He was challenged by Gwenn Aspen, a Republican property manager. Aspen was seeking office for the first time; she had been active in, and her husband Jeremy Aspen had been co-chair of, the Mayor Suttle Recall Committee, which in 2010–11 had made an unsuccessful attempt to recall mayor Jim Suttle. In April, an Aspen mailing accused Harr of ignoring problems with Nebraska's "good time" law, which allowed convicts to win early release from prison; in 2013, one such convict, Nikko Jenkins, had committed four murders in Omaha. In the May primary, Aspen obtained 2183 votes to Harr's 2076. Both candidates moved on to the general election, in which a proposal to raise Nebraska's minimum wage was also on the ballot. Harr supported the increase; Aspen opposed it. In the general election, Harr prevailed, with 4834 votes to Aspen's 3916.

Harr was elected as the vice-chairperson of the Business and Labor Committee in 2013. He also served on the Agriculture and Revenue Committees. Harr was a member of the Tax Modernization Committee, which was tasked with conducting a comprehensive examination of Nebraska's tax system.
