= Guest of a Guest =

Culture website

- Website type: Website
- Key people: Rachelle Hruska, CEO
- Website: guestofaguest.com
- Commercial: Yes
- Launched: 2008
- Current status: Inactive

Guest of a Guest is a website founded by Cameron Winklevoss and Rachelle Hruska that covers high society events, people, and places. Since its inception, Guest of a Guest has grown to include a picture database of thousands of people and events all over the world, with concentrations in New York City, the Hamptons, Los Angeles, Washington, D.C. and Miami. Business Insider has described the site as "the new Page Six."

The site has about 12 full-time employees and dozens of editors and photographers who cover local and international cultural events in places such as Miami, Chicago, London, Paris, and Berlin. Hruska serves as the chief executive officer.

== History ==
Hruska met Winklevoss in 2005 in New York City while writing a blog about the city's nightlife when Winklevoss convinced her to take on Guest of a Guest as a full-time company. The name Guest of a Guest originated when Rachelle Hruska noticed that many people on the party circuit did not own their own houses in the Hamptons. Instead, they crashed at other people's houses. "Everyone was a guest of a guest," she told the Wall Street Journal. Since the site's expansion to other major cities, the "guest of a guest" reference has taken on a new meaning, referring to how its users are receiving behind-the-scene images of the events. Guest of a Guest has hosted over fifteen thousand events since the website's founding. The digital media company describes its mission as aiming to build one of the largest searchable photo directories of both celebrity and non-celebrity guests at events.

Hruska became the sole owner of Guest of a Guest in 2012 when she purchased Winklevoss's stake in the company.

== Expansion ==
Guest of a Guest launched a Hamptons-centric site in the summer of 2008 with Los Angeles following in March 2010. Guest of a Guest first launched a daily newsletter in the summer of 2009. In 2012, the website began to cover global cultural events such as Cannes, Art Basel, Paris Fashion Week, and the Oscars.
