= Rachelle Hruska =

American new media entrepreneur (born 1983)

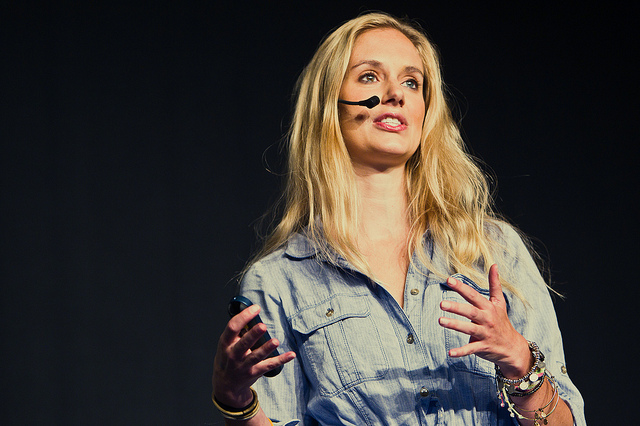
- Hruska at Big Omaha 2010
- Born: March 7, 1983 (age 43); Omaha, Nebraska
- Occupations: CEO, Guest of a Guest, Lingua Franca
- Known for: Guest of a Guest, Lingua Franca
- Website: rachellehruska.com

Rachelle J. Hruska MacPherson (born March 7, 1983) is an American new media entrepreneur. She is the co-founder and CEO of GuestofaGuest.com and Lingua Franca. In 2011, Fast Company named Hruska one of the Most Influential Women in Technology. In January 2013, the New York Post included Hruska as one of their 13 Under 30 Women to Watch.

== Early life and education ==
Hruska was raised in Lincoln, Nebraska, by her parents, Ron and Robin Hruska. Hruska attended Pius X High School. She graduated from Creighton University in 2005 where she majored in psychology.

== Career ==
In 2005, Hruska moved to New York City where she worked as a nanny for a Manhattan family. The following January she started an entry-level research position at Baron Capital Management and later became assistant to the chief executive, Ron Baron.

In May 2007, she founded the media website Guest of a Guest with Cameron Winklevoss. Hruska became CEO of the company. Hruska noticed party-goers in New York City would stay at other people's homes in the Hamptons and were all "a guest of a guest." Guest of a Guest was established to cover and photograph events and people in New York City and around the world. The company has offices in New York City, Los Angeles, Washington, DC, and the Hamptons. By 2009, the site received approximately 2 million page views monthly. In May 2009, the New York Post named Hruska "The Queen Bee" of the new wave of web scribes. Hruska purchased Winklevoss' stake in the company, becoming the sole owner of the website in 2012. That same year, Hruska continued to build out the site to cover global cultural events such as Cannes, Art Basel, Paris Fashion Week, and the Oscars. In November 2012, Hruska was featured on the cover of Scene Magazine.

In 2016, Hruska launched Lingua Franca, a New-York based fashion label that produces items with hand embroidered words after a therapist suggested she do something with her hands to ease her anxiety. Her first sweater said "Booyah" and gained attention when Hruska posted it on Instagram. Lingua Franca means "the common language" because the company's original products were sweaters with hip-hop lyrics. Hruska later expanded her line to include resistance sweaters including one worn by Connie Britton at the 75th Golden Globe Awards.

In 2018, Hruska collaborated with bag brand, MZ Wallace, to create limited edition Metro Tote. The tote, which is embroidered with text, "Give a Damn," was made to draw awareness to the need for more women in roles of political leadership. All of the proceeds from the collaboration support She Should Run, a non-partisan organization that supports women running for office.

== Personal life ==
Hruska married hotelier Sean MacPherson in summer 2011. They have two sons, Maxwell and Dashiell, and spend summers at their home in Montauk.
