= 2009 Omaha mayoral election =

- May 12, 2009
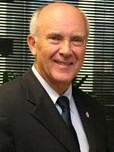

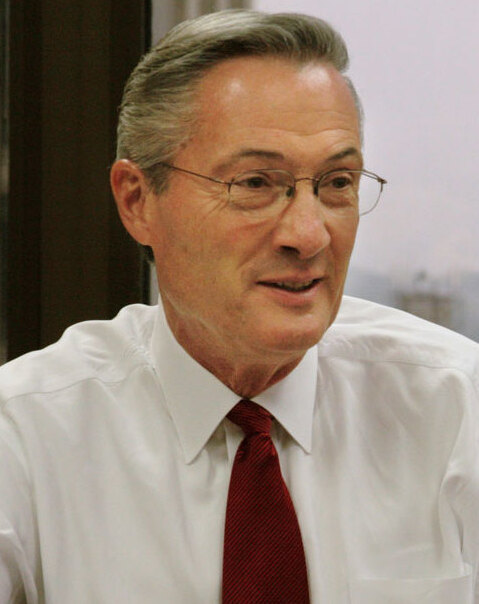
Nominee	Jim Suttle	Hal Daub
Popular vote	38,620	37,087
Percentage	50.47%	48.45%
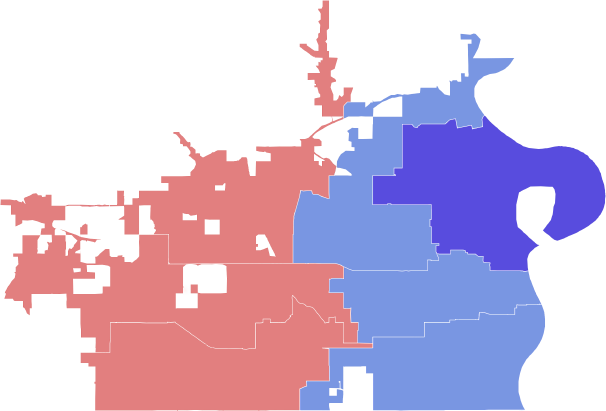
Results by city council district:
Suttle:
50–60%
70–80%
Daub:
50–60%
Mayor before election
Mike Fahey
Democratic
Elected mayor
Jim Suttle
Democratic

The 2009 Omaha mayoral election was held on May 12, 2009. Incumbent mayor Mike Fahey declined to seek a third term. City Councilman Jim Suttle narrowly defeated former Mayor Hal Daub. This would be the last mayoral race to be won by a Democrat until 2025.

== Primary election ==
=== Candidates ===
- Jim Suttle, member of the Omaha City Council from the 1st district
- Hal Daub, former Mayor of Omaha, former member of Congress from Nebraska's 2nd congressional district
- Jim Vokal, member of the Omaha City Council from the 3rd district
- Randy William Brown
- Mort Sullivan

=== Results ===
2009 Omaha mayoral primary election results
Party	Candidate	Votes	%
Nonpartisan	Hal Daub	16,269	33.09%
Nonpartisan	Jim Suttle	15,842	32.21%
Nonpartisan	Jim Vokal	12,749	25.92%
Nonpartisan	Randy William Brown	530	1.08%
Nonpartisan	Mort Sullivan	251	0.51%
Write-in		103	0.21%
Total votes		49,744	100.00%

== General election ==
=== Polling ===
Poll source	Date(s) administered	Sample size	Margin of error	Suttle (D)	Daub (R)	Undecided
Wiese Research Associates	April 28-30, 2009	384	4.9%	39%	42%	20%

Key

- A – all adults
- RV – registered voters
- LV – likely voters
- V – unclear

=== Results ===
2009 Omaha mayoral general election results
Party	Candidate	Votes	%
Nonpartisan	Jim Suttle	38,620	50.47%
Nonpartisan	Hal Daub	37,087	48.45%
Write-in		415	0.54%
Total votes		76,122	100.00%
