= Patrick Bourne =

American politician

Member of the Nebraska Legislature from the 8th district
- In office 1999–2007
- Preceded by: Eric J. Will
- Succeeded by: Tom White

Personal details
- Born: April 11, 1964 (age 62) Omaha, Nebraska
- Party: Democratic

Patrick Bourne (born April 11, 1964) is an American politician from the U.S. state of Nebraska. He is a former member of the Nebraska Legislature and an attorney in Omaha, Nebraska.

Bourne was born in Omaha, Nebraska. He graduated from Southeast Community College in 1984, University of Nebraska at Omaha in 1994 and Creighton University School of Law in 1997.

He was elected in 1998 to represent the 8th Nebraska legislative district and reelected in 2002. In his final term, he sat on the Education and Nebraska Retirement Systems committees as well as the Committee on Committees and the chairperson of the Judiciary committee. Due to term limits, he was not able to run for re-election in 2006.
