= Hal Daub =

American lawyer and politician

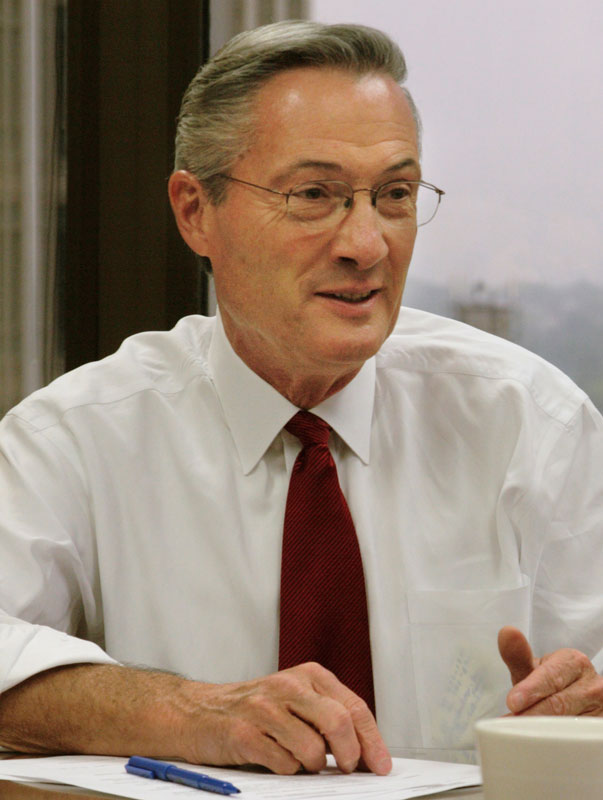

Chair of the Social Security Advisory Board
- In office March 20, 2002 – September 30, 2006
- President: George W. Bush
- Preceded by: Mark Weinberger
- Succeeded by: Mark Warshawsky

48th Mayor of Omaha
- In office January 9, 1995 – June 11, 2001
- Preceded by: Subby Anzaldo
- Succeeded by: Mike Fahey

Member of the U.S. House of Representatives from Nebraska's 2nd district
- In office January 3, 1981 – January 3, 1989
- Preceded by: John Cavanaugh
- Succeeded by: Peter Hoagland

Personal details
- Born: Harold John Daub Jr. April 23, 1941 (age 85) Fort Bragg, North Carolina, U.S.
- Party: Republican
- Education: Washington University (BS); University of Nebraska–Lincoln (JD)

Military service
- Allegiance: United States
- Branch/service: United States Army
- Years of service: 1966–1968

Harold John Daub Jr. (born April 23, 1941) is an American lawyer and politician from Nebraska who served four terms in the United States House of Representatives and as the 48th mayor of Omaha, Nebraska. In 2012, Daub was elected to the Board of Regents of the University of Nebraska system. He is a member of the Republican Party.

== Background ==
Born at Fort Bragg, near Fayetteville, North Carolina, where his father was stationed in the military, Daub grew up in North Omaha. He graduated from Benson High School before receiving his B.S. from Washington University in St. Louis, in 1963, and his J.D. from the University of Nebraska College of Law in Lincoln, Nebraska in 1966. He served in the United States Army as an infantry captain from 1966 to 1968 in Korea. Daub is a Distinguished Eagle Scout. Daub settled in Omaha, where he went into private practice of law.

== Political career ==
After moving to Omaha, Daub became active in the Republican Party.

=== Congress ===
He ran for the United States House of Representatives in the Omaha-based 2nd congressional district in 1978, losing to incumbent Democrat John J. Cavanaugh III. Cavanaugh declined to run for re-election in 1980 and Daub ran for the seat again, defeating Democrat Richard Fellman. Daub was reelected three times, in 1982, 1984, and 1986.

In March 1987, Nebraska's senior U.S. Senator Edward Zorinsky, a Democrat, died of a heart attack and Governor Kay A. Orr appointed businessman David Karnes to fill the seat. Daub challenged Karnes in the Republican primary for election to a full term in the Senate in 1988, but lost by nine points to Karnes, who then lost the general election to former Democratic Governor Bob Kerrey. In 1990, Daub challenged the state's other Democratic senator, J. James Exon, for reelection, easily winning the Republican nomination, but losing the general election by a substantial margin to Exon.

Ginni Thomas, wife of Supreme Court Justice Clarence Thomas, worked as an assistant for Daub in the 80s. Their families had known each other previously. Thomas eventually became Daub's legislative director.

=== Mayor ===
In 1995, Daub won a special election for Mayor of Omaha following the resignation of Mayor P. J. Morgan, and was narrowly elected to a full term in 1997, both times defeating city councilwoman Brenda Council. In 2001, he was defeated for reelection by insurance executive Mike Fahey in a close race. Daub then served as a member of the Social Security Advisory Board from 2002 to 2006 and joined Missouri-based law firm Blackwell Sanders Peper Martin LLP (now Husch Blackwell) in 2005.

In 2007, Daub briefly ran for the U.S. Senate seat being vacated by Senator Chuck Hagel; he exited the race to offer an early endorsement to Mike Johanns, former Nebraska governor and USDA secretary, who won the seat.

In 2008, Daub announced he was running again for Mayor of Omaha in the 2009 election. In the April 2009 primary, he received the most votes; however, in the May 2009 runoff election, he lost to Jim Suttle, with unofficial final results of 48.7% to 50.7%. In that election, Democrats also gained control of the city council.

=== Later career ===
Daub served for five years on the board of Omaha's Metropolitan Entertainment and Convention Authority (MECA). In 2012, he was elected to the board of regents of the University of Nebraska system. In 2018, he was defeated in his reelection bid by Barbara Weitz.

Daub has held several lobbyist positions including at Blackwell Sanders LLP, and Deloitte.

Currently, Daub is a member of the ReFormers Caucus of Issue One.

== Controversy ==
As a University regent, Daub called for football players to be removed from the Nebraska Cornhuskers because they knelt during the national anthem in 2017 as a protest against police violence. Daub later denied having calling for the players' removal. Coach Mike Riley said that Daub's view of the protest as unpatriotic was a misinterpretation.

When senator Julie Slama reported in 2022 that she had been sexually assaulted by Charles Herbster, Daub remarked that he wanted to put Slama on a witness stand because "I'd like to ask her what she was wearing." He was publicly criticized for this, and for saying that Slama "was trying to attract Herbster's attention because she was trying to get reelected in her own right," at the gathering where she says she was assaulted.

U.S. House of Representatives
Preceded by John Cavanaugh	Member of the U.S. House of Representatives from Nebraska's 2nd congressional district 1981–1989	Succeeded by Peter Hoagland
Party political offices
Preceded by Nancy Hoch	Republican nominee for U.S. Senator from Nebraska (Class 2); 1990	Succeeded by Chuck Hagel
Political offices
Preceded by Subby Anzaldo	Mayor of Omaha; 1995–2001	Succeeded by Mike Fahey
U.S. order of precedence (ceremonial)
Preceded by Kevin Yoder as Former U.S. Representative	Order of precedence of the United States as Former U.S. Representative	Succeeded by Ken Kramer as Former U.S. Representative
