= Jim Suttle =

American politician

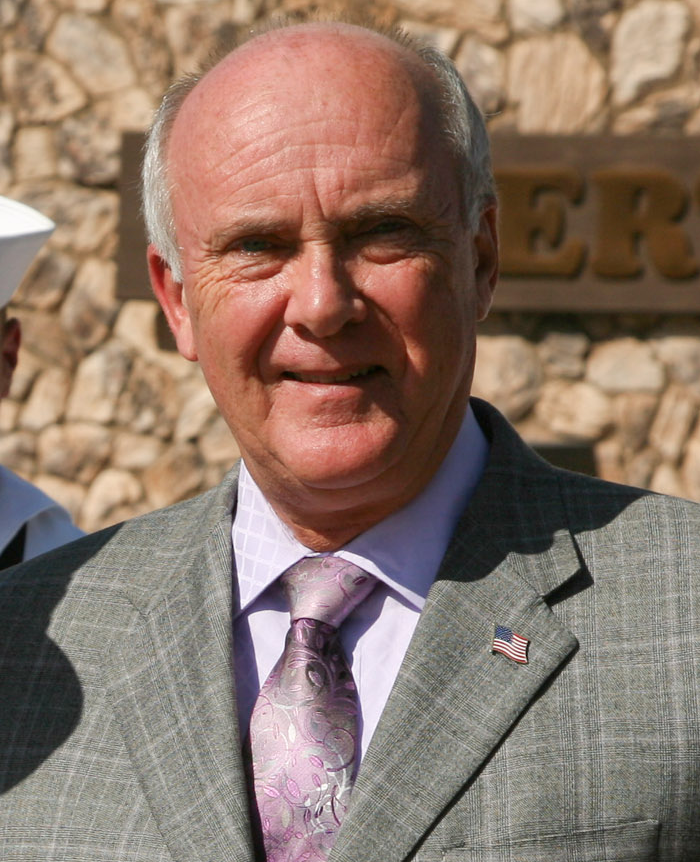

50th Mayor of Omaha
- In office June 8, 2009 – June 10, 2013
- Preceded by: Mike Fahey
- Succeeded by: Jean Stothert

Member of the Omaha City Council
- In office June 6, 2005 – June 8, 2009
- Preceded by: Marc Kraft
- Succeeded by: Pete Festersen

Personal details
- Born: June 13, 1944 (age 82) Morrison, Colorado, U.S.
- Party: Democratic
- Spouse: Deborah Suttle
- Children: 2
- Education: West Virginia University
- Profession: Engineer

James H. Suttle (born June 13, 1944) is an American corporate executive, engineer, and politician who served as the 50th mayor of Omaha, Nebraska from 2009 to 2013. He is a member of the Democratic Party.

After narrowly winning a recall election in 2011, He lost reelection to Republican Jean Stothert in 2013

== Early career ==
Suttle attended West Virginia University, graduating with his bachelor's degree and master's degree in civil engineering. He worked for Henningson, Durham & Richardson, an Omaha-based engineering firm until 1981, when newly elected Mayor Mike Boyle appointed him as the city's public works director. He served as public works director until 1987, when he returned to HDR.

== City Council ==
In 2005, Suttle announced that he would challenge City Councilman Marc Kraft, a Republican, in the 1st district, which was based in the neighborhoods of Benson, Dundee, and Florence. Suttle, a Democrat, challenged Kraft, a Republican, along with Republican businessman Rick Bettger. In the primary election, Suttle placed first with 39% of the vote, leading Kraft, who won 36%, and Bettger, who won 24%. In the general election, Suttle narrowly defeated Kraft, winning 53% of the vote to Kraft's 46%.

== Mayor of Omaha ==
When Mayor Mike Fahey announced that he would not seek re-election in 2009, Suttle ran to succeed him, running against Hal Daub, the former Mayor and a former member of Congress, and fellow City Councilman Jim Vokal. At the primary election, Daub and Suttle placed first and second, winning 33% and 32% of the vote, respectively. In the general election, despite Daub's higher name recognition, Suttle narrowly defeated him, winning 50% of the vote to Daub's 48%.

In fall of 2010, shortly into Suttle's second year in office, an opposition campaign organized a recall campaign against him, citing his decision to raise taxes during a recession. The organizers ultimately gathered enough signatures to place a recall election on the ballot in 2011. Suttle narrowly defeated the recall, with voters opposed to the recall outvoting supporters with 51% of the vote.

Suttle ran for re-election in 2013, and faced several prominent challengers, including City Councilwoman Jean Stothert, businessman Dave Nabity, State Senator Brad Ashford, and former City Councilman Dan Welch. Suttle placed a distant second in the primary election, winning 24% of the vote to Stothert's 32%. At the ensuing general election, Suttle was defeated in a landslide, winning just 43% of the vote to Stothert's 57%.

Preceded by Mike Fahey	Mayor of Omaha; 2009-2013	Succeeded by Jean Stothert
