= Mike Fahey =

American businessman and politician

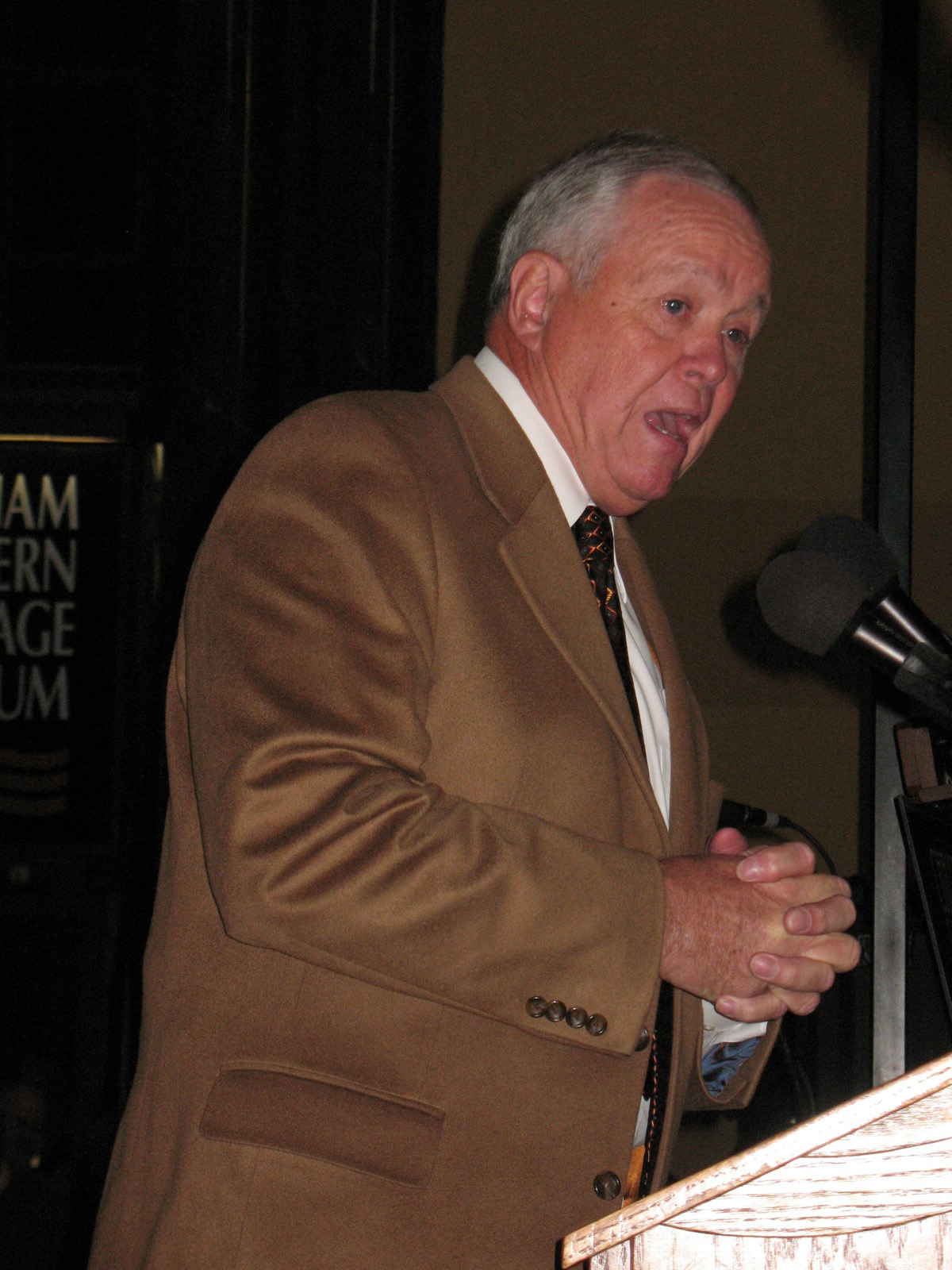

49th Mayor of Omaha
- In office June 11, 2001 – June 8, 2009
- Preceded by: Hal Daub
- Succeeded by: Jim Suttle

Personal details
- Born: December 20, 1943 (age 82) Kansas City, Missouri, U.S.
- Party: Democratic
- Education: Creighton University

Michael Gahan Fahey (born December 20, 1943) is an American businessman who served as the 49th mayor of Omaha, Nebraska. He first took office on June 11, 2001. Fahey won his second term in the May 2005 election. He is a member of the Democratic Party and the Mayors Against Illegal Guns Coalition, a bi-partisan group with a stated goal of "making the public safer by getting illegal guns off the streets."

== Biography ==
After graduating from Creighton University in 1973, Fahey founded American Land Title Company, a small title insurance company. He sold the company in 1990, but continued as CEO until retiring in 1997. Fahey was on the Omaha Planning Board from 1981 to 1991. He has three sons and one daughter.

== Controversy ==
In October 2006 the City of Omaha Safety Auditor Tristan Bonn submitted a report which detailed Omaha Police Department officers' alleged aggressive, rude and unwarranted traffic stops, which unprecedentedly involved African Americans and other people of color. Within a week Fahey fired her, as he called Bonn "insubordinate" for submitting the report. The incident has caused ire within North Omaha particularly. While the discussion of whether or not to keep the auditor position continues, Fahey's office is investigating the issues that previously were lodged with the Public Safety Auditor.

Fahey has been criticized for his decision to build a new baseball stadium in downtown Omaha as a means to securing a long-term contract with the NCAA to keep the College World Series in Omaha. As a result of this, a group of Omaha residents circulated a proposal to recall Fahey. This petition drive failed, with the Recall Fahey campaign collecting only 8,202 of the required 21,734 signatures.

== Future ==
On July 29, 2008, Fahey announced he would not be seeking reelection for Mayor of Omaha in 2009.

== Legacy ==
At the end of Mike Fahey's term in 2009, the City of Omaha named a section of Webster Street in downtown, between 10th and 17th streets, in his honor.

Political offices
Preceded by Hal Daub	Mayor of Omaha; 2001–2009	Succeeded by Jim Suttle
