= Market House (Omaha) =

Coordinates: 41.261°N 95.933°W

Omaha Market House
- Interactive map of the Omaha Market House area

General information
- Architectural style: Commercial Vernacular
- Location: Omaha, Nebraska, United States
- Construction started: 1904
- Completed: 1904
- Demolished: 1930
- Client: City of Omaha

The Market House was a controversial fresh produce, meat and fish outlet on Capitol Avenue from North 12th to North 14th Avenues in Downtown Omaha, Nebraska. After almost 40 years of debate and delays in building it, the City of Omaha built the Market House in 1904. The local National Guard squatted in the building for almost 20 years, and afterward it was entirely demolished by 1930.

== History ==
The market square is a feature of many European and colonial towns. It is an area where market stalls are traditionally set out for trading of a variety of goods, commonly on one particular day of the week known as market day. In Omaha, there was agitation for a market square as early as 1860, but nothing happened for more than two decades. The 1846 plat for Winter Quarters and the 1856 plat for the town of Florence both included market squares. Today, the North Market Square Park in Florence commemorates the historic location.

=== 1860s ===
Jefferson Square was platted as a park in the original Omaha City plat of 1854. Despite being the only park in city limits, it was often the target of ambitious politicians and others. For instance, in 1858 the Omaha City Council passed a resolution to build the first public school in Omaha in the park. In 1867, the city council changed its mind and recommended the building be removed, and it was. The next January, the first proposal for a market house in Omaha came from J. L. Williams, a government director with the Union Pacific Railroad. The city council accepted the measure with the stipulation that the City of Omaha could buy the building in six years. However, the offer was never enacted.

=== 1870s ===
In 1870, an industrialist named Lyman Bridges first came forward with a proposition to build a market house on the square, which proposition was indefinitely postponed by the council. In 1877, the city council held an election for voters on whether to establish two market houses, including one on Jefferson Square and the other south of Farnam Street. Many of the young city's leaders jumped on board with Lyman's idea. Experience Estabrook advocated the universal building idea, with one structure housing the market house, public offices, city hall and the police court. John A. Creighton suggested the market house could be beautified with trees, while John I. Redick suggested rent could bring in $40,000 annually.

Voters opposed the plan and no further action happened.

=== 1880s ===
In 1881, a former Union Pacific official named Webster Snyder proposed that he would personally secure money for a market house be built in Omaha's first park, Jefferson Square. Costing US$200,000, Snyder said he could get "enough money out of New York and Boston to build a half dozen market houses [in Omaha]." Snyder's plan included housing the market house with a new city hall, and he committed to contracting popular Omaha architect Louis Mendelssohn to design the building.

The plan was quickly dismissed by the city council. Snyder's plan hitched the concept to a 50-year-lease, and apparently the idea of forcing city offices to be located in the building for so long was unappealing. In early 1882, the issue was put to a public vote in which the ballot asked, "' 'Shall the city lease Jefferson Square for the erection of a market house and city hall. Yes or No." The popular vote passed.

However, Snyder reportedly withdrew his offer due to the drawn out nature of the process, and the plan went nowhere. He also moved away from Omaha. Snyder's proposal was cited by the proponents in the early 1900s effort to get a market house built.

Development of the market house stalled by 1884, and nothing was built. The issue was raised again in 1887, this time with a glass and steel building rising in the middle of Capitol Avenue over a full basement, all of which would be packed with vendors. It didn't take off, either.

=== 1890s ===
Beginning in the early 1890s, some advocates began calling for a market house to sell their wares. When the Omaha Commercial Club began canvassing local sources, they discovered many prominent Omaha families were shipping their own produce and wares directly to Omaha from Atchinson, Kansas, where there was a market square. They wanted that access to fresh produce and more for more Omahans, and began canvassing the county. A national survey of cities with market houses done by the Omaha World-Herald in 1894 shared responses from Columbus, Ohio; Indianapolis, Indiana; Pittsburgh, Pennsylvania; St. Joseph and Kansas City, both in Missouri. Each city reported wild success with their markets, quickly recuperating the cost of building them and easily maintaining their success over a number of years. Only the Pittsburgh Market Square still operates today, more than 120 years later. Later, the citation of Boston's Faneuil Hall earning $85,000 annually around 1890 assuaged many concerns for the future of Omaha's market house. An Omaha City Councilman named Prince championed the cause.

There were initial plans made to construct a temporary market to test the concept, but were killed within a month of the proposal to the city council. The next plan involved building a two-story brick building in the middle of Capitol Avenue, but after learning that other cities designated entire blocks to their market houses, that idea was nixed. In November 1892, the Omaha Commercial Club received permission from the City of Omaha to build the market house. In 1893, the Omaha Commercial Club set the cost to the city at $200,000 to secure the land and build. The market house itself was going to be 50 feet wide by 260 feet long. Made of local red brick, it was set to be two stories tall. Consensus on the location of the market house supported the Capitol Avenue location, with approval from a variety of figures including Alvin Saunders, the last Governor of the Nebraska Territory, who suggested there would "probably be three" market houses within a decade.

The 1887 City of Omaha Board of Trade reported that residents in the city still wanted a market house. People believed they would save money on produce and meats, and they thought a market house would bring those savings.<.

=== 1900s ===
The topic of building a market house didn't ever quite go away. A 1900 editorial suggested that the construction of the Omaha Auditorium should dovetail with the erection of a market house, perhaps even combining the two. It wound up being built in 1904 almost a mile from the site of the market house.

In early 1902, the Omaha Grocers' Association stated their firm opposition to a market house. They were the force behind the present-day Old Market, which was housed in Dr. Mercer's buildings almost a mile away. Harry Fisher, the organization's leader, said that retail grocers would "fight the building of the market house to the bitter end."

A long editorial in the December 1901 edition of the Omaha World-Herald advocated locating the Market House in the middle of Capitol Avenue again in order to avoid the cost of land acquisition. Citing the advice of Senator Charles F. Manderson of Omaha, the writer was a grocer who signed the article L.V. Morse, and they had a concrete plan. Capitol Avenue was 146 wide at this point. The writer proposed two market house buildings, each 264 feet long, or taking a total of two city blocks, that were 40 feet wide. They wanted four rows of stalls in each one totally 176 stalls that were 12 feet wide and eight feet long. The lots would extend 40 feet into the street, leaving one lane on each side of the market for wagon traffic on market days. Advocating for two stories, Morse suggested the initial structure should cost no more than $30,000 to build.

In October 1892, Dr. Samuel D. Mercer again led the opposition. He and a group of opponents sought an injunction against the Commercial Club building the market house. The group contested that there were four main issues:

- The lifespan of the building's roof wouldn't be long enough;
- Traffic on Capitol Avenue would be restrained too much by the location of the building;
- The cost of the building was too high, the City didn't have the right to use general funds to build it, and the city's funds were too low; and
- The City government didn't have the right to change the usage of the land from the original owner's intentions. They believed the land it was sited on wasn't intended for usage as a market house in the original plat of the city made by the Council Bluffs and Nebraska Ferry Company

Dr. Mercer and his crew quickly pounced on the opportunity to launch a trial, which quickly veered public sentiment and legal favor against the market house. In early November 1902, the courts awarded Mercer an injunction against the market house by ruling that the City of Omaha effectively could not build on that specific land "in perpetuity." It probably wasn't a coincidence that Mercer was a property owner in the area where the city's early markets were located around South 11th and Jackson Streets. However, on November 27, 1902, a local judge named Dickinson found against the injunction and approved the project. Mercer's group dropped their objections.

However, another court case arrived within a year.

=== Construction ===
A year later Dickinson also ruled in favor of the idea that the City of Omaha could order produce sellers to use the market house. Grocers protested that giving up their neighborhood wagon stalls and spots in the warehouse district (present-day Old Market) would cost them business. On August 30, 1903, the Capitol Avenue Market House opened. It was Omaha's first public market house, and was competition to the private Omaha Wholesale Market House Company housed in Dr. Mercer's building at South 11th and Jackson. The Omaha World-Herald 's resistance continued, with a facetious commentary about the stalls staying empty a week after its opening. The new building was 240 feet long, with a single story for the first 140 feet and a second story over the second part of the building. There were dozens of stalls on the first floor, along with a restaurant and small storefronts underneath the second story. The second story had a meeting room.

The grocers' resistance eventually worked though. After opening in 1904, within a year the facility was declared a failure by the Omaha Retailer Grocers' Association.

Market house was apparently never used as a market.

=== Re-use and Demolition ===
Ideas were floated for the re-use of the building almost immediately. In 1906, a real estate schemer suggested it be used as an ice house. With the majority of the city's ice controlled by a monopoly, this salesman suggested the city form a public ice company to control the prices of ice. That plan didn't move forward. That same year, the World-Herald proposed the building be repurposed as a workhouse, which came into fashion in the United States during that era.

In 1907, a dirigible called "Comet" was built at the empty Market House. The Comet was a 55-foot long cigar-shaped bag filled with hydrogen. The builder later reported he was given permission to use the old building because he promised to fly over the city hall.

Later in 1907, two National Guard companies took over the market house, which was deserted entirely by this point. The companies snuck into the building in the middle of the night and planned to keep using the building, since their recent contract at the Creighton Theatre had expired. They committed to maintaining the building if allowed to use it, effectively squatting there for almost twenty years.

In 1910, the city council proposed taking down the market house and reusing the materials to build a tool house on Nicholas Street. Apparently, only half the building was used for this, and the other half stood. In 1917, a market square was proposed for downtown Omaha. It would have been an open-air gazebo-type building with no permanent walls or vendor stalls. However, despite claiming the support from grocers across the city, it apparently didn't happen, either. The Omaha Women's Club was rumored to use the other half of the market house supplies for a new headquarters.

The private Omaha Wholesale Produce Market House Company operated as a monopoly over the market house concept for several years afterward. Their building was located at 11th and Jackson Streets. The Old Market served as the city's retail and wholesale produce district for almost a century.

The market house was demolished by 1930, and today there's no remnants or signage designating its history or location.

Its lessons weren't totally lost though: In 1933, longtime city parks commissioner Joseph Hummel cited the case of using Jefferson Square in the city council's bid to replace it with a parking lot. When asked about the city's plans, he remarked, "It can't be done! Didn't they try to put a market house on Jefferson Square some years ago?" The implication was plain: In the 1880s, the court ruled against using Jefferson Square for anything other than a park, including the market house. Almost 50 years later, Hummel employed that logic against removing it.

The Jefferson Square was ultimately lost to the development of I-680 in the 1950s.

== See also ==
- History of Omaha, Nebraska
- Timeline of Omaha, Nebraska history
