= Jefferson Square (Omaha) =

Former public park in Nebraska, USA

- Interactive map of Jefferson Square
- Type: Municipal (Omaha)
- Location: Downtown Omaha
- Coordinates: 41°15′48″N 95°56′11″W
- Area: 61 acres (250,000 m^{2})
- Created: 1856
- Status: Razed in 1969

Jefferson Square was the last of three original public parks extant in Omaha, Nebraska. Bounded by North 15th, 16th, Chicago and Cass Streets, the park was dedicated on November 25, 1865. It was razed by the city March 18, 1969 to make way for the construction of Interstate 480 in Downtown Omaha. Before that time it was the site of Omaha's first school, and considered for the location of the first Omaha Public Library and the Omaha Market House.

== History ==
The original dimensions of the park, as surveyed by Alfred D. Jones, were 264 by 280 feet (85 m). After being platted in 1856, the park was formally opened in 1865. It was one of three parks originally platted for the downtown area. Early settlers reported finding black bears at the park, and later complained when there were no bison there to hunt.

The first public school in Omaha was built on the southwest corner of Jefferson Square in September 1863. It was a small, one-room wooden structure, and was moved in 1865. In 1875, the park hosted the launching of the Omaha Bee hot air balloon, an advertising stunt by businessman Edward Rosewater. The balloon was the first in the city, and caused a stir when it was launched across the city.

In 1893, the Government of Omaha drew a lawsuit from a local citizen when they began constructing the Omaha Market House at the park. The case quickly veered public sentiment and legal favor, with a Nebraska Supreme Court ruling effectively preventing the city from building on the land "in perpetuity." The park hosted some events for the 1898 Trans-Mississippi Exposition, as well. Eventually, the Omaha Market House was built at North 12th and Capitol Avenue, and stood from 1904 until 1910. It the 1910s the park was said to host "thousands of people daily."

In addition to the market house, there were several other public structures proposed for the park. They included a school, which was built in 1863 and moved in 1878; an 1876 proposed military headquarters that eventually became Fort Omaha; an 1878 proposed joint city/county building; the proposed market house, which came up repeatedly from 1884 to 1901; a proposed public library in 1887; a proposed city hall in 1889; an 1894 proposed auditorium; a proposed federal post office in 1897; a proposed armory in 1906; a proposed museum in 1910; a 1915 proposed fire station; a public bathhouse built in 1918 and demolished in 1945; a gymnasium proposed in 1918; and the Interstate 480, built in 1966 and still standing today.

By the 1930s, the park had become a congregation place for homeless people. The city erected public baths which became very popular. By the end of that decade, the park was regarded as "less than desirable" and "disreputable" and was the target of city planners for redevelopment.

By the late 1950s, the park was targeted for demolition to accommodate the new Interstate Highway System. When the park was demolished in 1969 to make room for Interstate 480, it was the focus of intense preservation efforts led by Omaha citizens. However, their efforts failed, and the park was lost.

== See also ==
- Old Post Office (Omaha)
- Old City Hall (Omaha)
- Jobbers Canyon
- Parks in Omaha
