= List of parks in Omaha, Nebraska =

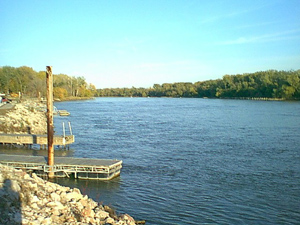
Docks at Dodge Park

This is a list of parks in Omaha, Nebraska. It includes cemeteries and golf courses. Most parks in Omaha are governed by the City of Omaha Parks and Recreation Department.

== History ==
In 1854 Alfred D. Jones drew four parks on the original map of Omaha City. They were called Jefferson Square, which was paved over by I-480; Washington Park, which is where the Paxton Block currently sits at North 16th and Farnam Streets; Capitol Square, where Omaha Central High School is now located, and; an unnamed tract overlooking the river with Davenport Street on the north, Jackson Street on the south, North 8th on the east and North 9th Street on the west. Jefferson Square lasted until 1969, when it was razed to make way for a new interstate in downtown Omaha. The riverfront from the interstate south to the headquarters of ConAgra Foods is now the Heartland of America Park.

Hanscom Park became Omaha's first park. Miller, Fontenelle, Elmwood and Riverview were Omaha's largest parks in 1920. (Riverview Park Zoo eventually became Henry Doorly Zoo.) Levi Carter Park was its largest, at 220 acres (0.89 km^{2}). Other parks in the system that year were Bemis, Deer, Kountze Park, Curtis Turner, Harold Gifford, Mercer, Jefferson Square, Hixenbaugh, Burt playground, Bluff View, Spring Lake, Highland, McKinley, Clear View and Morton.

Omaha's boulevard system was designed to be part of the parks system in 1889 by renowned landscape architect Horace Cleveland. The Omaha Park and Boulevard System was listed on the National Register of Historic Places in 2013.

== Administration ==
The Department of Parks, Recreation, and Public Property is the City of Omaha's agency responsible for administering public parks.

== Current parks ==
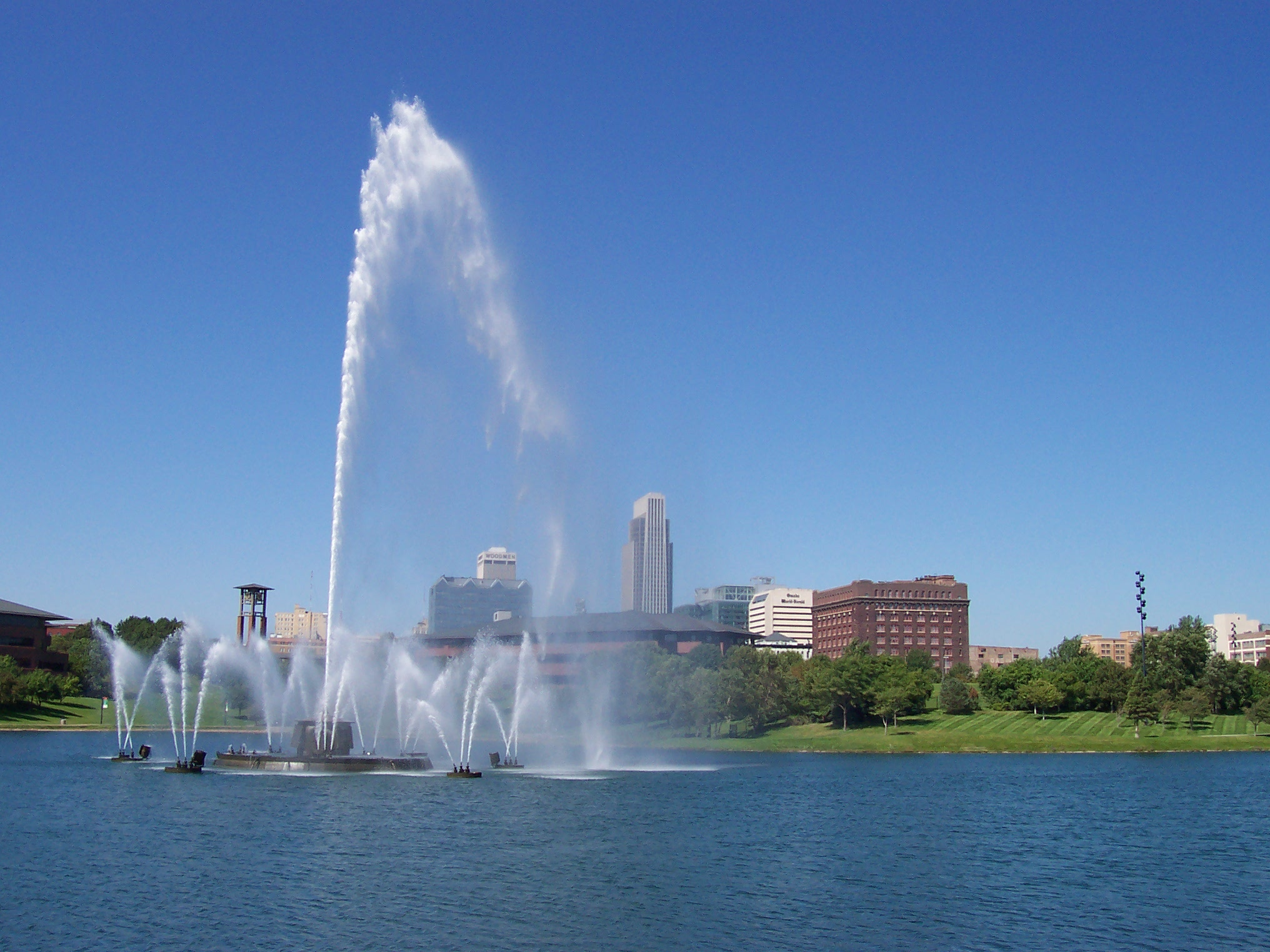
The fountain in Heartland of America Park, with the Omaha skyline behind

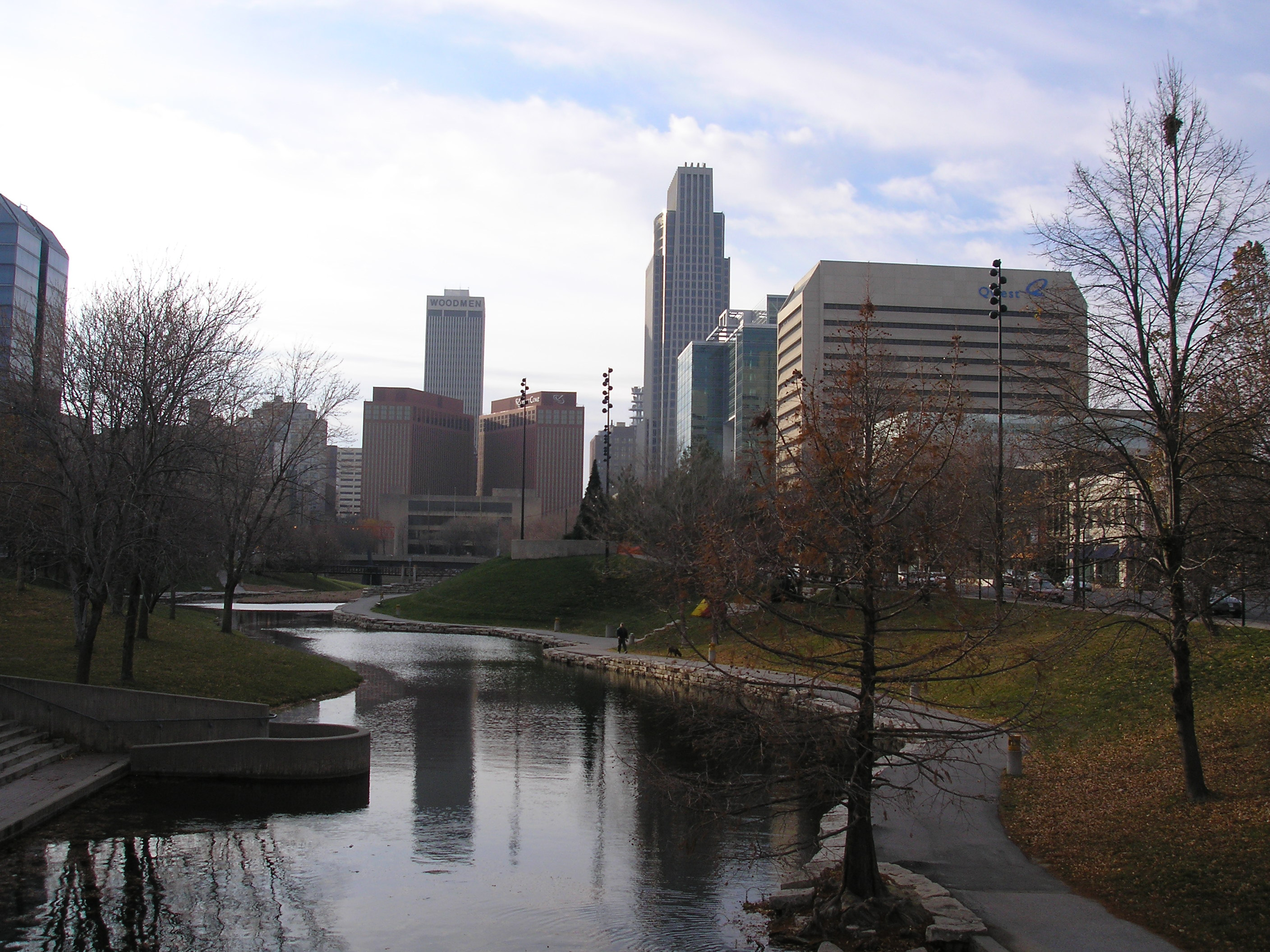
Gene Leahy Mall, looking west towards Downtown Omaha

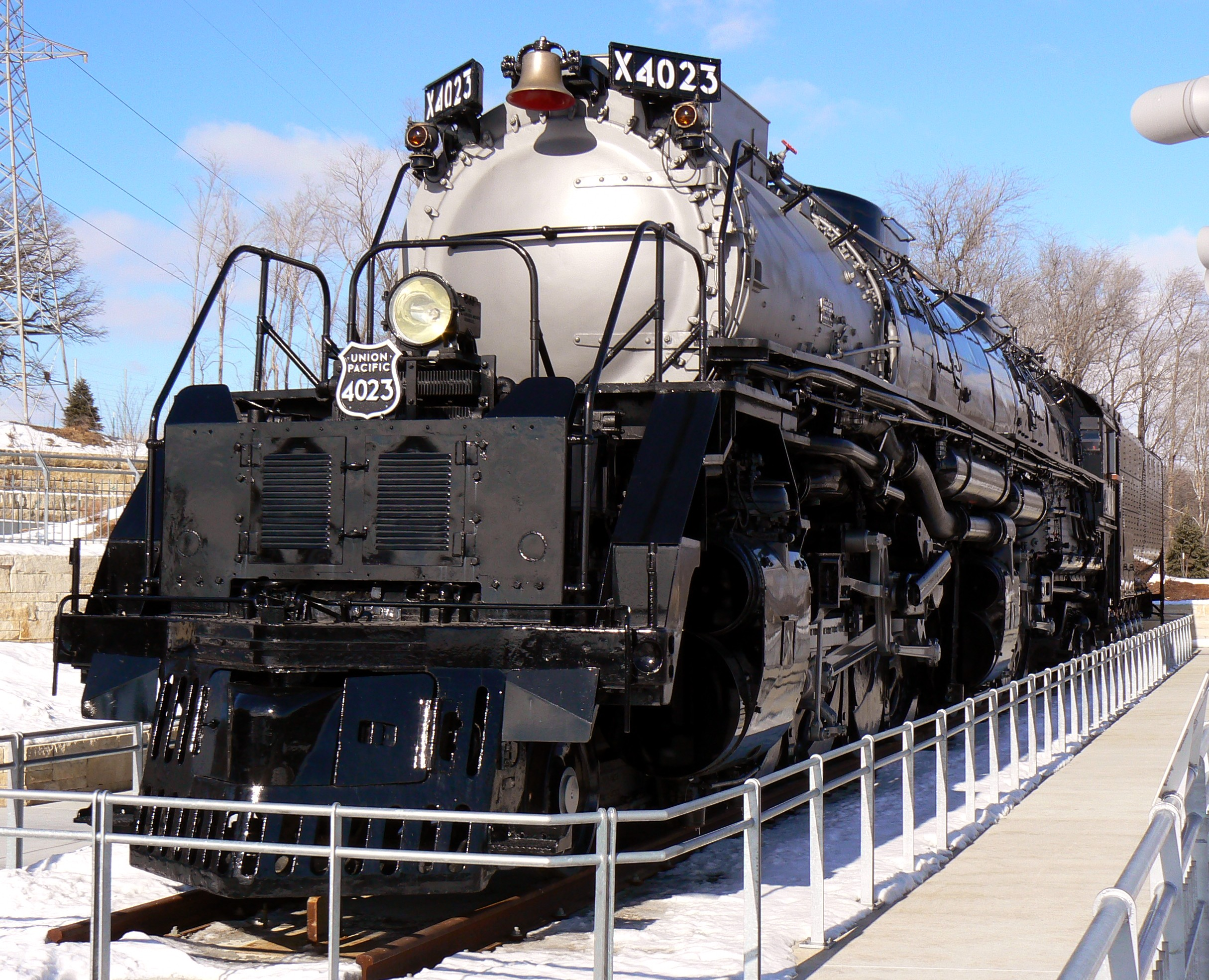
Big Boy #4023 at Kenefick Park

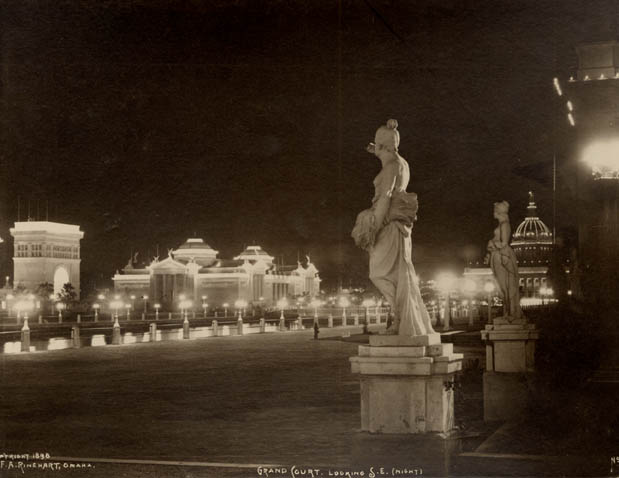
The Grand Court of the Trans-Mississippi Exposition of 1898 in what became Kountze Park

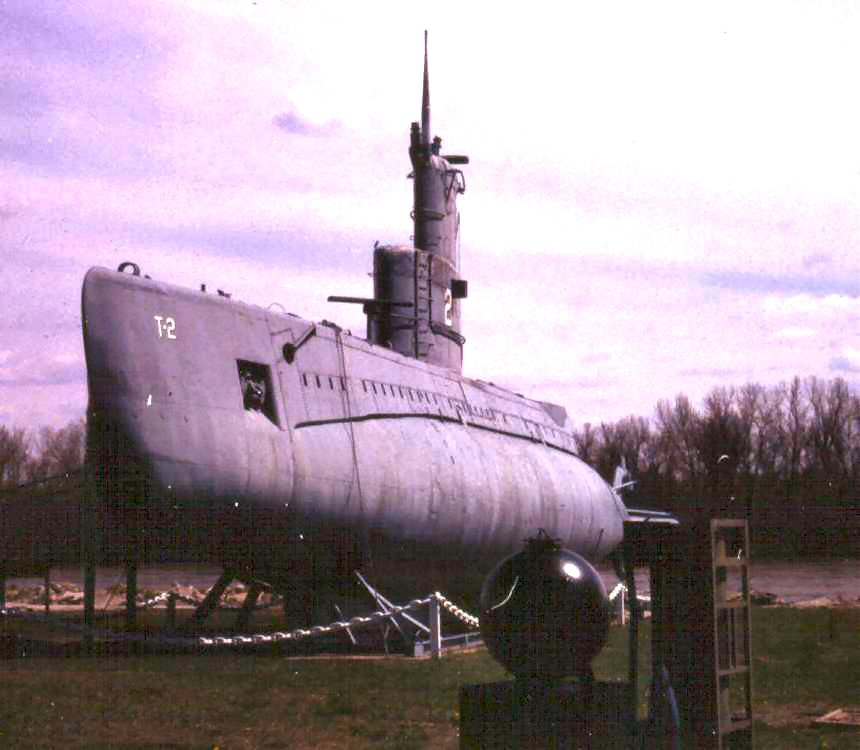
The USS Marlin at Freedom Park

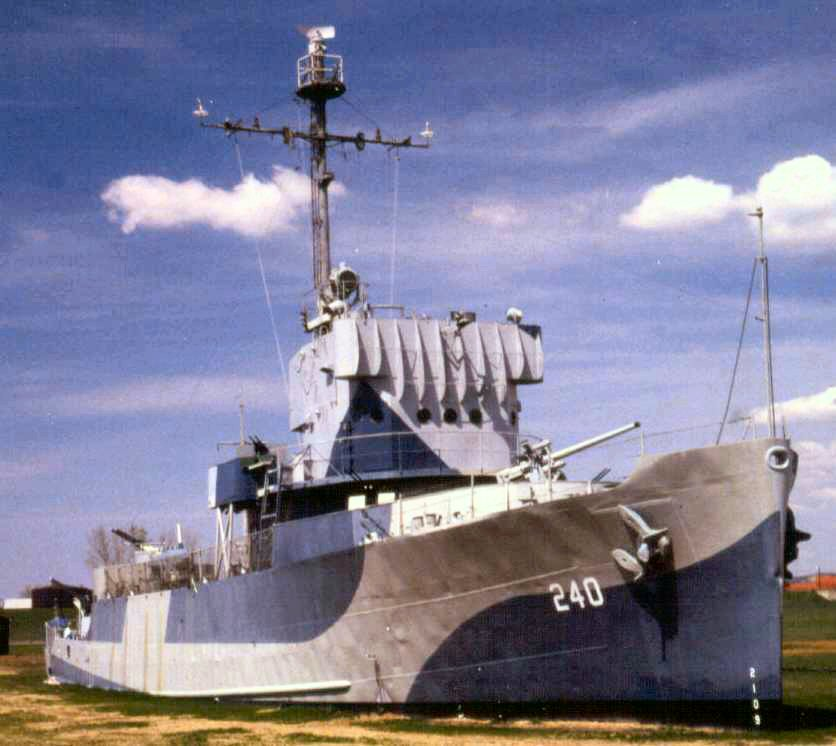
The USS Hazard, also at Freedom Park

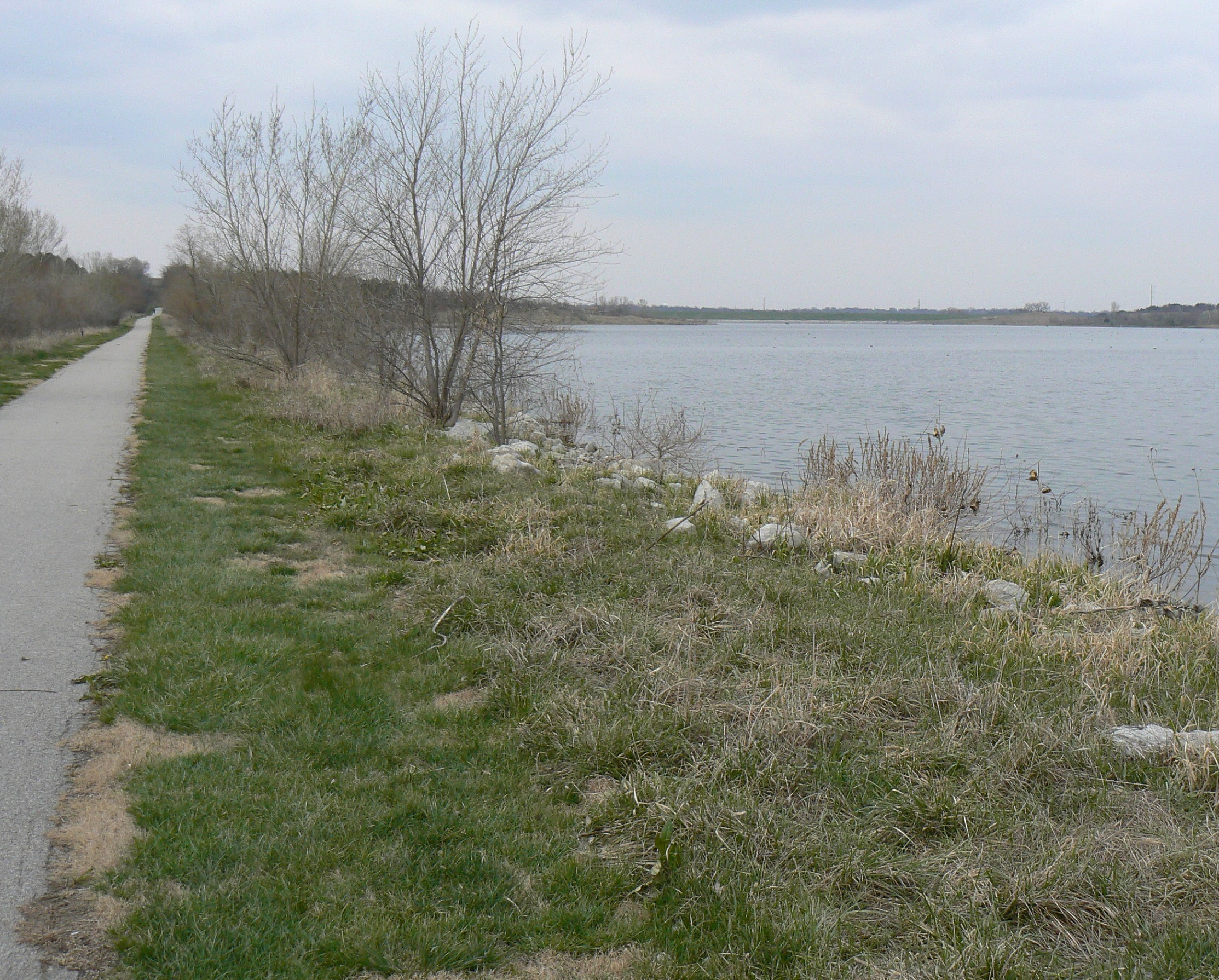
A trail at Wehrspann Lake in southwest Omaha

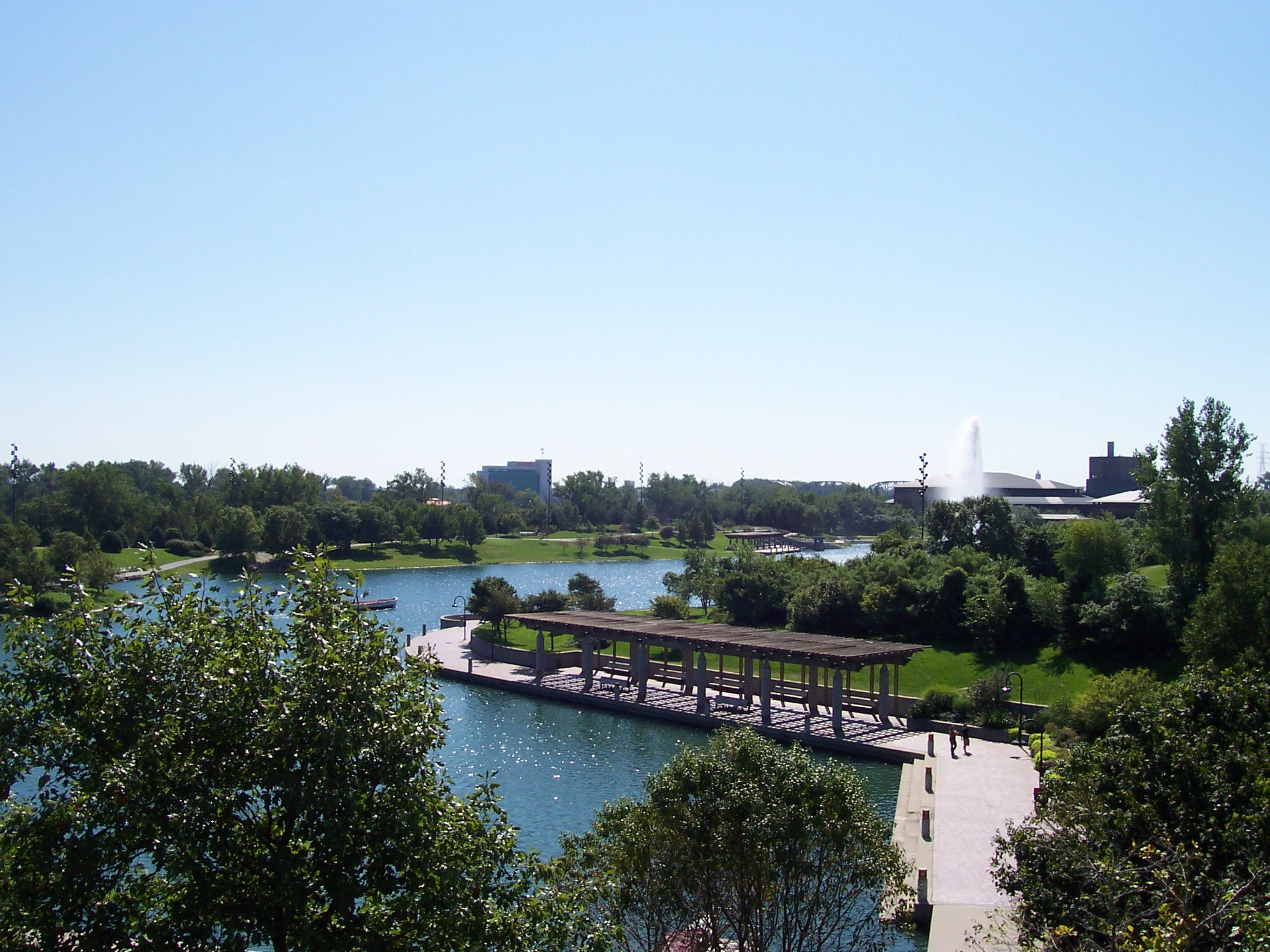
Heartland of America Park, looking south

Parks in Omaha (alphabetical)
Name	Location	Notes
22nd and Willis Park		
Adams Park	3121 Bedford Avenue	Created in 1960, this park includes a playground, picnic area, an overlook, paths, restrooms, and open space. There are also ball fields, tennis courts and an outdoor tournament-quality basketball complex with glass backboards, scoreboards and fan seating.
Albright Park		
Andersen Park	134th and Cottner streets, Millard	
Applewood Heights Park		
Armbrust Park		
Athletic Park		
Autumn Heights Park		
Barrington Park, Omaha	764 N. 164th Street	
Bay Meadows Park		
Bedford Place Park		
Bemis Park	3434 Cuming Street	Founded in 1891, this park includes 10 acres (40,000 m^{2}) with a playground, tennis courts, walking paths, picnic area and shelter located in the Bemis Park Landmark Heritage District.
Benson Lions Park	2005 North 66th Street	2 acres (8,100 m^{2}) with a playground and ball field
Benson Park	7002 Military Avenue	Created in 1931, this 200 acres (0.81 km^{2}) park offers a playground, football and soccer fields, horseshoe pits, basketball and tennis courts, fishing, walking paths, indoor ice rink, lagoon, and a pavilion.
Bent Creek Park		
Bluestem Prairie Preserve		
Bluff View Park		
Bowling Green Park	7065 Blondo Street	7 acres (28,000 m^{2}) with a playground, ball field, basketball court, football field and walking trails
Boyd Park	4201 North 16th Street	Location of Omaha Central High School's baseball field
Brookside Park	2310 S. 105th Ave.	
Brown Park		
Bryan Park		
Cancer Survivor Park	1111 S. 105th St.	
Candlewood II		
Carol Gast Memorial Park	3501 Ames Avenue	Located next to Butler-Gast YMCA
Levi Carter Park	3100 Abbott Drive	Carter Lake has opportunities for water skiing, fishing and boating. The park has baseball fields, football fields, and basketball courts, as well as paths, picnic areas, shelters, restrooms, a pavilion and open space. It was founded in 1891.
Christie Heights Park		
Churchich Park	50th and C streets	
Clarkson Park		
Cody Park		
Colonial Acres Park		
Columbus Park		
Conagra Park		
Conestoga Park		
Conoco Park		
Cottonwood Heights Park		
Cottonwood Park	728 S. 154th st	Paved walking and biking paths, playground, basketball courts
Country Club Manor Park		
Crosskey Villages Park		
Cuming Corner Park		
Deer Hollow Park		
Democracy Park		
Dewey Park		
Discovery Park		
Discovery Soccer Complex		
Dorothy Patach Park		
Dodge Park	11001 John J. Pershing Drive	This park offers fishing, water skiing and boating on the Missouri River, as well as hiking, Baseball fields, soccer fields, horseshoe pits, tennis courts, a cricket field, a picnic area, pavilions, historical monuments and a campground. It was founded in 1930.
Elmwood Park	802 S. 60th Street, adjacent to the University of Nebraska at Omaha	Created in 1889, this park has many walking and running trails and an 18-hole golf course.
Englewood Park		
Erskine Park		
Escalante Hills Park		
Essex Park		
Esther Pilster Park	4088 North 88th Avenue	The park is named after Esther Pilster, a former Omaha Public Schools principal and philanthropist. It has a playground, a ballfield, a soccer field, trails, shelters, and a picnic area.
Eugene T. Mahoney State Park		This park offers hiking, tennis courts, a disc golf course, and horse riding trails.
Faye Boulevard Park		
Filmore Park		
Florence Park	3015 State Street	Located in historic Florence, this park is 2.6 acres (11,000 m^{2}) and includes a playground, walking paths, a historical monument and a shelter area.
Fontenelle Park	4575 Ames Avenue	Founded in 1893, currently has 108 acres (0.44 km^{2}) with a lagoon, playground and paths, basketball courts, tennis courts, football fields, and a nine-hole golf course.
Forest Lawn Park		
Freedom Park	2497 Freedom Park Road	Home of the Nebraska Cricket Club, USS Hazard and the USS Marlin
Gallagher Park	2936 North 52nd Street	18 acres (73,000 m^{2}), including a playground, ball fields, a swimming pool and a historical monument to the former Krug Park
Grace Young Park	6317 Military Avenue	2.4 acres (9,700 m^{2}), including a playground, ball field and basketball court
Gene Leahy Mall	1001 Douglas Street	Recently renovated and opened to the public in 2022, site redevelopment added new and revitalized features including green space, playground, sculpture garden, and a dog park
Gifford Park		
Gifford River Drive Park		
Glenn Cunningham Lake	8660 Lake Cunningham Road	Founded in 1977. This park offers hiking and biking trails, camping grounds, and a disc golf course.
Grace Young Park		
Graham Park		
Greentree Park		
H.H. Harper Park		
Hanscom Park	1899 South 32nd Avenue	Founded in 1889. This park has basketball courts, a dog park, tennis courts, and a disc golf course.
Harrison Heights Park		
Harvey Oaks Park		
Hawthorne Park	S 177th St	
Heartland of America Park		
Hefflinger Park		
Highland Park	2512 D Street	
Hillsborough Park		
Hillside Little League Park		
Himebaugh Park		
Hitchcock Park		
Hummel Park	11808 John J. Pershing Drive	Created in 1930, this park is 202 acres (0.82 km^{2}), including a historical monument for Fort Lisa.
James F. Lynch Park		
John P. Munnelly Park		This park was named in 1990 after former State Senator John P. Munnelly
Karen Park		
Kenefick Park	100 Bancroft Street (next to the Lauritzen Gardens)	
Kellom Greenbelt Park		
Kellom Park	2310 Nicholas Street	6-acre (24,000 m^{2})
Keystone Park		
Kingswood Park		
Kiwanis Park		
Kountze Park	1920 Pinkney Street	10 acres (40,000 m^{2}), including a playground, ball field, basketball courts, tennis courts, a community center, shelter area and restrooms
Lake Forest Estates Park		
Lake Forest Park		
Lake James Park		
Lamp Park		
Lawrence Youngman Lake	192nd and West Dodge Road	Includes a lake, picnic area, playground, fishing, and no-wake boating
Leavenworth Park		
Lee Valley Park		
Lewis & Clark Landing		
Little Elmwood Park		
Kenifick Park	100 Bancroft Avenue	
Mandan Park		
Maple Village Park		
McKinley Park		
Meadow Lane Park		This park has walking trails, tennis courts, and pickleball courts.
Memorial Park	6008 Underwood Avenue	This park was created in 1948 as a memorial for Douglas County's citizens who have served in the armed forces.
Mercer Park		
Metcalfe Park	1700 Country Club Avenue	3.1 acres, playground, trails, open space, named for former mayor of Omaha, Richard Lee Metcalfe
Miami Playground		
Michael Thell NEA Park		
Miguel Keith Park		
Millard Heights Park		
Millard Highlands Park		
Miller Park	6201 North 30th Street	Founded in 1891, the park includes a lake, artesian well fountain, golf course, trails, picnic areas, pavilion, playground, baseball fields, pickleball courts, and soccer fields.
Miller's Landing Park		
Mockingbird Heights Park		
Montclair/Westbrook Park		
Morton Park		
Mount Vernon Garden		
Myott Park		
Neale Woods	14323 Edith Marie Avenue	600-acre nature preserve; prairie and forest hiking trails; Millard Observatory (astronomy); operated by Fontenelle Forest
North Oaks Park		
Northwest Park		
Norwick Park		
Oak Heights Park		
Oakbrook Park		
Oaks Park, Omaha		
Omaha Botanical Gardens (aka Lauritzen Gardens)	2001 South 6th Street	1982
One Pacific Place Park		
Orchard Park		
Pacific Meadows Park		
Palomino Hills Park		
Park East Park		
Parkside Park		
Peterson Park		
Pheasant Run Park		
Pinewood Park		
Pioneer Courage Park	14th Street and Capitol Avenue	Location of a Pioneer Courage sculpture depicting a wagon train leaving Omaha heading into the west.
Pipal Park	7802 Hascall St	
Prairie Lane Park		
Pulaski Park		
Rambleridge Park	11424 Fort Street	
Raven Oaks Park	7901 Raven Oaks Drive	
Regency Park		
Ridgefield Park		
Riverview Park		
Roanoke Park		
Rock Glen Park		
Rockbrook Park		
Roxbury Park		
Ruser's Park	53rd and Center Street	Privately owned German Summer Garden, with shooting range, athletic fields, bowling, picnic area and dance hall.
Saddle Hills Park		
Sandoz Park		
Schroeder-Vogel Park		
Seymour Smith Park	6802 Harrison Street	Founded in 1962, this park has a skeet range, baseball fields, playground, pavilion, tennis courts, and Omaha's most popular disc golf course.
Signal Hill Park		
Somerset Park	Wenninghoff Road and North 86th Street	1994
Spaulding Park		
Spring Lake Park		
Standing Bear Lake	6404 N. 132nd st	1977
Stillmeadow Park		
Storz Rugby Complex	North 16th and Storz Expressway	
Sunny Slope Park		
Swanson Park		
Templeton Mini-Park		
Timber Creek Park		
Tomahawk Hills Park		
Towl Park		
Tranquility Park		
Trendwood Park		
Turner Park		
Unity Park		
Upland Park		
Walnut Grove Park		This park offers a playground, walking and running trails, and has hosted temporary disc golf courses for disc golf tournaments.
Walnut Hill Park		
Wentworth Park		
West Fairacres Park		
Westchester Park		
Western Trails Park		
Westgate Park		
Westroads Parkway		
Westwood Heights Park		
Woodhaven Park		
Yale Park	3377 Lake street	
Young Park	411½ N. Elmwood Road	
Youngman Connector Park	163rd and Farnam Streets	
Zorinsky Lake Park	156th and F streets	Created in 1993, this park includes over seven miles of paved trails, biking, fishing, boating, playgrounds, covered seating, public restrooms, and soccer fields.

== See also ==
- List of cemeteries in Omaha
- Culture in Omaha
- Sports in Omaha
