= Adams Park (Omaha, Nebraska) =

Municipal park in Omaha, Nebraska

Coordinates: 41.286073°N 95.9581464°W

- Interactive map of Adams Park
- Type: Municipal (Omaha)
- Location: North Omaha
- Area: 61 acres (250,000 m^{2})
- Created: 1948
- Open: All year

Adams Park is located at 3121 Bedford Avenue in North Omaha, Nebraska. The community surrounding the park recently became the focus of urban planning by the Omaha Chamber of Commerce to promote redevelopment in the area.

== History ==
The Omaha Park Commission bought 60 acres (240,000 m^{2}) of land along the John A. Creighton Boulevard at 30th & Bedford in 1948. First called Bedford Park, it was renamed in 1954 as Adams Park in honor of local businessman and parks enthusiast Frederick J. Adams. In 1989 many of the park's facilities were added, and in 2000 the city constructed a pond, named in honor of actress and Omaha native Gabrielle Union.

== About ==
The park has 60 acres (240,000 m^{2}), with a playground, a picnic area, an overlook, paths, restrooms, and open space. There are ball fields, a football field, tennis courts and an outdoor tournament-quality basketball complex with glass backboards, scoreboards and fan seating. The park is also the location of the Adams Park Community Center. Walking has also become popular at the park since the lagoon was established, and a number of trails and sidewalks weaving throughout the park.

Bordering the Omaha View, Highlander, and Clifton Hill neighborhoods, Adams Park is bisected by the John A. Creighton Boulevard, part of Omaha's historic boulevard system. It also neighbors Howard Kennedy School and Hope Lutheran Church, a historic African American congregation listed on the National Register of Historic Places. It also borders the Malcolm X Memorial Foundation, which provides amenities enhancing the historic and cultural features of the area.

A disc golf tournament was held at the park in 2006 to support developing a new course there. Tournaments have been held there since.

In 2007, the park was the focus of new urban planning efforts designed to make the area a "new central gathering place with new and renovated houses concentrated near 30th Street and Bedford Avenue and 30th and Lake Streets."

As of 2023, it continues to be central in the community.

== See also ==
- Parks in Omaha
