= Brown Park =

Park in South Omaha, Nebraska

- Interactive map of Brown Park
- Type: Municipal (Omaha)
- Location: South Omaha
- Coordinates: 41°12′04″N 95°56′14″W
- Area: 12 acres (49,000 m^{2})
- Created: 1891
- Status: Open all year

Brown Park is located at 5708 South 15th Street in the Brown Park neighborhood of South Omaha, Nebraska. The baseball field at the park is more than 100 years old, and hosted games played by Ty Cobb and others.

== History ==
Brown Park is a historic park operated by the City of Omaha. The park is named for the former farmer whose land was purchased by the city in the 1910s to be turned into the park and baseball field. Babe Ruth and Lou Gehrig did not play here, but at nearby League Park at 15th & Vinton, in a barnstorming tour in 1927.

=== Baseball ===
The Brown Park baseball diamond is the home field for the Omaha South High School baseball team. A team sponsored by the Fraternal Order of Police Lodge #1 in Omaha plays baseball for the Nebraska Reserve Baseball League with Brown Park as their home, as well. The field was recently renovated by the City of Omaha and renamed the John Stella Field at Brown Park to honor a long time South Omaha baseball booster. Stella coached the South High School team from 1985 through the 2001 season and has been an American Legion coach since 1982. In 2019, a Field Turf infield was added, and the outfield Field Turf is set to be completed in spring 2020. Since 2018, Brown Park has also been the home field for the Bellevue University Bruins baseball team.

== Pavilion ==
A historical building dating to the 1910s, the Brown Park Pavilion is 700 square feet and has a small stage, with an additional wraparound porch.

== See also ==
- Parks in Omaha
