= Hitchcock Park =

Park in Omaha, Nebraska, United States

Coordinates: 41°12′30″N 95°58′45″W

Hitchcock Park is a public park located at 4220 "Q" Street in South Omaha, Nebraska. The park is regarded as a "popular South Omaha spot," along with the Henry Doorly Zoo and Rosenblatt Stadium. Due to a settlement between the U.S. Government and the City of Omaha, the park is subject to all enforcements of the Americans with Disabilities Act. The park is the location of one of three 50-meter pools in Omaha. It has also been identified as one of the many parks in Omaha poisoned with lead by the former ASARCO smelter in Downtown Omaha.

== History ==
In 1946 Omaha's Parks and Recreation Commission purchased 38 acres (15 ha) of land, and spent over $91,000 of bond money to develop the park over the next 10 years. Early features included a softball and baseball diamonds, as well as a lagoon for skating. In 1956 Hitchcock Park was named for former Senator and founder of the Omaha World-Herald, Gilbert M. Hitchcock.

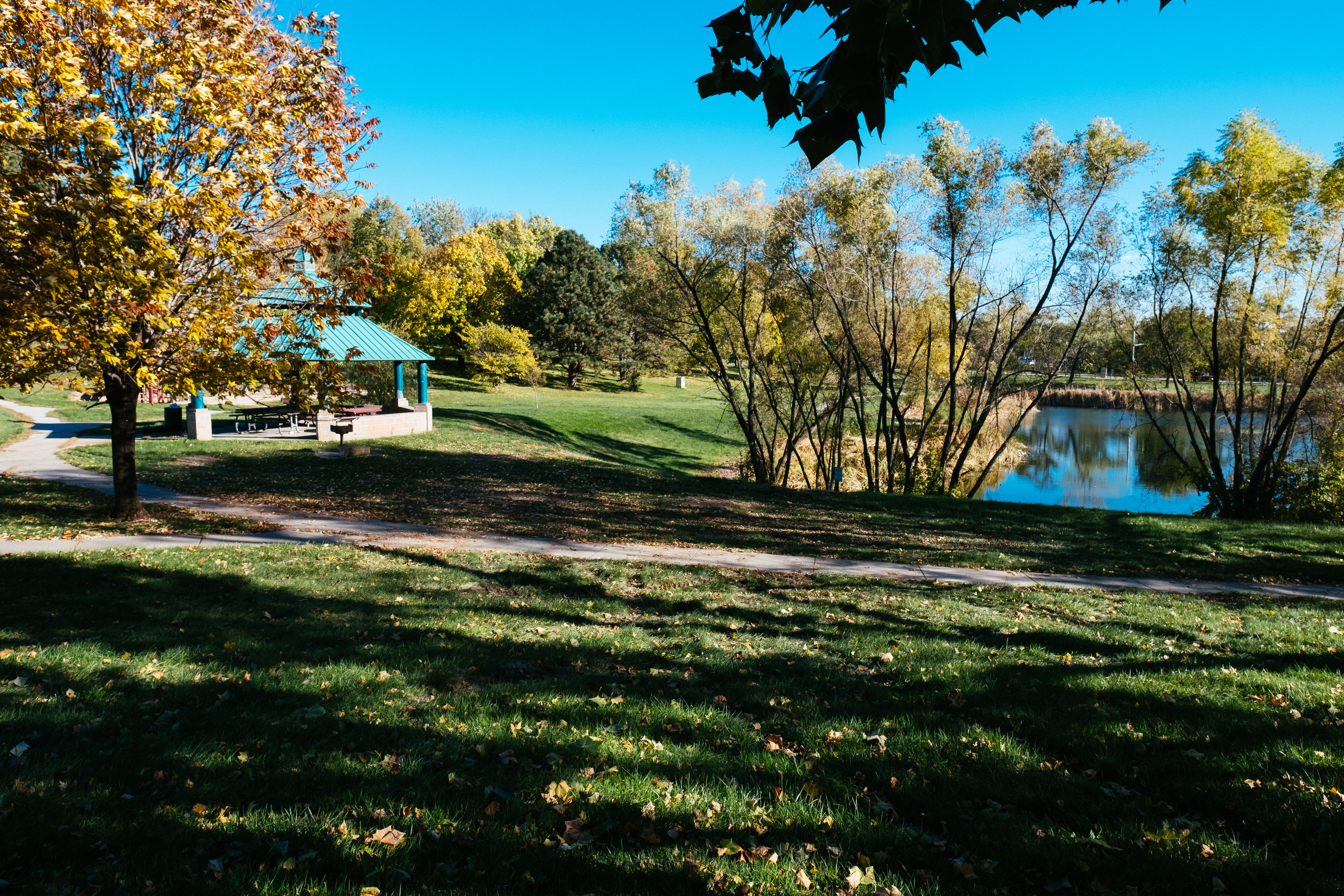
Hitchcock Park Pond

A major renovation of Hitchcock Park happened in 1999 and 2000. A lagoon renovation, parking improvements, a new playground, a new picnic shelter, and expanded walking paths were among the improvements.

== Motto McLean Ice Arena ==
The McLean Ice Arena is a multi-purpose facility located in Hitchcock Park that is open to the public and operates throughout the year. The Arena is named after E.H. Motto McLean, who is cited as the founder of youth hockey in Omaha. The arena includes a standard ice rink, a state-of-the-art lighting and ceiling system, four locker rooms and a lobby area. There is also a seated viewing area, a meeting room, a full-service concession and bleacher seating for 800 people.

== See also ==
- Parks in Omaha, Nebraska
