= Fontenelle Park =

Public park in North Omaha, Nebraska

- Interactive map of Fontenelle Park
- Type: Municipal (Omaha)
- Location: North Omaha
- Coordinates: 41.297°N 95.982°W
- Area: 108 acres (0.44 km^{2})
- Created: 1893
- Open: All year

Fontenelle Park is a 108-acre (0.44 km^{2}) public park located at 4575 Ames Avenue, at an intersection of Fontenelle Boulevard in North Omaha, Nebraska. In the late 1940s, the park made headlines across the Midwestern United States as the possible home of a minor league baseball team.

== History ==
Land for the park was acquired in 1893 in accordance with a grand parks and boulevards schema for Omaha planned by Horace Cleveland in 1891. The Fontenelle Boulevard was also part of this plan. Despite the support of prominent Omahans like Harold Gifford, there were immediate protests from city residents who felt the park land was located too far from the city. Due to lack of funds and criticism, it remained essentially prairie grass for another decade until city growth expanding northwest from Downtown Omaha created demand for improvement.

In 1911 the park was graded, loads were built and the golf course was laid out. By 1916 it was one of the most popular and best-patronized-parks in the city.

Omaha hosted the American Legion World Series in 1939 at Fontenelle Park, where local favorites Creighton Prep won the championship over a team from Berwyn, Illinois. In 1947 John Rosenblatt explored the park as the possible location for the city's new Triple-A minor league baseball team. However, neighborhood opposition forced the city to look elsewhere, and the stadium ended up in Deer Park, where it eventually hosted the Omaha Royals and was named Rosenblatt Stadium in honor of its advocate.

In 1998 a major rehabilitation of the park was completed that included a renovation of the park’s lagoon, a new playground, ball field improvements and installation of improved walkways. The park pavilion was also fully renovated.

== Modern facilities ==
Today Fontenelle Park has a popular lagoon, a playground, and long, meandering paths function as terrific ways to exercise. Two basketball courts, four tennis courts, and two football fields join a nine-hole golf course to host sports throughout the park. The park pavilion currently houses the Joe Edmondson YMCA. The golf course is one of the oldest in the Omaha area, sprawling over hillsides and nestling within a wide, shallow valley. Numerous maple and pine trees line the perimeter of the course, and a large, duck-filled pond is in the center of the course.

Recently the Omaha North High School Vikings baseball team renovated the baseball fields, and today they are popular for their tidiness, appearance, and usage.

== See also ==
- Parks in Omaha
- Boulevards in Omaha
