= Zorinsky Lake Park =

Park in West Omaha, Nebraska

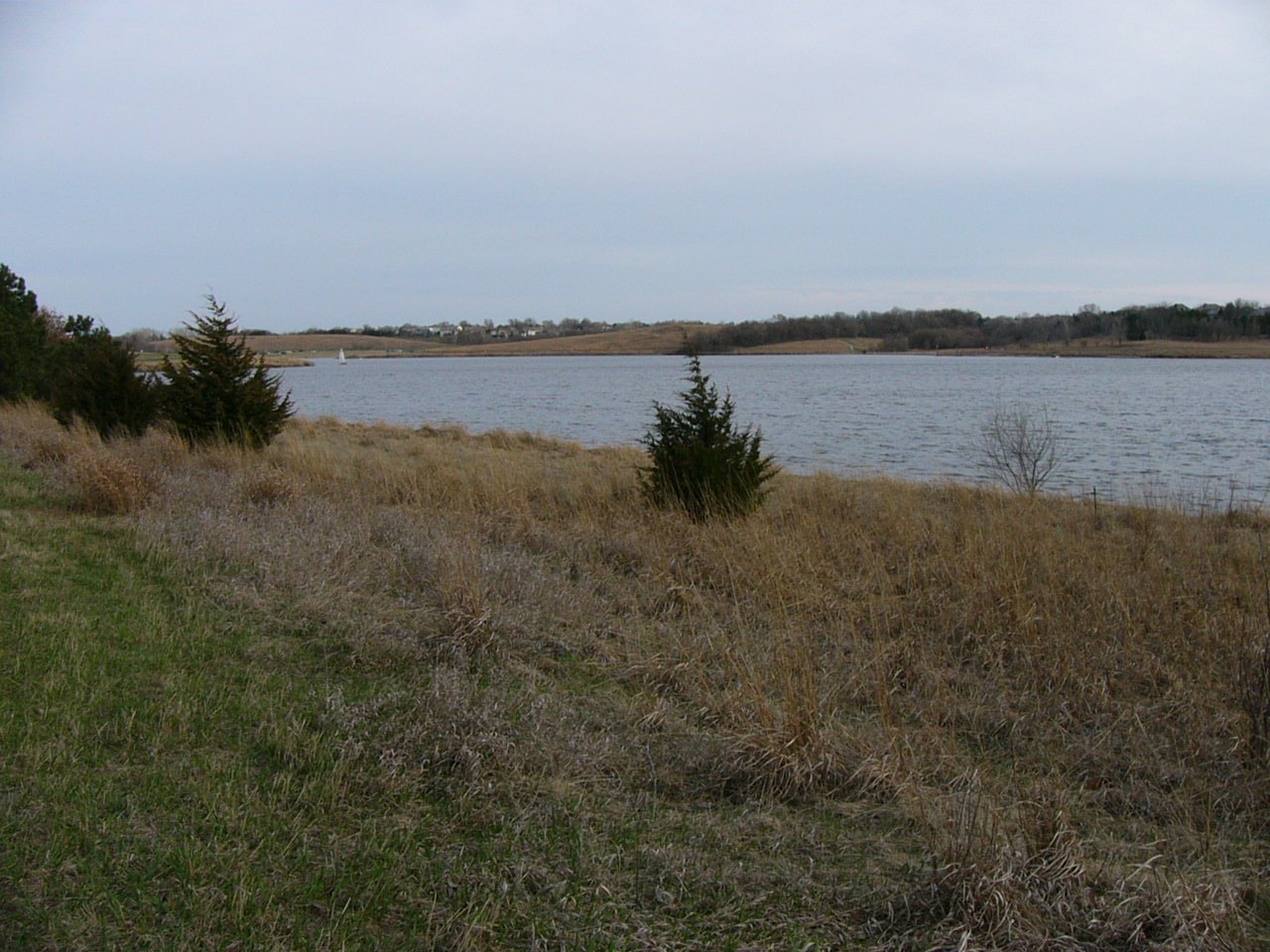
- View toward dam from north side of lake
- Interactive map of Zorinsky Lake Park
- Type: Regional
- Location: West Omaha
- Coordinates: 41°13′08″N 96°10′02″W
- Area: 1,023.6 acres (414.2 ha)
- Created: 1993
- Operator: City of Omaha
- Status: Open all year

Zorinsky Lake Park is a park located at 156th and F streets in West Omaha, Nebraska. Named after Senator Edward Zorinsky of Omaha, the park has a 255-acre (103 ha) lake offering boating and fishing. The park is surrounded by 770 acres (310 ha) of public land, including 190 acres (77 ha) dedicated to wildlife management. The park is home to the Bauermeister prairie, which houses 120 species of plants, birds, and wildlife.

== About ==
In response to damaging floods in 1964 and 1965, several dams were constructed on Papillion (Papio) Creek and its tributaries for flood control. In 1984, the reservoir was completed, and then the dam structure was closed in 1989. Zorinsky Lake Park opened in 1993 after the US Army Corps of Engineers leased the land to the City of Omaha. The Park was named after the late U.S. Senator Edward Zorinsky. The park includes two playgrounds, several playing fields and multiple picnic areas. Tree-lined trails running through Zorinsky Lake encompass the perimeter of the lake. The small lake is approximately 3.15 miles (5.07 km) and the big lake is 4.44 miles (7.15 km) around. It is 7.4 miles (11.9 km) around the both lakes. The path is marked every tenth of the mile with green markers to give the location around the lake.

The park hours are from 5:00 a.m. to 11:00 p.m. 7 days a week. The lake has a surface area of 255 acres (103 ha) and is a day-use facility offering two modern playgrounds, baseball diamonds, soccer fields, a football field, hiking and bicycling trails, and a universally accessible fishing dock. According to the Nebraska Game and Park Commission, Zorinsky Lake was stocked with 79 largemouth bass on April 16, 2009 and 38,000 walleye on June 10, 2009. The maximum speed limit on the lake is 5 mph (8.0 km/h) and there is no-wake boating permitted. The boat ramp is located on the east side of the lake and can be accessed from 156th and f Street.

In November 2010, a local Boy Scout found a zebra mussel attached to a beer can at the edge of the lake. In an attempt to eradicate the invasive mollusk, the lake was partially drained in the winter of 2010–11, lowering its level by 17.5 feet (5.3 m): it was thought that removing the water and exposing the mussels to sub-freezing air temperatures would kill them off.

== See also ==
- Parks in Omaha, Nebraska
- Trails in Omaha
