= Omaha City Hall =

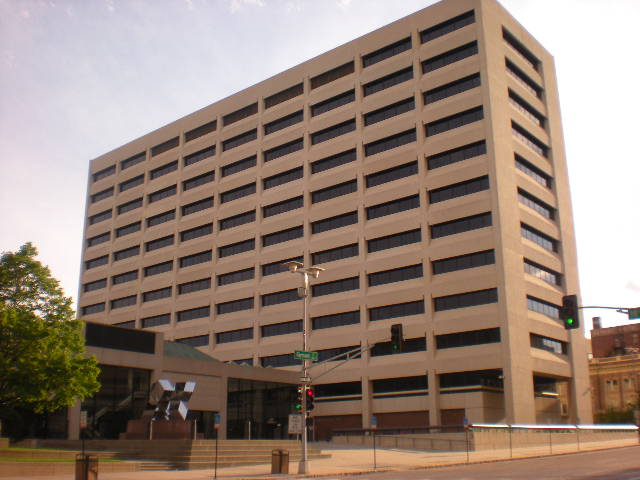
- Omaha's City Offices Building in downtown.
- Interactive map of the Omaha City Hall area

General information
- Location: Omaha, Nebraska, United States
- Coordinates: 41°15′25″N 95°56′26″W
- Construction started: 1917
- Completed: 1917

Omaha City Hall is located at 1819 Farnam Street in downtown Omaha, Nebraska. It is the seat of government for the City of Omaha.

== Omaha's Old City Hall ==
Omaha's most notable city hall was built in 1890 at the corner of 18th and Farnam Streets in downtown Omaha. Called the "Red Castle" due to its materials and grand architecture, the old city hall was a significant part of the city's past. A spectacular Victorian-style building, its lower floors were built of granite with the upper floors in red sandstone. The building featured solid oak interiors, an ornate city council chamber with a large brass chandelier, and murals throughout. The building had a clock tower that rose nearly 20 stories, making it a substantial landmark throughout the entire city.

The original facade of the building was destroyed by a poor renovation in 1950, and in 1962 the building was classified as dangerous. In 1966, it demolished to make way for the Woodmen Tower. Along with the demolition of the old post office in Omaha, the destruction of the building was extremely controversial and became a focal point for a historic preservation movement to emerge in Omaha. This led to more deliberate preservation efforts by city leaders and the community.

== Omaha/Douglas Civic Center ==
When it was opened in 1966, the current Omaha city hall is officially part of the "Omaha/Douglas Civic Center." Housing both city and county functions, the specific City Offices Building is where the Mayor and offices as well as the chamber for the Omaha City Council are located.

Located at 1819 Farnam Street, the current building was actually built around 1917. This is significantly older than the 1966 demolition date of the old City Hall. The city government moved into this building after deciding to sell and demolish the older Red Castle." Rebuilt as a modern office building in 1966, the current building is a functional municipal structure. With spaces for the mayor's offices (aka the "Mayor's Floor"), the building also houses the Omaha City Council Chambers and various administrative offices for departments including the Omaha City Clerk, Finance, Human Resources, Human Rights and Relations, Law, and others.

The Civic Center is located directly across the street from the Douglas County Courthouse, creating a concentrated center for local government and administration in downtown Omaha. The current facility is designed for the modern needs of a large city government, emphasizing space and efficiency over the historic design of the "Red Castle" it replaced as the seat of power.

Co-housed with the City offices, the Omaha Children's Museum opened in the civic center in 1979 and only later moved to its own facility.

== Facility Future ==
In 2022, the Omaha/Douglas County Building Commission hired HDR in Omaha, to conduct a surveying project on current and future "operational performance and effiency inside the Omaha/Douglas Civic Center."

As of 2025, there are no official, funded plans or active construction for a new City Hall building in Omaha. However, there is definitely ongoing conversation and planning regarding the entire downtown governmental complex. According to projections mentioned earlier, the Douglas County Courthouse will outgrow its current facilities in 2035, and it is part of the Omaha/Douglas Civic Center. Current public conversations focus on the future of the entire campus including the City Hall section. Proposed solutions include building a new standalone county courts center, vacating the historic Douglas County Courthouse entirely to build a new, larger combined center on its site, and then repurposing or selling the old courthouse. There are no current public plans to pursue any of these options.

== See also ==
- History of Omaha, Nebraska
