= Timeline of Omaha, Nebraska history =

Significant events in the history of Omaha, Nebraska, include social, political, cultural, and economic activities.

== Pre-1854 ==
- Pre-19th century Bands from the Pawnee, Otoe and Sioux nations alternatively occupy the land now comprising Omaha as hunting area.
- Early 19th century Omaha nation uses the land now comprising Omaha as hunting area.
- 1804 Between August 3 and August 20, the Lewis and Clark Expedition traveled along the banks of the Missouri and camped in North Omaha near Dodge Park.
- 1812 Manuel Lisa builds Fort Lisa north of Omaha and helps sway local tribes to support the US in the War of 1812.
- 1819 The first steamboat to ply Nebraskan waters, the Western Engineer, arrives at Fort Lisa.
- 1824 Cabanne's Trading Post established in far North Omaha for the American Fur Company owned by John Jacob Astor.
- 1825 T. B. Roye (or Royce) established a trading post in the Omaha area.
- 1846 Winter Quarters established in present-day Florence as a hold-over of the Church of Jesus Christ of Latter-day Saints on their way from Nauvoo to Utah. 359 die and are buried in what is now called the Mormon Pioneer Cemetery. This area was the first city in the Nebraska Territory, called Culter's Park by its 2500 residents. Although it only existed for two years, the city had a mayor and city council, 24 policemen and fireguards, various administrative committees, and a town square for public meetings.

== 1854–99 ==
- 1853 Hadley D. Johnson chosen delegate to Congress by an election held at Bellevue, with instructions to work for the establishment of a new territory west of the Missouri.
- 1854 A treaty with the chiefs of the Omaha was negotiated, by which that tribe ceded the land now comprising Omaha to the United States.
- 1854 Nebraska Territory is organized under the Nebraska-Kansas Act on May 30, 1854.
- 1854 The Council Bluffs and Nebraska Ferry Company hired Council Bluffs surveyor Alfred D. Jones to survey Omaha City. The original town plat consisted of 320 blocks, each 264 feet square. All the streets were made 100 feet in width, except for Capitol Avenue and Twenty-First Street, which were 120 feet wide.
- 1854 Speculators from Council Bluffs celebrate Fourth of July with a picnic on the future "Capitol Hill" in Omaha.
- 1854 The first house in Omaha was commenced by Thomas Allen for the Council Bluffs and Nebraska Ferry Company. When completed it was called the St. Nicholas House and was conducted as a hotel by William P. Snowden and his wife.
- 1854 Jones is appointed the first postmaster of Omaha, and hands out mail from his hat.
- 1854 Birth of the first non-Native American child in Omaha, a daughter of James Ferry and his wife.
- 1854 First issue of the Omaha Arrow, the first newspaper published in the city.
- 1854 A claim club called the Omaha Township Claim Association was organized by the settlers to protect their titles.
- 1855 The first session of the Territorial Legislature was convened at Omaha.
- 1855 Acting Governor Cuming approved the bill locating the territorial seat of government at Omaha.
- 1855 Scriptown is platted for legislators in the Nebraska Territorial Legislature.
- 1855 On January 18 the First Nebraska Territorial Legislature was held in Omaha on Ninth Street between Farnam and Douglas.
- 1855 The first school taught in Omaha begins on July 1, 1855 with 40 students.
- 1856 The first photographic studio located in Omaha is opened.
- 1856 The town of Saratoga is founded within the boundaries of present-day North Omaha.
- 1856 Prospect Hill Cemetery was set out in a plat by Moses F. Shinn.
- 1856 East Omaha is informally annexed to Omaha.
- 1857 The act of the Legislature incorporating Omaha City was approved by the governor.
- 1857 Sarpy County was cut off from Douglas by an act of the Nebraska Territorial Legislature.
- 1857 The City of Omaha is incorporated.
- 1857 First meeting of the Omaha City Council occurs.
- 1857 The first steps were taken toward the organization of the Omaha Fire Department.
- 1858 Part of both houses of the Legislature, then in session at Omaha, voted to adjourn to Florence.
- 1858 The burial of A. F. Salisbury in Prospect Hill Cemetery marks the first official burial there.
- 1859 The county commissioners purchased a tract for the Douglas County Poor Farm.
- 1860 Omaha connected for the first time with the outside world by telegraph.
- 1863 President Abraham Lincoln issued his order fixing the eastern terminus of the Union Pacific Railroad at Omaha.
- 1863 Brownell Hall is founded at the location of present-day North 24th and Grand Streets.
- 1863 The Storz Brewery is founded in Saratoga along North 16th Street.
- 1866 The Omaha Police Department was organized.
- 1867 Act of the Legislature locating the State Institute for the Deaf and Dumb at Omaha approved the governor.
- 1867 Gov. David Butler approved the act of the Legislature removing the state capital to Lincoln.
- 1867 Nebraska is admitted into the Union as a state.
- 1868 Nebraska's first high school graduates come from Brownell Hall in North Omaha.
- 1868 The Sherman Barracks are built in the location of present-day North Omaha.
- 1869 The old territorial capitol building given to the City of Omaha for a high school.
- 1870 Omaha was made a port of entry by an act of Congress and S. A. Orchard was appointed the first surveyor of customs.
- 1871 Name of the post office changed from "Omaha City" to "Omaha."
- 1871 The first meat packing establishment in Omaha opened by David Cook.
- 1872 The first train crossed the Union Pacific Missouri River Bridge.
- 1872 First observation of Arbor Day in Nebraska.
- 1872 The Omaha Public Library was opened.
- 1875 The Omaha Fire Department was formed and professional fire fighters were employed.
- 1876 Creighton University was founded.
- 1877 The Saratoga Bend is "cut off" from the Missouri River by a flood, forming what originally called Cutoff Lake. Vacation cabins on the east side of the lake eventually become the town of Carter Lake, Iowa.
- 1877 The outbreak of a railroad labor riot led to General Sheridan suggesting the stationing of a permanent garrison in Omaha.
- 1878 The Sherman Barracks are made permanent, strengthened, and renamed Fort Omaha by the US government.
- 1878 A vigilante committee of 150 members was organized at Omaha "to suppress crime."
- 1879 The habeas corpus case of Standing Bear, a Ponca chief, and several members of his band was begun in the United States District Court at Omaha and attracted widespread attention.
- 1879 The first telephone exchange in Omaha was opened.
- 1880 700 men at the Omaha Smelter Works protest, threatening state militia in Downtown Omaha.
- 1881 The Omaha Medical College was incorporated.
- 1882 The first asphalt pavement in Omaha was laid on Douglas Street, from Fourteenth to Sixteenth streets.
- 1882 The first asphalt pavement in Omaha was laid on Douglas Street from 14th to 16th Streets.
- 1882 The Camp Dump Strikers are meant by soldiers from Fort Omaha.
- 1883 Buffalo Bill founds the Wild West, Rocky Mountain and Prairie Exhibition in Omaha.
- 1883 Omaha connected by telephone with Lincoln and Plattsmouth.
- 1883 The Omaha Union Stock Yards Company was organized.
- 1885 Gilbert Hitchcock founded the Omaha World-Herald.
- 1891 African American George Smith lynched in Omaha for "leering at a white woman."
- 1891 500 workers attack the ASARCO plant in downtown.
- 1892 The John A. Creighton Medical College (the Medical Department of Creighton University) was founded.
- 1893 The East Omaha Bridge is opened.
- 1894 The River Park Zoo opened, later renamed Henry Doorly Zoo.
- 1894 Kelly's Army, a group of 2,000 homeless men, storms Omaha's Union Rail Yards for supplies.
- 1894 A general strike in the Omaha meatpacking industry lasted more than a month.
- 1895 A Polish Catholic church in South Omaha is fought over by the church and the parishioners, leading to a gun battle. The church is closed and demolished by the local diocese.
- 1898 The Trans-Mississippi Exposition was held in Omaha from June 1 to October 31, 1898. Its ornate grounds were created to highlight the economic, cultural and artistic achievements of the individuals who lived in the Midwest. All of the buildings, which housed over 5000 exhibits, were built as temporary structures. Today there is a monument in North Omaha's Kountze Park, the former site of the exposition.
- 1899 Otto Bayesdorfer builds the first Ottomobile, becoming the first of nearly a dozen Omaha car manufacturers.
- 1899 The Greater America Exposition held on the same site with many of the same features at the Trans-Mississippi Exposition.

== 1900–49 ==
- 1903 1,900 strikers attack wagons in downtown Omaha.
- 1908 The US Army Signal Corps is established at the Fort Omaha Balloon School.
- 1908 Omaha University, later to become the University of Nebraska-Omaha, is founded in the Redick Mansion at North 24th and Pratt Streets.
- 1912 The Omaha Waterworks were taken over by the city after a fifteen-year fight for municipal ownership.
- 1913 Easter Sunday tornado kills 140 people, injures 400 more, and causes a property loss of several millions of dollars.
- 1915 South Omaha, Florence, Benson and Dundee were annexed to the city.
- 1917 Father Edward J. Flanagan founded Boys Town.
- 1917 Fort Omaha became an Army balloon school.
- 1919 Rioters lynch Will Brown and pillage North Omaha during the Omaha Race Riot of 1919.
- 1925 Malcolm X born in North Omaha.
- 1931 The Joslyn Art Museum opened.
- 1938 The Omaha Star, the only African American newspaper in Nebraska today, is founded.
- 1948 Omaha becomes nation's leading meat supplier, generating annual business in excess of $5 billion.

== 1950–99 ==
- 1950 The College World Series came to Omaha.
- 1958 The CEO of Berkshire Hathaway still lives in the same five-bedroom home in central Omaha, Nebraska, that he bought in 1958 for $31,500.
- 1962 Warren Buffett set up his office in Omaha, Nebraska, at the Berkshire Hathaway headquarters located at Blackstone Plaza (formerly named Kiewit Plaza) and started working out of this office in 1962, after acquiring control of Berkshire Hathaway, and has remained there for over 60 years.
- 1966 On July 5, the National Guard is called to quell two days of rioting among African Americans in North Omaha.
- 1968 Riots erupt in North Omaha in response to the assassination of Dr. Martin Luther King Jr.
- 1969 Riots erupt on June 24 after an Omaha police officer fatally shoots teenager Vivian Strong in the Logan Fontenelle Housing Projects.
- 1972 The Storz Brewery closes permanently.

== 2000–present ==
- 2007 On December 5, the Westroads Mall shooting occurred, leaving nine people (including the gunman) dead and four others wounded.
- 2015 On October 1, ConAgra Foods (a Fortune 500 company) announced that it was moving its corporate headquarters from Omaha to Chicago, transferring at least 300 jobs and eliminating another 1,000.

== See also ==
- History of Omaha, Nebraska
- List of Omaha landmarks
- Timeline of racial tension in Omaha, Nebraska
- Timeline of North Omaha, Nebraska history
- List of riots and civil unrest in Omaha, Nebraska
