= Memorial Park (Omaha) =

Park in Nebraska, United States

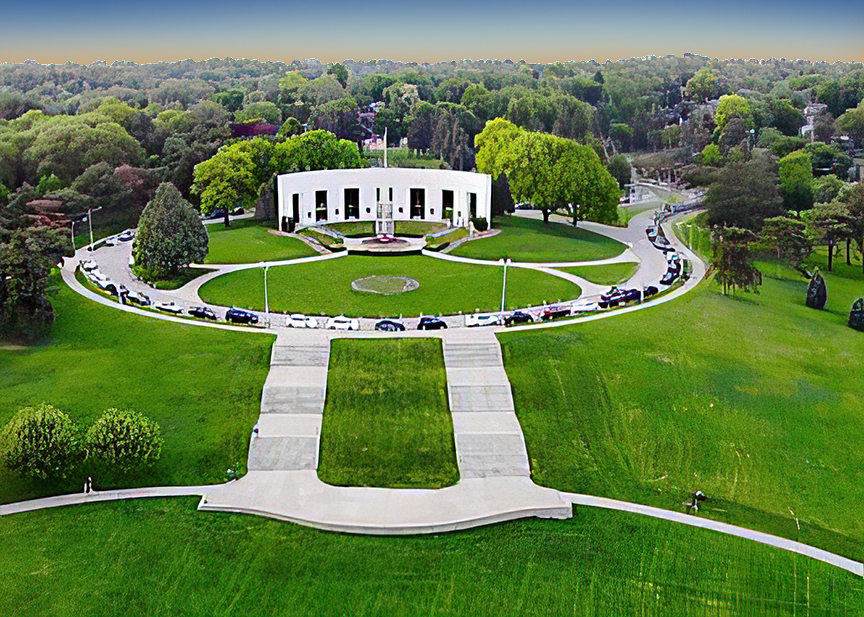
- Memorial Park, looking north
- Interactive map of Memorial Park
- Type: City park
- Location: Omaha, Nebraska, US
- Coordinates: 41°15′45″N 96°00′05″W
- Area: 67 acres (270,000 m^{2})
- Created: 1948
- Operator: Government of Omaha
- Status: Open all year

Memorial Park is a 65-acre park located at 6005 Underwood Avenue near the Dundee neighborhood of Omaha, Nebraska, United States. Its south perimeter runs adjacent to the Grand Army of the Republic Highway, also known as U.S. Route 6. The park was dedicated as a memorial to the armed services men and women from Douglas County who perished during World War II. Today it serves as Omaha’s setting to commemorate and honor those who served and died in conflicts, providing a place for remembrance and reflection on the sacrifices made.

== History ==
On March 3, 1943, before the idea of a war memorial had been proposed, the defunct Dundee Golf Course property wasn't being used. A local Kiwanis Club suggested (and property owner Dundee Realty Company agreed) that two hundred apportioned Victory Gardens be sponsored and planted there.

In a January 1944 letter to Henry Doorly, publisher of the Omaha World-Herald, Mrs. J W Broad, owner of the Gypsy Tea Shop noted that mothers and wives of those killed during World War II would come into her shop "looking so sorrowful" and suggested that a monument be erected to honor the fallen. As a result, the World War II Memorial Association of Omaha was formed under the leadership of Storz Brewery owner Robert H. Storz and many other prominent citizens of Omaha. He lamented a twelve-year struggle the American War Mothers experienced trying to raise money for a World War I monument in Omaha. In 1925 a $250,000 structure of Bedford limestone designed by famed war memorial sculptor Lorado Taft, was proposed for a prominent point in Elmwood Park. A scaled-back monument was eventually dedicated on November 1, 1937 at Turner Park. Robert Storz was intent that a permanent and suitable World War II monument should be achieved.

After years of zoning and legal disputes related to redevelopment plans, in August 1944, the World War II Memorial Association of Omaha executive committee and the Omaha City Council reached an agreement on the 22.91 acres of condemned Dundee Golf Course property (former Happy Hollow Country Club) near 60th Street and US Route 6 (Dodge Street). The remaining 42 acres of property were purchased from the Dundee Realty Company and the City of Omaha agreed to accept and maintain this ground for memorial park purposes. After owner Mary George King (daughter of Charles Carlton George) handed over the land, Dundee Realty Company folded. Shortly afterward, Mary George King and her husband H. Stephen King moved to La Jolla, California.

More than 3,000 individuals, patriot organizations, and business organizations, voluntarily contributed $233,732.59 for the purchase of land, architectural services, construction, and landscaping.

== Design ==
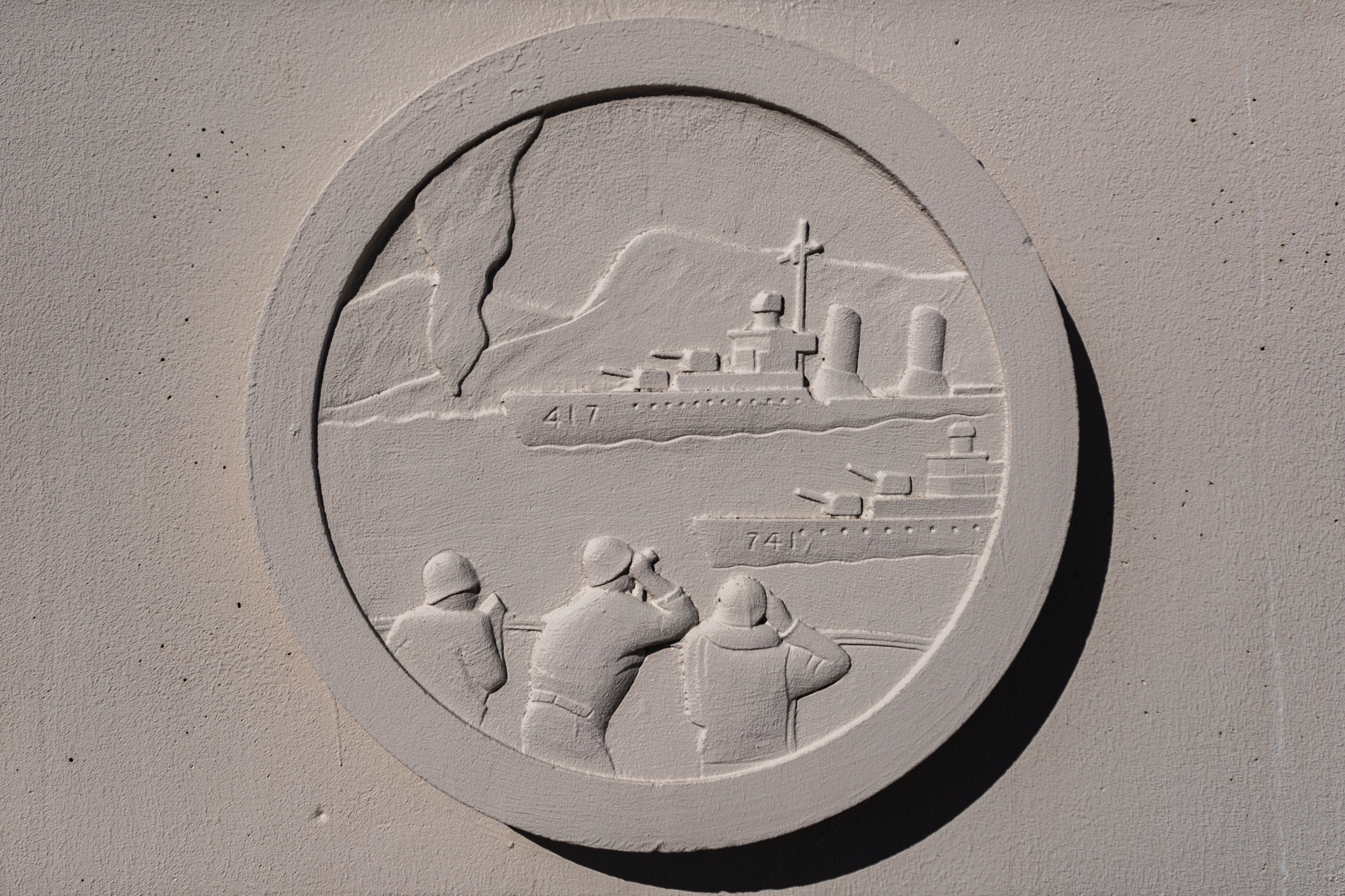
Memorial Park (Omaha) colonnade bas-relief medallion depicts Battle of Okinawa, USS Drexler (DD-741) and USS Morris (DD-417)

In 1945 the Leo A Daly Company of Omaha was chosen as the chief architect for the planned war memorial. John Caspar Wister of Philadelphia was named landscaper and horticulturist. The shrine is a semi-circular colonnade of seven arches. Above each arch, a circular bas-relief sculpture portrays a branch of World War II’s seven military branches: the US Navy, US Army Airborne Corp, US Army Infantry, US Marine Corps, US Army Medical Corps, US Army Field Artillery, and US Navy Aviators. Bronze plaques on the columns list the names of over 900 Douglas County men and women who died in combat and non-combat roles during World War II.

== Dedication ==
On Friday, June 4, 1948, President Harry S. Truman arrived in Omaha for the annual reunion of the 35th Infantry Division for which he served as officer Captain Harry Truman, commander of Battery D of the 129th Field Artillery Regiment. The following day at 2:30pm the president placed a wreath dedicating the new World War II Memorial Park. Truman then visited Boys Town and placed a wreath at the sarcophagus of Fr. Edward J Flanagan in the Dowd Memorial Chapel.

== Improvements ==
In 1959 the Omaha Rose Society added a rose garden, and in 1990 Woodmen of the World added flagpoles and flags along the driveway entering the park. A pedestrian bridge over Dodge Street called the Memorial Park Pedestrian Bridge was completed in 1968. The park was the site of several curfew and anti-Vietnam War protests by youth activists in the late 1960s and early 1970s. Volunteers continue to tend to over 1,000 rose bushes during the growing season.

Eagle Plaza was dedicated as part of the 75th anniversary celebration activities on Sunday, June 4th, 2023. Situated on the south ridge of Robert H Storz Drive, this 4,000 square foot public enclosure creates flexible and fully accessible space for activities, public art displays, military-associated groups, student leadership education, and other community-based activities. It was named in honor of Omaha Central High School’s Eagle Battalion JROTC program, the second oldest JROTC program in the country.

== Events ==
On the last Friday in June, there is a concert in the park along with a fireworks show in commemoration of the Independence Day (United States) holiday. Originally, the show was sponsored by Commercial Federal Bank. Later, the event was sponsored by Bank of the West. Currently, the event is called "The City of Omaha Celebrates America." The event attracts over 50,000 people each year to picnic, listen to music and watch an amazing fireworks presentation with friends and family. Many stake out large spots every year, like this patriotic display affectionately referred to as "The World's Largest American Flag Blanket!" Some claim it can be seen from space.

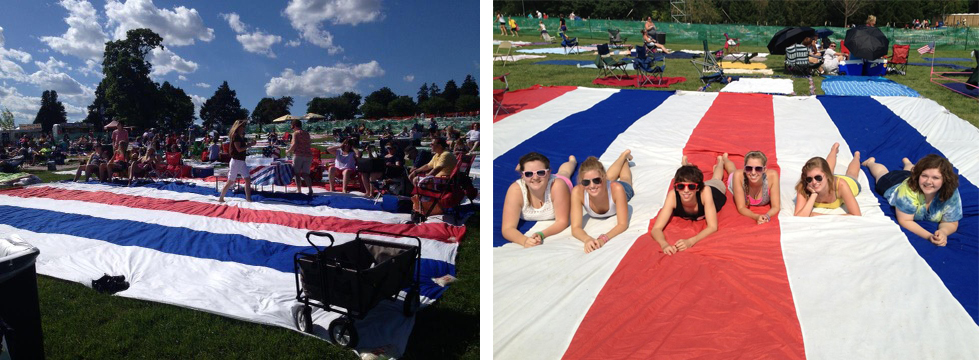
Is this the World's Largest American Flag Blanket?

Here are the musical acts who have performed there:

1987 - The Lettermen

1988 - Bobby Vinton

1993 - Frankie Valli & the Four Seasons, The Drifters

1994 - Martha Reeves and the Vandellas, Bobby Vee

1995 - Frankie Avalon, Sha Na Na

1996 - The Temptations

1997 - The Four Tops, America

1998 - Neil Sedaka, The Shirelles

1999 - Blood, Sweat & Tears, The Drifters

2000 - The Righteous Brothers, The Supremes

2001 - The Beach Boys, Gary Puckett

2002 - Creedence Clearwater Revisited, The Spinners

2003 - The Village People, The Pointers

2004 - (rained out) The Doobie Brothers, Three Dog Night

Also in 2004, 311 played at Memorial Park for free in celebration of Omaha's 150th Anniversary. There were over 40,000 people there to celebrate.

2005 - The Doobie Brothers, Three Dog Night, Mulberry Lane

2006 - REO Speedwagon, The Fifth Dimension

2007 - KC & the Sunshine Band, Little River Band

2008 - (rained out) Kool & The Gang, .38 Special

2009 - The Guess Who, Grand Funk Railroad

2010 - The Bank of the West Celebrates America concert marked its 20th year in Omaha in 2010 by bringing the national "United In Rock" tour of Foreigner, Styx, and Kansas to the annual free live concert and fireworks show in Memorial Park on Friday, July 2, 2010. Officials estimated attendance reached a record 80,000 attendees.

2011 - Cheap Trick, .38 Special, Take Me to Vegas. The stage moved (permanently) to the Dodge Street side of the Park for the 2011 concert.

2012 - Huey Lewis and the News, Mockingbird Sun, Scarlett Drive.

2013 - Pat Benatar & Neil Giraldo, Loverboy

2014 - Smash Mouth, Blues Traveler, Sugar Ray, Uncle Kracker

2015 - Joan Jett, Eddie Money

2016 - Kenny Loggins

2017 - Kool & the Gang

2018 – Starship featuring Marty Balin, Bostyx, Survivor

2019 – Chris Isaak, Little Steven & the Disciples of Soul

2020 – (event cancelled due to Covid Pandemic concerns)

2021 – Elvis Costello, Wyclef Jean

2022 - Sheryl Crow, Dave Mason

2023 - Melissa Etheridge, Herman's Hermits

2024 - Roger Daltrey, Inhaler

2025 - Ringo Starr and His All Starr Band, Mike Campbell and The Dirty Knobs

== See also ==
- Parks in Omaha, Nebraska
