= Dodge Park =

Recreational area in Nebraska, US

N.P. Dodge Memorial Park
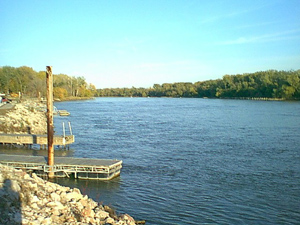
- Docks at Dodge Park.
- Interactive map of N.P. Dodge Memorial Park
- Type: Municipal (Omaha)
- Location: North Omaha
- Coordinates: 41.360176°N 95.955539°W
- Area: 44.5 acres (180,000 m^{2})
- Created: 1930
- Open: All year

N.P. Dodge Memorial Park, or simply Dodge Park, is a recreational area located at 11001 John J. Pershing Drive in North Omaha, Nebraska, United States. Located on the Missouri River, the park provides fishing, water skiing, and boating, as well as hiking throughout its riparian forests. Baseball fields, soccer fields, horseshoe pits, and tennis courts are included for sporting events. There is a picnic area, pavilions, historical monuments, and a campground.

== History ==
The site of Dodge Park was a location of one of Lewis and Clark's campgrounds on their expedition across the Louisiana Purchase in 1804. Shortly thereafter Manuel Lisa, a Spanish fur trader, established Fort Lisa to the northwest of the park. In the 1820s the American Fur Trading Company started Cabanne's Trading Post to the north.

Dodge Park was donated to the City of Omaha in 1930 in the memory of N. P. Dodge a local real estate magnate. A portion of the land donated is west of Pershing Drive and was named Hummel Park as a tribute to J. B. Hummel, a superintendent of the Omaha's Parks and Recreation Department.

== Present ==
Dodge Park remained a largely unused wilderness until the late 1960s. Recent improvements include upgrades to the park's roads, marina and a new playground. The Winter Quarters and historic Florence are located nearby.

== See also ==
- Parks of Omaha, Nebraska
