= Elmwood Park (Omaha) =

Neighborhood in Omaha, Nebraska, U.S.

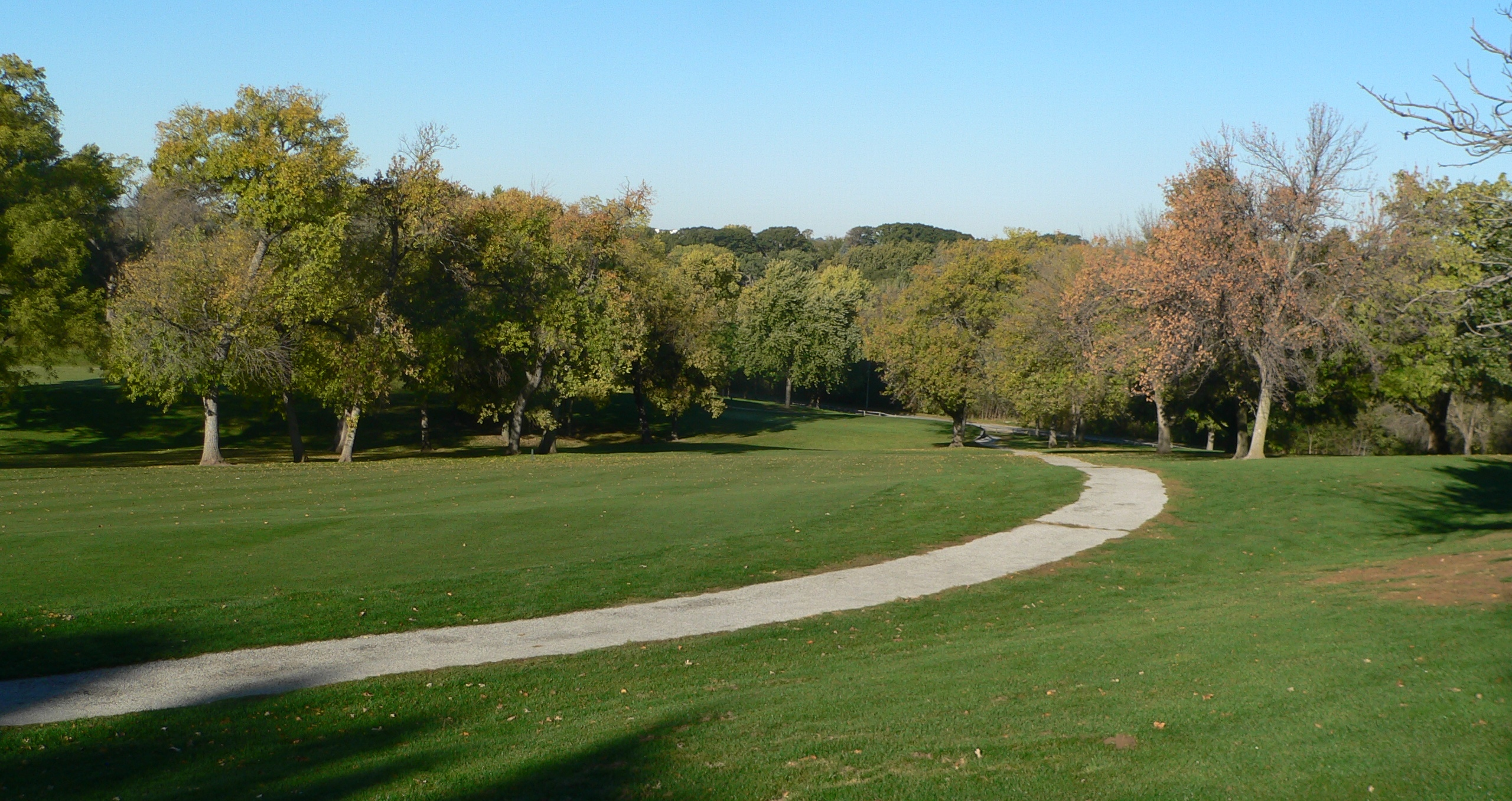
- Elmwood Park golf course
- Interactive map of Elmwood Park
- Type: Municipal (Omaha)
- Location: Midtown Omaha
- Coordinates: 41°14′N 96°00′W
- Area: 216.4
- Created: 1889
- Open: All year

The Elmwood Park neighborhood in Omaha, Nebraska is a historically significant area that was developed in the late 19th and early 20th century. It extends from Leavenworth Street on the north to Center Street on the south; from South 50th Street on the east to South 72nd Street on the west. Home to ethnic Swede celebrations through the 1950s, today, the neighborhood's park hosts the city's "Shakespeare on the Green" festival.

== History ==
Before the neighborhood was created, the area was the focus of the first court trial ever held in the Nebraska Territory. The case took place in 1857 when F.M. Woods brought a case against J. Pentecost for land theft. Defended by Nebraska Territorial politician Edward Morearty, Pentecost won the trial.

In the 1880s, C.C. and J.E. George laid out Happy Hollow Boulevard and developed the area south of Dodge and west of 50th to Elmwood Park. They filled in the creek that ran along 50th Street and added sidewalks and streetlights. Homes in the area reflected the Colonial, Georgian and Tudor Revival styles. Omaha annexed Elmwood Park and the surrounding neighborhood on April 24, 1917.

== Park and boulevard ==
In 1889, H.W.S. Cleveland recommended that Omaha acquire a park large enough to shut out city sights and sounds in order to refresh the senses. Elmwood Park, founded in 1889 at 802 South 60th Street, was one of Omaha's largest parks through the 1950s. Soon after the city acquired an initial 55-acre (220,000 m^{2}) donation of land for the park, the Omaha Bee described it as a "wild and romantic place... containing a wooded ravine that followed the course of a small stream." They continued, "There are all manner of shady nooks in this dell, and some of the largest forest trees in this section of the country are to be seen in it." The park, along with Happy Hollow Boulevard, was part of Cleveland's parks and boulevard plan for Omaha. Today the boulevard runs north from Elmwood Park past the University of Nebraska at Omaha campus and Memorial Park, onward to Benson.

The Elmwood Park pavilion was built in 1909 at a cost of $5,323. Designed by F. A. Henninger, the general contractors were Anderson-Freidman Construction. Originally an open-air structure, it was one of the first structures in Omaha built of cast concrete. A series of colonnade arches flank the sides of the Spanish Mission-style building. Deemed unsafe in 1939, it was closed to the public shortly thereafter. The stuccoed veneer and red tile roofed structure was updated and enclosed in 1940. In 1987, it was refurbished with $100,000 from a special bond issue. It is now enclosed and available for public rental.

In 1912, a local businessman donated a totem pole to the park that stood there through the 1930s, and the park was the site of camping grounds through the 1950s. The Elmwood Park Golf Course was opened in 1916, and featured ravines, grassy fields and roadways throughout. By 1917, the park had grown to 208.13 acres (0.8423 km^{2}), and it was the second largest in the city. From the late 19th century through the 1930s, an annual park was held for Omaha's African American community at the park, with as many as 10,000 people attending. In 1933, an artificial island was built in the park to house a small population of Rhesus macaques from the Henry Doorly Zoo. After an escape and numerous attempts, the island was removed, and the monkeys returned to the zoo. The University of Nebraska at Omaha relocated from its North Omaha campus to a 30-acre (120,000 m^{2}) parcel next to the park in 1937, sealing the park's size permanently. In the 1940s, native Omaha billionaire Warren Buffett set up a golf ball stand at the golf course in the park. Renovated again in 1987, the city spent $100,000 from a bond issue to replace windows and repair restrooms at the pavilion. The park received a $1 million renovation in 1993, and in 2000 the Peter Kiewit Foundation made a significant grant to the city that allowed the city to renovate the park's historic spring area, improve the swimming pool and create new entrance signage.

Today, Elmwood Park includes the 18-hole golf course, two baseball fields and a swimming pool. There are also paths and trails for biking and walking; a lagoon, picnic areas, restrooms, the historic pavilion, open spaces and a historic marker. Elmwood Park is also home to the annual Creighton Prep cross country race, also known as the Prep Invite.

== See also ==
- History of Omaha
- Neighborhoods in Omaha, Nebraska

== Bibliography ==
- Ducey, J.E., Sutherland, D.M., Johnson, C., et al. (2003) Chronicles of Wood Creek, Happy Hollow and the Hills of Dundee: History of the Omaha Area Featuring Bird Studies, Elmwood Park and Neighborhood Growth and Development: with Details of Avifauna and Local Flora. J.E. Ducey, Publishers.
