= Upland Park =

Park in Douglas County, Nebraska, United States

Coordinates: 41°11′47″N 95°57′33″W

Upland Park is a public park located at 3014 Jefferson Street in South Omaha, Nebraska. The park and surrounding neighborhood were opened in 1913.

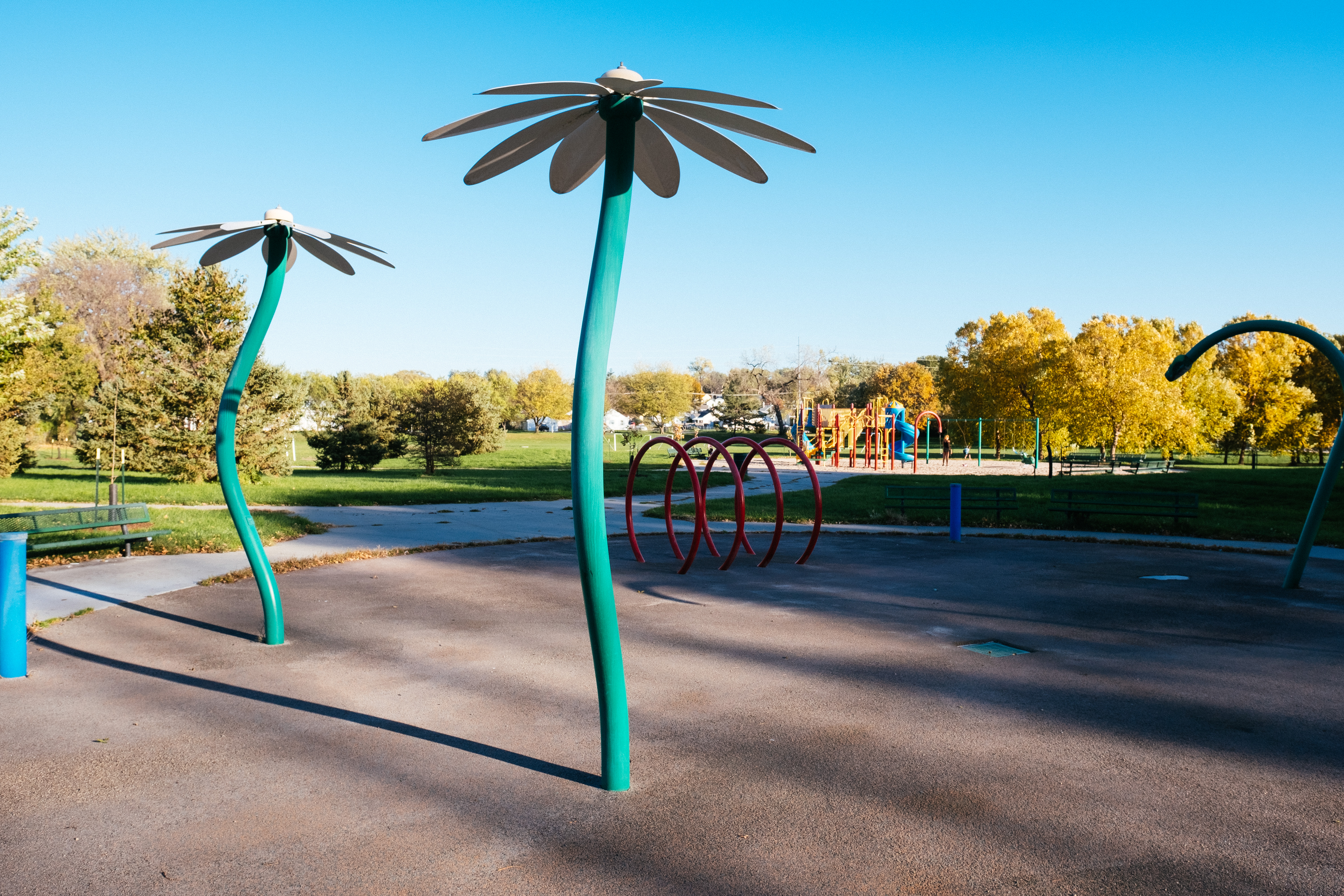
Playground at Upland Park

Upland Park has two tennis courts, two soccer fields, walking paths, and a small playground at the park, along with a "sprayground," which is a small water park. The sprayground replaced a swimming pool located at the park for several decades during a park-wide renovation in 1999. The spraygrounds are attributed in the 412 percent increase in park attendance in the year following its opening, drawing 7,500 additional users to the park annually. The park has been an important location for low-income and immigrant youth to play soccer, and according to the Omaha World-Herald, it was integral to the Omaha South High School's soccer team's success.

Because of its proximity to the former ASARCO site in Omaha, the park has been identified as being contaminated with lead.

== See also ==
- Parks in Omaha, Nebraska
