= Pipal Park =

Park in southwest Omaha, Nebraska

Coordinates: 41°14′00″N 096°01′57″W

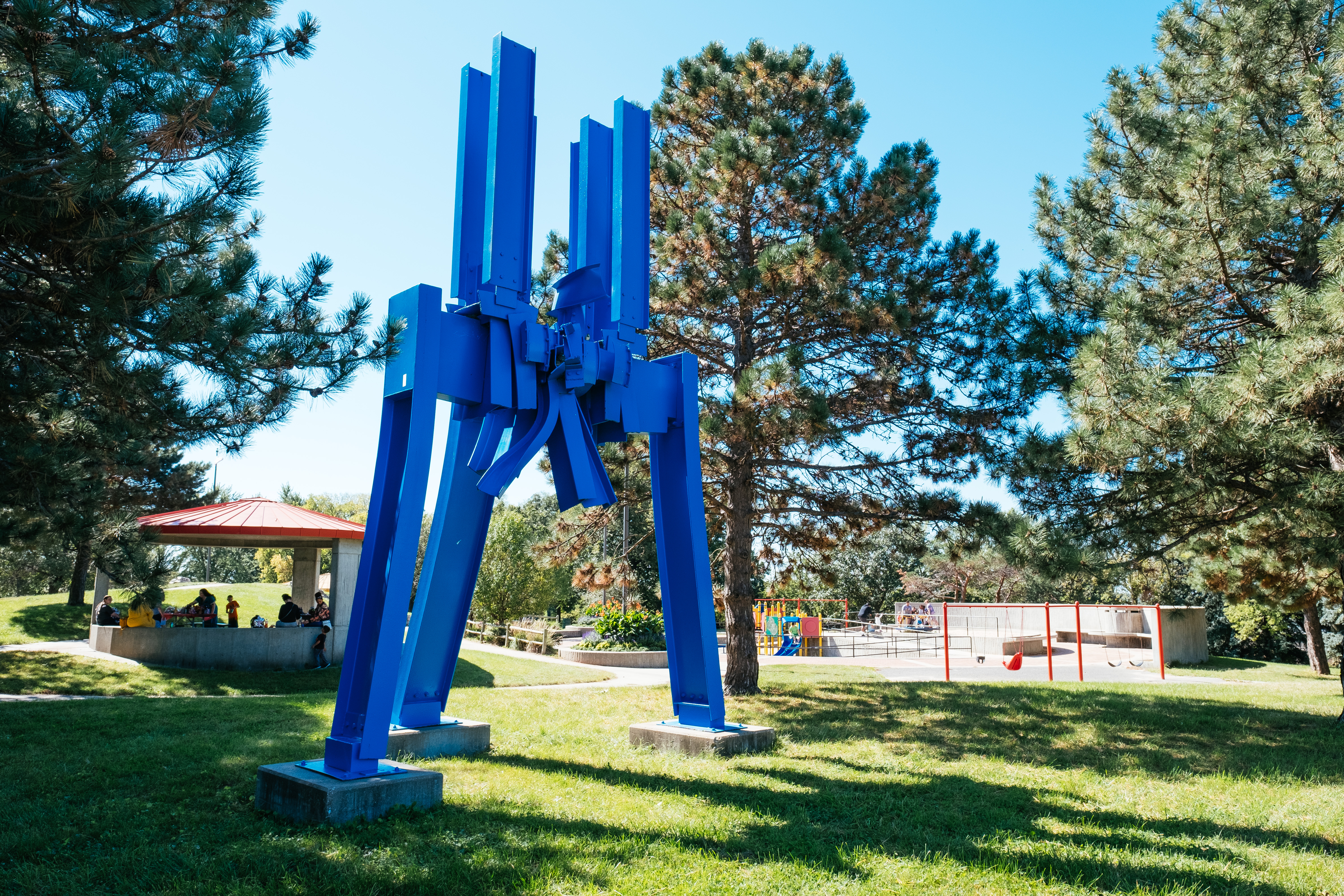
- Interactive map of Pipal Park
- Type: Municipal (Omaha)
- Location: West Omaha
- Area: 15 acres (6.1 ha)
- Created: 1977
- Status: Open all year

Pipal Park is located at 7770 Hascall Street in southwest Omaha, Nebraska.

== Features ==
Pipal Park is a popular, barrier-free playground in Omaha. The 15-acre (6.1 ha) park has a bridge, slides, swings, covered and uncovered picnic areas, a water feature and many art sculptures. The Pipal Park Community Center is located just south of the park. This facility houses a licensed pre-school, meeting rooms and a games room.

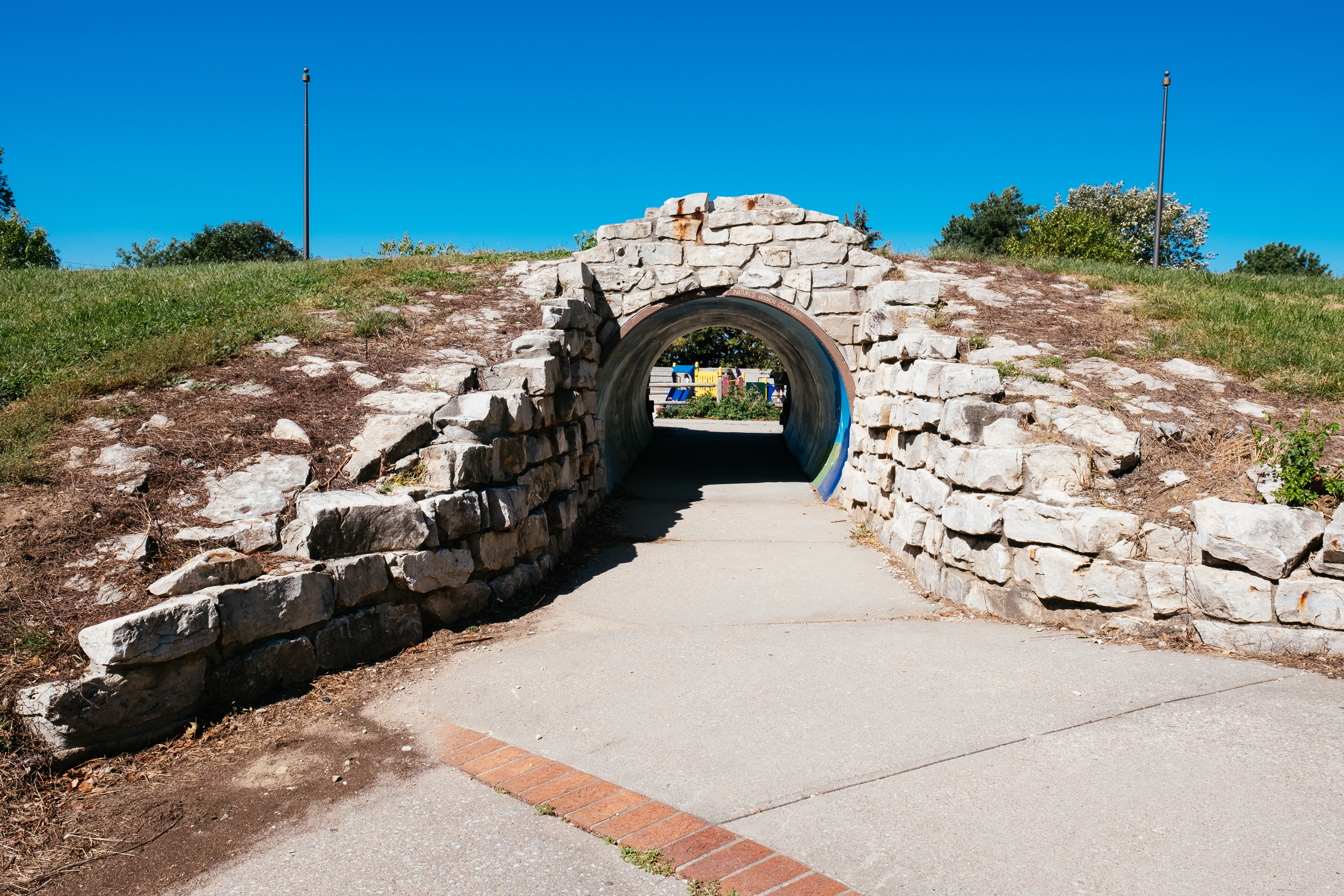
Tunnel entrance to the playground

== Historic properties ==
Historic properties in Pipal Park in alphabetical order
Name	Address	Built
Patrick Memorial	7802 Hascall St Omaha, NE 68124	1977
Pipal Park Community Center	7770 Hascall St Omaha, NE 68124	1985

== Storm destruction ==
Pipal Park was one of the areas struck by one of the most destructive tornados in the history of the US. The tornado devastated parts of Omaha including Pipal Park on May 6, 1975. A memorial named "Patrick" was constructed by UNO sculpture professor Sidney Buchanan, and was dedicated on May 5, 1977, two years after the tornado struck Pipal Park. It stands on a grassy knoll overlooking the park and symbolizes the order being reestablished from the chaos the tornado created. The Pipal Park recreational area was officially dedicated in 1985.

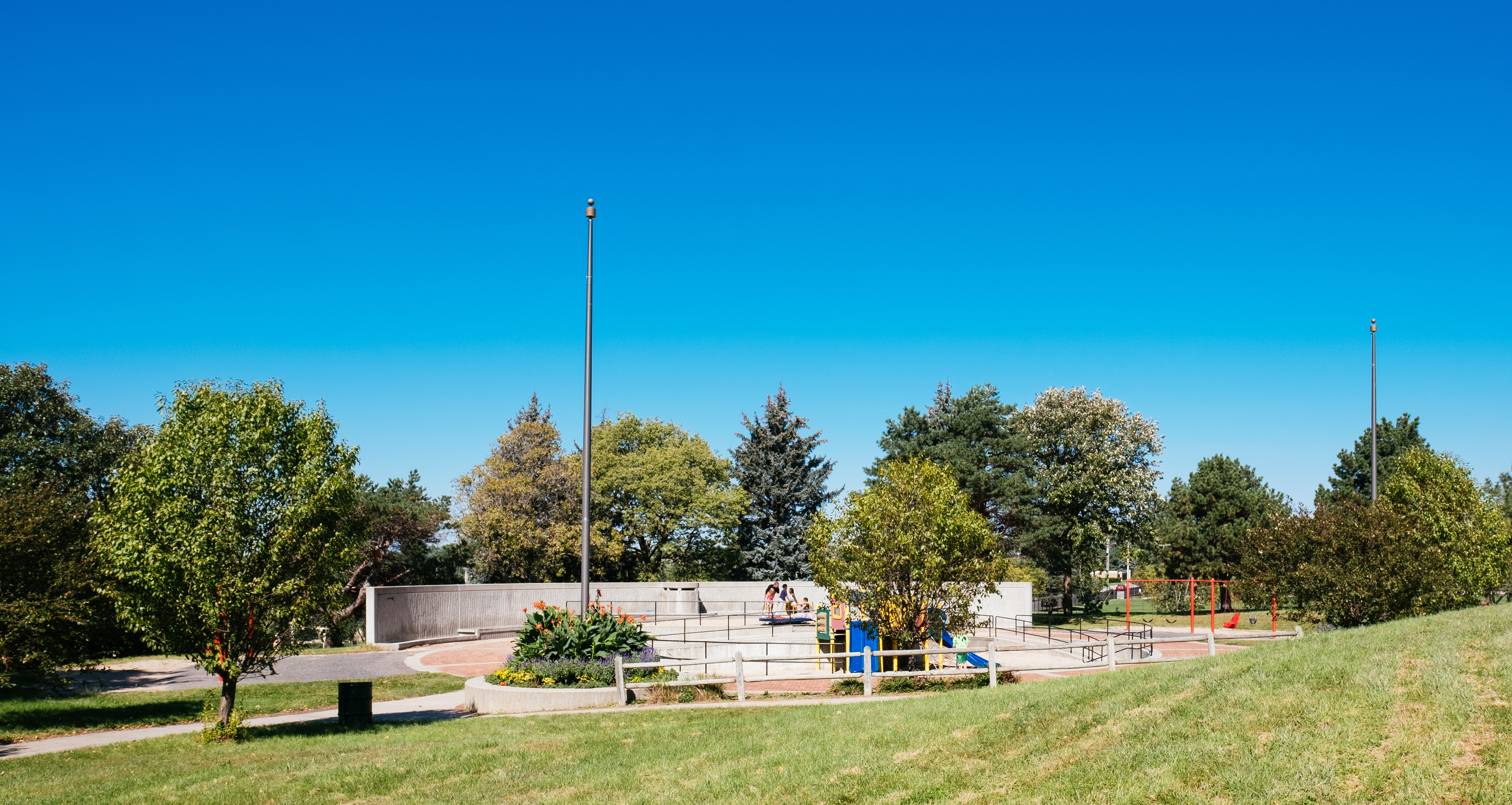
Park view from the southeast

== See also ==
- Neighborhoods of Omaha, Nebraska
- History of Omaha
