= Hummel Park =

Park in North Omaha, Nebraska

- Entrance sign at Hummel Park
- Interactive map of Hummel Park
- Type: Municipal (Omaha)
- Location: North Omaha
- Coordinates: 41°22′18″N 95°57′26″W
- Area: 202 acres (0.82 km^{2})
- Created: 1930
- Status: Open all year

Hummel Park is located at 11808 John J. Pershing Drive in North Omaha, Nebraska. Developed on 202 acres (0.82 km^{2}) of land donated to the City of Omaha in 1930, the park was named after Joseph B. Hummel, a long time superintendent of Omaha's Parks and Recreation Department.

== About ==
Hummel Park is covered in a riparian forest. Located in north of the Florence neighborhood, the park includes hiking trails, including the Omaha Riverfront Trail North. There are also playgrounds (removed summer 2009), horseshoe pits, a Missouri River overlook, picnic shelters and a disc golf course that was completed in 2011. The overlook is located above the popular "Devil's Slide," a natural cliff. There is also a summer day camp at the park which celebrated its 60th anniversary in 2009.

The Hummel Park Nature Center, operated by the Parks and Recreation Department, offers environmental education programs and special nature events.

== History ==
The location of Cabanne's Trading Post is at the corner of Ponca Road and John J. Pershing Road in the northwest corner of the park.

== Urban legends ==
There are a number of local urban legends concerning Hummel Park. The park has been said to be a hotspot for satanic ritual murders; there is no evidence of this besides graffiti depicting pentagrams, a form of vandalism that is common in public places. The arching branches of the trees at the park's entrance are said to be weighed down from the spirits of the victims of lynchings in the park. There is no evidence that any lynchings ever took place in Hummel Park. A stairway in the park has been called the "Stairs to Hell," as it has been reported that it is impossible to count the same number of steps ascending the stairs as descending them. However, this has been disproved—there are 188 steps, and any counting errors are likely due to the irregular shape of some steps.

The most widely known legend surrounding the park is that a group of albino people inhabit the dense woods of the park. This group is variously described as a family, a colony, or a group of homeless people. Sometimes the supposed colony is portrayed as violent attackers and cannibals or merely reclusive hermits. There has never, at any point, been any evidence to support the idea that a group of albino people lived in the park or attacked anyone in the park.

The urban legends about Hummel Park likely arose from its secluded locality, dense woods, and popularity as a destination for local teenagers. The bodies of several missing persons have been discovered in Hummel Park, but these were likely dumped in the park, as it is close to Omaha's urban center while still being densely wooded and well-concealed.

== See also ==
- Parks in Omaha
- Omaha, Nebraska
