= Old City Hall (Omaha) =

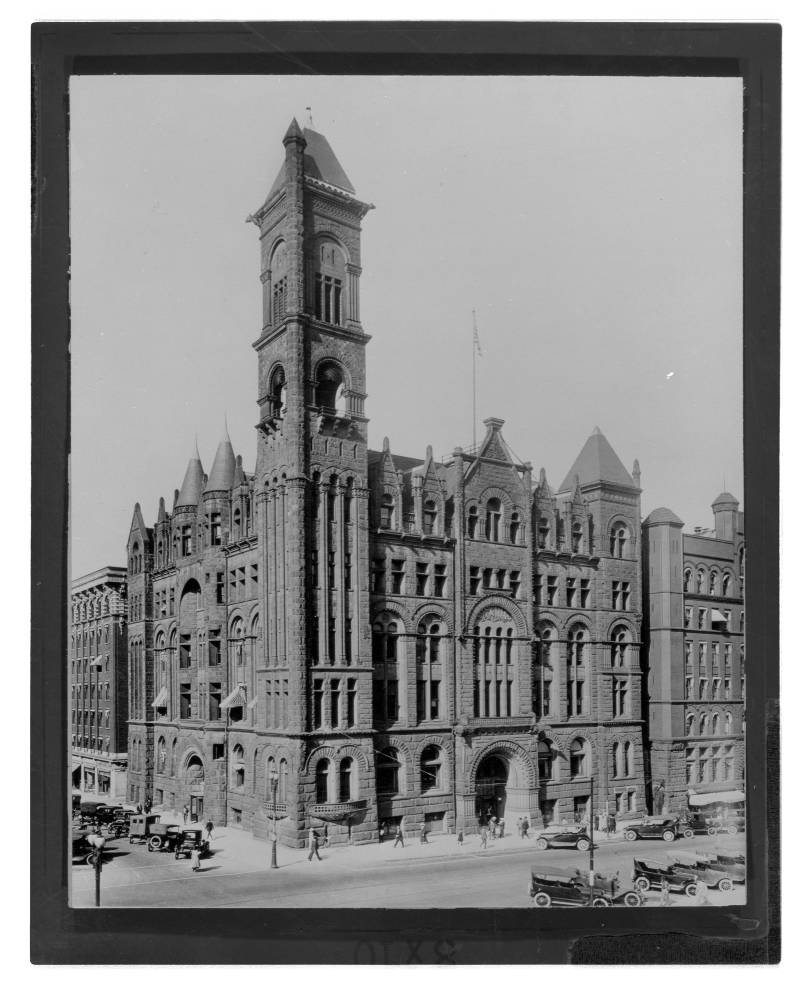
- Old City Hall in 1918
- Interactive map of the Old City Hall area

General information
- Architectural style: Richardson Romanesque/Gothic Revival
- Location: Omaha, Nebraska, United States
- Coordinates: 41°15′29″N 95°55′38″W
- Construction started: 1889
- Completed: 1890
- Demolished: 1966
- Cost: $550,000
- Client: Government of Omaha

Design and construction
- Architects: Fowler & Beindorff

The Old City Hall, also known as the Red Castle, located in Downtown Omaha, Nebraska, was located at the corner of 18th and Farnam Streets. Completed in 1890, the building was demolished 1966 with controversy subsequently erupting over landmark preservation in the city. Along with Omaha's Old Post Office, the Old City Hall became the center of talks for more deliberate preservation efforts by the community and city leaders.

== History ==
After an 1889 architectural competition won by Omaha architects Fowler & Beindorff, the City Hall was built by the construction firm of John F. Coots from Detroit, Michigan. The building cost approximately $550,000 to construct, and included several interesting features. A raised basement and first floor were built of granite, while the second through fifth floors were of red sandstone. Solid oak lined every interior wall, while the Victorian-style city council chamber featured a large brass chandelier. There were murals throughout the building by artist Gustave Fuchs, and "birdcage" elevators brought guests to the sixth floor of the building, which was added in 1916. Marble stairs led from the main entrance to a second-floor atrium court, and at the southwest corner of the building a clock tower rose nearly 20 stories into the air. A steepled roof crowned the building, with gargoyles abounding.

In 1919 Omaha mayor James C. Dahlman ordered the destruction of the top section of the tower, and in 1950 the building was completely renovated, destroying the original facade. In 1962 the City of Omaha Public Works Director officially classified the building as dangerous, and in 1966 Mayor A.V. Sorensen sold it to the Woodmen of the World. Late that year they demolished it along with the historic Bee Building in order to build the Woodmen Tower.

== See also ==
- History of Omaha
