= American football field =

Type of sports field

Diagram of a modern American football field

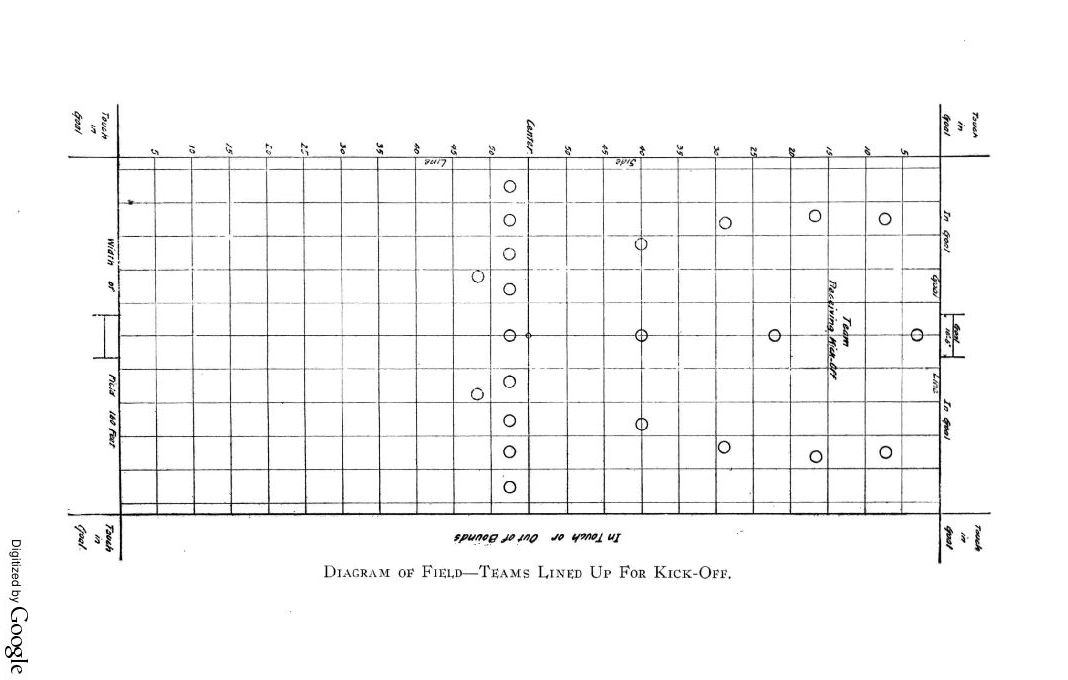
Diagram of an early 20th-century version of an American football field

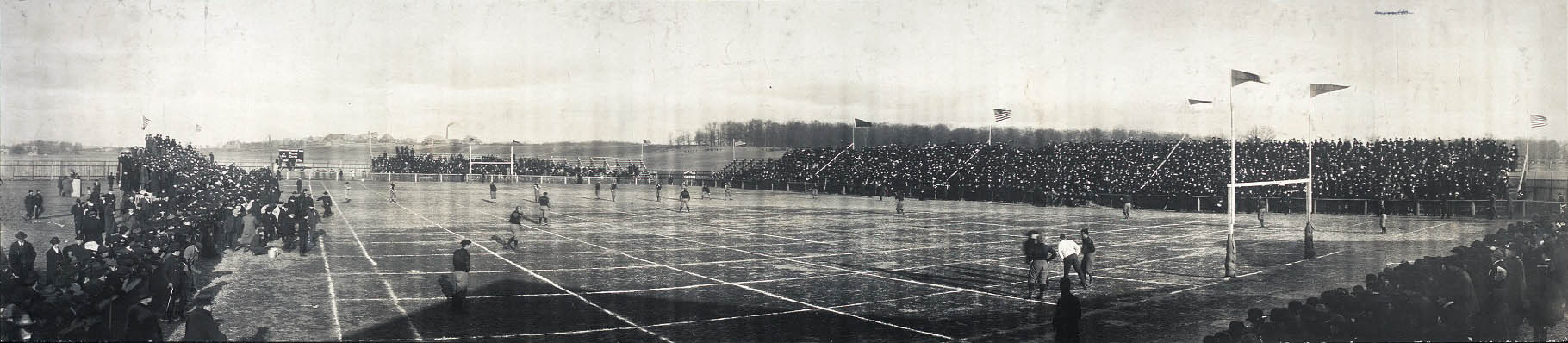
1906 field with grid pattern

The rectangular field of play used for American football games measures 360 feet (109.73 m) long separated between 300 feet (91.44 m) between the goal lines and an additional 30 feet (9.14 m) at each end for the end zones and 160 feet (48.77 m) wide. The field may be made of grass or artificial turf. When the "football field" is used as unit of measurement, it is usually understood to mean 100 yards (91.44 m), although technically the full length of the official field, including the end zones, is measured in feet by most major authorities and is 360 feet (109.7 m). The total area of the field is 57,600 sq ft or 5,350 m^{2}. There is a goal centered on each end line, with a crossbar 10 feet (3.0 m) above the ground and goalposts 18 feet 6 inches (5.64 m) apart (in college and the NFL) extending at least 35 feet (11 m) above the crossbar. Between the goal lines, additional lines span the width of the field at 5-yard intervals. This appearance led to the use of the term "gridiron" in the 1880s. For a few years in the early 20th century, lines perpendicular to the lines at 5-yard intervals spanned the length of the field, giving it a checkerboard-like appearance.

This article mainly describes the field used in the National Football League, college football, and other leagues playing the standard form of outdoor 11-man football. Other variants of American football such as nine-man or arena football typically use smaller fields with smaller end zones.

== Field description ==
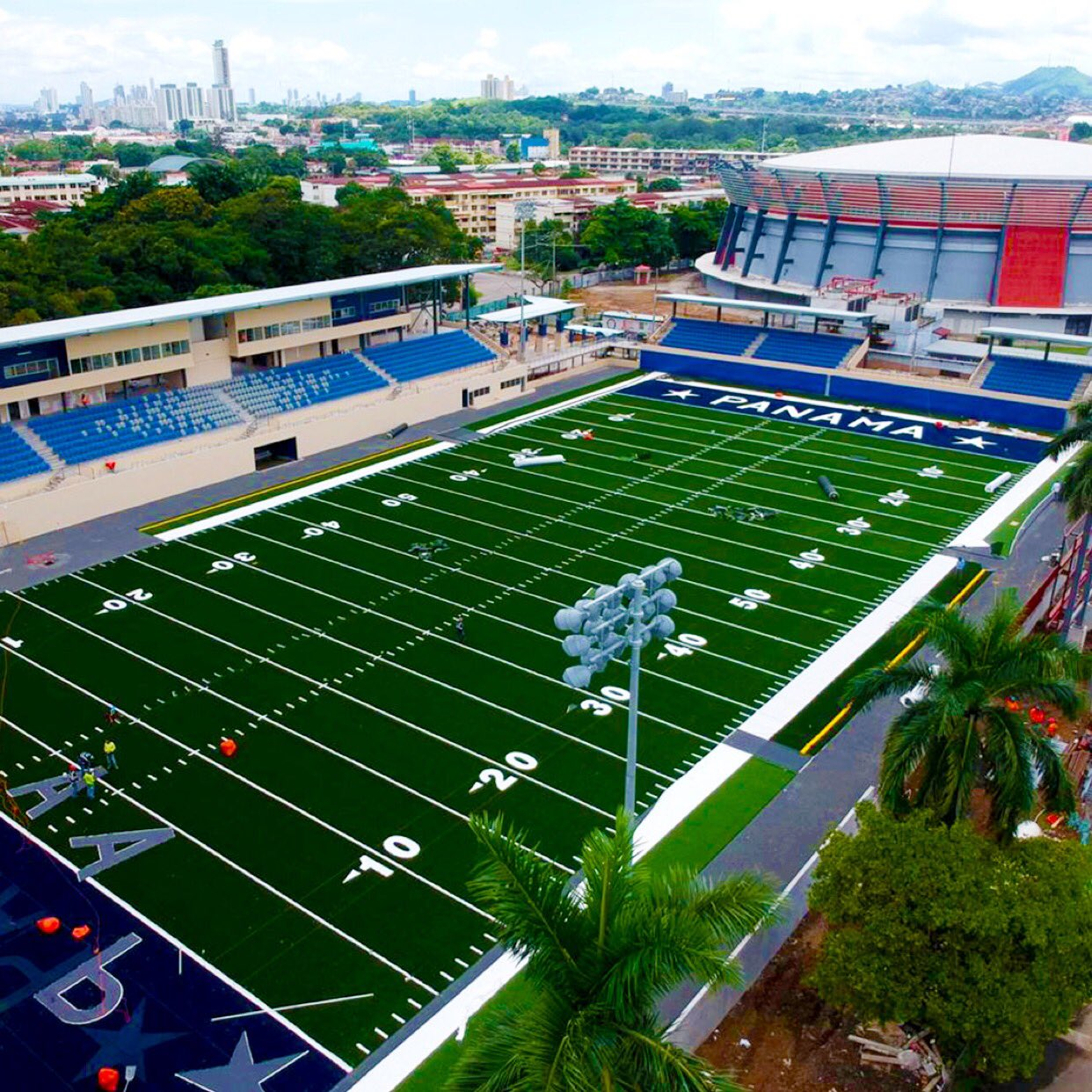
Emilio Royo stadium in Panama City

The entire field is a rectangle 360 feet (110 m) long by 160 feet (49 m) wide, covering a total of 1.32 acres. The two longer lines of the field perimeter are known as sidelines and the two shorter ones are called end lines. NFL rules call for the sidelines and end lines to be 6 feet (1.8 m) wide, though the lines may be narrower on fields used for multiple sports or by college or amateur teams. In all cases the sidelines and end lines are measured along the inside edges of the boundary lines, and the lines themselves are out of bounds. Most distances on a football field are expressed in terms of yards.

The goal lines span the width of the field and run 10 yards (9.1 m) parallel to each end line. The 100 yards between the goal lines where most gameplay occurs is officially called the "field of play" in the NFL rulebook. Additional lines span the width of the field at 5-yard intervals from each goal line.

=== End zones ===
The areas at each end of the field between the goal lines and end lines – including the goal lines themselves – are called the end zones. The end zones are where touchdowns, two-point conversions, and safeties are scored, and where touchbacks occur. Orange weighted pylons mark the four corners of each end zone. Team or league logos or other patterns may be painted inside the end zone as long as they do not interfere with the mandatory field markings.

=== Goals ===
A goal is centered on each end line, consisting of a horizontal crossbar 10 feet (3.0 m) above the ground and aligned with the inside edge of the end line, with vertical goal posts (colloquially "uprights") at each end of the crossbar 18 feet 6 inches (5.64 m) apart and extending at least 35 feet (11 m) above the crossbar in the NFL. College Football range from 20 feet to 35 feet above the crossbar. The goals are where field goals (including rare fair catch kicks) and extra points after touchdowns are scored. All NFL fields and many collegiate and amateur fields have slingshot-shaped goal structures, with a single gooseneck-shaped support post anchored to the ground out of bounds. Other amateur fields, particularly at the high school level, may have H-shaped goal structures with two support posts anchored to the ground directly below the crossbar; on fields used for multiple sports these goals may double as soccer goals at the appropriate regulation width for that sport, along with the goal structure behind it and netting. The NFL requires a ribbon to be attached to the top of each goal post to indicate wind direction and speed. Goal posts must be yellow in the NFL unless waived due to extraordinary circumstances; collegiate fields may have yellow or white goal posts. Amateur fields may also have shorter goal posts or a wider space between the goal posts. Since 1974, NFL rules have the goalposts positioned at the end line; prior to that season, they were on the goal line (they have been at the end line collegiately since 1927).

=== Yard lines ===
A "yard line" refers to the distance of some point on the 100-yard field of play – usually the line of scrimmage or the spot where a play ends – from the nearest goal line. When moving away from one goal line, the yard line numbers increase from 1 to 50 (midfield), then decrease back to 1 approaching the opposite goal line. Each yard line is said to "belong" to the team defending the closer end zone; for example, during a period where Team A is defending the north end zone and Team B is defending the south end zone, the 25-yard line closer to the north end zone is said to be Team A's 25-yard line.

Yard lines are identified with two rows of white numbers painted inside each sideline at 10-yard intervals (with some venues such as Tiger Stadium also marking 5-yard intervals, and some such as Sanford Stadium marking the goal line as "G"); the numbers 10 through 40 also include an arrow indicating the nearer goal line. NFL rules call for the bottom edge of each number to be 12 yards from the sideline. The yard lines are also identified at 10-yard intervals by orange markers placed outside the sidelines adjacent to the respective line. Yard lines other than multiples of 5 are marked by 2-foot (0.61 m) long, 4-inch (0.10 m) wide lines painted parallel to the goal lines at 1-yard intervals spanning the length of the field just inside each sideline as well as at the hash marks (see below).

=== Hash marks ===
The hash marks (officially "inbounds lines" in the NFL rulebook) are two rows of short lines running the length of the field that mark the boundaries of where a scrimmage down may start. If the ball is downed outside the hash marks or run out of bounds, the next play begins at the hash mark closest to the spot where it is downed. In the NFL since 1972, the hash marks are 70 feet 9 inches (21.56 m) from each sideline; in college football they are 60 feet (18 m) from each sideline. At each 5-yard line they are marked with 2-foot (0.61 m) lines painted parallel to the sidelines. Between the 5-yard lines they are marked with 2-foot lines painted perpendicular to the sidelines at 1-yard intervals. The hash marks are painted so that the edge farthest from the sideline is the required distance from the sideline.

In the NFL and most forms of indoor football, the hash marks are in line with the goalposts. College and high school football fields have hash marks that are significantly wider than the goal posts. The college football standard, which was the previous standard in the NFL (from 1945 to 1971), is 40 feet apart (20 yards from the sidelines), instituted in 1993. Previously, the college width was the same as the high school standard, at one-third of the width of the field (53 1/3 feet).

=== Other markings ===
In the NFL, a 3-foot (0.91 m) line is painted parallel to the goal line at the center of the 2-yard line; this denotes the line of scrimmage for a two-point conversion attempt (this was also the line of scrimmage for an extra point attempt prior to 2015); at the college level, this special hashmark is on the 3-yard line for an extra point attempt.

A small X may be painted at the center of each 35-yard line on NFL or college fields to indicate the spot where kickoffs take place.

Most professional and collegiate fields have a team or league logo painted at the 50-yard line. Special games such as the Super Bowl or college bowl games may have the event logo painted at the 50-yard line. These logos as well as any other non-mandatory field markings require league approval and may not interfere with mandatory field markings.

Decorative yard lines, either at the 25-yard or 20-yard line, are common, usually featuring either team colors or American flag colors, and the 20-yard version indicates the start of the red zone.

According to the high school rulebook recommendations, the field should be angled (or "crowned") at approximately 1.2° (rising 1/4 inch per foot, or 1 in 48) upward from each sideline to the center of the field so that the center is 20 inches (51 cm) higher than the sidelines, allowing proper drainage.

== See also ==
- Canadian football field
- Indoor practice facility
