= Government of Omaha =

Omaha Government

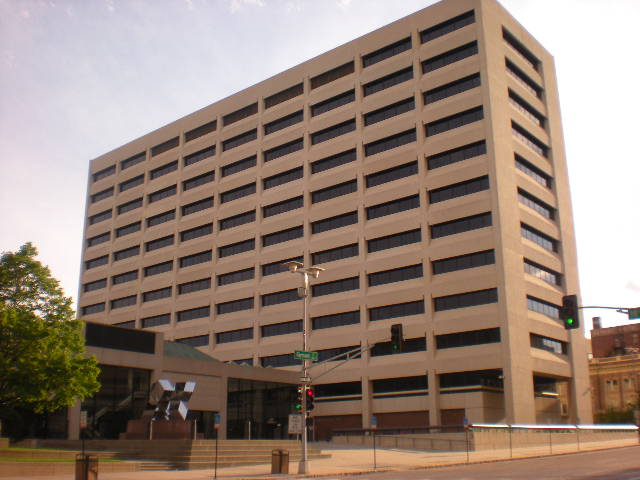
Omaha's City Offices Building in Downtown Omaha.

The government of the City of Omaha, Nebraska consists of the Mayor of Omaha, the Omaha City Council and various departments of the City of Omaha, which is located in Douglas County, Nebraska. The city of Omaha was founded in 1854 and incorporated in 1857.

== About ==
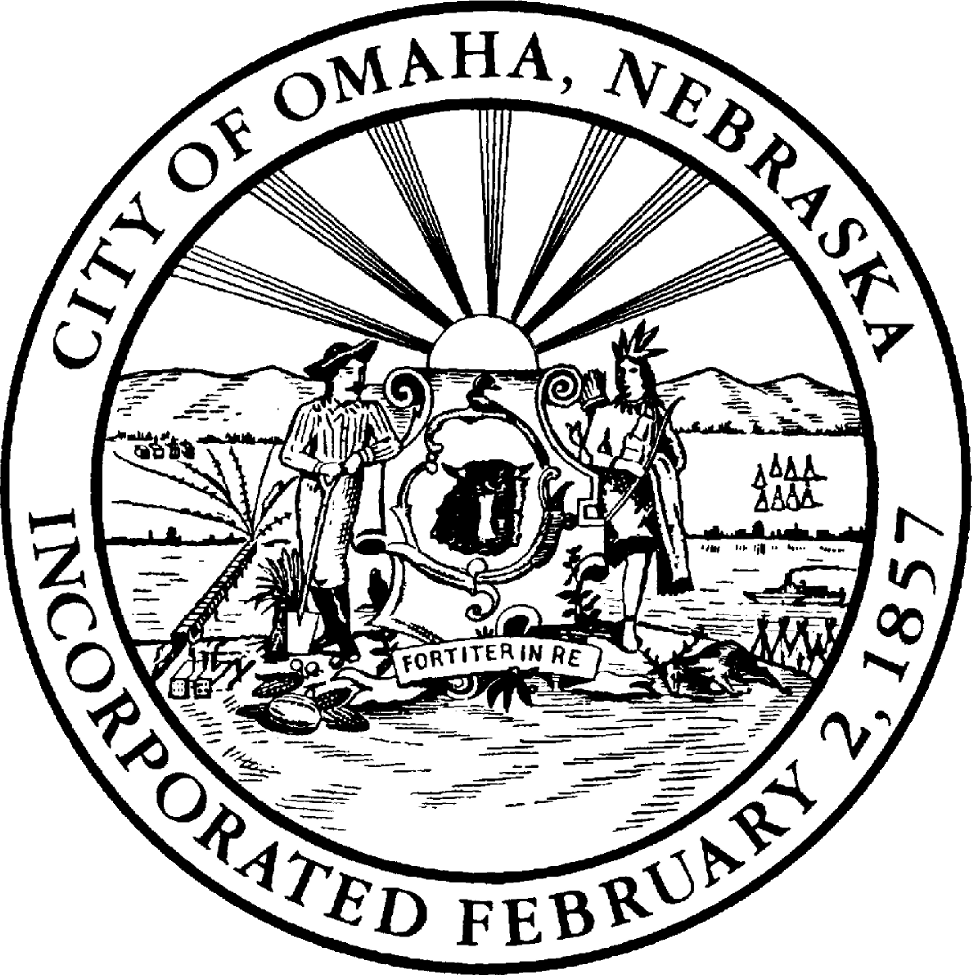
Seal of the City of Omaha

Omaha operates under a strong mayor form of government. The mayor, who does not serve on the council, and seven council members are all elected to four-year terms. The mayor appoints commissioners and other officials who oversee the various departments. In addition to the mayor, Omaha's two other citywide elected officials are the clerk and the treasurer.

The Omaha City Council is the legislative branch and is made up seven members elected from districts across the city. The council enacts local ordinances and approves the city budget. Government priorities and activities are established in a budget ordinance approved annually. The council takes official action through the passage of ordinances and resolutions.

The City of Omaha has considered consolidating with Douglas County government. Currently colocated within the Omaha/Douglas Civic Center, the government offices for both the city and the county are in downtown Omaha.

== Currently ==
The current Mayor of Omaha is John Ewing Jr., a member of the Democratic Party. The City Clerk is Dan Esch, a member of the Democratic Party and members of the City Council are Pete Festerson, Council President from District 1; Juanita Johnson from 2; Danny Begley from 3; Ron Hug from 4; Don Rowe from 5; Brinker Harding from 6 and; Aimee Melton, Council Vice President from 7.

=== Departments ===
- Omaha City Clerk
- Omaha City Council
- Omaha Finance Department
- Omaha Fire Department
- Omaha Greater Omaha Workforce Development
- Omaha Human Resources Department
- Omaha Human Rights and Relations Department
- Omaha Law Department
- Omaha Public Library
- Mayor's Office
- Parks and Recreation
- Omaha Planning Department
- Omaha Police Department
- Omaha Public Works Department
- Omaha Purchasing Department

=== Other city-related entities ===
- Metropolitan Utilities District
- Omaha Housing Authority
- Omaha Public Power District
- Omaha Public Schools
- Omaha Airport Authority
- Landmarks Heritage Preservation Commission

== See also ==
- Parks in Omaha, Nebraska
- Crime in Omaha
- Transportation in Omaha
- History of Omaha
- Education in Omaha, Nebraska
