= Mercer (surname) =

Mercer is an English and Scottish surname. It is an occupational name, derived from the Old French word "mercier" or "merchier", meaning a merchant: originally one trading in textiles (mercery).

== People ==
=== Academics ===
- Alison Mercer (born 1954), New Zealand zoologist
- Asa Mercer, first president of the Territorial University of Washington and a member of the Washington State Senate
- James Mercer (mathematician), English mathematician
- Roger Mercer, British archaeologist

=== Actors, performers, presenters and producers ===
- Beryl Mercer, Spanish-born British actress
- Bill Mercer, American sportscaster
- Jack Mercer, American animator and voice actor
- Marian Mercer, award-winning American actress
- Matthew Mercer, American voice actor
- Phil Mercer (born 1974), English BBC radio presenter
- Rick Mercer, Canadian comedian, television personality and political satirist
- Sam Mercer, film producer
- William (Rosko) Mercer (1927–2000), known as Rosko, American news announcer and disc jockey

=== Athletes and sports personalities ===
- Alex Mercer (footballer), Scottish footballer
- Arthur Mercer (1902–1994), English footballer
- Dawson Mercer (born 2001), Canadian ice hockey player
- Gary Mercer (born 1966), New Zealand rugby league footballer and coach
- Joe Mercer, English football player and manager
- Joe Mercer (jockey), English jockey
- LaVon Mercer (born 1959), American-Israeli basketball player
- Leroy Mercer, American football player
- Mike Mercer (basketball), American basketball player
- Mike Mercer (American football), former American college and professional football player
- Ray Mercer, American professional boxer, former WBO World Heavyweight Champion, Olympic gold medalist
- Ron Mercer, American former basketball player at the University of Kentucky, in the National Basketball Association
- Tommy Mercer, American professional wrestler
- Win Mercer, pitcher in Major League Baseball from 1894 to 1902

=== Literary figures ===
- Cecil William Mercer (1885–1960), British novelist who wrote under the pseudonym of Dornford Yates
- David Mercer (playwright), English playwright and dramatist
- Harold Mercer (1882–1952), Australian poet and short story writer
- Jeremy Mercer, Canadian writer
- Mick Mercer, journalist and author
- William Mercer (poet) (c. 1605 – c. 1675), Scottish poet and army officer

=== Musicians ===
- Carey Mercer, Canadian indie singer-songwriter
- James Mercer (musician), guitarist, lead singer and songwriter of the Shins
- Jerry Mercer, former drummer for the Canadian rock groups April Wine and Mashmakhan
- Johnny Mercer, American songwriter and singer
- Mabel Mercer, English-born cabaret singer
- Vic Mercer, better known as "Celph Titled", American rapper

=== Politicians and civil servants ===
- Bob Mercer (politician), Canadian politician
- Charles F. Mercer, nineteenth-century U.S. politician from Virginia
- David Henry Mercer, Nebraska Republican politician
- James Mercer, soldier, jurist, Virginia delegate to the Second Continental Congress
- John Francis Mercer, American lawyer, planter, and politician from Virginia and Maryland
- Johnny Mercer, British politician (Minister for Veterans 2019–2021), former army officer
- Patrick Mercer, British politician, military novelist, former army officer
- William Thomas Mercer (1821–1879), British Colonial Secretary in Hong Kong, 1859–1868
- William W. Mercer, United States Attorney for the District of Montana

=== Soldiers ===
- General Cavalié Mercer, British artillery officer and author of Journal of the Waterloo Campaign
- Hugh Mercer, physician, brigadier general in the Continental Army and a close friend to George Washington
- Hugh W. Mercer, officer in the United States Army and then a Confederate general during the American Civil War
- Malcolm Mercer, Canadian general, barrister and art patron
- Major Mercer of the Worcestershire horse, who played a prominent part on the Parliamentary side at the Battle of Worcester in 1651

=== Others ===
- George Mercer, rapist
- Henry Chapman Mercer, Pennsylvania archeologist, tile-maker, and designer of poured-concrete structures such as the Mercer Museum
- Henry Mercer (priest), Anglican clergyman and fraudster
- Lucy Mercer best known for her affair with Franklin Delano Roosevelt
- John Mercer (disambiguation)
- Mark Mercer (preservationist) (died 2019)
- Nelson Samuel Mercer (1874–1963), physician
- Rebekah Mercer, head of Mercer Family Foundation; daughter of Robert Mercer;
- Robert Mercer (businessman) (born 1946), computer scientist and former co-CEO of Renaissance Technologies
- Robert Mercer (priest) (born 1935), English priest
- Ruth Sienkiewicz-Mercer, quadriplegic and American disability rights activist
- Sam Mercer (preservationist) (1920–2013)
- Samuel David Mercer (1841–1907), physician
- Sidney Agnew Mercer, English watercolourist for whom the Mercer Art Gallery, Harrogate, England, is named

== Fictional characters ==
- Alex Mercer, a character in the Prototype (video game) game series published by Activision
- Alex Mercer, a character in Netflix's Julie and the Phantoms
- Anton Mercer, a character in Power Rangers Dino Thunder
- Bobby, Jeremias, Angel and Jack Mercer, characters in John Singleton's film Four Brothers
- Daniel Mercer, in the 6 Years film
- Ed Mercer, in Seth MacFarlane's science-fiction television show The Orville
- Gretchen Mercer, a character in Family Guy
- Ian Mercer, in the Pirates of the Caribbean film series
- Owen Mercer, in the DC Universe
- Michael Mercer and Maxxine Mercer, characters in The Walking Dead
- Robbie Mercer in the movie Scream IV
- Roy D. Mercer, fictional radio character
- Wilbur Mercer, in Philip K. Dick's science fiction novel Do Androids Dream of Electric Sheep?
