= Mercer =

Mercer may refer to:

== Business ==
- Mercer (automobile), a defunct American automobile manufacturer (1909–1925)
- Mercer (consulting firm), a human resources consulting firm headquartered in New York City, US
- Mercer (occupation), a merchant or trader, more specifically a merchant who deals in textiles (mercery)
  - Mercer, a member of the London guild of the Worshipful Company of Mercers
- Mercer Pottery Company, a defunct American company
- Mercer Union, an artist-run centre in downtown Toronto, Ontario, Canada

== People and fictional characters ==
- Mercer (surname), a list of people and fictional characters with the surname
- Mercer (given name), a list of people and fictional characters so named

== Places ==
=== United States ===
- Fort Mercer, American Revolution fort along the Delaware River in New Jersey
- Mercer Township, Adams County, Iowa, an unincorporated community
- Mercer, Maine, a town
- Mercer, Missouri, a city
- Mercer, North Carolina, an unincorporated community
- Mercer, North Dakota, a city
- Mercer, Ohio, an unincorporated community
- Mercer, Pennsylvania, a borough
- Mercer, Tennessee, an unincorporated community
- Mercer, Wisconsin, a town
- Mercer (CDP), Wisconsin, an unincorporated census-designated place
- Mercer Arboretum and Botanic Gardens, Harris County, Texas
- Mercer Caverns, Murphys, California
- Mercer County (disambiguation)
- Mercer Island, Washington
- Mercer Lake, West Windsor, New Jersey
- Mercer Township (disambiguation)
- Mercer Street (Manhattan)

=== Antarctica ===
- Mount Mercer (Antarctica)
- Mercer Ice Stream, Marie Byrd Land
- Mercer Ridge, Marie Byrd Land
- Mercer Lake (Antarctica), West Antarctica

=== Elsewhere ===
- Mercer, New Zealand, a village
- Te Unuhanga-a-Rangitoto / Mercer Bay, in West Auckland, New Zealand
- Mercer Bay, a small bay on the southeast coast of Cumberland West Bay on South Georgia Island
- Mercer 3, a globular cluster of the Milky Way galaxy

== Other uses ==
- Mercer Arena, Seattle, Washington, a performing arts venue
- Mercer Art Gallery, Harrogate, England, also known as "The Mercer"
- Mercer House (Savannah, Georgia)
- Mercer House (Natchez, Mississippi)
- Mercer Museum, a National Historic Landmark in Doylestown, Pennsylvania
- Mercer Oak, a large white oak tree that stood in Princeton Battlefield State Park in Princeton
- Mercer University, a private university with its main campus in Macon, Georgia, US
- USS Mercer, two ships

== See also ==
- Mercer's condition, in mathematics
- Mercer and Somerset Railway, a short-lived line of the Pennsylvania Railroad in western New Jersey
- Methicillin-resistant Staphylococcus aureus (MRSA), sometimes misspelled as "Mercer" or "Mercer's Bacterial Disease"
