= Nelson Samuel Mercer =

American physician (1874–1963)

- Born: May 23, 1874; Omaha, Nebraska, U.S.
- Died: October 17, 1963 (aged 89); Omaha, Nebraska, U.S.
- Burial place: Forest Lawn Cemetery, Omaha, Nebraska, U.S.
- Spouse: Anna Mary Mulholland (–1963; his death)
- Relatives: Samuel David Mercer (father); Sam Mercer (son); Mark Mercer (grandson)

Nelson Samuel Mercer (May 23, 1874 – October 17, 1963) was a noted American physician from Omaha, Nebraska.

== Early life ==
Mercer was born in Omaha, Nebraska, in 1874 to Dr. Samuel David Mercer and Elizabeth Covert Hulst. He was one of their six known children, alongside George, Emma, Carrie, Mary and Robert. Emma and Robert died in infancy; Carrie drowned, in her early 30s, in 1911, having fallen overboard from the SS Minneapolis. She had been suffering from suicidal mania. Nelson was also a passenger.

When Nelson was 11, his father had built what is now known as the Dr. Samuel D. Mercer House.

Mercer graduated from Yale Medical College.

== Personal life ==
Mercer married Anna Mary Mulholland, with whom he had three known children: Margaret, Nancy and Samuel.

He lived in London, England, for a period of the early 20th century.

Portraits of Mercer, his wife and his father, the work of J. Laurie Wallace, are in the possession of the Smithsonian American Art Museum.

== Death ==
At the time of his death, in 1963, Mercer, then aged 89. He had been living at his father's former home, at 3920 Cuming Street, which by that point had been converted into the Mercer Apartments.

He was interred in Omaha's Forest Lawn Cemetery.
