= Minnehaha (disambiguation) =

Minnehaha is a mythical Native American character.

Minnehaha may also refer to:

== Places ==
=== Canada ===
- Minnehaha, Saskatchewan, a locality in Rural Municipality of Parkdale No. 498

=== United States ===
- Minnehaha, Arizona
- Minnehaha, Colorado
- In Minnesota:
  - Min Hi Line, a linear park parallel to Minnehaha Avenue
  - Minnehaha Academy
  - Minnehaha Creek
  - Minnehaha Falls
  - Minnehaha Falls Lower Glen Trail, a hiking path
  - Minnehaha Park (Minneapolis)
  - Minnehaha, Minneapolis, a neighborhood in Minneapolis
  - Minnehaha Trail, a multi-use path
- Minnehaha, New York
- Minnehaha, Washington
- Minnehaha County, South Dakota
- Minnehaha Falls (Georgia)
- Minnehaha Island, an island on the Potomac River
- Minnehaha Springs, West Virginia

== Vessels ==
- SS Minnehaha, an ocean liner
- Minnehaha (cargo ship), a freighter
- Minnehaha (sternwheeler), a steamboat in Oregon, U.S., in the 1860s and 1870s
- Minnehaha (steamboat), a steamboat on Lake Minnetonka, in Minnesota
- Minne-Ha-Ha II, a steamboat on Lake George
- Minnehaha, a 36' sailboat used by Kirsten Neuschäfer to win the 2022 Golden Globe solo round the world race

== Other uses ==
- 50th Street / Minnehaha Park (Metro Transit station), a light rail station
- The Death of Minnehaha, a poem, song, cantata and painting
- Mine-Haha, or On the Bodily Education of Young Girls, a German novella by Frank Wedekind
