= SS Minneapolis =

Several merchant ships have been named SS Minneapolis.

- SS Minneapolis (1873), US propeller, package freighter, Official No. 90524.
- SS Minneapolis (1897), later renamed Burlington, US propeller, package freighter, Official No. 92769.
- SS Minneapolis (1899), UK propeller, ocean liner, Official No. 110515.
