= Samuel David Mercer =

American physician (1841–1907)

- Born: June 13, 1841; Marion County, Illinois, U.S.
- Died: October 10, 1907 (aged 66); Omaha, Nebraska, U.S.
- Burial place: Forest Lawn Cemetery, Omaha, Nebraska, U.S.
- Spouse: Elizabeth Covert Hulst (m. 1870–1906; her death)
- Relatives: Nelson Samuel Mercer (son); Samuel Mercer (grandson)

Samuel David Mercer (June 13, 1841 – October 10, 1907) was a noted American physician from Omaha, Nebraska. He was involved in the construction of Omaha Motor Railway Company, the first electric railway in Omaha, and was for many years the chief surgeon of the Union Pacific.

== Early life ==
Mercer was born in 1841, on a farm in Marion County, Illinois, to Wiley Green Mercer and Cynthia Huff. He was one of their nine known children, alongside Lemuel, Mary Ann, Artimissa, Martha, Wiley Jr., Rachel, Lewis and George.

He attended McKendree College in Lebanon, Illinois, and studied medicine at Chicago Medical College, Berkshire Medical College and the University of Michigan College of Pharmacy.

== Career ==
Mercer served in the American Civil War as assistant surgeon in the 149th Regiment, Illinois Volunteers.

In 1866, after graduating Berkshire Medical College, he relocated to Omaha, Nebraska, to begin medical practice. He also became secretary of the Nebraska Medical Association, vice-president of the American Medical Association and was a co-founder of Omaha Medical College.

In 1868, he helped establish Omaha's first hospital, located at what is now Cass and 26th Streets. It later burned down. He formed Omaha Medical and Surgical Institute, which he ran for many years. He abandoned that venture to become chief surgeon of the Union Pacific Railroad.

From the 1880s until his death, Mercer operated Mercer Chemical Company in Omaha's Old Market district. He also formed, in 1889, Omaha Motor Railway Company, which became a direct competitor of Omaha Street Railway Company. The two later merged.

== Personal life ==
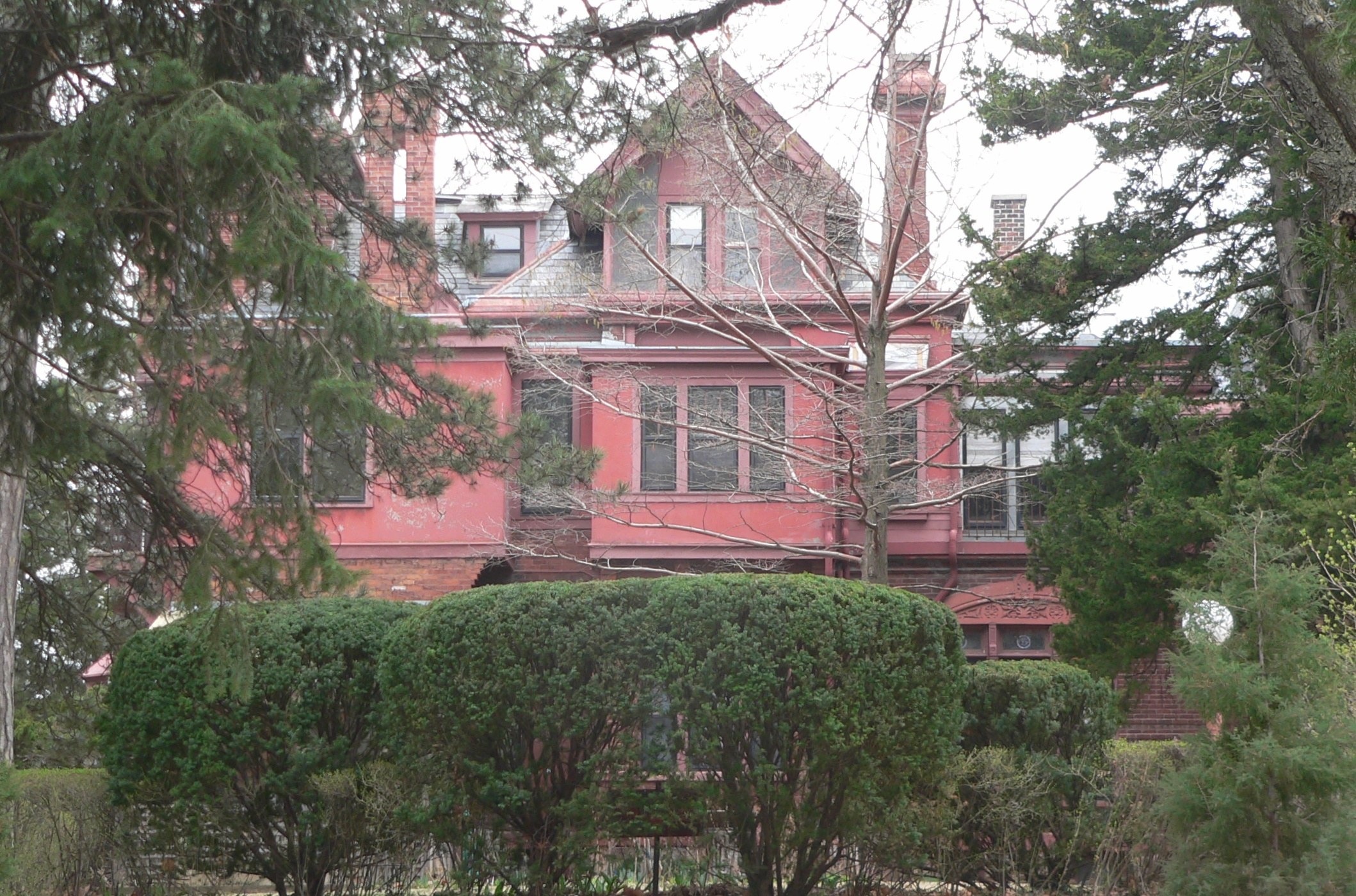
Dr. Samuel D. Mercer House in Omaha, Nebraska

In 1870, Mercer married Elizabeth Covert Hulst at the German Reformed Church in Brooklyn, New York. They had six children: George, Nelson, Emma, Caroline, Mary and Robert. Emma and Robert died in infancy; Carrie drowned, in her early 30s, in 1911, having fallen overboard from the SS Minneapolis. She had been suffering from suicidal mania. Nelson was also a passenger.

In 1855, one of the 75 homes he had built in Omaha's Walnut Hill neighborhood was what is now known as the 23-room Dr. Samuel D. Mercer House, at 3920 Cuming Street. His son Nelson later lived there, and at the time of his death, in 1963, the home had been converted into the Mercer Apartments.

== Death ==
Mercer died in 1907, aged 66. He was interred in Omaha's Forest Lawn Cemetery, alongside his wife, who predeceased him by 17 months.
