= SS Minnetonka (1901) =

British ocean liner, sunk 1918

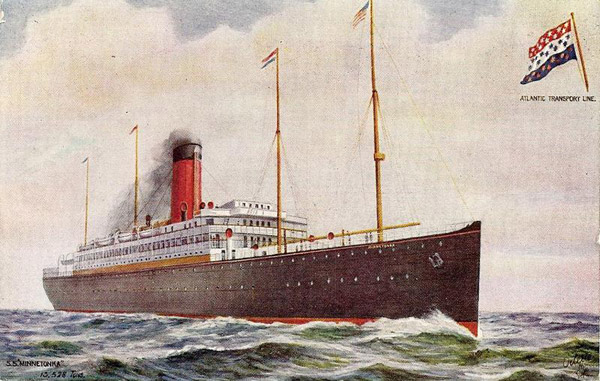
- 1907 postcard of Minnetonka.

History

United Kingdom
- Name: Minnetonka
- Namesake: Minnetonka
- Owner: Atlantic Transport Line
- Port of registry: (United Kingdom of Great Britain and Ireland) Belfast
- Route: London – New York
- Builder: Harland & Wolff
- Yard number: 339
- Way number: 1
- Launched: 12 December 1901
- Completed: 17 May 1902
- Acquired: 17 May 1902
- Maiden voyage: 17 May 1902
- In service: 17 May 1902
- Out of service: 30 January 1918
- Identification: Official number: 113520; Call sign: TJMR
- Fate: Torpedoed and sunk on 30 January 1918

General characteristics
- Class & type: Minne-class ocean liner
- Tonnage: 13,528 GRT
- Length: 182.9 m (600 ft 1 in)
- Beam: 19.8 m (65 ft 0 in)
- Depth: 12.2 m (40 ft 0 in)
- Installed power: Two quadruple-expansion engines
- Propulsion: Double screw propellers
- Speed: 16 knots (30 km/h; 18 mph)
- Capacity: Accommodation for 250 First class passengers
- Notes: Four masts and a single funnel, Two deck guns from 1915 onward

SS Minnetonka was a British transatlantic ocean liner that was torpedoed and sunk on 30 January 1918 by the German submarine U-64 in the Mediterranean Sea 40 nautical miles (74 km) east north east of Malta, while she was travelling from Port Said, Egypt to Marseille, France with a cargo of mail, resulting in the loss of four lives.

== Building ==
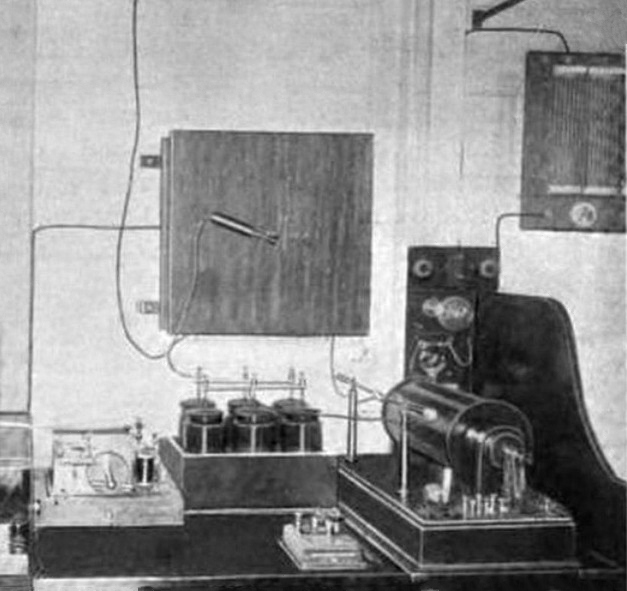
Minnetonka's Marconi wireless room in October 1902.

Minnetonka was built at the Harland & Wolff shipyard in Belfast, United Kingdom and launched on 12 December 1901 before being completed on 17 May 1902. The ship was 182.9 metres (600 ft 1 in) long, with a beam of 19.8 m (65 ft 0 in) and a depth of 12.2 m (40 ft 0 in). The ship was assessed at 13,528 gross register tons (GRT). She had two quadruple-expansion engines rated at 1,227 nominal horsepower, driving two screws which allowed her to achieve a maximum speed of 16 knots (30 km/h; 18 mph). As built, the ship could carry 250 First class passengers and was among the first vessels that was fitted with a wireless Marconi set.

She had six sister ships:

- SS Minnehaha
- SS Minnewaska
- SS Minneapolis
- SS Mongolia
- SS Manchuria
- SS Arabic

== Career ==
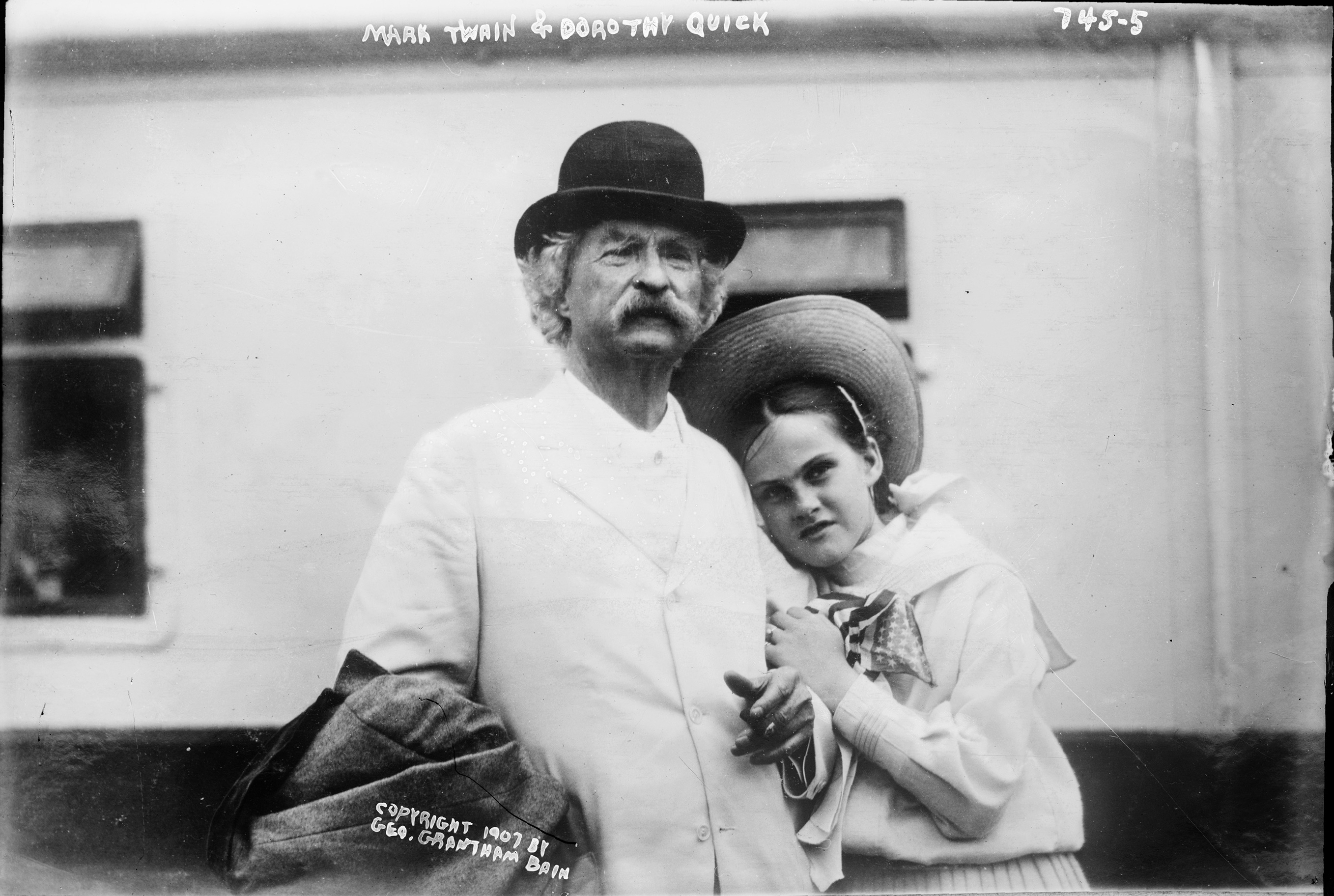
Mark Twain and Dorothy Quick aboard Minnetonka in July 1907.

Minnetonka departed on her maiden voyage from London to New York on 17 May 1902 and arrived at her destination without incident. Following this, Minnetonka would sail this route for the rest of her career. On 13 December 1902, as Minnetonka was sailing from Newport to Boston with a cargo of coal, she ecountered heavy seas and was struck by a rogue wave that damaged her bridge, washed off several of her lifeboats, shifted her cargo and disabled her steering gear. Minnetonka called for aid through her Marconi wireless and was taken in tow by another steamer towards the nearest port in Bermuda. The tow line however, snapped after 12 hours and the crew of Minnetonka managed to repair her steering gear well enough so the ship could reach Bermuda under her own power, where she was subsequently repaired and returned to service. In July 1907, Minnetonka transported American author Mark Twain back to the United States after he had received an honorary doctorate from the University of Oxford. On that voyage, Twain met and developed a lifelong friendship with 9-year-old Dorothy Quick who would later become a novelist and poet herself. Minnetonka conducted her last transatlantic voyage on 31 December 1914, after which the vessel was retired from civilian service.

== World War I and loss ==
The ship was requisitioned by the British Admiralty in May 1915 and refitted for use as an armed auxiliary transport with two deck guns (HMT158) in the ongoing war. Minnetonka was shelled by the German submarine SM U-35 on 2 February 1917 while she was travelling from Marseille to Bizerte under escort of the destroyers Nereide and Sheldrake, but the ships managed to outrun the U-boat and escaped unharmed. SM UC-34 also had Minnetonka in her sights on 24 September 1917 while the ship was travelling from Sicily to Tunisia under escort of the Japanese destroyers Yanagi and Kashi, but the ships once again successfully escaped from the situation unharmed.

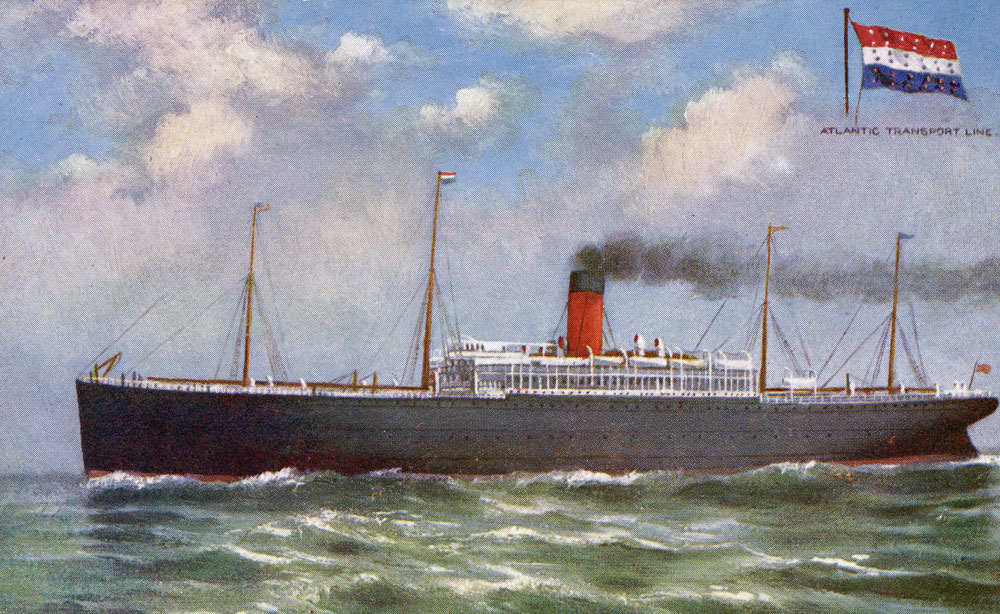
SS Minnetonka in 1907.

On 30 January 1918, as Minnetonka was sailing unescorted from Port Said to Marseille while carrying a cargo of mail, she was spotted by the German submarines SM U-64 and SM UC-67. At 4.43 pm, U-64 fired two torpedoes at Minnetonka without warning, one of which struck the ship, damaging her but not by enough to sink her. At 5 pm, U-64 fired another torpedo at the ship and at 5.10 pm, UC-67 surfaced and used her deck gun to fire ten shells at Minnetonka. The damage proved enough to sink Minnetonka with the loss of four of her 173 crewmen. Of the 169 survivors, ten were taken as prisoners of war by U-64 and transferred to UC-67 to be taken to Germany.

== Wreck ==
The wreck was discovered 23 nautical miles south of Portopalo di Capo Passero at a depth of 120 meters by Fabio Portella and his team.

== Bibliography ==
- Haws, Duncan (1979). The Ships of the Cunard, American, Red Star, Inman, Leyland, Dominion, Atlantic Transport and White Star lines. Merchant Fleets in Profile. Vol. 2. Cambridge: Patrick Stephens Ltd. ISBN 0-85059-324-7.
- Lloyd's Register of British and Foreign Shipping. Vol. I.–Steamers. London: Lloyd's Register of Shipping. 1910 – via Internet Archive.
- The Marconi Press Agency Ltd (1913). The Year Book of Wireless Telegraphy and Telephony. London: The St Katherine Press.

36°12′N 14°55′E
