= SS Minnewaska (1908) =

British ocean liner, sunk 1916

History

United Kingdom
- Name: Minnewaska
- Owner: Atlantic Transport Line
- Port of registry: Belfast
- Route: London – New York
- Builder: Harland & Wolff
- Yard number: 397
- Launched: 12 November 1908
- Completed: 24 April 1909
- Maiden voyage: 1 May 1909
- Identification: UK official number 124674; code letters HNTB; by 1913: wireless call sign MMW
- Fate: Beached after being mined 1916. Scrapped in situ 1918.

General characteristics
- Class & type: Minne-class ocean liner
- Tonnage: 14,317 GRT, 8,878 NRT
- Length: 600.3 ft (183.0 m)
- Beam: 65.4 ft (19.9 m)
- Depth: 39.6 ft (12.1 m)
- Decks: 4 + shelter deck
- Installed power: 2 × quadruple-expansion engines; 1,222 NHP
- Propulsion: 2 × screws
- Speed: 16 knots (30 km/h)
- Capacity: 1,800 passengers, including 340 1st class
- Crew: 200
- Sensors & processing systems: submarine signalling

SS Minnewaska was a British ocean liner that was one of the ships that assisted RMS Carpathia with sending out survivors names following the 1912 RMS Titanic disaster. In 1916, she hit a mine laid by SM UC-23 in the Mediterranean Sea 1.5 nautical miles (2.8 km) southeast of Dentero Point, Suda Bay, Crete, while she was travelling from Alexandria, Egypt to Saloniki with 1,600 troops.

== Building ==
Minnewaska was built in 1908 at the Harland & Wolff shipyard in Belfast, United Kingdom. She was launched on 12 November 1908, and completed in 1909. Her registered length was 600.3 ft (183.0 m), her beam was 65.4 ft (19.9 m), and her depth was 39.6 ft (12.1 m). Her tonnages were 14,317 GRT and 8,878 NRT. She had two screws, each driven by a quadruple-expansion engine. The combined power of her twin engines was rated at 1,222 NHP, and gave her a speed of 16 knots (30 km/h).

She had six sister ships:

- SS Minnehaha
- SS Minnetonka
- SS Minneapolis
- SS Mongolia
- SS Manchuria
- SS Arabic

== Accidents ==
In her career as an ocean liner and transport ship, Minnewaska had a few accidents.

In late April 1911, 19-year-old seaman J. W. Browning fell overboard when his lifeline broke while he was working on the lifeboats. According to The New York Times, he fell 18 metres from the speeding liner, and had to swim desperately in his sea boots to avoid being drawn into her screws. Within a few seconds after the alarm, Minnewaska had turned a wide circle to port, and was heading back over her course. A boat commanded by Chief Officer James Grant Hutchison was soon lowered, and Browning was brought back aboard, 13 minutes after his fall, but without his boots.

In October 1914, while Minnewaska was taking on cargo in New York, fire broke out in hold number two, where a consignment of sugar had been loaded. It was extinguished by flooding the hold. The fire destroyed sugar worth $120,000, and there was concern that it may have been deliberately set by German agents. However, it seems to have been an accident, and Captain Thomas F. Gates blamed spontaneous combustion. Minnewaska was not materially damaged, and sailed on schedule without further incident.

On 28 April 1915, Minnewaska was at the Gallipoli landings, and was involved in a minor collision with SS Derfflinger off ANZAC Cove.

== World War I ==
Minnewaska had made 66 voyages from London to New York between May 1909 and January 1915. She was requisitioned by the British Government for service in World War I as a troopship. She sailed the Avonmouth – Alexandria route during this period in her career. She was defensively armed with a naval gun mounted on her stern, and made five voyages taking troops and artillery to the Dardanelles. She had some narrow escapes involving submarines.

=== Sinking ===
On 29 November 1916, while she was travelling from Alexandria, Egypt to Thessaloniki with 1,600 troops, she struck a floating mine 1 1/2 nautical miles (3 km) southeast of Dentero Point, Suda Bay, Crete which blew a hole in the hull. She took on a rapidly increasing list, and threatened to capsize, but Captain Gates, who ordered everyone into their life belts and had lifeboats and rafts at the ready, managed to keep control of the ship, and decided to steam at full speed to the nearby shore. He successfully ran her aground 46 metres west of Cape Deutero at the entrance to Suda Bay where she came to rest. It took about two hours to evacuate the ship. The men were rescued without loss by the trawler Danestone; drifters Principal, Trustful and Deveronside; and destroyer HMS Grampus. Due to Captain Gates' prompt action, there was no loss of life among the 1,800 soldiers and 200 sailors aboard at the time. He was subsequently awarded the Order of the British Empire for his actions.

=== Aftermath ===
Minnewaska′s bottom had been torn away by the mine, and she was abandoned on the beach where she lay. Two years later, she was sold to Italian shipbreakers for scrap. She was broken up on site, but some parts of her wreck remain on the site to this day.

== Bibliography ==
- Haws, Duncan (1979). The Ships of the Cunard, American, Red Star, Inman, Leyland, Dominion, Atlantic Transport and White Star lines. Merchant Fleets in Profile. Vol. 2. Cambridge: Patrick Stephens Ltd. ISBN 0-85059-324-7.
- Lloyd's Register of British and Foreign Shipping. Vol. I.–Steamers. London: Lloyd's Register of Shipping. 1910 – via Internet Archive.
- The Marconi Press Agency Ltd (1913). The Year Book of Wireless Telegraphy and Telephony. London: The St Katherine Press.
