= Walnut Hill (Omaha) =

Neighborhood of Omaha, Nebraska, United States

Coordinates: 41°16′12″N 95°58′41″W

Walnut Hill is a historic neighborhood located in north Omaha, Nebraska. It is bounded by North 40th Street on the east, Cuming Street on the south, Northwest Radial Highway and Saddle Creek Road on the west and Hamilton Street on the north.

== History ==
Dr. Samuel David Mercer constructed a large, private residence at 40th and Cuming Streets and platted the Walnut Hill subdivision northwest of his home in the 1880s. Previously, Mercer financed the construction of cable-line streetcars in Omaha, and by the end of the 1880s, his line extended as far west as North 36th and Cuming Streets.

Walnut Hill Elementary School was first constructed in 1888, rebuilt in 1927 and again in 1994. It is one of Omaha's oldest schools. The neighborhood suffered minor damage in the catastrophic Easter Sunday Tornado of 1913.

After the Trans-Mississippi Exposition of 1898 many of the large streetcars employed to carry throngs of passengers were removed from service by the Omaha and Council Bluffs Railway and Bridge Company. In the face of increasingly uncomfortable crowding on the small cars, a large demonstration by a group of residents from the Walnut Hill suburb during which they took over several streetcars in the city to protest the poor condition of public transportation in their neighborhood.

== Notable historic properties ==
Historic properties in the West Farnam neighborhood in alphabetical order
Name	Address	Built	Notes
Dr. Samuel D. Mercer House	3920 Cuming Street	1885	Queen Anne style
Walnut Hill Pumping Station	40th and Nicolas	1882	
Walnut Hill Elementary School	4355 Charles Street	1926	

== See also ==
- Neighborhoods in Omaha, Nebraska
