= Isaac Russell =

Leader in the early Latter Day Saint movement (1807–1844)

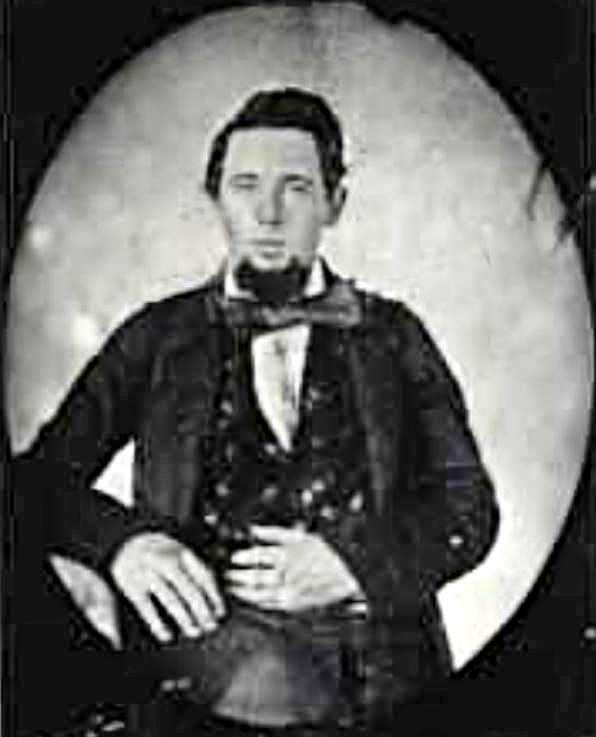
- Early image of Isaac Russell

Founder of the Alston Church
- 1839 – 1844

Personal details
- Born: April 7, 1807; Windy Haugh, Cumberland, England
- Died: September 25, 1844 (aged 37); Richmond, Missouri, US
- Cause of death: Swamp Fever
- Resting place: Woodward Farm
- Spouse(s): Mary Millican Walton
- Parents: William Russell; Isabella Peart

Isaac Russell (April 13, 1807 – September 25, 1844) was a leader in the early Latter Day Saint movement. Russell held a number of positions of responsibility, including being one of the first missionaries to England, with Heber C. Kimball, Willard Richards, Orson Hyde, Joseph Fielding, and J. E. Goodson. He also organized the Alston Church in 1837.

== Early life ==
Isaac Russell was born at Windy Haugh, near Alston, Cumberland, England, to William Russell and Isabella Peart. He was the youngest of thirteen children. In 1817 the family emigrated from England to Upper Canada.

== Latter Day Saint movement ==
Russell and his family were baptized into the Church of the Latter Day Saints on May 21, 1836, by Parley P. Pratt, along with the families of John Taylor, Joseph Fielding, and others. Russell joined the body of the Latter Day Saints in Kirtland, Ohio, in 1837.

=== Alston Church ===
As the Latter Day Saints were fleeing Missouri in the winter of 1838–39, Russell claimed to have received revelations directing him to remain in Missouri by leading the church into Indian Territory, where the Three Nephites would join them to convert the Lamanites. He was alleged to have said that Joseph Smith had "fallen" and that he, Isaac, was now the prophet.

Russell wrote letters to those he had converted in Alston, England, secretly telling them of his new beliefs and plans, trying to persuade them to join him. His organization was called the Alston Church. However, the Alston, England church members were visited by apostle Willard Richards, who convinced them of Russell's apostacy, and they remained faithful to the main body of the church.

On April 26, 1839, Russell, along with most, if not all, of his Missouri followers were excommunicated.

The majority of Russell's followers in Missouri left him and rejoined the main church body in Nauvoo, Illinois, with one group departing from Far West, Missouri on May 18, 1840.

== Death ==
Russell stayed in Far West, among anti-Mormon mobs, never rejoined the Latter Day Saints, and died in 1844 on his farm near Richmond, Missouri, of "swamp fever." His youngest child, Isabella Russell, born a year before his death, later wrote his biography. Isaac's widow Mary Russell and their children never denied their faith in Joseph Smith and were never excommunicated. In 1861, after saving enough money, they moved to Salt Lake City, Utah Territory and lived among friends and family in the Latter-day Saint community.
