= Blake & Zander =

American architect

Practice information
- Key architects: Joseph Stillman Blake; Ozias M. Zander
- Founded: 1890
- Dissolved: 1895 (130 years ago)
- Location: Omaha, Nebraska, U.S.

Significant works and honors
- Design: Murray Hotel, Omaha (1888); Rocco Brothers Building, Omaha (1895); Emery House, Omaha; P. G. Karbach & Sons Carriage Factory, Omaha; Boyd's Opera House, Omaha

Blake & Zander was a leading firm of American architects, based in Omaha, Nebraska, active in the 19th century, albeit a short-lived practice.

From 1890 to 1895, the firm consisted of two carpenter-builders, Joseph Stillman Blake (1835–1898) and Ozias M. Zander (1848–1940). The two had separately pursued architecture as a profession prior to their moving to Omaha in the late 19th century. Blake, a Vermont native, arrived via Des Moines, Iowa, in 1887, at which time he formed Blake, Miller & Company, which became Blake & Company the following year. Zander, who hailed from Milwaukee, arrived in 1890, and a partnership with Blake was formed on November 13. In 1892, its office was at 519 New York Life Building in Omaha.

Blake died in Omaha on July 1, 1898, aged 63. He was buried in the city's Forest Lawn Cemetery.

Zander died in Tacoma, Washington, on October 31, 1940, aged 92. He is buried in the city's Acacia Memorial Park.

== List of selected works ==
- Murray Hotel, Omaha (1888) – by Blake & Company
- P. G. Karbach & Sons Carriage Factory, 1501 Howard Street, Omaha (c. 1892)
- Rocco Brothers Building, 511 S 11th Street, Omaha – now on the National Register of Historic Places
- Emery House, 204 S 12th Street, Omaha. Its proprietor was J. T. Emery
- Boyd's Opera House, Omaha
