= Cedric Hartman =

American designer

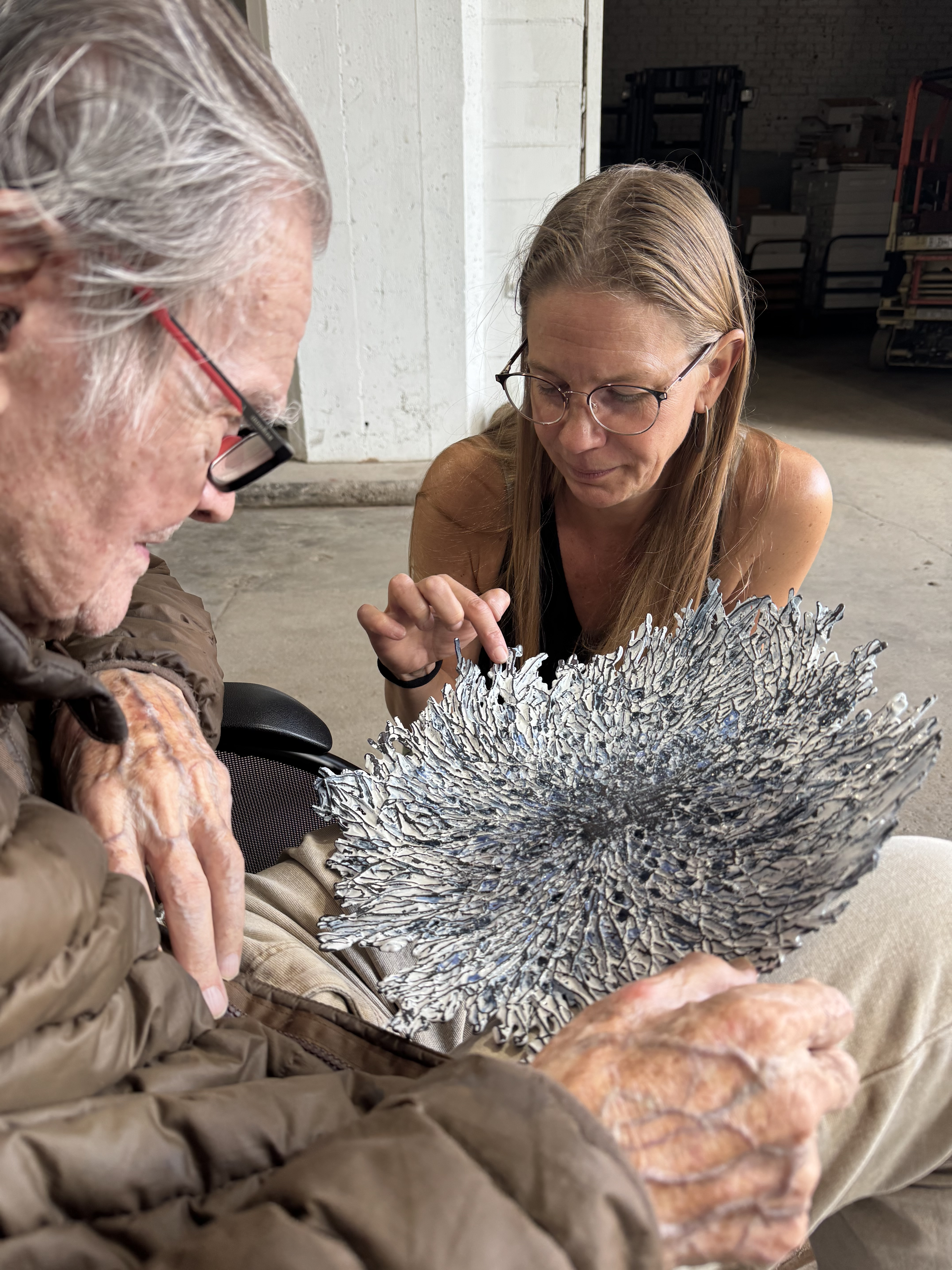
- Hartman (left) in 2025
- Born: 1929 (age 96–97); Lincoln, Nebraska, U.S.
- Occupation: Designer
- Website: cedrichartman.com

Cedric Hartman is an American designer, noted for his work with lamps and other interior furnishings.

== Early life ==
Hartman was born in Lincoln, Nebraska, in 1929. He began working as an architect after World War II, although that career was interrupted by his serving in the Korean War.

== Career ==
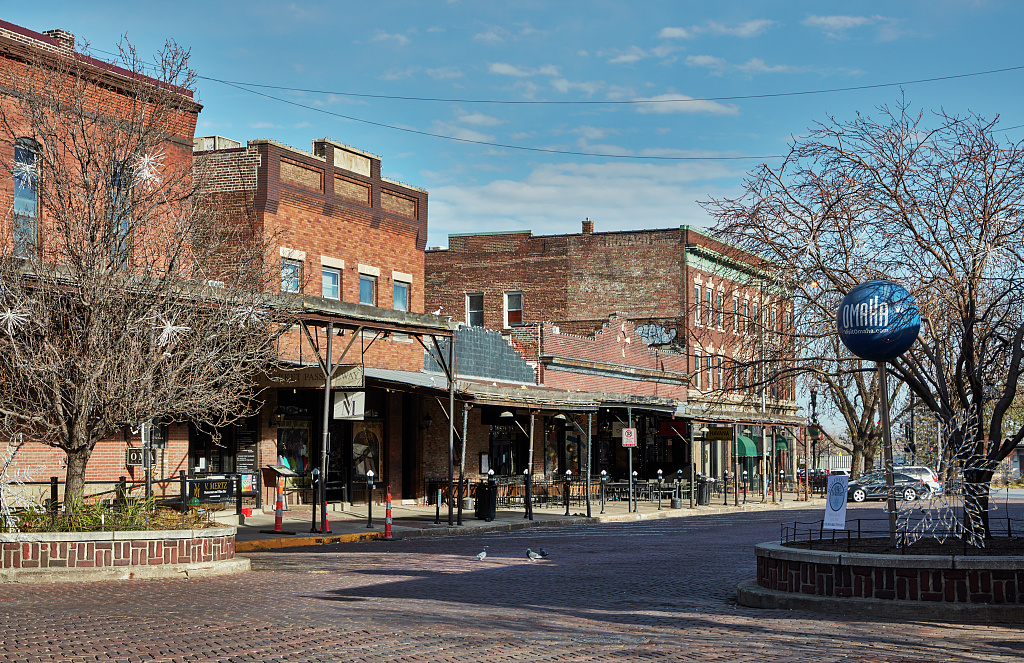
Part of the Old Market in Omaha, Nebraska

After returning from war service, Hartman lived in Chicago, where he became inspired by the artistic offerings, before going off to study at Sorbonne University in Paris. He also lived in New York City, but returned to Nebraska after a family illness, settling in Omaha. There, he established a design career which lasted over 60 years. Two of his lamps, designed in 1966, are now in New York's Museum of Modern Art's permanent collection.

Hartman played a key role in the restoration of old buildings which became Omaha's popular Old Market district. In the early 1960s, he observed a group of vacant buildings (circa 1876–1905) which once housed Omaha's bustling fruit and vegetable market. Preservationist Sam Mercer recalls in his book that Hartman said he would like to establish a decorating store in one of the buildings if Mercer would undertake a renovation of the whole market area. He suggested Mercer purchase the buildings he did not own so that there was a control of design and occupancy and consistency of store fronts.
