= Jarvis Offutt =

American aviator

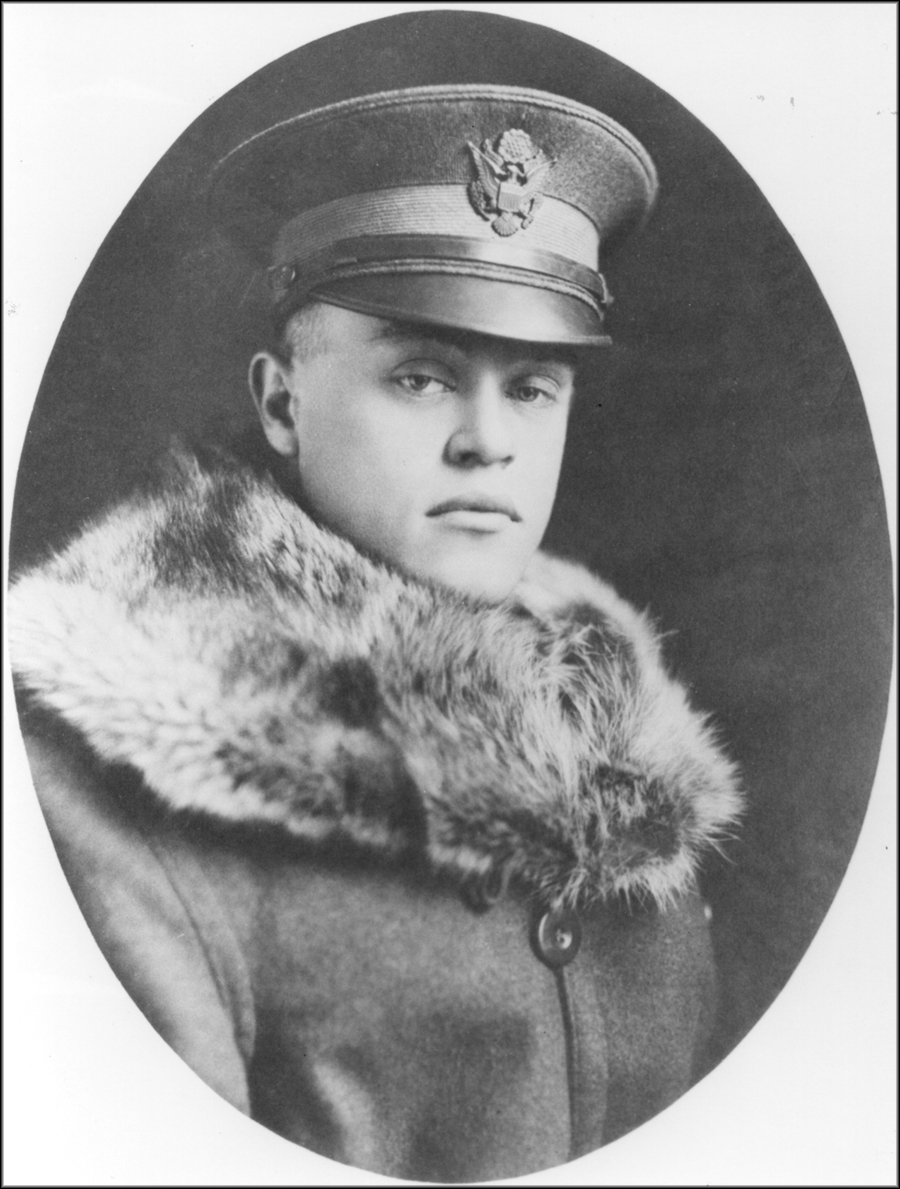
- Born: Jarvis Jenness Offutt; October 26, 1894; Omaha, Nebraska
- Died: August 13, 1918 (aged 23); Valheureux, France
- Burial place: Forest Lawn Memorial Park; Omaha, Nebraska
- Military career
- Allegiance: United States
- Branch: U.S. Army Air Service
- Service years: 1916–1918
- Rank: First lieutenant
- Unit: No. 56 Squadron RAF (attached)

First Lieutenant Jarvis Jenness Offutt (October 26, 1894 – August 13, 1918) was an American aviator from Omaha, Nebraska, who died in World War I. Offutt Air Force Base is named in his honor.

== Early life ==
Born and raised in Omaha, Offutt was the younger son of Bertha (née Yost) and Charles Offutt. Charles (1856–1898) was an attorney and a former speaker of the Kentucky General Assembly, from Bourbon County. He relocated to Omaha in 1888 and married four years later.

The middle of three children, Jarvis had an older brother (Casper) and a younger sister (Virginia). He attended Central High School and graduated from the Lawrenceville Preparatory School in New Jersey in 1913. He went to college at Yale University in Connecticut and graduated in 1917.

Offutt was a member of Yale's Varsity Club, Glee Club, Alpha Delta Phi fraternity, and was a track man, winning his honors in the high hurdles. He was also inducted into Phi Beta Kappa society, an organization which recognizes high academic achievement.

== Military career ==
While at Yale in 1916, Offutt served as a company supply sergeant for the Yale Field Artillery on a summer deployment to Tobyhanna, Pennsylvania. Later in 1916, he entered officer training at Fort Snelling, Minnesota, but after a month he asked to be transferred to aviation. He was one of 300 candidates sent from the United States to Canada to be trained by the Royal Flying Corps Canada. Offutt was then sent to Fort Worth, Texas, where he received his commission as a first lieutenant in the aviation section of the U.S. Army Signal Corps in November 1916. He afterwards assigned to the 22nd Aero Squadron and after more training boarded transport L501 (the S.S. Adriatic) on 31 January 1918 with the squadron bound for Liverpool, England.

Upon its arrival the Squadron continued further training, after which he was assigned duties as a ferry pilot attached to the Royal Flying Corps. In August 1918, he was transferred to the front line (most likely to No. 60 Squadron, of the newly-renamed Royal Air Force, from which he was posted to No. 56 Squadron, RAF). As a ferry pilot, Offutt's duties were to deliver aircraft fresh from the factories and from holding fields in England to bases at the front in France. In the course of these duties, he crossed the English Channel almost daily.

== Death ==
On 12 August 1918, 23-year-old Lieutenant Offutt was transferred to 56 Squadron. The next day, he died from injuries while flying at Valheureux, France. Offutt was killed in a crash while practicing an aggressive maneuver in an S.E.5 and became Omaha's first air casualty. Unfortunately, his journey home was extended, as he was mistakenly buried as Private Walter Heltman in Connellsville, Pennsylvania. In December 1923, he was reinterred in the family plot at Forest Lawn Memorial Park in Omaha.

== Legacy ==
Six years after his death in 1924, the landing field at Fort Crook, south of Omaha at Bellevue, was renamed Offutt Field in his honor. The dedication ceremony on May 10, attended by Offutt's mother and brother Casper, featured an aerial salute from nineteen planes which circled the field; Major Charles Tinker commanded seven of the planes which flew from Fort Riley, Kansas, and dropped a dedicatory wreath to highlight the ceremony.

In 1948, both the airfield and Fort Crook were renamed Offutt Air Force Base on January 13; it became the headquarters for the Strategic Air Command (SAC) that November, which was succeeded in 1992 by Strategic Command.
