= Dorothy Quick =

American novelist and poet

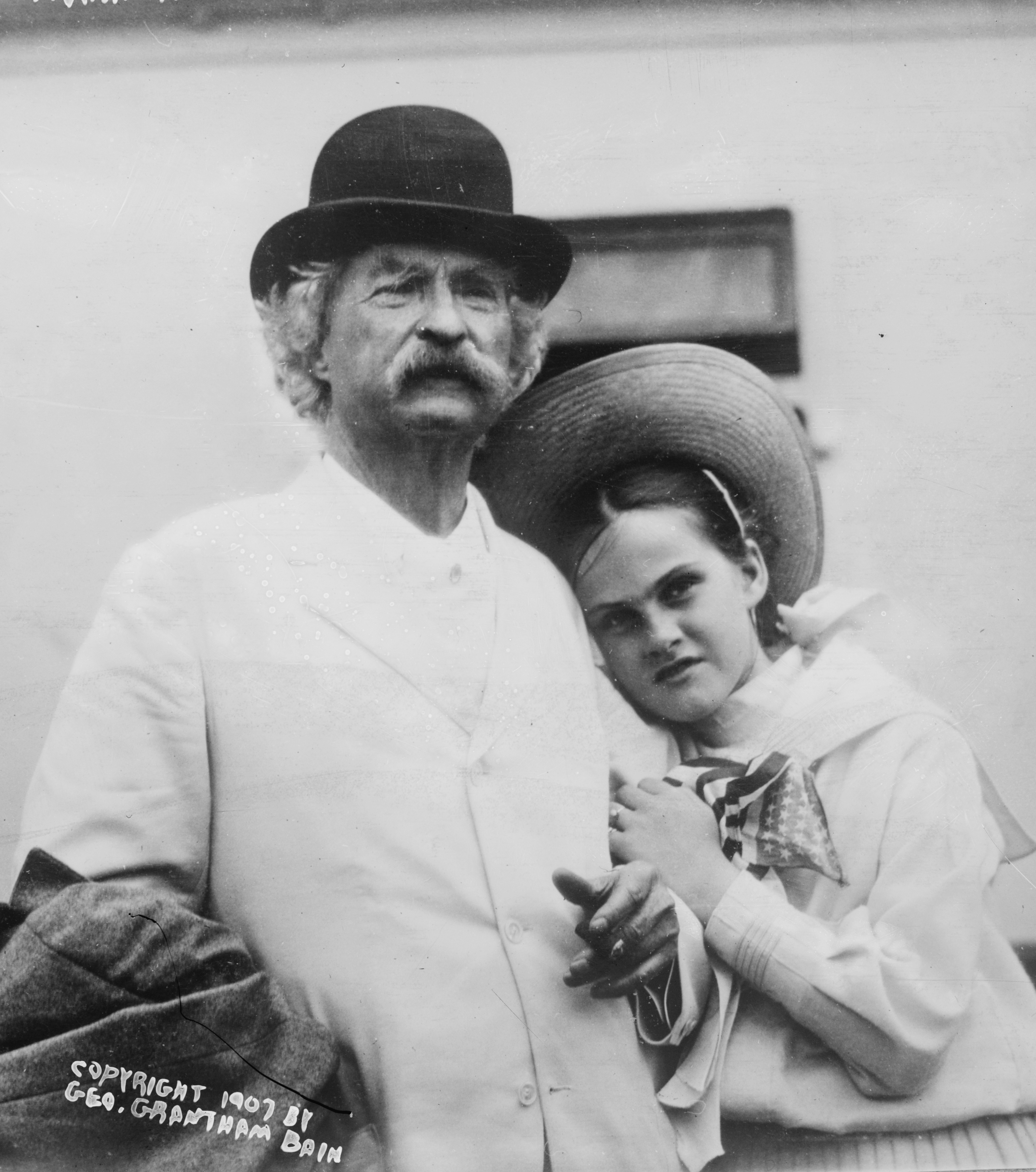
- Dorothy Quick (right) with Mark Twain
- Born: September 1, 1896
- Died: March 15, 1962 (aged 65)
- Occupations: poet, novelist
- Writing career
- Genres: science fiction, fantasy, horror, mystery, cozy mystery

Dorothy Gertrude Quick Mayer (September 1, 1896 – March 15, 1962) was an American novelist and poet.

== Early life ==
Dorothy Gertrude Quick was born on September 1, 1896, in Brooklyn, the only child of Henry Stanhope Quick Jr. (1867–1935) and Emma Gertrude Aaron (1875–1942). She attended the Plainfield Seminary in Plainfield, New Jersey.

As a child, Quick met celebrated author Mark Twain aboard the SS Minnetonka en route to America in the summer of 1907. They formed a friendship on the vessel, playing numerous games of shuffleboard – which Twain called "horse billiards", and appointed her his "business manager". Their friendship even spawned numerous newspaper stories upon landing in New York, and continued through numerous visits and letters over the next three years, with Twain encouraging and advising Quick on her wish to become an author. For her birthday in 1907, Twain sent her a telegram that read:

I tried to get some elephants for your birthday but they charge ten thousand dollars apiece, 3 for twenty-five thousand, I can get one elephant & sixteen hundred monkeys for the same money if you prefer.

Twain died in 1910. Near the end of her life, Quick published Enchantment: A Little Girl's Friendship With Mark Twain (1961), republished as Mark Twain and Me (1999). Her story was later dramatized as the film Mark Twain and Me (1991) with Jason Robards as Twain and Amy Stewart as Quick.

== Career ==
Much of Quick's work was in the genres of science fiction, fantasy, or horror, starting with the story "Scented Gardens" in Oriental Stories in 1932. She was one of the most frequent contributors of short stories and poems in Weird Tales starting in the 1930s, including the story "Strange Orchids", about a carnivorous plant that consumes a woman from the inside out. Her series of "Patchwork Quilt" stories about a quilt which conveys the user through time, appeared in Unknown in 1939 and 1940. She wrote a planetary romance novel, Strange Awakening (1938), about a woman transported to Venus who helps a rebel prince overthrow a tyrannical psychic mind that rules the planet.

She wrote fifteen books of both poetry and novels, including numerous mystery novels. The Fifth Dagger (1947) was the first of a series of cozy mystery novels featuring Diana Blakeley and her husband, psychologist Allen Blakeley.

In 1925 she married John Adams Mayer. He died in 1940. Dorothy Gertrude Quick Mayer died on March 15, 1962, in East Hampton, New York.

== Bibliography ==
=== Novels ===
- Strange Awakening (1938)
- The Fifth Dagger (1947)
- Something Evil (1958)
- Cry in the Night (1959)
- Too Strange a Hand (1959)
- The Doctor Looks at Murder (1959)

=== Poetry ===
- Threads (1927)
- Changing Winds (1935)
- Spears into Life (1938)
- To What Strange Altar (1940)
- Variations on a Theme (1947)
- Laugh While You Can (1947)
- Interludes (1953)
- Bold Heart, and Other Poems (1960)

=== Nonfiction ===
- Enchantment: A Little Girl's Friendship With Mark Twain (1961) republished as Mark Twain and Me (1999)

=== Plays ===
- One Night in Holyrood (1949)
