= Forest Lawn Memorial Park (Omaha, Nebraska) =

Cemetery in Omaha, Nebraska, United States

Coordinates: 41°19′42″N 95°58′55″W

Forest Lawn Memorial Park, also known as Forest Lawn Cemetery, is located at 7909 Mormon Bridge Road in North Omaha, Nebraska. It was established in 1885 when the mutual Forest Lawn Cemetery Association was donated 100 acres (0.40 km^{2}) in northwest of the city. In 1886, the first interment in the cemetery was the donor of the land, John H. Brackin. Forest Lawn is Omaha's largest cemetery and the burial location of many of Omaha's second generation of leadership.

== History ==
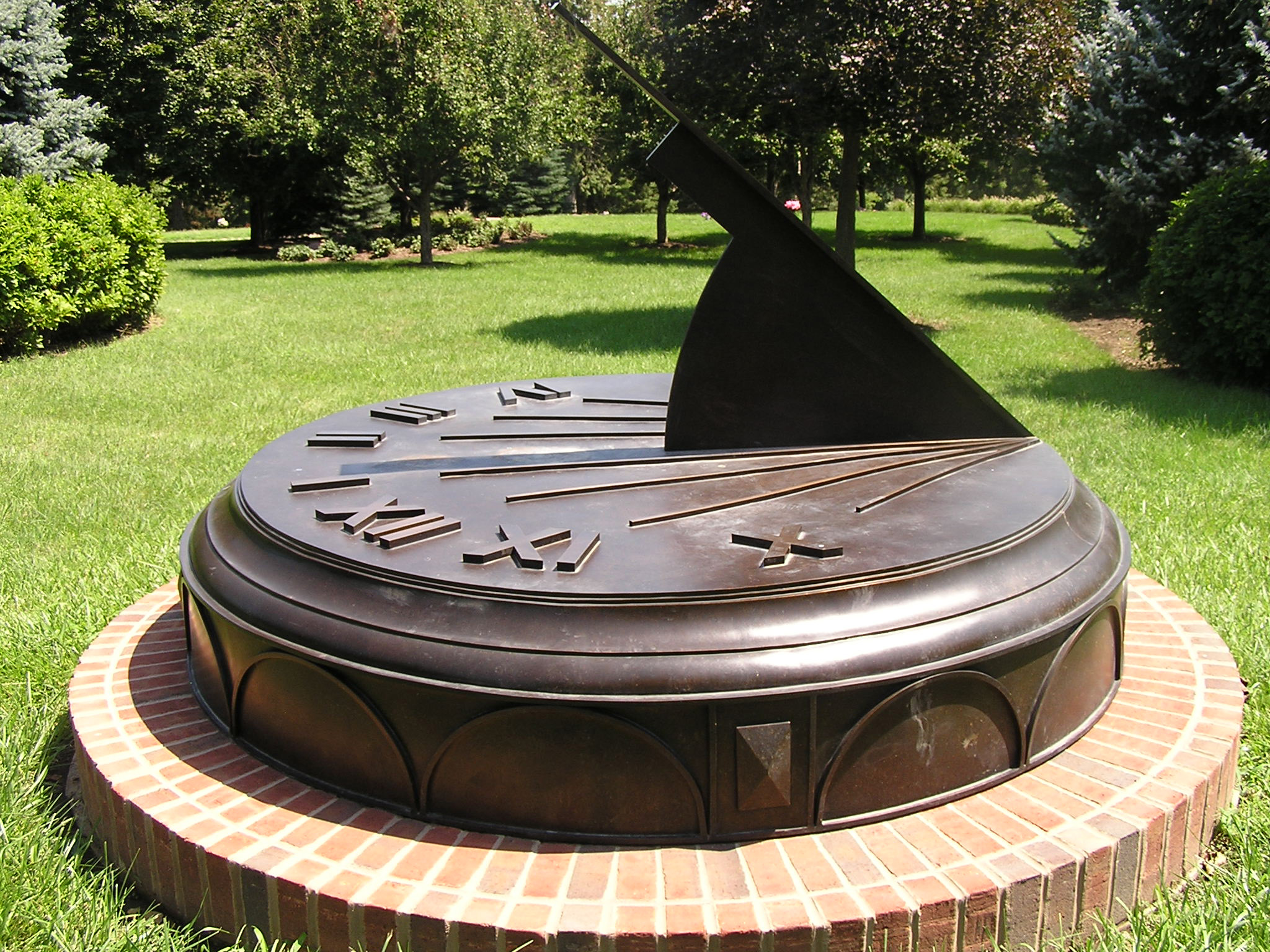
Forest Lawn Sundial designed by John Carmichael at Sundial Sculptures

Before Forest Lawn Cemetery was founded, the northwest corner of the property was used as a Potter's Field for poor people and people whose identities were not known. It was used from at least the 1880s through the 1960s.

The present area of 349 acres (1.41 km^{2}) is designed according to a park-type plan, with rolling hills, forests and lawns. Historic Omaha family names are scattered throughout the cemetery, along with veterans from the Civil, Spanish–American, and World Wars I and II, as well as Korea, Vietnam, Gulf and Iraq Wars.

The G.A.R., the Freemasons, and the Omaha Typographical Union owned parts of Forest Lawn Cemetery, and part of Forest Lawn was made into a national soldiers' cemetery. Income from the land, as it is sold, continues to be used for protecting, preserving, and embellishing the cemetery.

Soon after Forest Lawn was opened, Omaha's pioneer burying place, Prospect Hill Cemetery, stopped being used. Shortly thereafter Prospect Hill's owner, Byron Reed, sold it to Forest Lawn in the 1890s. That Cemetery soon fell into disrepair, and was only redeemed in the 1980s.

Forest Lawn Memorial Park has been the location of several notable historic buildings, including a chapel, mausoleum, caretaker's residence, lagoon and bridge, and two large greenhouses. Several of these structures have been demolished, except the chapel and mausoleum. The organization has also constructed several new buildings since 2014.

== Notable interments ==
- Howard Malcolm Baldrige, U.S. Secretary of Commerce
- Kimera Bartee, baseball player and coach
- Joseph Stillman Blake, architect with Blake & Zander
- James E. Boyd, Mayor of Omaha, Governor of Nebraska
- Norris Brown
- Howard Homan Buffett, father of Warren Buffett
- Hugh Alfred Butler
- Caroline Augusta Clowry (G. Estabrook), first American woman to publish an opera
- Harry Buffington Coffee
- Tom Dennison, Omaha political boss
- Richard A. Dier, judge
- Henry Doorly, publisher of Omaha World-Herald
- Experience Estabrook
- J.E. Goodson, 19th century musician
- Gilbert Hitchcock, U.S. Senator and founder of Omaha World-Herald
- Robert Beecher Howell
- Albert Webb Jefferis
- David Knox, Civil War photographer
- Herman Kountze
- Jesse Lowe, first mayor of Omaha
- Charles Frederick Manderson
- John McDonald, architect and designer of the cemetery's chapel
- David Henry Mercer
- Samuel David Mercer, physician
- Jarvis Offutt, World War I aviator, namesake of Offutt Air Force Base
- Anne Ramsey, actress
- Samuel Williams Reynolds
- Alvin Saunders
- Walter Scott Jr.
- John Lee Webster

== See also ==
- History of Omaha
- List of cemeteries in Omaha
