= John Mercer =

John Mercer is the name of:

- Captain John Mercer (died 1756), colonial Virginia militiaman killed at the Battle of Great Cacapon
- John Mercer (colonial lawyer) (1704–1768), colonial Virginia lawyer
- John Francis Mercer (1759–1821), American Governor of Maryland, 1801–1803, son of the Virginia lawyer
- John H. Mercer (1922–1987), American Ohio State University glaciologist
- John Mercer (scientist) (1791–1866), British textile chemist
- John Mercer (Australian pastoralist) (1823–1891), Australian landowner, pastoralist and politician in colonial Victoria
- John Mercer (baseball) (1892–1982), American Major League Baseball first baseman
- John Mercer (archaeologist) (1934–1982), British archaeologist and author
- John Mercer (American politician) (born 1957), American legislator in the state of Montana
- John Mercer (photojournalist) (born 1949), New Zealand photographer and photojournalist
- Johnny Mercer (1909–1976), American songwriter
- Johnny Mercer (politician) (born 1981), British politician
- Jack Mercer (1910–1984), American animator and voice actor
- Jack Mercer (cricketer) (1893–1987), British cricketer for Glamorgan
- Jack Mercer (baseball) (1889–1945), Major League Baseball pitcher

== See also ==
- John Mercer Langston (1829-1897), American abolitionist, attorney, educator, activist, diplomat, and politician
