= J. E. Goodson =

John Edward Goodson
- Born: March 24, 1808; Clerkenwell, London, U.K.
- Died: March 2, 1892 (aged 83) St. Louis, Missouri, US
- Genre: Classical music
- Occupations: Composer, conductor, music educator

John Edward Goodson (1808 – 1892) was a 19th-century North American classical music educator, performer, composer, and conductor. Goodson, a highly skilled pianist and organist, was born and raised in London, England, and received his early education at the St. Paul's Cathedral School. The son of a London shoemaker, he fled the cholera epidemic of 1832–33 and emigrated to York, Upper Canada. After immigrating to the United States, he met Ralph Waldo Emerson while living and teaching music in Cincinnati, and was eventually lured to Boston by Emerson for a brief time. It was during this time that Goodson became the conductor of the Handel and Haydn Society. He was also mentioned in Emerson's notes about forming a "Boston Club" along with Nathaniel Hawthorne and Bronson Alcott. After leaving Boston in 1852, he lived out most of the remainder of his days in St. Louis, Missouri, continuing to teach music and also continuing to write and perform publicly. While unproven, it has been passed down within the family that Goodson was a direct descendant of Vice-Admiral William Goodson, one of Oliver Cromwell's Admirals during the Protectorate. It is quite possible that the memoirs of his Grandfather, William Goodson of Waddesdon, Buckinghamshire, may shed some more light on it.

== Early life, family, and education ==
Goodson was born in Clerkenwell, London, England, on March 24, 1808, the youngest child of Henry Goodson Sr. (a shoemaker) and Ann (Goldsmith) Goodson. Goodson and his family were religious non-conformists and were members of the Countess of Huntingdon's Connexion. By the time Goodson was 10 years of age, he and his family had moved to the Bloomsbury area of London. His father had a shop on Little Russell Street near the present day Charles Dickens Museum. In September 1818, when Goodson was 10 years of age, he began attending St. Paul's Cathedral School. Goodson's early education in music at St. Paul's would become a building block for his lifelong musical pursuits.

== Early adulthood ==
On December 26, 1829, Goodson married Emma Jane Clark (b. 1806) at St Anne's Church, Soho. Emma was the third daughter of Richard Clark, the well known Musical Antiquary b. 1780 in Datchet. In 1832, they would have their first child, a girl named Emma, but she would die during a particularly bad cholera outbreak in 1832. Just a few weeks later, Goodson and Emma fled the cholera epidemic and settled in York, Upper Canada. Goodson's mother, father, and brother all died in the London cholera epidemics. Upon arriving in York, Goodson was immediately faced with another cholera epidemic, one which would take the life of his wife, Emma (recent research has shown an Emma Goodson living at St George the Martyr, Southwark, London, in the 1841 Census her occupation being 'Musical Professor'. She is living here with her brother in law, James Adcock, and her elder sister Sophia Louise Adcock- née Clark). Historical documents estimate that this particular epidemic killed approximately 1,000 people. Given the population of York at the time, all families must have been affected. A grief-stricken Goodson agreed to perform at the first public bazaar in York on December 27, 1833. The bazaar was organized in order to obtain relief funds for the families of those killed by the cholera epidemic. His performance, the singing of a song entitled "Raven Plume", was a song specifically written for the bazaar. The song, a romance from a Welsh legendary tale, was composed by I. W. Cawdell, who later was librarian and secretary to The Law Society of Upper Canada at Osgoode Hall.

== Mormon years ==
It was during 1836 that Goodson became associated with the Latter Day Saint movement. The Mormons had sent a missionary, Parley P. Pratt, into Upper Canada to minister and establish a new branch of the Church of the Latter Day Saints. It was during this time that Goodson received the word of the Mormons and was subsequently baptized in the Black Creek near Charleston Settlement. Others baptized that day included a good friend, John Taylor, who would later become the third president of the Church of Jesus Christ of Latter-day Saints (LDS Church), and Margaret Dawson, who would become Goodson's second wife. Also during 1836, Goodson travelled to Kirtland, Ohio, to establish a farm and open a publication firm with Pratt. It was in 1837 that Goodson and Pratt performed all of the editing tasks for the second edition of the Book of Mormon.

On November 14, 1836, Goodson married Margaret Dawson. In 1837, Goodson joined the first Mormon mission to England, leaving New York on July 1. Goodson's time in Preston, Lancashire, resulted in many baptisms into the Latter Day Saint church. During his stay in Bedford, he and Willard Richards encountered great turbulence from people denouncing the words of the missionaries, pelting them with turnips among other things. Just three days after this episode, Goodson would leave Bedford and head for London in order to visit his family. Upon returning from London, he and John Snider would begin their journey back to the United States on October 5, 1837. Heber C. Kimball would go on to charge that Goodson was teaching things that were not in wisdom, and that these things "proved a barrier to the spread of the gospel in the region." John Taylor would also disclose that Goodson was preaching doctrines that the apostles of the church did not want disclosed to the masses. Goodson had come to believe that the Mormons were not being entirely straightforward with the people they were trying to convert.

Goodson would return to Canada in early November 1837 and begin making plans to permanently settle in the United States. He and Margaret would start their journey in the spring or summer of 1838. Goodson applied for permanent U.S. citizenship upon crossing into Erie County, Ohio. Goodson and Margaret would also have their first child, Mary Hope, while living in Ohio. When Joseph Smith was chased out of Kirtland, Ohio, to Far West, Missouri, the rest of the Mormon families in the Kirtland area followed suit. Goodson and his family were not part of this group, likely wanting to wait for Margaret to have their child, but by early 1839 they would move to Carrollton, Missouri. After persecution by mobs, they would eventually move to Far West, to be safer near the main body of the church. On April 26, 1839, at a Latter Day Saint meeting in Far West, Goodson and his family were officially excommunicated from the church along with Isaac Russell and others. Russell, Margaret Goodson's uncle, had been accused of starting an offshoot branch of the church. This happened as the Saints were fleeing Missouri in the winter of 1838–39. Russell's name would be cleared by the church years later because it was deemed he had not performed any of the acts for which he had been charged. Apostles present at the meeting were Brigham Young, Heber C. Kimball, Orson Pratt, John E. Page, and John Taylor. Goodson signed his name to a letter that he personally witnessed the excommunication hearing.

== Music career ==
After being excommunicated from the Latter Day Saint church, Goodson decided to return to his work as a musician. In late 1839, Goodson travelled down the Missouri River to St. Louis for a New Year's Eve performance at the grand opening of a new hall at 2nd and Market Street. For the performance, Goodson played "Mozart's La Clemenza di Tito". Upon returning to Far West in early 1840, Goodson and the family moved to Rockport, Missouri. Goodson and Margaret had four children; Mary Hope (b. 1838), John Edward (b. 1840 d. 1852), Frank Faith (b. 1842 d. 1852), and Lillie(b. unknown). Goodson continued to pursue musical education and performing as a career in St. Louis while maintaining a residence in Rockport, becoming Professor of Music at Kemper University in St. Louis. During these years, he and his family travelled the Missouri River a great deal by steamboat. In 1846, Margaret drowned in the Missouri River when the steamboat Radnor sank near Boonville, Missouri, becoming one of the great tragedies in Goodson's life. The boat would never be recovered.

On July 10, 1846, Goodson married his widow's sister, Elizabeth Dawson, and subsequently moved to Cincinnati, Ohio, where he would continue teaching music. It was in 1850 that he first met Ralph Waldo Emerson while he was on a tour in Cincinnati. Emerson wrote of their encounter in his journal. Emerson persuaded Goodson to follow him to Massachusetts, and introduced him to the Boston Athenæum in late July, 1850. Emerson also mentioned Goodson along with Alcott and Hawthorne in notes about forming a "Boston Club". On December 21, 1850, his first performance in Boston, Goodson played two organ fugues by J. S. Bach, one in F sharp minor and one in E major. On August 15, 1851, Goodson was appointed conductor of the Handel and Haydn Society in Boston, a capacity he served in for a short time. At the concert of January 24, 1852, Goodson played a prelude and five part fugue in C sharp minor by Bach, probably upon the piano, though the instrument is not stated. He was described by John S. Dwight in his book History of the Handel and Haydn Society as "an accomplished musician and organist. A thinking man, too, with mind much occupied in philosophical and social questions. We have an impression that he stayed not longer than a year or two in Boston and then sought his fortune in the West." John would remain the conductor of the Handel and Haydn Society for one year and then leave with his family to settle in Missouri for good, leaving around the time that both of his sons died of smallpox.

In early 1852, Goodson established a farm with his family in Franklin County, Missouri. Goodson and his wife Elizabeth had 7 children together; Thomas Carlyle (b. 1847), Elizabeth Emerson (b. 1849), John Edward (b. 1851), Frank Faith (b. 1854), Henry Clinton (b. 1857), Cora (b. 1859), and Anna Elizabeth (b. 1863). In 1858, Goodson travelled to St. Louis in order to establish a home for his family and to pursue further employment in the music profession. The New York Weekly Review had this to say about a performance Goodson gave in St. Louis on May 8, 1860: "The music-loving people of our city were favored with quite a treat last evening in the shape of an organ exhibition given by Mr. J. E. Goodson, at St. George’s Church." The periodical goes on to say, "Mr. G. certainly did himself great credit as a performer and musician. The program for the occasion contained nothing but the best pieces; among others, two by Handel, two by Haydn, three by Mozart, two by J. S. Bach, and one by Mendelssohn, the influence of which cannot fail of having a good tendency. The introductory was from Handel’s Concerto in D Major, and was played with true artistic skill, as likewise were the others, of which I cannot go into detail. Of the playing of one piece I was particularly pleased; Favorite Air, with Variations, including Adagio on the Cremona, from Mozart."

== Final years and death ==
After moving along with his family to St. Louis, Goodson continued teaching, writing, and performing. In 1881, John sent a letter to John Taylor, an old friend from his Mormon days who had become the president of the LDS Church after Brigham Young's death. Goodson writes "it is now about forty-five years since you and I, Isaac Russell, Joseph Fielding, and several others were baptized into the church by the late P. P. Pratt at Charleston’s settlement near Toronto. Since that day, the divine providence has connected us by diverse roads, to bring to pass his strange acts. You have become president of the church, and I have become a classical organist and pianoforte teacher." Having heard of the prosperity of the Saints, Goodson asked "if there would be a reasonable chance of obtaining moderate employment in my profession" in Utah Territory. Taylor welcomed the repentance of an old friend, but could offer him no such opportunity. Goodson died on March 2, 1892, in St. Louis, Missouri. He was buried in Forest Lawn Cemetery in Omaha, Nebraska.

== Selected works ==
How Sweet Is Woman's Love / words by H.G. Knight / composed by J.E. Goodson

Uncle Jack's Fugue / composed by J.E. Goodson. -- [S.l.] : [s.n.], [n.d.] 1 score (3 p.)

== Legacy ==
Second conductor of the Handel and Haydn Society in Boston.

Goodson's great-grandson was Thomas B. Curtis, a congressman from Missouri during the 1950s and 1960s.
