= Sam Mercer (preservationist) =

- Born: May 5, 1920; London, England
- Died: February 5, 2013 (aged 92); Honfleur, France
- Occupation: Preservationist
- Relatives: Samuel David Mercer (grandfather); Nelson Samuel Mercer (father); Mark Mercer (son)

Samuel David Mercer (May 5, 1920 – February 5, 2013) was an American preservationist. He was known for developing and preserving Omaha's Old Market neighborhood, of which he was known as the "godfather".

== Early life ==
Mercer was born in London, England, to Dr. Nelson Samuel Mercer and Anna Mary Mulholland. He was their third known child, after sisters Margaret and Nancy. He was educated at the University of Oxford and Yale University.

Mercer's maternal grandfather was Dr. Samuel Mercer, whose former home is now named in his honor, in Omaha, Nebraska.

== Career ==
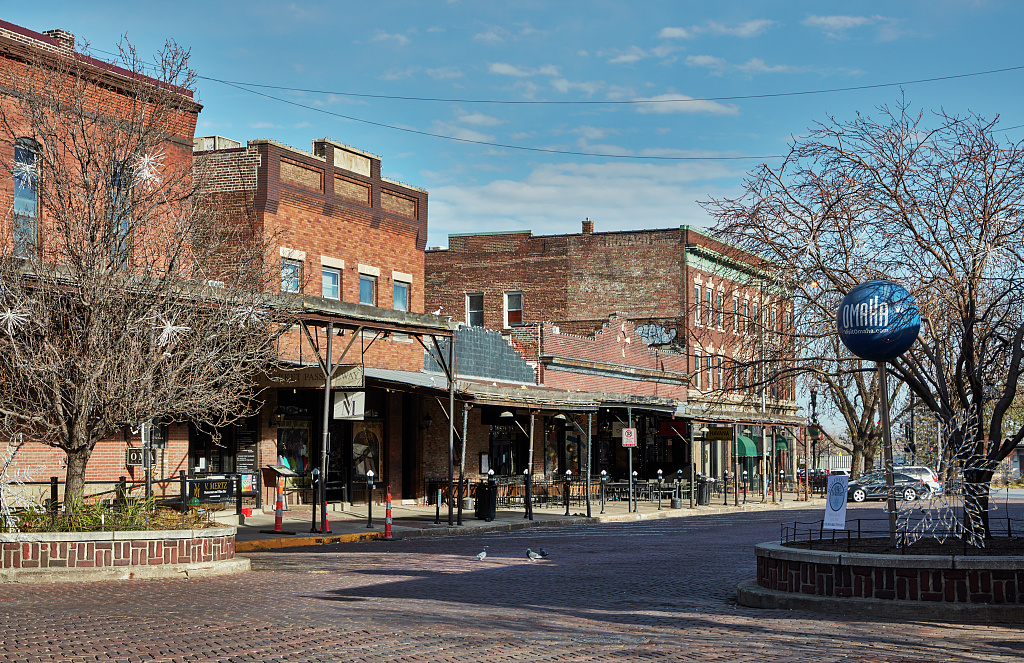
Part of the Old Market in Omaha, Nebraska

After the death of his father in 1963, Mercer took control of the Mercer Management Company. Later in the 1960s, he began redeveloping the area around 11th Street and Howard Street in Omaha, Nebraska, with the assistance of designer Cedric Hartman. "He certainly had a great appreciation for old buildings and also a need to fill the empty places with new tenants," said Judy Wigton, Hartman's business partner.

In 1994, Mercer wrote The Old Market of Omaha in collaboration with his son, Mark.

== Personal life ==
Mercer married twice. His second wife was artist Eva Aeppli.

== Death ==
Mercer died in France in 2013, aged 92. He had been living in Paris, having held dual citizenship. He was also fluent in French.
