= La Buvette =

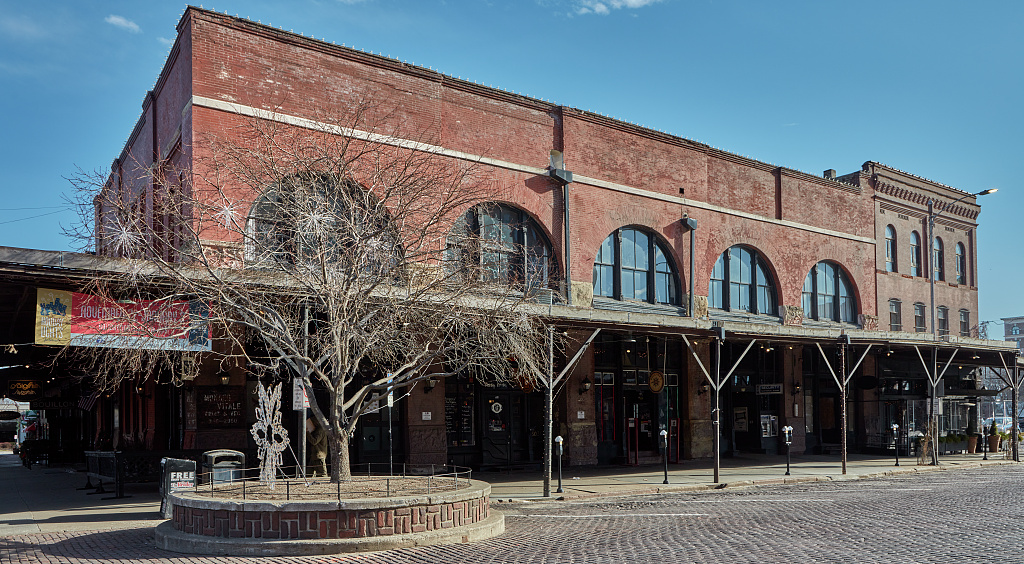
- The restaurant is on the right in this 2021 view

- Location within Nebraska Location within the United States

Restaurant information
- Established: 1991 (35 years ago)
- Owners: Mark Mercer; Vera Mercer
- Chef: Julie Friederich
- Food type: French cuisine
- Location: 511 S 11th Street; Old Market, Omaha, Douglas County, Nebraska, 68102, United States
- Coordinates: 41.25502°N 95.93028°W
- Reservations: No
- Website: www.labuvetteomaha.com
- Historic Building
- U.S. National Register of Historic Places
- Architect: Blake & Zander
- MPS: Architecture/Engineering
- NRHP reference No.: 79001441
- Added to NRHP: March 23, 1979

La Buvette is a restaurant, wine bar and grocery store in the Old Market neighborhood of Omaha, Nebraska, United States. Established in 1991 by Mark and Vera Mercer, initially solely as a delicatessen, its food menu is inspired by French cuisine, and described by The New York Times as being "charmingly un-American". Its large wine selection has been recognized nationally.

The restaurant's chef is Julie Friederich, whose husband, Keith, is the baker. Breads are made using Parisian methods.

Co-founder and Omaha native Mark Mercer died on September 16, 2019, after a long battle with cancer.

The business is located in the Rocco Brothers (also known as the Craftsmen Guild) building, which dates to 1895 and is on the National Register of Historic Places as part of the Old Market Historic District.

== Gallery ==
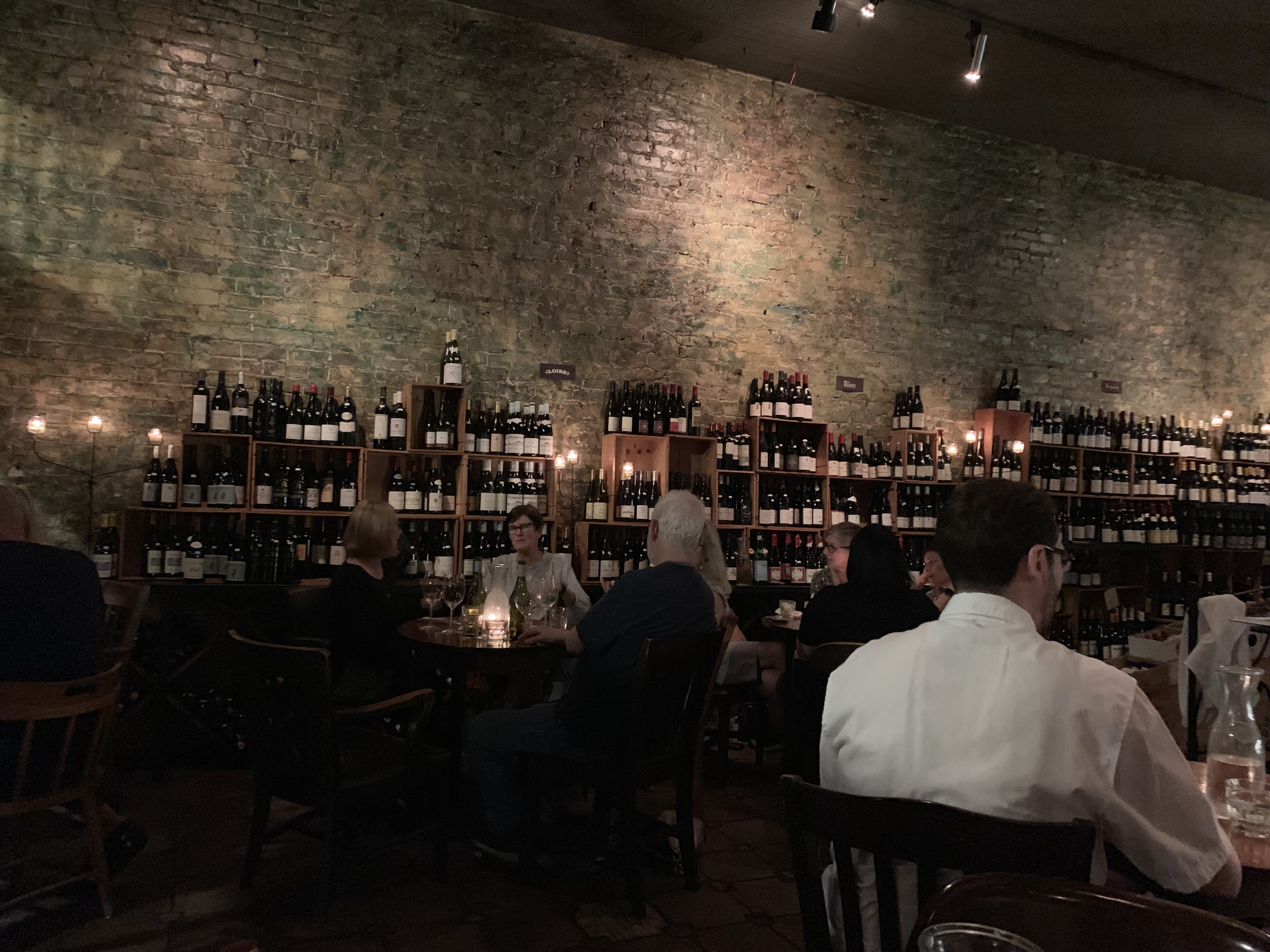
Dining area and a part of the wine selection

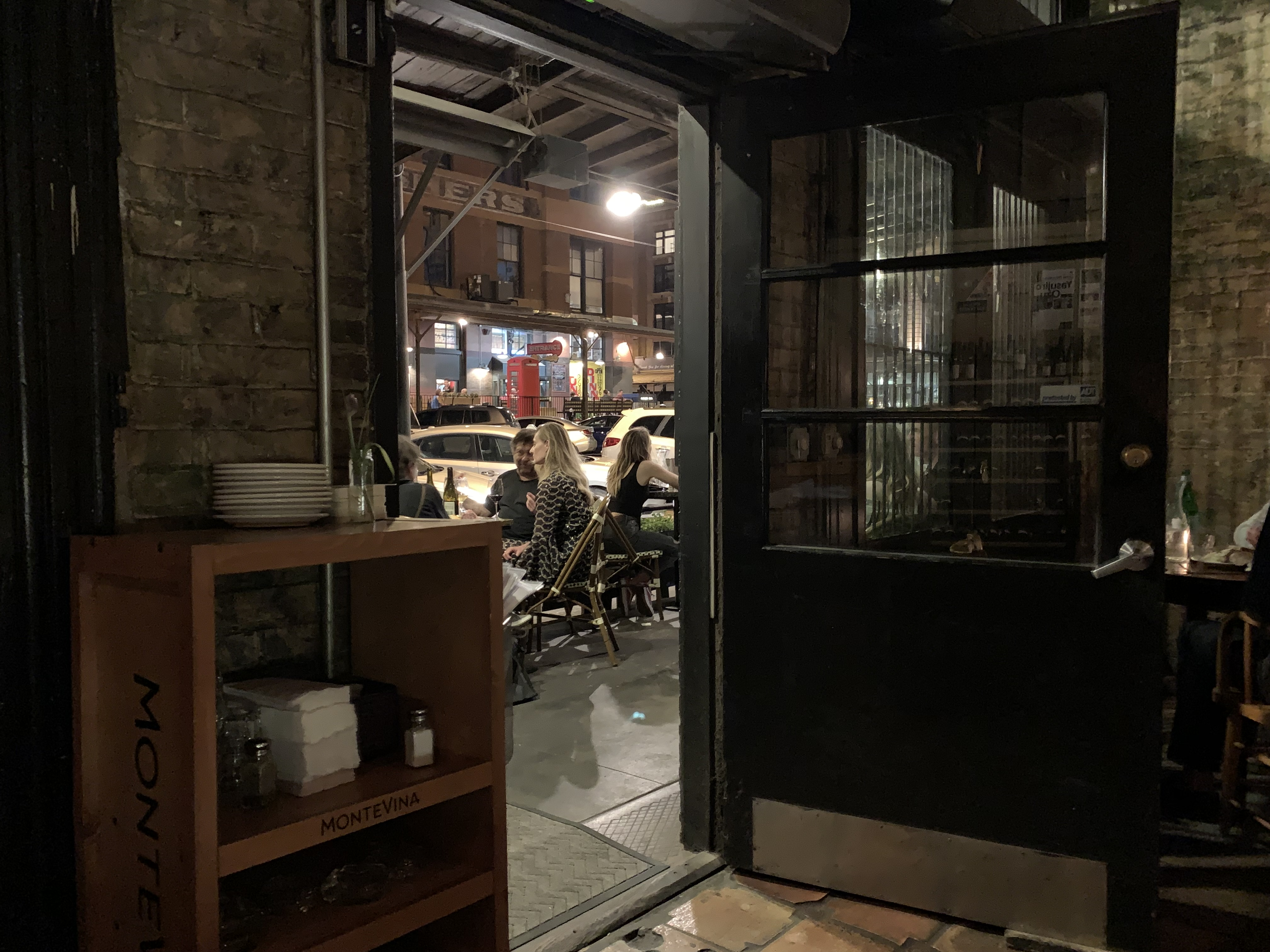
Looking out onto the roofed patio on S 11th Street
