= Major Mercer (Worcestershire horse) =

Microsoft routing policies

Major Mercer, the commander of the Worcestershire horse, played a significant part in the Battle of Worcester in 1651, but although mentioned in primary sources his full name is not given in them. David Laing speculated that he was John Mercer, the younger brother of William Mercer who was also a parliamentary officer and author of "Angliae Speculum, or England's looking-glass" (London 1646).
