= Old Market (Omaha, Nebraska) =

Historic district and neighborhood in Omaha, Nebraska

- Old Market Historic District
- U.S. National Register of Historic Places
- U.S. Historic district
- Omaha Landmark
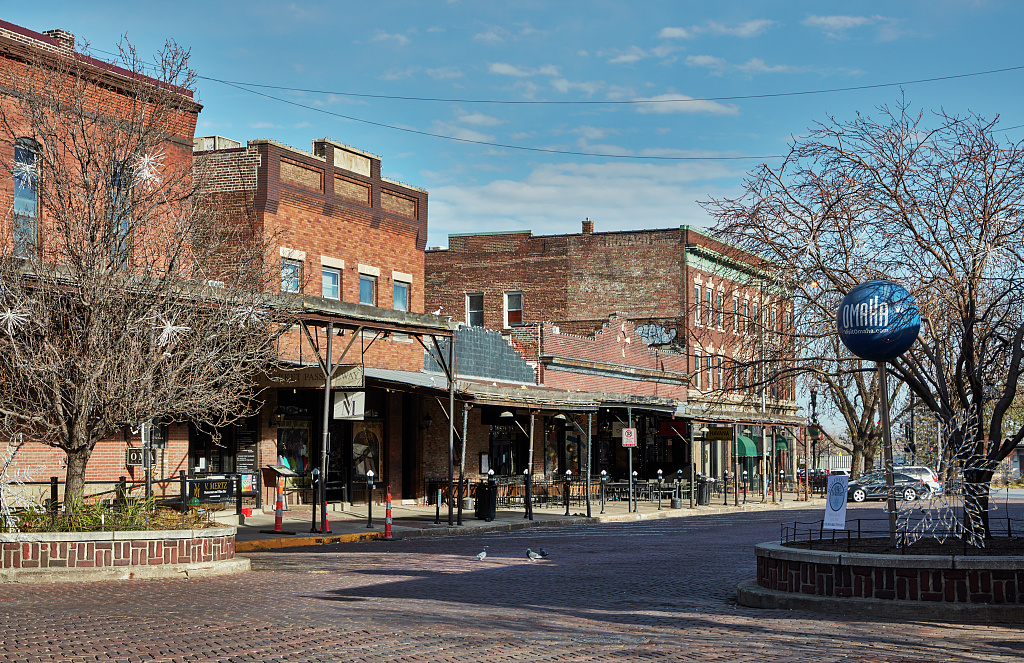
- Howard Street in the heart of the Old Market
- Location: Omaha, Nebraska
- Coordinates: 41°15′20″N 95°55′50″W
- Architect: Multiple
- NRHP reference No.: 79001441

Significant dates
- Added to NRHP: March 23, 1979
- Designated OMAL: January 22, 1985

The Old Market is a neighborhood located in Downtown Omaha, Nebraska, United States, and is bordered by South 10th Street to the east, 13th Street to the west, Farnam Street to the north and Jackson Street to the South. The neighborhood has many restaurants, art galleries and upscale shopping. The area retains its brick paved streets from the turn of the 20th century, horse-drawn carriages, and covered sidewalks in some areas. It is not uncommon to see a variety of street performers, artists, and other vendors.

== Historic designation ==
The area is on the National Register of Historic Places as a historic district, and borders the former site of the Jobbers Canyon Historic District, as well as the extant Omaha Rail and Commerce Historic District and the Warehouses in Omaha MPS. There is a walking tour of historic buildings available from the Omaha Chamber of Commerce. There are also several specifically noted historic buildings within the district.

== History ==
The Old Market was developed in the late 1800s as a center for wholesale and other jobs. Many manufacturing and printing companies began to locate themselves in the Old Market. By the 1960s, the Old Market began experiencing vacancy issues. Other venues West of the district pulled people away from it.

Buildings were eventually converted into apartments and restaurants and the Old Market became an entertainment district by 1970. The district was added to the National Register of Historic Places on March 23, 1979, and was designated as an Omaha Landmark on January 22, 1985. In 1988, a block of the Old Market was demolished to build 1200 Landmark Center. One of the buildings, the Dewey and Stone Building, had its facade preserved for future usage.

KETV reported that a man fired a handgun near 12th and Howard Street, close to the Old Market. According to several OPD officers, the scene sounded like a "gun battle." A man was found outside the Old Market with a gunshot wound from the "battle." He was later transported to UNMC for immediate medical attention.

=== 2016 Old Market explosion ===
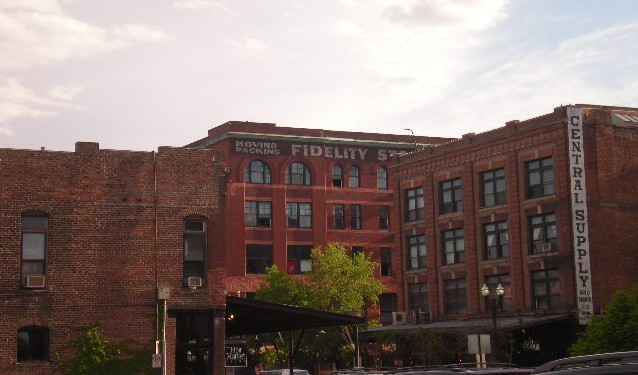
Many of the original warehouses in the Old Market have been converted into lofts. The building on the right was damaged by the January 2016 fire.

On January 9, 2016, at 2:51 pm local time, a large explosion occurred at M's Pub on the northwest corner of 11th and Howard streets, causing a large fire to break out. The fire and subsequent efforts to extinguish it caused a total loss of the 100-year-old building as firefighters worked through the night and following morning. Temperatures at the time were in the sub-zero range, causing large-scale freezing of the water from the fire fighting efforts. The explosion is believed to have been caused by a gas line that was accidentally ruptured by contractors on behalf of Verizon installing fiber-optic cables. Although several people were injured during the explosion, there were no fatalities. Eyewitnesses reported injuries sustained by multiple people within the immediate vicinity of the explosion, although these were not broadcast by local media outlets.

== Historic buildings ==
Buildings within the Old Market have served a variety of purposes, and were built during various eras. Originally built to sell groceries wholesale and retail to the city of Omaha and beyond, the Old Market district was preceded by the Market House in Omaha's Jefferson Square.

The Old Market district was formed when the Market House still stood. The buildings and businesses included:

- P. E. Iler Block, a contributing property to the district. Built in 1901, the six-story building was originally built as a warehouse. A 1990 rehabilitation converted the building into retail and office space.
- The Windsor Hotel is a three-story brick building built in 1885. The building was converted into rental residential and commercial space in 1985. The Broatch Building was built in 1880, and expanded in 1887.
- The McClure-Smith Building is a two-story brick building that was built around 1878. Originally a steam bakery, a 1985 rehabilitation converted the building to office and retail space.
- The A. I. Root Building is a three-story brick building constructed in 1904 as offices. The building was doubled in size by the addition of an equal-size portion, in 1909. In 1993, it was converted to retail and residential spaces.
- The Morse-Coe Shoe Company, now known as the Mayfield Apartments, was built as a five-story warehouse and light industrial building, in 1894. A 2002 rehabilitation converted the structure to a mixed-use of apartments, retail space and parking. The George H. Lee Building was built, in 1903, as warehouse and office space.

=== Construction ===
Most of the buildings in the Old Market are brick, and the streets throughout are covered with bricked surfaces, cobblestone and asphalt. There were also cast-iron fronts, metal cornices, stone trim, and metal sidewalk coverings shelters attached to many of the buildings around the turn of the 20th century.

=== Building details ===
| Name | Built | Location | NRHP? | Notes |
|---|---|---|---|---|
| Windsor Hotel | 1885, 1889 | 520-524 South 10th Street | Yes | |
| Omaha Fire Station Number One | 1902–04 | 514 South 11th Street | Yes | |
| P.E. Iler Block | 1900–01 | 1113-1117 Howard Street | Yes | |
| Millard Block Number Two | 1887 | 1109-1111 Harney Street | Yes | Designed by the architecture firm Isaac Hodgson and Son. |
| Mercer Hotel - Gahm Block | 1890–92, 1900 | 1202-1208 Howard Street; 414-418 South 12th Street | Yes | Originally designed by architect Charles F. Beindorff, and completely renovated in 1900 by architect Charles Cleves. |
| Millard Block | 1881–82 | 1101-1107 Harney Street | Yes | |
| W.J. Broatch Building | 1880, 1887 | 1209-1211 Harney Street | Yes | |
| Steele, Johnson and Company / Baum Iron Company Building | 1881 | 1219-21-23 Harney Street | Yes | Today, Baum continues to operate at this location as the Baum Hydraulic Company. |
| Poppleton Block | 1886 | 413-423 South 11th Street | Yes | |
| Ernest Myer Building | 1912 | 1015 Howard Street | Yes | |
| Hotel Howard | 1909 | 1002-06 Howard Street | Yes | |
| Lehman Building | 1905 | 1008-1012 Howard Street | Yes | |
| | 1934 | 1014 Howard Street | Yes | |
| Mercer Block Number Two | 1887 | 501-509 South 11th Street | Yes | Designed by architect Henry Voss. |
| Rocco Brothers / Craftsmen Guild | 1895 | 511 South 11th Street | Yes | |
| Kosters / Gilinsky / French Cafe Building | 1891 | 1013-1017 Howard Street | Yes | |
| Metz Block | 1890s | 508-10-12 South 10th Street | Yes | |
| Public Market | 1905 | NE corner of 11th and Jackson | | |
| Ames Block | 1889 | 1101-1111 Howard Street | Yes | Designed by the architectural firm of VanBrunt and Howe from Kansas City, Missouri |
| Mercer Block Number Three | 1905 | 1102-1112 Howard Street and 414-424 South 11th Street | Yes | Designed by architect Charles Cleves. |
| Woolworth Building | 1887 | 1114-24 Howard Street | Yes | Designed by the firm of Mendelssohn and Lawrie. |
| A.I. Root Building | 1904, 1909 | 1210-12-14-16 Howard Street | Yes | Designed by architect F. A. Henninger. |
| Morse-Coe Shoe Company Building | 1894 | 1119-23 Howard Street | Yes | |
| George H. Lee Building | 1903 | 1115-17 Harney Street | Yes | Designed by architect John Latenser. |
| | 1901 (est) | 1205-07 Harney Street | Yes | |
| George Warren Smith Building | 1880 | 1213-15 Harney Street | Yes | |
| | 1880 | 1113 Harney Street | Yes | |
| National Building | 1915 | 406 South 12th Street | Yes | |
| Baker-Corey-McKenzie Building | 1919 | 1120-24 Harney Street | Yes | Designed by the architectural firm of John Latenser & Sons. |
| P.E. Iler Block | 1881 | 1108-10-12 Harney Street | Yes | |
| Millard-Kirkendall and Jones Building | 1887 | 1102-06 Harney Street | Yes | |
| Omaha Crockery Building | 1918 | 1116-20 Harney Street | Yes | Designed by architect J. Christ Jensen |
| Smith Building | 1877 | 1113 Farnam Street | Yes | |
| Dewey and Stone Building | 1876 | 1115-17 Farnam Street | Yes | |
| Clark and French Building | 1879 | 1119 Farnam Street | Yes | |

== Public safety ==
In late August 2026 police tape was in place around part of the Old Market (one of Omaha's major tourist draws). Local reporting noted several changes in how police were operating in the area, including a larger presence, more cameras, and help from the Nebraska State Patrol.

Mayor John Ewing said the city was working on adjusting its staffing levels to deal with the problem areas, and that police were actively monitoring the "hot spots" to ensure that those areas had the right level of coverage.

Ewing acknowledged that a large police presence can create tension and that police responses must be carefully measured. "The one thing we have to always be careful of is if a group of people is law-abiding, you can't just go in and start breaking people up, because if you do that, people will say you're doing heavy-handed policing and overreacting," Ewing said in response to the idea of introducing more officers to the Old Market. He also stated that you can't always anticipate when someone at a peaceful gathering is going to start behaving in an unlawful manner and potentially put others at risk.

Visitors to the area have had mixed reactions to the increased police presence. One Omaha resident commented that more police can in fact lead to more tension, even if the intent is to keep the community safe. He did suggest that more community engagement would be beneficial, particularly with those who are regularly in downtown. Ewing said he believes Omaha as a whole, including the Old Market, is a safe place.

== Arts and cultural venues ==
The Old Market contains several contemporary art venues and galleries. KANEKO, a creative space that hosts exhibitions, is located in the market.These exhibitions last several months and have many different themes from activism to self guided audio tours. The Bemis Center for Contemporary Arts, which also presents exhibitions as well as creative programming, is another arts institution in the neighborhood.

The Artists' Cooperative Gallery and the Old Market Artists Gallery also reside in the Omaha Old Market. "Contemporary art is part of the neighborhood's identity," says Visit Omaha.

Beyond galleries, the Old Market has other spaces for creative work and shopping. Jackson Street Booksellers is an independent bookstore in the neighborhood, and Homer's Music sells records. The Old Market Passageway, a plant-filled walkway, and the Garden of the Zodiac are also among the area's sights. There are also often streetside performers offering entertainment and music on the sidewalks of the Old Market.

== Image gallery ==
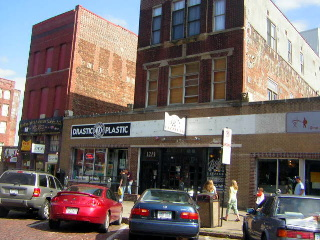
Businesses located along Howard street in the Old Market.

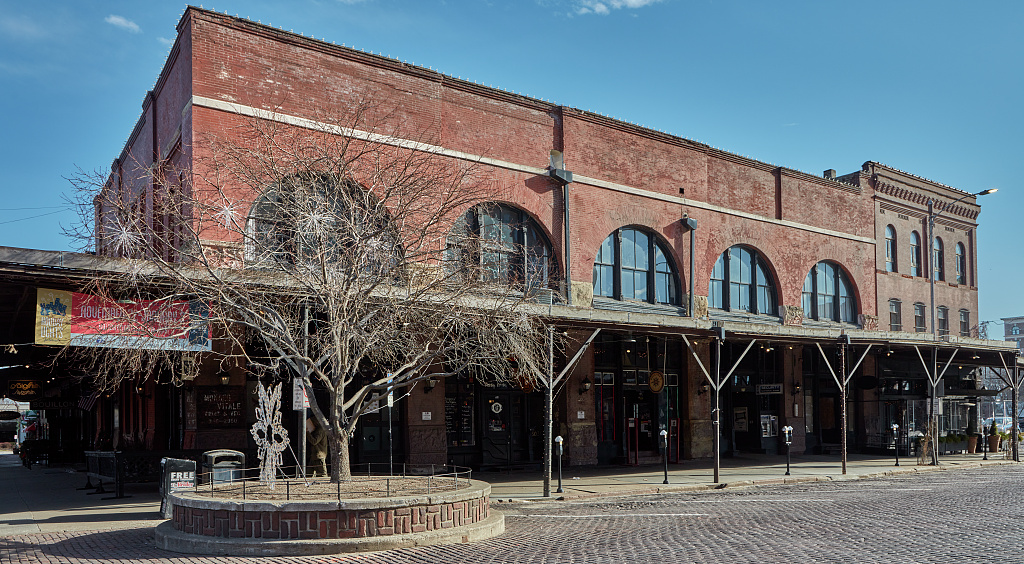
Mercer Block Number Two & Rocco Brothers Building, on 11th Street

== See also ==
- Sam Mercer, preservationist
- Mark Mercer, preservationist
- Cedric Hartman, designer
