= David Knox =

David Knox may refer to:

- David Knox (photographer) (1821–1895), Scottish-American photographer of the American Civil War
- David Broughton Knox (1916–1994), Australian Anglican priest, Principal of Moore Theological College, 1959–1985
- Sir David Knox (politician) (1933–2025), British Conservative Member of Parliament
- David Knox (rugby league) (fl. 1964–1971), Australian rugby league player
- David Knox (rugby union) (born 1963), Australian rugby union player and coach
- David Knox (businessman) (fl. 2003–present), Scottish/Australian businessman and director of oil and gas company Santos
- David Knox (fl. 2007–present), creator of Australian-based website TV Tonight

== See also ==
- David Knox Barton (1927–2023), American radar systems engineer
