= Alex Mercer =

Scottish footballer

Personal information
- Full name: Alexander Robertson Mercer
- Date of birth: 29 January 1892
- Place of birth: Stirling, Scotland
- Date of death: 16 July 1916 (aged 24)
- Place of death: Albert, Somme, France
- Position: Right half

Senior career*
Years	Team	Apps	(Gls)
1915	Queen's Park	7	(0)
- * Club domestic league appearances and goals

Alexander Robertson Mercer was a Scottish amateur footballer who played as a right half in the Scottish League for Queen's Park.

== Personal life ==
Mercer served as a lance corporal in the Lovat Scouts during the First World War. He was killed during the battle of the Somme on the 15th of July 1916.

== Career statistics ==
Appearances and goals by club, season and competition
Club	Season	League			Other		Total	
Club	Season	Division	Apps	Goals	Apps	Goals	Apps	Goals
Queen's Park	1915–16	Scottish First Division	7	0	1 (Note: Appearance in Glasgow Cup)	0	8	0
Career total			7	0	1	0	8	0
