= SS Minnehaha =

Coordinates: 51°17.82′N 9°17.88′W

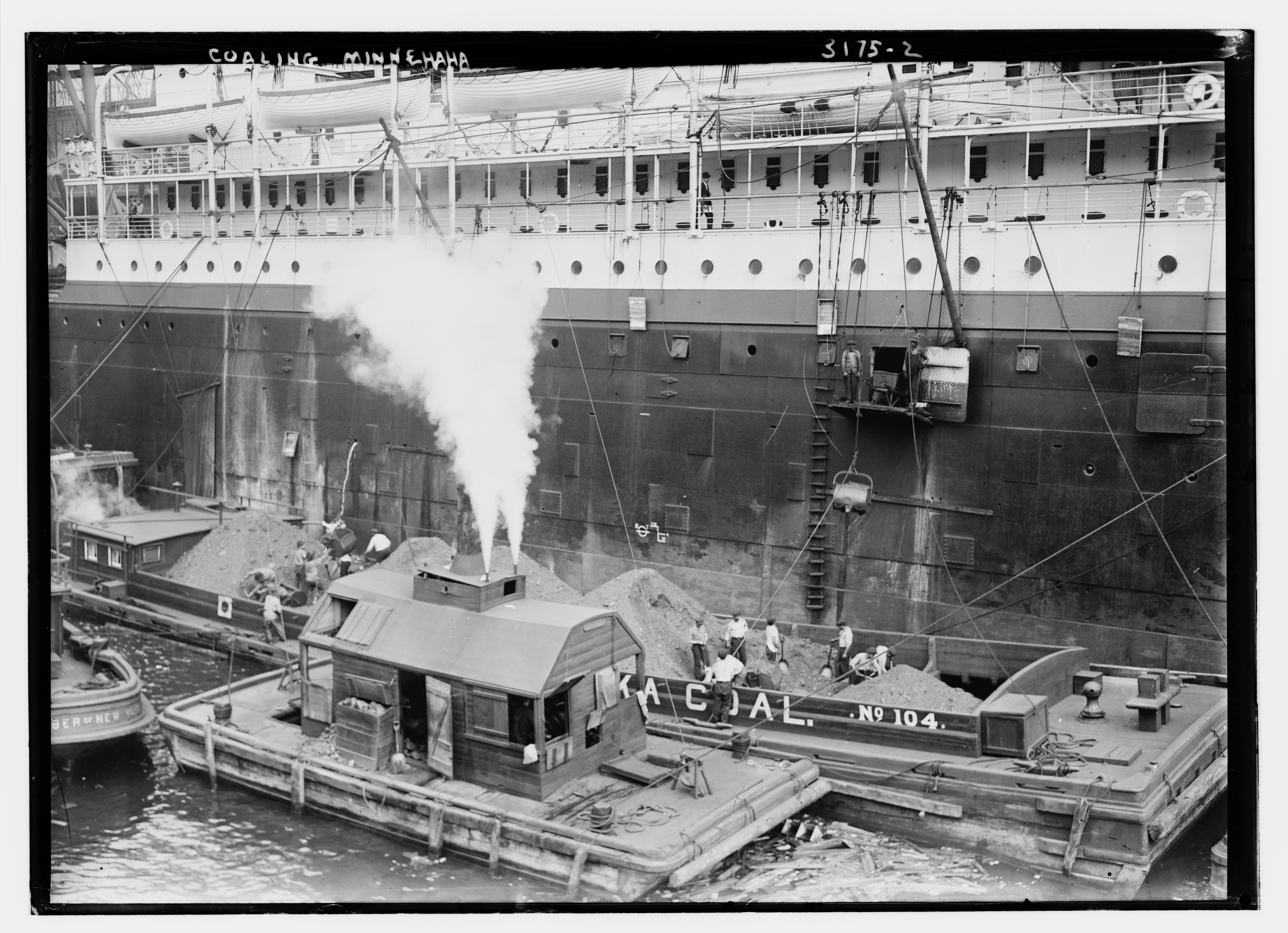

History

United States
- Name: SS Minnehaha
- Namesake: Minnehaha
- Owner: Atlantic Transport Line
- Port of registry: Belfast
- Builder: Harland & Wolff, Belfast
- Cost: US$1,419,120 (£292,000)
- Yard number: 329
- Launched: 31 March 1900
- Maiden voyage: 7 July 1900
- Identification: Official number: 110520; Call sign: MMA; Code letters: RSHM
- Fate: Torpedoed and sunk, 7 September 1917

General characteristics
- Class & type: Minne-class ocean liner
- Tonnage: 13,403 GRT; 8,647 NRT
- Length: 600 ft 8 in (183.08 m)
- Beam: 65 ft 6 in (19.96 m)
- Depth of hold: 39 ft 6 in (12.04 m)
- Decks: 4 decks and shelter deck
- Propulsion: Quadruple expansion steam engines; 1,227 nhp; 2 screws
- Speed: 16 knots (30 km/h; 18 mph)

SS Minnehaha was a 13,443-ton ocean liner built by Harland & Wolff and launched on 31 March 1900. Operated by the American-owned Atlantic Transport Line, she was the sister ship of Minneapolis, Minnetonka, and Minnewaska.

In her first year of operations, the Minnehaha collided with and sank a tug in New York Harbor on 18 September 1900. The tug suffered two fatalities.

On 18 April 1910, the liner grounded on rocks on Bryher in the Isles of Scilly while en route from New York City to Tilbury, near London; she remained stranded until 13 May when two tugs managed to pull her off the rocks. The cattle on board were saved by swimming them onto the island of Samson, Isles of Scilly where there was temporary pasture; there were no deaths.

The ship was being used to ferry munitions to Britain from the U.S. during the early years of World War I. During a multi-state crime spree, German sympathizer Eric Muenter planted a timed bomb on the Minnehaha after bombing the U.S. Capitol and before shooting financier J. P. Morgan, Jr. Days after his jail-cell suicide, Muenter's bomb exploded, setting off a fire, though the explosion did not reach the munitions and caused minimal damage to the ship itself.

On 7 September 1917, Minnehaha sank within four minutes with 43 fatalities, after being torpedoed by German U-boat U-48, off the Fastnet. Her sister ships Minneapolis and Minnetonka were sunk while in use as troop transports during World War I.

== See also ==
- Minnehaha – wrecked off Peninnis Head in the Isles of Scilly on 18 January 1874
- List of shipwrecks of the Isles of Scilly
- Atlantic Transport Line
