= John Mercer (photojournalist) =

New Zealand photojournalist

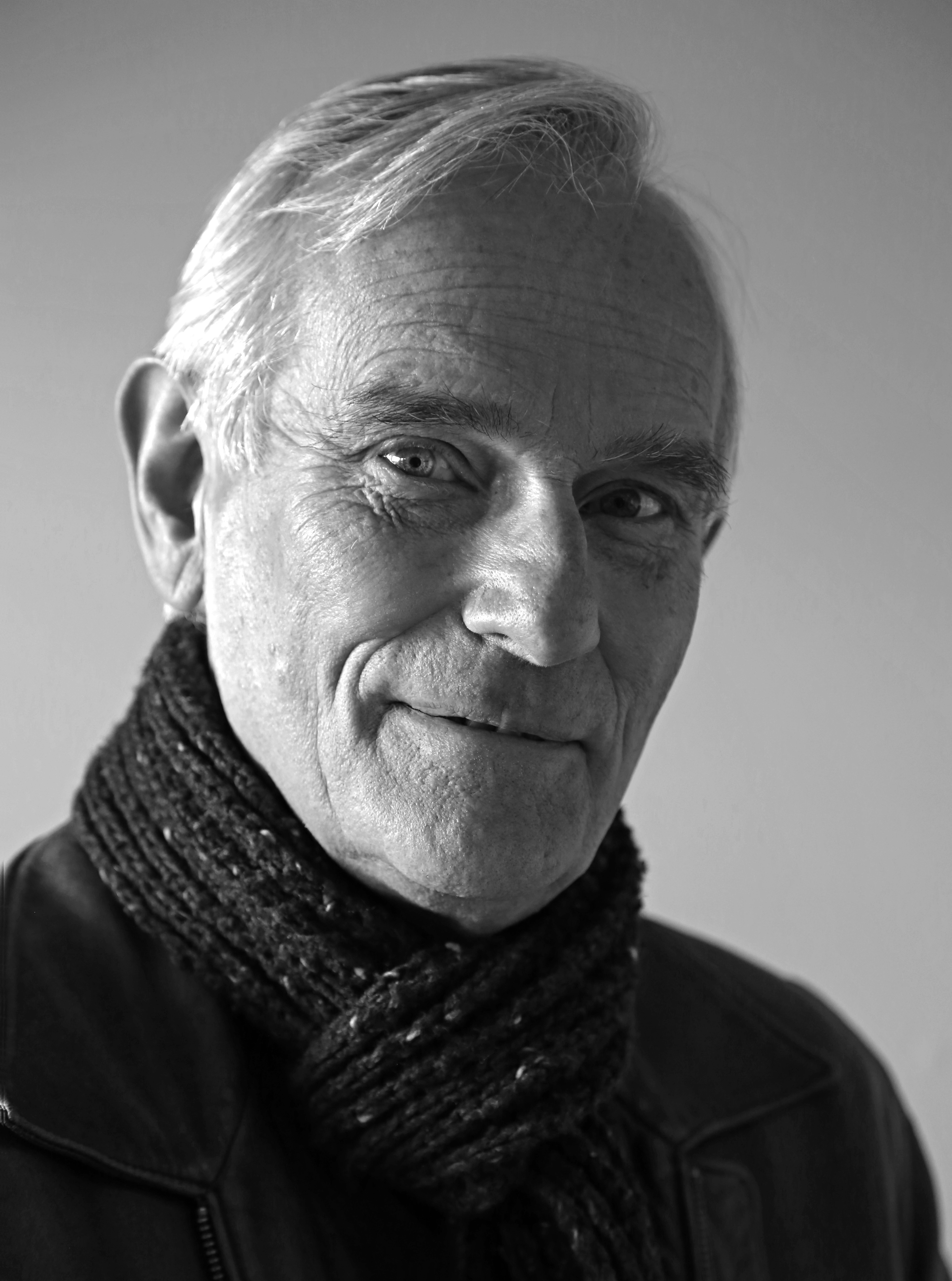
- Mercer in 2021
- Born: December 12, 1949 (age 76); New Plymouth, New Zealand
- Occupations: Photojournalist; Photographer
- Years active: 1980 – present
- Style: Documentary photography

John Anthony Mercer (born 12 December 1949) is a New Zealand photojournalist.

== Personal life ==
Mercer was born in New Plymouth, New Zealand on 12 December 1949. He lives in Adelaide, Australia.

== Career ==
Mercer was active as a photojournalist in New Zealand from 1980 to 1986, during which time he became involved in and photographed a number of activist events. He photographs predominantly in a documentary style.

=== Springbok Tour protests ===
Mercer participated in and photographed the protests against the 1981 Springbok Tour in rugby union. He took photographs at three of the rugby venues around the North Island — Hamilton, Rotorua and Auckland.

On 25 July 1981, anti-Springbok Tour protests stopped the game in Hamilton. Mercer photographed the ensuing action of protestors, police, rugby fans, and bystanders. Before moving to Adelaide at the end of 1985, he left a selection of photographic prints with the Waikato Art Museum. In 2006, these images were exhibited in "Revisiting the 1981 Springbok Rugby Tour 25 years on—through the eyes of three photographers", and were exhibited again in 2021, in the exhibition "1981", to mark the fortieth anniversary of the Tour.

A collection of Mercer's work from this time is also held by Auckland War Memorial Museum, including photographs of the third test at Eden Park on September 12, 1981. These were some of the most violent confrontations between police and protestors throughout the tour.

Mercer was director and a founding member of The Photographer's Workshop, a collective of Waikato photographers who taught photography, held exhibitions, and provided studios and darkrooms for hire. With his partner, Deborah Taylor, he also founded Cameraworks, a business offering custom commercial photography and a black-and-white film processing and printing service.
