= Mercer (given name) =

Mercer is the given name of:

== People ==
- Mercer Cook (1903–1987), African-American diplomat and professor
- Mercer Ellington (1919–1996), American jazz trumpeter, composer and arranger
- Mercer Mayer (born 1943), American children's book writer and illustrator
- Mercer Reynolds (born 1945), American businessman
- Mercer Simpson (1926–2007), English writer active in Welsh literary circles

== Fictional characters ==
- Mercer (G.I. Joe), in the G.I. Joe universe
