= Mercer Pottery Company =

The Mercer Pottery Company is a defunct American pottery company. The backstamp on many of its pottery pieces indicates it was founded in 1865 in Trenton, New Jersey. It was then purchased in 1875 by James Moses. The company ran successfully until the 1930s. It claimed to have made the first semi-porcelain ware in the United States. They operated four kilns and employed 120 people with an annual revenue of $150,000 per year. Although primarily focused on plain white dinnerware, by 1873 the company had established an on-site decorating room in order to facilitate a growing demand for decorated ceramics.

In 1900, the plant faced a strike by its jiggermen who claimed the company paid unfair wages. The issue was brought to a committee formed by parties on both sides to settle the matter, but workers decided that the committee was not deciding fast enough. Despite the strike, the plant continued to operate and the issue remained at the committee. A decade later, the plant threatened to shut down due to, what it considered, unreasonable demands by city inspectors.
