= Mercer Township =

Mercer Township may refer to:

- Mercer Township, Mercer County, Illinois
- Mercer Township, Adams County, Iowa
- Mercer Township, McLean County, North Dakota, in McLean County, North Dakota
- Mercer Township, Pennsylvania
