= Minnehaha (cargo ship) =

Coordinates: 49.9049°N 6.3036°W

History

United Kingdom
- Name: Minnehaha
- Owner: Richard Hughes and Co, Liverpool
- Launched: 1857
- Fate: Shipwrecked, 18 January 1874

General characteristics
- Type: Barque
- Tonnage: 845 GRT
- Length: 158 ft (48 m)
- Beam: 33 ft (10 m)
- Draught: 22 ft (6.7 m)

Minnehaha was a barque built in 1857 and wrecked on 18 January 1874 in the Isles of Scilly.

== Wreck ==
Approximate position of the wreck

On 18 January 1874, while travelling from Callao, Peru to Dublin, the 845-ton barque Minnehaha carrying guano was wrecked off Peninnis Head, St Mary's, Isles of Scilly. Her pilot mistook the St Agnes light for the Wolf Rock and thought they were passing between the Isles of Scilly and the Wolf. Shortly after she struck a rock off Peninnis Head (SV911094) and the vessel sunk at once with some of the crew being drowned in their berths. Those on deck climbed into the rigging, and as the tide rose the ship was driven closer to land, and some managed to climb onto the shore over the jibboom. The master, pilot and eight crew drowned.

== See also ==
- SS Minnehaha – wrecked in the Isles of Scilly on 18 April 1910
- List of shipwrecks of the Isles of Scilly
