= Mark Mercer (preservationist) =

- Born: 1943 or 1944
- Died: September 16, 2019 (aged 75)
- Occupations: Preservationist, businessman
- Relatives: Sam Mercer (father)

Mark Mercer (1943 or 1944 – September 16, 2019) was an American preservationist and businessman. He is known for developing and preserving Omaha's Old Market neighborhood.

== Early life ==
Mercer was born in Omaha, Nebraska, the son of Sam Mercer, another preservationist.

== Career ==
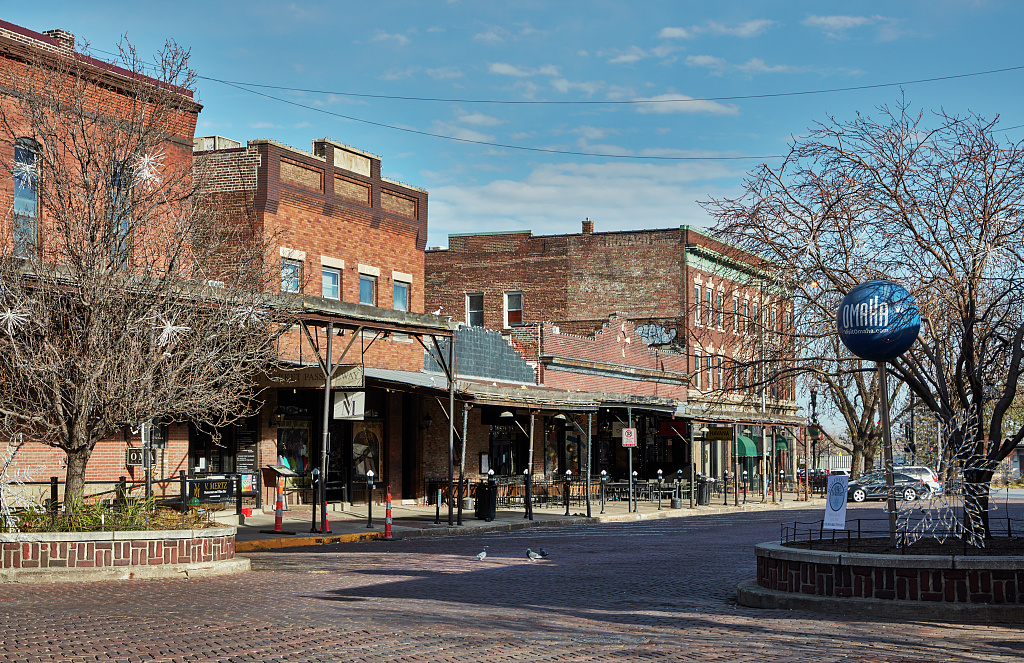
Part of the Old Market in Omaha, Nebraska

Mercer continued the work begun by his father in the 1960s. Sam Mercer began redeveloping the area around 11th Street and Howard Street in Omaha. He purchased several buildings in the face of political pressure to demolish them. In 1976, Mark Mercer began working to establish historic Old Market neighborhood as a landmark. He also worked to have the old warehouse buildings occupied by local businesses.

In 1994, Mercer, in collaboration with his father, wrote The Old Market of Omaha.

At the time of his death, the Mercer family owned La Buvette, a Parisian-style cafe on South 11th Street in Omaha, and The Boiler Room, located in the Bemis Bag Building on Jones Street.

== Personal life ==
Mercer was married to German-born Vera Mertz for fifty years. It was her second marriage.

== Death ==
Mercer died in 2019, aged 75.
