= Dr. Samuel D. Mercer House =

Historic house in Nebraska, United States

- U.S. National Register of Historic Places
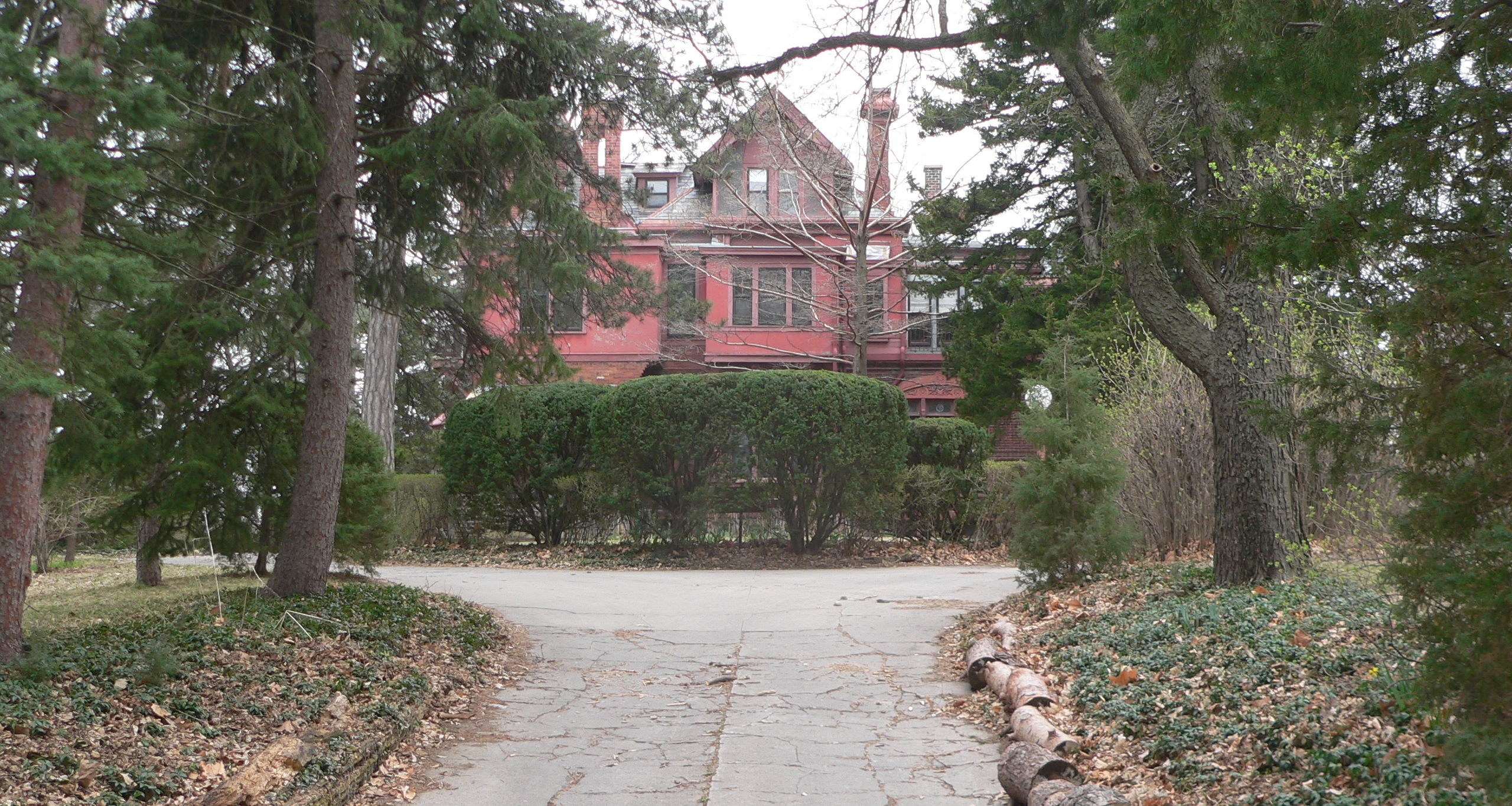
- Mercer house, seen from the southeast

- Location within Nebraska Location within the United States
- Location: 3920 Cuming Street, Omaha, Nebraska
- Coordinates: 41°16′6.6″N 95°58′19.6″W
- Built: 1885
- Architectural style: Queen Anne Revival
- NRHP reference No.: 76001130
- Added to NRHP: June 17, 1976

The Dr. Samuel D. Mercer House was built in 1885 in the historic Walnut Hill neighborhood of Omaha, Nebraska, United States. Samuel David Mercer was the chief surgeon of the Union Pacific Railroad and the founder of Omaha's first hospital.

The Mercer House is a grand 23-room red brick mansion built in the Queen Anne style, featuring a prominent three-story square tower above the south side main entrance. Constructed for $60,000, the house became the crown jewel of the neighborhood Mercer platted in the 1880s. In the 1880s, the city's cable cars stopped at the Mercer House. The house has been subdivided into apartments, and much of the elaborate Victorian trim was removed in 1926. The house was listed on the National Register of Historic Places in 1976.

== See also ==
- History of North Omaha, Nebraska
- Architecture of North Omaha, Nebraska
