= SS Minneapolis (1899) =

British ocean liner (1900–1916)

History
- Name: Minneapolis
- Namesake: Minneapolis
- Owner: Atlantic Transport Line
- Port of registry: London, United Kingdom
- Route: London - New York
- Builder: Harland & Wolff
- Yard number: 328
- Launched: 18 November 1899
- Completed: April 1900
- Acquired: April 1900
- Maiden voyage: 10 May 1900
- In service: 10 May 1900
- Out of service: 23 March 1916
- Identification: 110515; RNGJ
- Fate: Torpedoed on 23 March 1916 and sank on 25 March while under tow.

General characteristics
- Class & type: Minne-class ocean liner
- Tonnage: 13,401 GRT
- Length: 183.1 m (600 ft 9 in)
- Beam: 20 m (65 ft 7 in)
- Depth: 12 m (39 ft 4 in)
- Installed power: 2 quadruple expansion engines
- Propulsion: Double screw propellers
- Speed: 16 knots (30 km/h; 18 mph)
- Crew: 178

SS Minneapolis was a British ocean liner of 13,401 gross register tons (GRT) in operation between 1900 and 1918. She was torpedoed by SM UC-35 195 nautical miles (361 km) east of Malta in the Mediterranean Sea on 23 March 1916 with the loss of 12 of her crew, while she was travelling from Marseille, France to Alexandria, Egypt in ballast.

== Construction ==
Minneapolis was constructed in 1899 for the Atlantic Transport Line at the Harland & Wolff shipyard in Belfast, United Kingdom. She was launched on 18 November 1899 and completed in April 1900. The ship was 183.1 metres (600 ft 9 in) long, with a beam of 20 metres (65 ft 7 in) and a depth of 12 metres (39 ft 4 in). The ship was assessed at 13,401 gross register tons (GRT). She had two quadruple expansion engines driving two screw propellers and the engine was rated at 1,127 nhp. The ship could reach a maximum speed of 16 knots (30 km/h; 18 mph) and had four masts and one funnel. Minneapolis's maiden voyage on 10 May 1900, saw her sailing from London to New York.

She had six sister ships:

- Minnehaha
- Minnetonka
- Minnewaska
- Mongolia
- Manchuria
- Arabic

== Volturno incident ==
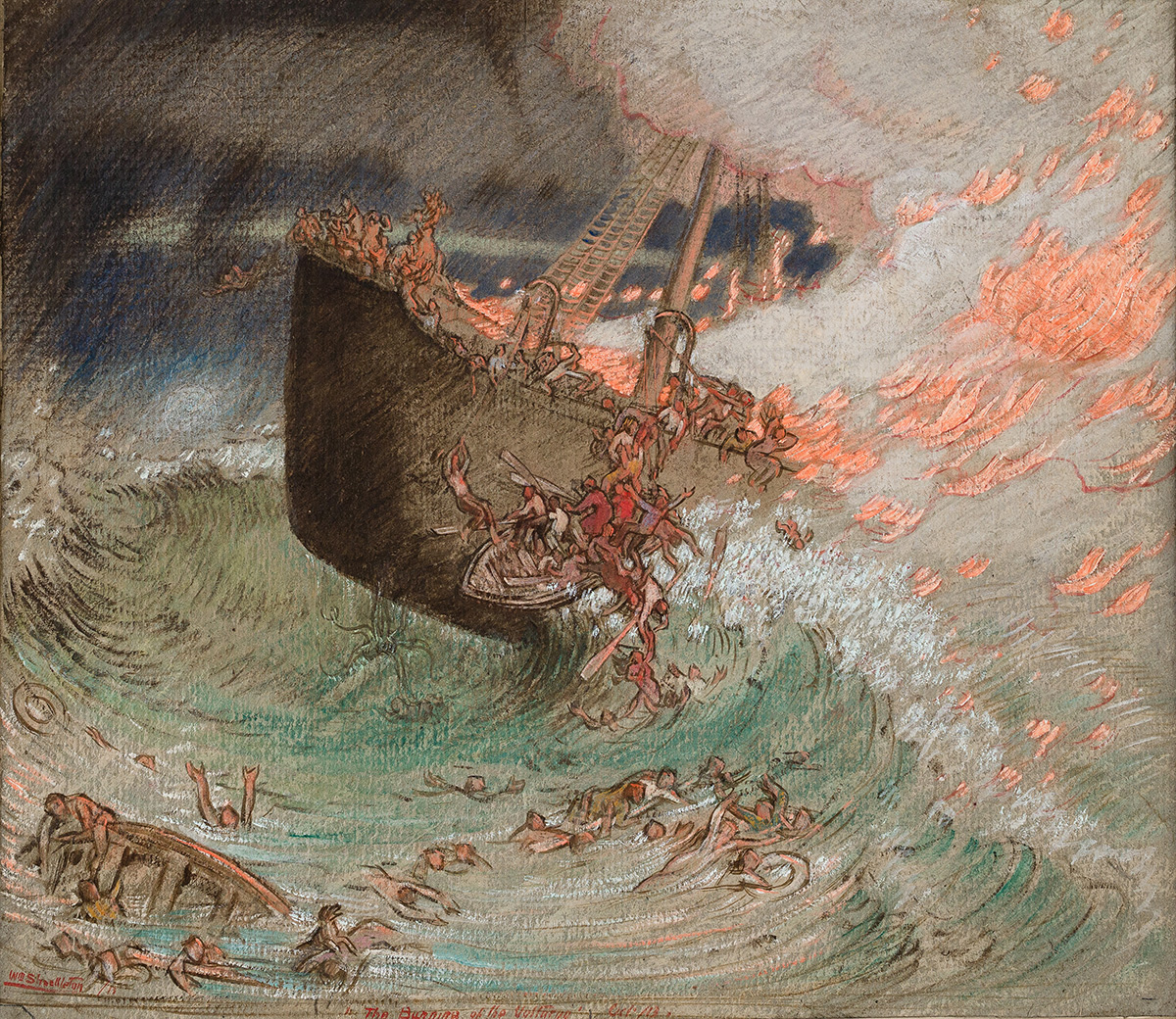
A painting by William Shackleton, portraying the sinking of SS Volturno

The Canadian ocean liner Volturno caught fire during a gale in the North Atlantic at 49°12′N 34°51′W, while she was on a voyage from Rotterdam to New York City on the morning of 9 October 1913. Volturno sent out a wireless distress call to which 11 ships responded including Minneapolis, which arrived by midnight. Minneapolis launched a single lifeboat to offer her assistance to the stricken ship, but the sea remained too rough to coordinate an effective rescue operation and the lifeboat was recovered by fellow rescue ship RMS Carmania before it was completely swamped. By dawn the following day, Minneapolis launched her remaining lifeboats, which managed to rescue 30 male passengers from Volturno. The remaining 491 survivors were picked up by the other rescue ships, while 136 were lost in the fire. Minneapolis landed the 30 survivors she took on board at Gravesend, United Kingdom on 14 October. For his actions in the rescue effort, Captain Francis Overman Hasker of the Minneapolis received the gold Sea Gallantry Medal from the Board of Trade, while 21 other members of the crew were awarded silver medals and a cash reward from the Atlantic Transport Line.

== World War I ==
Minneapolis served the London to New York route until the outbreak of the First World War in 1914, when she was requisitioned by the British Government for service as a troopship, ferrying British troops across the English Channel to the frontlines in France and Belgium.

=== Sinking ===
On 23 March 1916, Minneapolis was travelling from Marseille, France to Alexandria, Egypt with 178 crew and a single passenger on board, while carrying 60 tons of horse fodder under the command of Captain Francis Overman Hasker. She was struck amidships by a torpedo from SM UC-35 195 nautical miles (361 km) east of Malta in the Mediterranean Sea. The attack claimed the lives of 12 crew members, all of whom were present in the engine room where the torpedo detonated.

The ship however stayed afloat long enough for the destroyer HMS Sheldrake to rescue all aboard Minneapolis and land them at Southampton, while the destroyer HMS Lydiard attempted to tow her to Malta. While on route, Lydiard received assistance from HMS Nasturtium and the tugs Veteran and Milon. However, Minneapolis eventually sank on 25 March 1916, 40 hours after the attack, without the loss of further life.

== Wreck ==
The wreck of Minneapolis is believed to lie at 36°20′N 17°57′E. The current condition of the wreck is unknown.
