= 2003 Lincoln, Nebraska mayoral election =

2003 Lincoln mayoral election
- May 6, 2003

Nominee	Coleen Seng	Glenn Friendt
Party	Nonpartisan	Nonpartisan
Popular vote	24,104	23,202
Percentage	50.95%	49.05%
Mayor before election
Don Wesely
Nonpartisan
Elected Mayor
Coleen Seng
Nonpartisan

The 2003 Lincoln, Nebraska mayoral election took place on May 6, 2003, following a primary election on April 8, 2003. Incumbent Mayor Don Wesely, who was first elected in 1999, announced on January 17, 2003, that he would not seek re-election.

Though the race was officially nonpartisan, following Wesely's departure, Democrats consolidated around City Councilwoman Coleen Seng, who announced that she would run to succeed Wesely. Her opponent was Republican City Councilman Glenn Friendt, who had announced that he would run for mayor prior to Wesely's withdrawal.

In the primary election, Friendt placed first by a narrow margin, winning 52 percent of the vote to Seng's 48 percent. Both proceeded to the general election, where, in a "mild surprise," Seng defeated Friendt by a narrow margin. Seng received 51 percent of the vote to Friendt's 49 percent, despite being outspent by Friendt.

== Primary election ==
=== Candidates ===
- Glenn Friendt, City Councilman
- Coleen Seng, City Councilwoman

==== Declined ====
- Jon Camp, City Councilman
- Thor Schrock, businessman
- Don Wesely, incumbent Mayor

=== Results ===
Primary election results
Party	Candidate	Votes	%
Nonpartisan	Glenn Friendt	13,828	52.13%
Nonpartisan	Coleen Seng	12,699	47.87%
Total votes		26,527	100.00%

== General election ==
=== Results ===
2003 Lincoln mayoral election results
Party	Candidate	Votes	%
Nonpartisan	Coleen Seng	24,104	50.95%
Nonpartisan	Glenn Friendt	23,202	49.05%
Total votes		47,306	100.00%
