= 1999 Lincoln, Nebraska mayoral election =

1999 Lincoln mayoral election
- May 4, 1999

Nominee	Don Wesely	Cindy Johnson
Party	Nonpartisan	Nonpartisan
Popular vote	27,358	21,222
Percentage	56.12%	43.54%
Mayor before election
Dale Young (interim)
Nonpartisan
Elected Mayor
Don Wesely
Nonpartisan

The 1999 Lincoln, Nebraska mayoral election took place on May 4, 1999, following a primary election April 6, 1999. Mayor Mike Johanns was elected Governor in 1998 and resigned as Mayor on November 30, 1998. City Councilman Dale Young was selected to serve out the remainder of his term, and declined to run for a full term.

Five candidates ran in the election, with former State Senator Don Wesely and City Councilwoman Cindy Johnson emerging as the frontrunners. In the primary election, Wesely placed first, winning 48 percent of the vote to Johnson's 36 percent. Though the race was formally nonpartisan, Wesely, a Democrat, and Johnson, a Republican, earned support from their respective parties. Wesely ultimately won the election by a wide margin, receiving 56 percent of the vote.

== Primary election ==
=== Candidates ===
- Don Wesely, former State Senator
- Cindy Johnson, City Councilwoman
- Jim Wrenholt, civic activist, businessman
- Terry Kubicek, attorney and farmer
- Randall Reichert, University of Nebraska–Lincoln student

==== Declined ====
- Jim Gordon, attorney

=== Results ===
Primary election results
Party	Candidate	Votes	%
Nonpartisan	Don Wesely	14,111	48.25%
Nonpartisan	Cindy Johnson	10,606	36.27%
Nonpartisan	Jim Wrenholt	2,189	7.49%
Nonpartisan	Terry Kubicek	1,248	4.27%
Nonpartisan	Randall Reichert	1,050	3.59%
Write-in		41	0.14%
Total votes		29,245	100.00%

== General election ==
=== Results ===
1999 Lincoln mayoral election results
Party	Candidate	Votes	%
Nonpartisan	Don Wesely	27,358	56.12%
Nonpartisan	Cindy Johnson	21,222	43.54%
Write-in		166	0.34%
Total votes		48,746	100.00%
