= 1998 Nebraska gubernatorial election =

- November 3, 1998
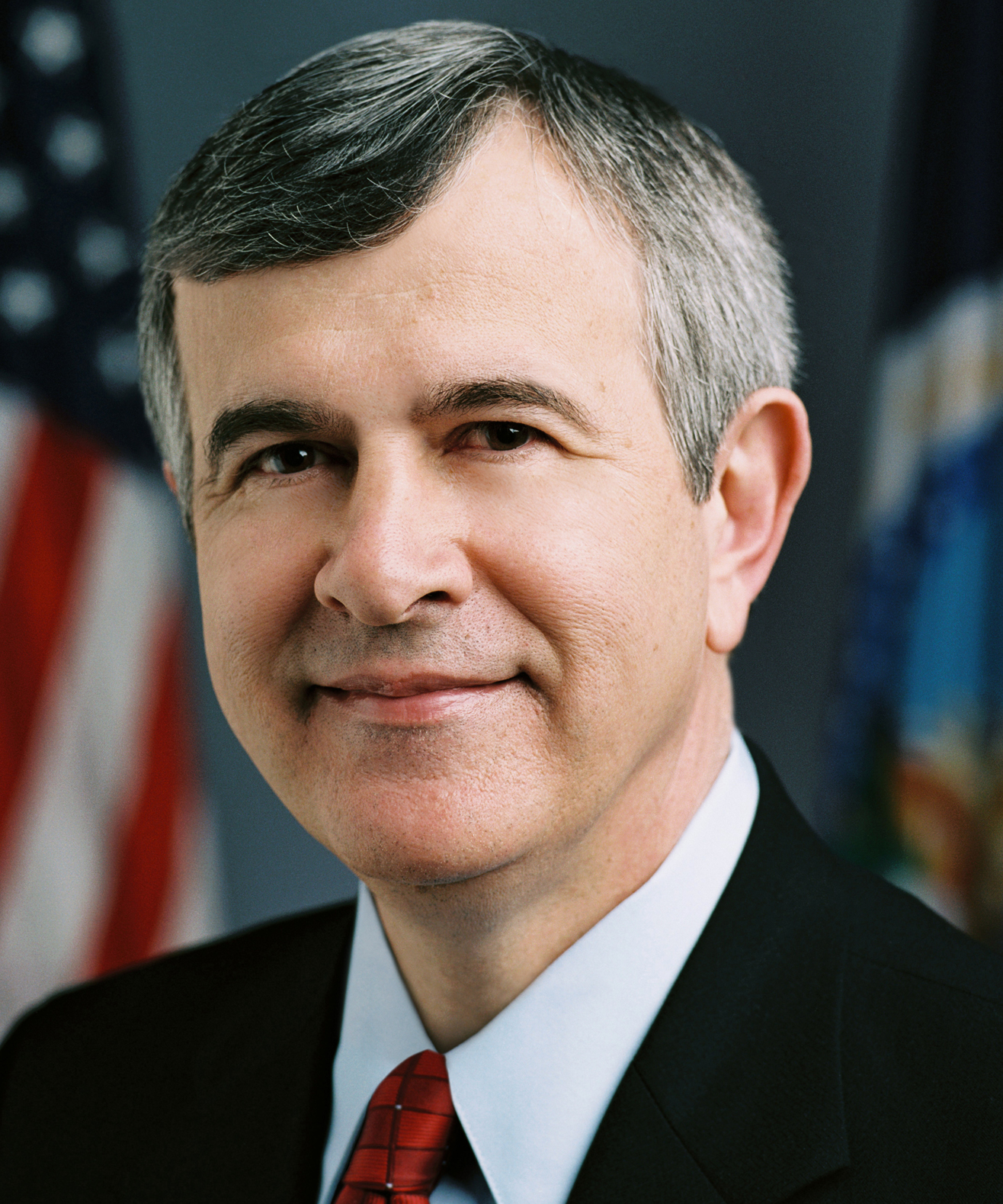

Nominee	Mike Johanns	Bill Hoppner
Party	Republican	Democratic
Running mate	David Maurstad	Pam Bataillon
Popular vote	293,910	250,678
Percentage	53.90%	45.98%
- County results Johanns: 50–60% 60–70% 70–80% Hoppner: 50–60% 60–70% 70–80%
Governor before election
Ben Nelson
Democratic
Elected Governor
Mike Johanns
Republican

The 1998 Nebraska gubernatorial election was held on November 3, 1998. Term limits prevented incumbent Governor Ben Nelson, a Democrat, from seeking a third term in office. Republican nominee Mike Johanns, Mayor of Lincoln, defeated Democratic nominee, attorney Bill Hoppner. As of 2026, this was the last gubernatorial election in Nebraska in which the margin of victory was within single digits. Johanns later served Nebraska in the United States Senate with Nelson from 2009 to 2013.

== Democratic primary ==
=== Governor ===
==== Candidates ====
- Bill Hoppner, attorney, Chief of Staff to former Governor James Exon and Senator Bob Kerrey and gubernatorial candidate in 1990
- James D. McFarland, state senator
- Robb Nimic, perennial candidate
- Luis R. Calvillo

==== Results ====
Democratic gubernatorial primary results
Party	Candidate	Votes	%
Democratic	Bill Hoppner	72,887	65.39
Democratic	James D. McFarland	33,890	30.41
Democratic	Robb Nimic	1,621	1.45
Democratic	Write-ins	1,606	1.44
Democratic	Luis R. Calvillo	1,455	1.31
Total votes		111,459	100.00

=== Lieutenant governor ===
==== Candidates ====
Pam Bataillon ran unopposed for the Democratic nomination for lieutenant governor. She was the vice president of the Visiting Nurse Association from Omaha, Nebraska. She is the wife of Joseph Bataillon, a federal judge who was prevented from participating in her campaign due to judicial ethics requirements.

==== Results ====
Democratic lieutenant gubernatorial primary results
Party	Candidate	Votes	%
Democratic	Pam Bataillon	87,971	98.61
Democratic	Write-ins	1,237	1.39
Total votes		89,208	100.00

== Republican primary ==
=== Governor ===
==== Candidates ====
- Mike Johanns, Mayor of Lincoln
- John Breslow, Nebraska State Auditor
- Jon Christensen, U.S. Congressman
- Barry Richards, perennial candidate
- Lavern Bartels

==== Results ====
Republican gubernatorial primary results
Party	Candidate	Votes	%
Republican	Mike Johanns	88,173	40.02
Republican	John Breslow	65,806	29.87
Republican	Jon Christensen	62,107	28.19
Republican	Barry Richards	2,036	0.92
Republican	Lavern Bartels	1,908	0.87
Republican	Write-ins	285	0.13
Total votes		220,315	100.00

=== Lieutenant governor ===
==== Candidates ====
- Matt Butler, businessman and CEO of Butler Holdings Inc., which owned Happy Cab and Hunt Transportation, from Omaha, Nebraska
- John DeCamp, attorney, lobbyist, former member of the Nebraska Legislature in District 40 from 1971 to 1987 from Clatonia, Nebraska, and unsuccessful candidate for the Republican nomination for governor in 1994
- Kevin Fry, president of Fry Brothers Fertilizer and Chemical Inc. from Ewing, Nebraska
- David Maurstad, president and owner of Maurstad Insurance Services Inc., former mayor of Beatrice, Nebraska, and member of the Nebraska Legislature in District 30 since 1995 from Beatrice, Nebraska
- Elliott L. Rustad, dermatologist from Lincoln, Nebraska, and a political newcomer

==== Results ====
Republican lieutenant gubernatorial primary results
Party	Candidate	Votes	%
Republican	David Maurstad	61,778	31.18
Republican	Elliott L. Rustad	54,580	27.55
Republican	Matt Butler	35,133	17.73
Republican	John DeCamp	24,057	12.14
Republican	Kevin Fry	22,252	11.23
Republican	Write-ins	304	0.15
Total votes		198,104	100.00

== General election ==
=== Polling ===
Poll source	Date(s) administered	Sample size (Note: Key: A – all adults RV – registered voters LV – likely voters V – unclear)	Margin of error	Bill Hoppner (D)	Mike Johanns (R)	Undecided
Mason Dixon	October 26–28, 1998	807 (LV)	± 3.5%	39%	54%	7%
Mason Dixon	October 13–14, 1998	828 (LV)	± 3.5%	34%	54%	12%
Mason Dixon	May 4–5, 1998	812 (RV)	± 3.4%	32%	46%	22%

=== Results ===
Nebraska gubernatorial election, 1998
Party	Candidate	Votes	%	±%
Republican	Mike Johanns	293,910	53.90%	+28.33%
Democratic	Bill Hoppner	250,678	45.98%	−27.06%
Write-ins		650	0.12%	
Majority		43,232	7.93%	−39.53%
Turnout		545,238		
Republican gain from Democratic		Swing		

==== By County ====
By county

County	Person Democratic		Person Republican		Various candidates Other parties		Margin		Total votes
County	#	%	#	%	#	%	#	%	Total votes
Adams County									
Antelope County									
Arthur County									
Banner County									
Blaine County									
Boone County									
Box Butte County									
Boyd County									
Brown County									
Buffalo County									
Burt County									
Butler County									
Cass County									
Cedar County									
Chase County									
Cherry County									
Cheyenne County									
Clay County									
Colfax County									
Cuming County									
Custer County									
Dakota County									
Dawes County									
Dawson County									
Deuel County									
Dixon County									
Dodge County									
Douglas County									
Dundy County									
Fillmore County									
Franklin County									
Frontier County									
Furnas County									
Gage County									
Garden County									
Garfield County									
Gosper County									
Grant County									
Greeley County									
Hall County									
Hamilton County									
Hayes County									
Hitchcock County									
Holt County									
Hooker County									
Howard County									
Jefferson County									
Johnson County									
Kearney County									
Keith County									
Keya Paha County									
Kimball County									
Knox County									
Lancaster County									
Lincoln County									
Logan County									
Loup County									
Madison County									
McPherson County									
Merrick County									
Morrill County									
Nance County									
Nance County									
Nemaha County									
Nuckolls County									
Otoe County									
Pawnee County									
Perkins County									
Phelps County									
Pierce County									
Platte County									
Polk County									
Red Willow County									
Richardson County									
Rock County									
Saline County									
Sarpy County									
Saunders County									
Scotts Bluff County									
Seward County									
Sheridan County									
Sioux County									
Stanton County									
Thayer County									
Stanton County									
Thurston County									
Valley County									
Washington County									
Wayne County									
Webster County									
Wheeler County									
York County									
Totals									

== See also ==
- 1998 Nebraska Amendment 1
