= Dale Young =

Dale Young may refer to:

- C. Dale Young (born 1969), American poet and writer, physician, editor and educator
- Dale Young (politician) (1928–2022), mayor of Lincoln, Nebraska
- Dale Young, engineer and founder of non-governmental organization MSABI
- Dale L. Young, United States Air Force officer, namesake of the Young Glacier
