= Frank C. Zehrung =

American theater manager and politician

Mayor of Lincoln, Nebraska
- In office May 13, 1913 – May 10, 1915
- Preceded by: Alvin H. Armstrong
- Succeeded by: Charles W. Bryan
- In office May 9, 1921 – May 9, 1927
- Preceded by: John Eschelman Miller
- Succeeded by: Verne Hedge
- In office May 11, 1931 – May 8, 1933
- Preceded by: Don Lathrop Love
- Succeeded by: Fenton B. Fleming

Personal details
- Born: October 7, 1858 Cedar Rapids, Iowa, U.S.
- Died: September 8, 1942 (aged 83) Van Nuys, California, U.S.
- Party: Republican
- Spouse: Jessie Voris
- Education: University of Nebraska
- Occupation: Theater manager

Frank Connell Zehrung (born Cedar Rapids, Iowa, October 7, 1858; died Van Nuys, California, September 8, 1942) was an American theater manager, businessman, and politician, best known for serving five two-year terms as the mayor of Lincoln, Nebraska.

== Early life ==
Zehrung was the son of John Zehrung (1831-1908), a druggist and salesman, and Mary (Connell) Zehrung (1835-1893). The family moved to Omaha in Zehrung's boyhood; his father operated a White Sewing Machine Company dealership there. Later the family moved to Blair and finally to Lincoln.

Zehrung attended Lincoln High School and then spent two years at the University of Nebraska. By 1888 he was described as a druggist and capitalist and a handsome man just short of six feet tall whose "only fault is an unfortunate passion for baseball."

== Business career ==
In 1889 Zehrung spent six months managing Lincoln's Funke Opera House; after remodeling, he was again the manager from 1894 to 1900. From 1899 to 1917 he managed the Oliver Theater in Lincoln. With partners Lester M. Crawford (1845-1944) of Kansas and Clarence U. Philley (1866-1933) of Missouri, Zehrung managed and booked theaters all across the Midwest in the early 20th century. During World War I Zehrung volunteered, despite his age, and ran a theater for troops at Camp Stuart in Newport News, Virginia. Zehrung retired from the theater business after the war.

He built a large three-story townhouse at 1225 P Street in Lincoln with a connection to a livery barn that became the home of the Zehrung Outdoor Advertising Company.

In 1916 Zehrung was elected president of the Western League, a minor baseball league. He served for two seasons but was criticized for his lack of baseball knowledge and was not re-elected.

== Politics and fraternal organizations ==
Zehrung served several terms as president of the Rotary Club and led the local Elks Club.

In 1913 friends talked him into running for City Council. Not only did he win, but he was then elected mayor, 1913 being the first year that the mayoralty was chosen by the council instead of being popularly elected. Zehrung served as mayor from 1913 to 1915, 1921–1927, and 1931–1933, five two-year terms.

== Family ==
Zehrung married Jessie Voris (1881-1944).

Zehrung's uncle Henry Crowell Zehrung was also a prominent Lincoln businessman. He had also lived in Blair and moved to Lincoln about the time that his brother, Zehrung's father, did. Despondent over the state of his business due to the Panic of 1896, Henry committed suicide on December 30, 1896.

Zehrung and his family are buried in Wyuka Cemetery in Lincoln.
