= 2015 Lincoln, Nebraska mayoral election =

2015 Lincoln mayoral election
- May 5, 2015
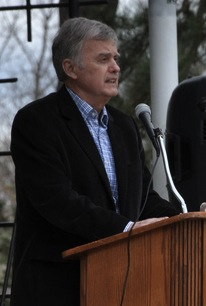

| Candidate | Chris Beutler | Andy Stebbing |
| Popular vote | 24,610 | 21,840 |
| Percentage | 52.92% | 46.96% |
Mayor before election
Chris Beutler
Democratic
Elected mayor
Chris Beutler
Democratic

The 2015 Lincoln, Nebraska mayoral election took place on May 5, 2015. Incumbent Mayor Chris Beutler ran for re-election to a third term. He defeated Lancaster County Treasurer Andy Stebbing by a slim margin, winning 53% of the vote.

== Primary ==
=== Candidates ===
- Chris Beutler, incumbent Mayor of Lincoln
- Andy Stebbing, Lancaster County Treasurer
- Rene Solc, contractor

=== Results ===
2015 Lincoln mayoral primary election results
| Party | Candidate | Votes | % |
|---|---|---|---|
| Nonpartisan | Chris Beutler (inc.) | 19,342 | 52.90% |
| Nonpartisan | Andy Stebbing | 16,007 | 43.78% |
| Nonpartisan | Rene Solc | 1,175 | 3.21% |
| Write-in | | 37 | 0.10% |
| Total votes | | 36,561 | 100.00% |

== General election ==
=== Results ===
2015 Lincoln mayoral general election results
| Party | Candidate | Votes | % |
|---|---|---|---|
| Nonpartisan | Chris Beutler (inc.) | 24,610 | 52.92% |
| Nonpartisan | Andy Stebbing | 21,840 | 46.96% |
| Write-in | | 58 | 0.12% |
| Total votes | | 46,508 | 100.00% |
