= William Swanson (Nebraska politician) =

American politician (1922–2007)

Member of the Nebraska Legislature from the 27th district
- In office January 13, 1967 – January 3, 1973
- Preceded by: Marvin Stromer
- Succeeded by: Steve Fowler

Personal details
- Born: December 20, 1922 Sutton, Nebraska
- Died: January 23, 2007 (aged 84) Lincoln, Nebraska
- Party: Republican
- Spouse: Mary Helen Augustine (m. 1954)
- Children: 1
- Education: University of Nebraska
- Occupation: Real estate, university administrator

Military service
- Allegiance: United States
- Branch/service: United States Army

William F. "Bill" Swanson (December 20, 1922 – January 23, 2007) was a Republican politician from Nebraska who served as a member of the Nebraska Legislature from the 27th district from 1967 to 1973.

== Early life ==
Swanson was born in Sutton, Nebraska, in 1922, and graduated from Sutton High School in 1940. He served in the U.S. Army in World War II, and was deployed to North Africa. Upon returning to Nebraska, he attended the University of Nebraska, receiving his bachelor's degree in business administration in 1947. He worked for the Nebraska Real Estate Commission after graduating, and was the director of the commission from 1951 to 1965.

== Nebraska Legislature ==
In 1967, following the resignation of State Senator Marvin Stromer, Governor Norbert Tiemann appointed Swanson to serve out the remainder of Swanson's term, which expired in 1969. Swanson ran for a full term in 1968, He was challenged by former State Railway Commissioner Richard Larson and construction executive Adolph Hock. In the primary, Swanson received 57 percent of the vote, and proceeded to the general election with Larson, who received 25 percent. In the general election, Swanson defeated Larson with 60 percent of the vote.

Swanson ran for a second full term in 1972, and was challenged by Larson, NU student body president Steve Fowler, insurance agent R. Stanley Sorensen, and activist Hubert Wisnieski. In the primary, Swanson received 33 percent of the vote, and advanced to the general election with Fowler, who placed second with 26 percent. Following a close campaign, Swanson narrowly lost to Fowler, receiving 49 percent of the vote to Fowler's 51 percent.

== Post-legislative career ==
After leaving the legislature, Swanson worked for the University of Nebraska system. He was appointed corporation secretary for the Board of Regents and as vice president for governmental relations in 1974. Swanson stepped down as vice president in 1986, and retired in 1990.

== Death ==
Swanson died on January 23, 2007.
