= Stephanie Johanns =

American politician and businessperson

First Lady of Nebraska
- In office January 7, 1999 – January 20, 2005
- Governor: Mike Johanns
- Preceded by: Diane Nelson
- Succeeded by: Sally Ganem

Member of the Nebraska Legislature from the 27th district
- In office May 13, 1987 – January 4, 1989
- Preceded by: Bill Harris
- Succeeded by: DiAnna Schimek

Personal details
- Born: Arizona, U.S.
- Party: Republican
- Spouse: Mike Johanns
- Education: University of Minnesota

Stephanie A. Johanns (née Armitage) is an American politician and businessperson. She is a former first lady of Nebraska and member of the Nebraska Legislature. Johanns was a county commissioner for Lancaster County.

== Early life and education ==
Johanns is from Arizona. She graduated from high school in Elkhart, Indiana and completed a degree in psychology at the University of Minnesota in 1977. She married Mike Armitage. They divorced in 1985 with no children. She married Mike Johanns on December 24, 1986. She is a Republican and a conservative Catholic.

== Career ==
In 1985, Johanns was a part-time manager of the Greater Lincoln Private Industry Council. She left the post on November 25, 1985 to work as the information center coordinator at Lincoln Telephone Company. In that role, she oversaw three employees supporting the internal computer users. Johanns was a county commissioner for Lancaster County.

Nebraska governor Kay A. Orr appointed Johanns to the Nebraska Legislature to fill the vacancy created by Bill Harris when he became the mayor of Lincoln. She was sworn in on May 13, 1987, and did not seek re-election in 1988.

In 1998, the Girl Scouts presented Johanns the Spirit of Girl Scout Award.

Johanns, the wife of Mike Johanns, was the First Lady of Nebraska from 1999 to 2005. Johanns was the honorary chair of the Nebraska Volunteer Service Commission. She was awarded the 2001 leader in communication honor by the Lincoln chapter of the International Association of Business Communicators.

In 2004, she was the vice president of external affairs for Alltel in Lincoln. Johanns is a senior vice president at Verizon in Washington, D.C.
