= 2002 Nebraska gubernatorial election =

- November 5, 2002
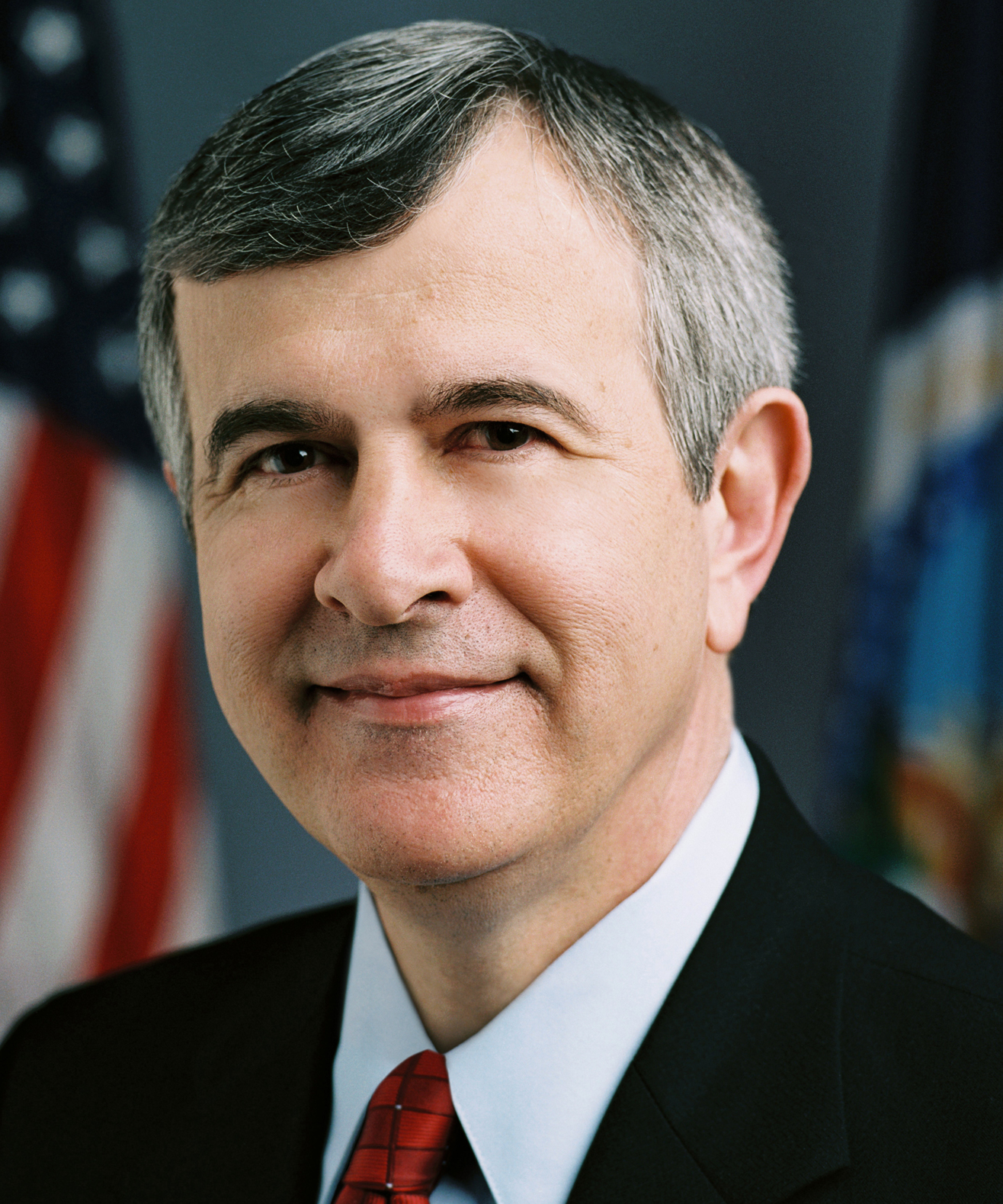

Nominee	Mike Johanns	Stormy Dean
Party	Republican	Democratic
Running mate	Dave Heineman	Melany Chesterman
Popular vote	330,349	132,348
Percentage	68.68%	27.52%
- County results Johanns: 50–60% 60–70% 70–80% 80–90%
Governor before election
Mike Johanns
Republican
Elected Governor
Mike Johanns
Republican

The 2002 Nebraska gubernatorial election, held on November 5, 2002, featured incumbent Republican Governor of Nebraska Mike Johanns defeating his Democratic opponent Stormy Dean in a landslide.

This was the first gubernatorial election in Nebraska where the winning primary candidates chose their running mates after the primary election. Prior to this, both the governor and the lieutenant governor were chosen at the primary election. This was also the first Nebraska gubernatorial election in which a Republican was re-elected since 1956.

== Republican Party primary ==
=== Candidates ===
- Mike Johanns, incumbent Governor of Nebraska
- Robert J. Wicht

=== Results ===
Republican Party primary results
Party	Candidate	Votes	%
Republican	Mike Johanns (incumbent)	128,277	86.84
Republican	Robert J. Wicht	19,441	13.16
Total votes		147,718	100

== Democratic Party primary ==
=== Candidates ===
- Stormy Dean, insurance company executive
- Luis R. Calvillo

=== Results ===
Democratic Party primary results
Party	Candidate	Votes	%
Democratic	Stormy Dean	47,369	77.26
Democratic	Luis R. Calvillo	13,943	22.74
Total votes		61,312	100

== Nebraska Party primary ==
=== Candidates ===
- Paul A. Rosberg, farmer

=== Results ===
Nebraska Party primary results
Party	Candidate	Votes	%
Nebraska	Paul A. Rosberg	36	100.00
Total votes		36	100.00

== General election ==
=== Predictions ===
Source	Ranking	As of
The Cook Political Report	Safe R	October 31, 2002
Sabato's Crystal Ball	Safe R	November 4, 2002

=== Results ===
Nebraska gubernatorial election, 2002
Party	Candidate	Votes	%	±%
Republican	Mike Johanns (incumbent)	330,349	68.68%	+14.78%
Democratic	Stormy Dean	132,348	27.52%	−18.46%
Nebraska	Paul A. Rosberg	18,294	3.80%	
Majority		198,001	41.17%	+33.24%
Turnout		480,991		
Republican hold		Swing		

==== By County ====
By county

County	Person Democratic		Person Republican		Various candidates Other parties		Margin		Total votes
County	#	%	#	%	#	%	#	%	Total votes
Adams County									
Antelope County									
Arthur County									
Banner County									
Blaine County									
Boone County									
Box Butte County									
Boyd County									
Brown County									
Buffalo County									
Burt County									
Butler County									
Cass County									
Cedar County									
Chase County									
Cherry County									
Cheyenne County									
Clay County									
Colfax County									
Cuming County									
Custer County									
Dakota County									
Dawes County									
Dawson County									
Deuel County									
Dixon County									
Dodge County									
Douglas County									
Dundy County									
Fillmore County									
Franklin County									
Frontier County									
Furnas County									
Gage County									
Garden County									
Garfield County									
Gosper County									
Grant County									
Greeley County									
Hall County									
Hamilton County									
Hayes County									
Hitchcock County									
Holt County									
Hooker County									
Howard County									
Jefferson County									
Johnson County									
Kearney County									
Keith County									
Keya Paha County									
Kimball County									
Knox County									
Lancaster County									
Lincoln County									
Logan County									
Loup County									
Madison County									
McPherson County									
Merrick County									
Morrill County									
Nance County									
Nance County									
Nemaha County									
Nuckolls County									
Otoe County									
Pawnee County									
Perkins County									
Phelps County									
Pierce County									
Platte County									
Polk County									
Red Willow County									
Richardson County									
Rock County									
Saline County									
Sarpy County									
Saunders County									
Scotts Bluff County									
Seward County									
Sheridan County									
Sioux County									
Stanton County									
Thayer County									
Stanton County									
Thurston County									
Valley County									
Washington County									
Wayne County									
Webster County									
Wheeler County									
York County									
Totals									

==== Counties that flipped from Democratic to Republican ====
- Thurston (largest village: Pender)
- Burt (largest village: Tekamah)
- Lancaster (largest city: Lincoln)
- Saline (largest city: Crete)
- Cuming (largest city: West Point)
- Dakota (largest city: South Sioux City)
- Cedar (largest city: Hartington)
- Dixon (largest city: Wakefield)
- Knox (largest city: Creighton)
- Nance (largest city: Fullerton)
- Boone (largest city: Albion)
- Greeley (largest city: Spalding)
- Howard (largest city: St. Paul)
- Sherman (largest city: Loup City)
- Fillmore (largest city: Geneva)
- Gage (largest city: Beatrice)
- Jefferson (largest city: Fairbury)
- Johnson (largest city: Tecumseh)
- Pawnee (largest city: Pawnee City)
- Thayer (largest city: Hebron)
- Webster (largest city: Red Cloud)
- Nuckolls (largest city: Superior)
- Franklin (largest city: Franklin)
