= 2011 Lincoln, Nebraska mayoral election =

2011 Lincoln mayoral election
- May 3, 2011
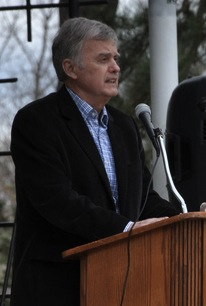

Candidate	Chris Beutler	Tammy Buffington
Popular vote	21,368	11,566
Percentage	64.68%	35.01%
Mayor before election
Chris Beutler
Democratic
Elected mayor
Chris Beutler
Democratic

The 2011 Lincoln, Nebraska mayoral election took place on May 3, 2011. Incumbent Mayor Chris Beutler ran for re-election to a second term. He defeated businesswoman Tammy Buffington with 65% of the vote.

== Primary ==
=== Candidates ===
- Chris Beutler, incumbent Mayor of Lincoln
- Tammy Buffington, businesswoman

=== Results ===
2011 Lincoln mayoral primary election results
Party	Candidate	Votes	%
Nonpartisan	Chris Beutler (inc.)	13,974	66.33%
Nonpartisan	Tammy Buffington	7,017	33.31%
Write-in		77	0.37%
Total votes		21,068	100.00%

== General election ==
=== Results ===
2011 Lincoln mayoral general election results
Party	Candidate	Votes	%
Nonpartisan	Chris Beutler (inc.)	21,368	64.68%
Nonpartisan	Tammy Buffington	11,566	35.01%
Write-in		103	0.31%
Total votes		32,037	100.00%
