= Chris Beutler =

American politician

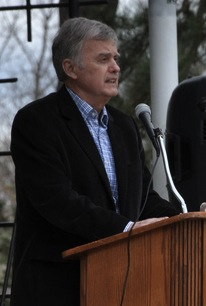

51st Mayor of Lincoln
- In office May 14, 2007 – May 20, 2019
- Preceded by: Coleen Seng
- Succeeded by: Leirion Gaylor Baird

Chair of the Executive Board of the Nebraska Legislature
- In office 1985–1987
- Preceded by: Vard Johnson
- Succeeded by: Bernice Labedz

Member of the Nebraska Legislature from the 28th district
- In office January 9, 1991 – January 3, 2007
- Preceded by: Jim McFarland
- Succeeded by: Bill Avery
- In office January 3, 1979 – January 7, 1987
- Preceded by: Roland Luedtke
- Succeeded by: James McFarland

Personal details
- Born: November 14, 1944 (age 81) Omaha, Nebraska, U.S.
- Party: Democratic
- Education: Yale University (BA); University of Nebraska–Lincoln (JD)

Chris Beutler (born November 14, 1944) is an American politician and former Mayor of Lincoln, Nebraska, having served from 2007 to 2019. A member of the Democratic Party, he previously served in the Nebraska Legislature from 1979 to 1986 and from 1991 to 2006.

== Early life and education ==
Born in Omaha, Nebraska, Beutler graduated from Omaha Benson High School in 1962, Yale University in 1966, and University of Nebraska College of Law in 1973. He was a U.S. Peace Corps teacher in Turkey from 1966 to 1967 and 1st lieutenant in the U.S. Army from 1969 to 1971. He is married to Judy Beutler and between them they have five children, daughters Lori, Alexa, Erica, Mikahla, and son Sam, as well as seven grandchildren.

== Political career ==
Beutler was elected to the Nebraska Legislature in 1978 to represent Central Lincoln's 28th Nebraska legislative district and reelected in 1982. He resigned in 1986 and was reelected in 1990, 1994, 1998, and 2002. In his last term he sat on the Appropriations, Executive Board, and Reference committees and was the chairperson of the Legislative Performance Audit committee. Because of term limits, Beutler was not eligible for another consecutive legislative term.

Beutler announced his candidacy for mayor of Lincoln, Nebraska on September 15, 2006, after the incumbent mayor Coleen Seng, a fellow Democrat, chose not to seek re-election. He focused on a campaign theme of establishing Lincoln as a great city by promoting safety and security, an exceptional economy, and a "unique sense of place."

His opponents in the primary held on Tuesday, April 3, 2007, were Nebraska Party candidate Mike Deal, Republican city councilman Ken Svoboda and Independent Roger Yant. The results after 191 precincts reporting, former state senator Beutler walked away with 48 percent of the votes, compared to Republican City Councilman Ken Svoboda's 35 percent. They were trailed by independent candidate Roger Yant with 14 percent, and Nebraska Party candidate Mike Deal at 3 percent. In the general election on May 1, Beutler defeated Svoboda by 845 votes, 51%-49%. He was inaugurated for his first term on May 14, 2007.

He ran for re-election in 2011 and was opposed by Republican businesswoman Tammy Buffington. In the April 5 primary election, Beutler received 66 percent of the votes, compared to Buffington's 33 percent. In the May 3 general election, Beutler defeated Buffington 64.68%-35.01%.

Beutler announced his candidacy for a third term on January 13, 2015. His opponents for the April 7 primary election were Republican Lancaster County Treasurer Andy Stebbing and Independent Rene Solc. The results from Lincoln's 172 precincts gave Beutler 52.90 percent of the votes, compared to Stebbing's 42.78 percent and Solc's 3.21 percent. In the May 5 general election, Beutler defeated Stebbing 52.92%-46.96%, becoming the first mayor in Lincoln's history to be elected to a third term.

In the summer of 2018, several prominent Republican politicians successfully led a petition drive for an amendment to the city charter that would limit the Lincoln mayor to serving three consecutive terms. This amendment was specifically worded to prohibit Beutler from running for a fourth term the following year. On November 6, 2018, Lincoln voters passed the measure by a margin of 53.14% to 46.86%.

Political offices
Preceded by Coleen Seng	Mayor of Lincoln; 2007–2019	Succeeded by Leirion Gaylor Baird
