= Don Lathrop Love =

American politician (1863–1940)

20th and 27th Mayor of Lincoln, Nebraska
- In office May 13, 1929 – May 11, 1931
- Preceded by: Verne Hedge
- Succeeded by: Frank C. Zehrung
- In office May 11, 1909 – May 8, 1911
- Preceded by: Francis W. Brown
- Succeeded by: Alvin H. Armstrong

Personal details
- Born: March 7, 1863 Janesville, Wisconsin, U.S.
- Died: September 12, 1940 (aged 77) Lincoln, Nebraska, U.S.
- Party: Republican
- Spouse: Julia Larrabee (m. 1891)
- Children: Charles Burton Robbins (adopted)
- Relatives: William Larrabee (father-in-law); Anna Matilda Larrabee (mother-in-law)
- Occupation: Politician

Don Lathrop Love (March 7, 1863 – September 12, 1940) was mayor of Lincoln, Nebraska in two non-consecutive terms, 1909–11 and 1929-31. He was born in Janesville, Wisconsin, on March 7, 1863, and died in Lincoln on September 12, 1940.

He married Julia Larrabee, daughter of Iowa governor William Larrabee and his wife, Anna Matilda Larrabee, on August 18, 1891. Though childless, they adopted an orphan boy, Charles Burton Robbins whom they raised as their own son. Charles Burton Robbins was buried in Arlington National Cemetery in 1943 with full military honors.

Love is now remembered in Lincoln for his gifts to higher education:

- In 1939, Love donated money to Union College to build an industrial building on campus and established a life annuity with the college a year later in 1940, two weeks before his death, that paid for the expansion of the Love Building to house a broom shop and a furniture factory. The Don Love Building at Union College has since been renovated and now houses the Ella Johnston Crandall Library, Campus Store, Career Center, Student Center, Teaching Leaning Center and the International Rescue and Relief (IRR) program.
- A posthumous gift in 1941 built the original university library of the University of Nebraska–Lincoln, and the Love Library is named for him.

== Notes ==
Preceded by Francis W. Brown	Mayor of Lincoln; 1909 - 1911	Succeeded by Alvin H. Armstrong
Preceded by Verne Hedge	Mayor of Lincoln; 1929 - 1931	Succeeded by Frank C. Zehrung
