= 1998 Nebraska Amendment 1 =

Referendum to guarantee equal protection under the law

- November 3, 1998
- A constitutional amendment to provide that no person shall be denied the equal protection of the laws.

Results
| Choice | Votes | % |
|---|---|---|
| Yes | 336,672 | 72.62% |
| No | 126,951 | 27.38% |
County results
Yes
70–80%
60–70%
50–60%
No
50–60%

1998 Nebraska Amendment 1 was a proposed amendment to the Constitution of Nebraska to guarantee every person "the equal protection of the laws". The amendment was symbolic, as the United States Constitution had already guaranteed this protection since the passage of the Fourteenth Amendment in 1868. Placed on the ballot by Legislative Resolution 20CA, the ballot measure passed, receiving over 72% of the vote and the backing of all but one of the state's 93 counties. Supporters of the measure included State Senator Doug Kristensen, the Lincoln Journal Star, and the Star-Herald, while opponents included State Senator Kate Witek and the Omaha World-Herald.

== Background ==
In 1868, the Fourteenth Amendment to the United States Constitution was adopted. The amendment included the Equal Protection Clause, which provides that no one can be denied "equal protection of the laws." While Nebraska's Constitution had provided since 1875 that "[n]o person shall be deprived of life, liberty, or property, without due process of law," it did not mention equal protection.

=== Legislation for Amendment 1 ===
Legislative Resolution 20CA placed the amendment on the ballot. Introduced by Senators Doug Kristensen, Jerome Warner, Ron Withem, and DiAnna Schimek, the resolution was passed by Nebraska's unicameral legislature in a 42–2 vote on May 21, 1997. Those in opposition were Senators Kate Witek and Cap Dierks.

== Endorsements ==
=== Support ===
Arguments from those in favor of the measure included that adding the language signified fairness, that it would add to the constitution fundamental values, that it would add to the constitution "a traditional American value," and that Nebraska's Constitution should guarantee equality.

Yes

State legislators

- Doug Kristensen, state senator from the 37th district (1989–2002) (Republican)

Newspapers

- Lincoln Journal Star
- Star-Herald

=== Opposition ===
Arguments from those in opposition to the measure included that it could lead to the legalization of same-sex marriage, that the state's school finance system could be "upset", that affirmative action could be outlawed, and that it was unnecessary because of the U.S. Constitution's guarantees.

No

State legislators

- Kate Witek, state legislator from the 31st district (1993–1999) (Republican)

Newspapers

- Omaha World-Herald

== Contents and amendment ==
=== Contents ===
The amendment, which was decided by voters on November 3, 1998, alongside the 1998 Nebraska elections, had the following information shown to voters for it:

Proposed by the

1997 Legislature

Proposed Amendment No. 1

A vote FOR this proposal will amend section 3, article I (the Bill of Rights), by adding to the due process of law clause an equal protection clause providing that no person shall be denied "the equal protection of the laws."

A vote AGAINST this proposal will not add an equal protection of the laws clause to section 3 of Article 1.

A constitutional amendment to provide that no person shall be denied the equal protection of the laws.

[] For

[] Against

=== Amendment ===
The measure amended the Constitution of Nebraska to read as follows:

I-3 No person shall be deprived of life, liberty, or property, without due process of law, nor be denied equal protection of the laws.

== Results ==
92 counties voted in favor, and 1 voted against. The highest level of support for the amendment came from Lancaster County, with 78.08% in favor, and the lowest level came from Arthur County, with 46.88% in favor.

The following table details the results by county:

1998 Nebraska Amendment 1
| County | Yes | | No | |
| County | # | % | # | % |
|---|---|---|---|---|
| Adams | 6,481 | 75.94% | 2,053 | 24.06% |
| Antelope | 1,708 | 67.40% | 826 | 32.60% |
| Arthur | 75 | 46.88% | 85 | 53.13% |
| Banner | 221 | 62.25% | 134 | 37.75% |
| Blaine | 142 | 51.82% | 132 | 48.18% |
| Boone | 1,419 | 67.54% | 682 | 32.46% |
| Box Butte | 2,420 | 66.34% | 1,228 | 33.66% |
| Boyd | 503 | 60.53% | 328 | 39.47% |
| Brown | 765 | 61.10% | 487 | 38.90% |
| Buffalo | 7,604 | 74.13% | 2,654 | 25.87% |
| Burt | 1,777 | 69.47% | 781 | 30.53% |
| Butler | 1,874 | 68.77% | 851 | 31.23% |
| Cass | 4,869 | 73.87% | 1,722 | 26.13% |
| Cedar | 2,036 | 69.09% | 911 | 30.91% |
| Chase | 881 | 64.35% | 488 | 35.65% |
| Cherry | 1,164 | 64.63% | 637 | 35.37% |
| Cheyenne | 1,890 | 66.13% | 968 | 33.87% |
| Clay | 1,419 | 63.86% | 803 | 36.14% |
| Colfax | 1,497 | 68.32% | 694 | 31.68% |
| Cuming | 1,986 | 68.77% | 902 | 31.23% |
| Custer | 2,204 | 65.03% | 1,185 | 34.97% |
| Dakota | 3,300 | 77.67% | 949 | 22.33% |
| Dawes | 1,586 | 66.67% | 793 | 33.33% |
| Dawson | 3,687 | 69.57% | 1,613 | 30.43% |
| Deuel | 424 | 57.84% | 309 | 42.16% |
| Dixon | 1,290 | 64.79% | 701 | 35.21% |
| Dodge | 6,811 | 73.24% | 2,489 | 26.76% |
| Douglas | 87,793 | 74.80% | 29,573 | 25.20% |
| Dundy | 470 | 63.95% | 265 | 36.05% |
| Fillmore | 1,520 | 69.60% | 664 | 30.40% |
| Franklin | 842 | 68.68% | 384 | 31.32% |
| Frontier | 605 | 63.82% | 343 | 36.18% |
| Furnas | 1,215 | 66.83% | 603 | 33.17% |
| Gage | 5,212 | 75.68% | 1,675 | 24.32% |
| Garden | 581 | 64.20% | 324 | 35.80% |
| Garfield | 357 | 56.58% | 274 | 43.42% |
| Gosper | 452 | 65.79% | 235 | 34.21% |
| Grant | 157 | 60.85% | 101 | 39.15% |
| Greeley | 579 | 64.98% | 312 | 35.02% |
| Hall | 9,593 | 74.23% | 3,331 | 25.77% |
| Hamilton | 2,036 | 65.80% | 1,058 | 34.20% |
| Harlan | 870 | 66.31% | 442 | 33.69% |
| Hayes | 234 | 54.93% | 192 | 45.07% |
| Hitchcock | 705 | 60.52% | 460 | 39.48% |
| Holt | 2,262 | 59.98% | 1,509 | 40.02% |
| Hooker | 190 | 60.13% | 126 | 39.87% |
| Howard | 1,463 | 69.50% | 642 | 30.50% |
| Jefferson | 1,834 | 70.05% | 784 | 29.95% |
| Johnson | 1,061 | 67.97% | 500 | 32.03% |
| Kearney | 1,490 | 71.46% | 595 | 28.54% |
| Keith | 1,922 | 69.29% | 852 | 30.71% |
| Keya Paha | 211 | 55.67% | 168 | 44.33% |
| Kimball | 924 | 65.02% | 497 | 34.98% |
| Knox | 1,948 | 66.83% | 967 | 33.17% |
| Lancaster | 54,377 | 78.08% | 15,266 | 21.92% |
| Lincoln | 7,314 | 71.60% | 2,901 | 28.40% |
| Logan | 157 | 51.82% | 146 | 48.18% |
| Loup | 109 | 53.69% | 94 | 46.31% |
| Madison | 6,238 | 73.55% | 2,243 | 26.45% |
| McPherson | 102 | 51.78% | 95 | 48.22% |
| Merrick | 1,593 | 67.87% | 754 | 32.13% |
| Morrill | 1,004 | 64.40% | 555 | 35.60% |
| Nance | 711 | 64.52% | 391 | 35.48% |
| Nemaha | 1,695 | 67.72% | 808 | 32.28% |
| Nuckolls | 1,165 | 69.43% | 513 | 30.57% |
| Otoe | 3,096 | 72.00% | 1,204 | 28.00% |
| Pawnee | 793 | 66.03% | 408 | 33.97% |
| Perkins | 743 | 63.07% | 435 | 36.93% |
| Phelps | 2,489 | 73.16% | 913 | 26.84% |
| Pierce | 1,445 | 71.53% | 575 | 28.47% |
| Platte | 5,574 | 70.42% | 2,341 | 29.58% |
| Polk | 1,170 | 64.57% | 642 | 35.43% |
| Red Willow | 2,336 | 66.42% | 1,181 | 33.58% |
| Richardson | 1,684 | 68.34% | 780 | 31.66% |
| Rock | 392 | 63.95% | 221 | 36.05% |
| Saline | 2,451 | 70.01% | 1,050 | 29.99% |
| Sarpy | 20,011 | 72.97% | 7,411 | 27.03% |
| Saunders | 4,390 | 70.81% | 1,810 | 29.19% |
| Scotts Bluff | 7,882 | 74.12% | 2,752 | 25.88% |
| Seward | 3,509 | 72.44% | 1,335 | 27.56% |
| Sheridan | 1,116 | 63.30% | 647 | 36.70% |
| Sherman | 817 | 67.52% | 393 | 32.48% |
| Sioux | 372 | 61.29% | 235 | 38.71% |
| Stanton | 1,230 | 72.06% | 477 | 27.94% |
| Thayer | 1,428 | 68.26% | 664 | 31.74% |
| Thomas | 181 | 63.51% | 104 | 36.49% |
| Thurston | 1,153 | 73.72% | 411 | 26.28% |
| Valley | 992 | 63.18% | 578 | 36.82% |
| Washington | 4,469 | 73.81% | 1,586 | 26.19% |
| Wayne | 1,825 | 71.01% | 745 | 28.99% |
| Webster | 922 | 68.96% | 415 | 31.04% |
| Wheeler | 198 | 59.82% | 133 | 40.18% |
| York | 2,980 | 67.15% | 1,458 | 32.85% |
