= Bill Harris (Nebraska politician) =

American politician

46th Mayor of Lincoln
- In office May 18, 1987 – May 20, 1991
- Preceded by: Roland Luedtke
- Succeeded by: Mike Johanns

Member of the Nebraska Legislature from the 27th district
- In office May 27, 1983 – May 13, 1987
- Appointed by: Bob Kerrey
- Preceded by: Steve Fowler
- Succeeded by: Stephanie Johanns

Personal details
- Born: Louis William Harris; August 8, 1939 Charlotte, North Carolina, U.S.
- Died: January 4, 2011 (aged 71) Lincoln, Nebraska, U.S.
- Party: Democratic
- Spouse: MarySue Harris
- Children: 2
- Education: University of Nebraska–Lincoln
- Occupation: Businessman

Louis William Harris (August 8, 1939 – January 4, 2011) was the 46th mayor of Lincoln, Nebraska, elected in May 1987. Harris previously served in the Nebraska Legislature from 1983 to 1987 after he was appointed by Nebraska Governor Bob Kerrey.

== Early life, education, and business career ==
Harris was born in Charlotte, North Carolina, and grew up in the southwestern Nebraska city of McCook. He graduated from McCook Senior High School in 1957, and from the University of Nebraska–Lincoln in 1961. During college in the early 1960s, he is reported to have served as a "houseboy" at the Governor's mansion of Governor Ralph G. Brooks, where he met President John F. Kennedy.

From 1969 to 1974, he taught economics and social studies at Lincoln East High School. Throughout the 1960s and 1970s, Harris also pursued a number of business ventures including Ag Land Realty Inc.; Harris Brothers Partnerships Inc., which managed farming and ranching activities in McCook; a clothing store chain called Lots to Love; Uncle Sam's Fireworks; and Harris Brothers Oil, a firm involved in oil leasing and exploration. He also served on the board of directors of the Nebraska Bank of Commerce and Nebraska Heavy Industries.

== Political career ==
=== Nebraska Legislature ===
In 1970, Harris campaigned for a seat in the Nebraska Legislature for the 38th district, which included the city of McCook. His attempt was unsuccessful, as he came in fourth in the primaries, failing to advance to the general election and losing to Richard Lewis who would eventually go on to win the seat.

In 1983, Harris was appointed to the Nebraska Legislature by Nebraska Governor Bob Kerrey to replace Steve Fowler, who had resigned so that Kerrey could appoint him as the head of the Policy Research Office. He was sworn in on May 27, 1983. Harris was elected in his own right to the seat in 1984. While serving in the Legislature, he chaired the Retirement System Committee and served as a member of the Education Committee, the Public Works Committee, and the Banking and Finance Committee. He resigned from the legislature on May 13, 1987, following his election as mayor.

=== Mayor of Lincoln, Nebraska ===
In 1987, Harris ran for mayor of Lincoln, Nebraska, challenging incumbent mayor Roland Luedtke. Harris was successful in his upset bid, and became Lincoln's mayor in May 1987 after resigning his seat in the Nebraska Legislature. While serving as Lincoln's mayor, Harris was responsible for spearheading construction projects and redevelopment, including annexing the bankrupt Highlands neighborhood and building a public golf course there, renovating Pershing Auditorium, and rejuvenating the warehouse district into the Haymarket business and entertainment district in downtown Lincoln. Harris also formed the Economic Development Department for the city of Lincoln.

In 1990, while mayor of Lincoln, Harris ran for Governor of Nebraska, but he came in fourth in the Democratic primary, losing to Ben Nelson, who went on to win the general election. In 1991, Harris ran for re-election as mayor of Lincoln but lost to then-Lincoln city councilman Mike Johanns.

== Later career ==
After serving as Lincoln's mayor, Harris served on the Nebraska Economic Development Commission from 1992 to 2004 after being appointed by Governor Ben Nelson.

== Electoral history ==
1987 Lincoln mayoral general election
Party	Candidate	Votes	%
Democratic	Bill Harris	22,369	59%
Republican	Roland Luedtke (incumbent)	15,496	41%

1991 Lincoln mayoral general election
Party	Candidate	Votes	%
Republican	Mike Johanns	19,909	54%
Democratic	Bill Harris (incumbent)	16,758	46%
