= Alma High School (Nebraska) =

Public high school in Alma, Arkansas, United States home of the Alma Airedales

Location
- 515 Jewell Street; Alma, Harlan County, Nebraska 68920; United States
- Coordinates: 35°28′33″N 94°13′08″W

Information
- Type: Public high school
- School district: Alma Public Schools
- NCES School ID: 310008000017
- Principal: Stephanie Brandyberry
- Teaching staff: 15.03 (on an FTE basis)
- Grades: 7–12
- Enrollment: 167 (2022–2023)
- Student to teacher ratio: 11.11
- Colors: Red and White
- Mascot: Cardinal
- Nickname: Cardinals
- Website: www.almacardinals.org

Alma High School is a public high school in Alma, Nebraska, United States. It is part of the Alma Public Schools district.

== Notable alumni ==
- DiAnna Schimek, politician
