= 2007 Lincoln, Nebraska mayoral election =

2007 Lincoln mayoral election
- May 14, 2007
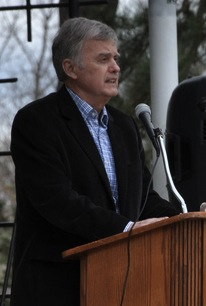

Candidate	Chris Beutler	Ken Svoboda
Popular vote	24,993	24,104
Percentage	50.64%	48.84%
Mayor before election
Coleen Seng
Democratic
Elected mayor
Chris Beutler
Democratic

The 2007 Lincoln, Nebraska mayoral election took place on May 1, 2007. Incumbent Mayor Coleen Seng announced that she would not seek a second term as Mayor. Former State Senator Chris Beutler, a Democrat, narrowly defeated Republican City Councilman Frank Svoboda to win his first term as Mayor.

== Primary ==
=== Candidates ===
- Chris Beutler, former State Senator
- Ken Svoboda, City Councilman
- Roger Yant Sr., businessman
- Mike Deal, van driver and business owner

=== Results ===
2007 Lincoln mayoral primary election results
Party	Candidate	Votes	%
Nonpartisan	Chris Beutler	13,286	47.54%
Nonpartisan	Ken Svoboda	9,722	34.79%
Nonpartisan	Roger Yant Sr.	3,985	14.26%
Nonpartisan	Mike Deal	835	2.99%
Write-in		119	0.43%
Total votes		27,947	100.00%

== General election ==
=== Results ===
2007 Lincoln mayoral general election results
Party	Candidate	Votes	%
Nonpartisan	Chris Beutler	24,993	50.64%
Nonpartisan	Ken Svoboda	24,104	48.84%
Write-in		254	0.52%
Total votes		49,351	100.00%
