= Steve Fowler =

American politician

Member of the Nebraska Legislature from the 27th district
- In office January 3, 1973 – May 27, 1983
- Preceded by: William Swanson
- Succeeded by: Bill Harris

Personal details
- Born: August 8, 1950 (age 75) Lincoln, Nebraska
- Party: Democratic
- Spouse: Vickie Horton
- Education: University of Nebraska–Lincoln (B.A.)
- Occupation: Policy analyst, campaign strategist

Steve Fowler (born August 8, 1950) is a Democratic politician and policy analyst who served as a member of the Nebraska Legislature from the 27th district from 1973 to 1983.

== Early life ==
Fowler was born in Lincoln, Nebraska, in 1950, and attended the University of Nebraska High School, graduating from Lincoln East High School in 1968. He attended the University of Nebraska–Lincoln, serving as student body president in 1971 and 1972.

== Nebraska Legislature ==
In 1972, Fowler ran against incumbent State Senator William Swanson in the Lincoln-based 27th district. In the nonpartisan primary, Fowler faced Peterson, former State Railway Commissioner Richard Larson, life insurance agent R. Stanley Sorensen, and activist Hubert Wisnieski. Swanson placed first in the primary, winning 33 percent of the vote, and advanced to the general election against Fowler, who placed second with 26 percent. The race between the two was expected to be close, and Fowler ultimately defeated Swanson with 51 percent of the vote, becoming the youngest person elected to the legislature in state history.

Fowler ran for re-election in 1976, and was challenged by attorney Don Stenberg and former Education Commissioner Cecil Stanley. Fowler placed first in the primary by a wide margin, winning 54 percent of the vote, and advanced to the general election against Stenberg, who won 23 percent of the vote and narrowly defeated Stanley for second place. Fowler defeated Stenberg, winning re-election 56–44 percent.

In 1980, Fowler ran for re-election to a third term, and was challenged by Jerry Sellentin, the director of human services at Bryan Memorial Hospital. Sellentin placed first in the primary over Fowler, winning 54 percent of the vote to Fowler's 46 percent. The race between Fowler and Sellentin was closely watched, and one of the most expensive in the state that year, with pro-life groups spending heavily against Fowler.

Fowler narrowly defeated Sellentin, winning 52 percent of the vote to Sellentin's 48 percent. Though Fowler initially declined to concede, and considered requesting a recount as the votes canvassed, but he ultimately declined to do so, and conceded defeat.

== Post-legislative career ==
On May 27, 1983, Fowler resigned from the legislature to serve as the director of the Policy Research Office in Governor Bob Kerrey's administration. He resigned from the Kerrey administration 1985 to serve as Omaha Mayor Mike Boyle's campaign manager in his successful re-election campaign.

Fowler and his wife moved to California, in 1985, where he worked as a campaign consultant and established FowlerHoffman LLC, a political consulting firm.
