= Coleen Seng =

American politician (1936–2025)

Coleen J. Seng

50th Mayor of Lincoln
- In office May 19, 2003 – May 19, 2007
- Preceded by: Don Wesely
- Succeeded by: Chris Beutler

Personal details
- Born: February 8, 1936 Council Bluffs, Iowa, U.S.
- Died: December 1, 2025 (aged 89)
- Party: Democratic
- Spouse: Darrel Seng (d. 1993)
- Education: Nebraska Wesleyan University

Coleen J. Seng (February 8, 1936 – December 1, 2025) was an American politician who served as the 50th mayor of Lincoln, Nebraska. A member of the Democratic Party, she served as mayor from May 19, 2003 to May 19, 2007. Previously, she had served on the Lincoln city council from 1987 to 2003. As mayor, she was known for seeking payment for $32,000 worth of security expenses incurred during the 2004 fundraising visit of Dick Cheney.

== Political career ==
Seng was elected in 2003, beating Republican city councilman Glenn Friendt. Seng received fewer votes than Friendt in the April primary but, due to a strong field campaign, rebounded and beat him in the May general election. During her term she blocked the construction of a Walmart in northeast Lincoln, focused on fixing the main streets, saw the passage of a public smoking ban over her veto, and proposed a ban on concealed weapons. She was a member of the Mayors Against Illegal Guns Coalition, a bipartisan group with a stated goal of "making the public safer by getting illegal guns off the streets." The coalition was founded by former Boston Mayor Thomas Menino and former New York City Mayor Michael Bloomberg. On July 24, 2006, the Lincoln City Council voted down a proposal submitted by Seng to ban concealed guns within the city limits of Lincoln.

On September 7, 2006, Seng announced that she would not run for re-election to a second term. State Senator Chris Beutler, who left the Nebraska Legislature because of term limits, won the 2007 mayoral election and succeeded Seng.

=== Dick Cheney incident ===
Seng sought payment for $32,000 worth of security expenses incurred during the June 17, 2004, fundraising visit of Dick Cheney in support of the candidacy of Republican Jeff Fortenberry for Nebraska's 1st congressional district. The city provided security through several street closings, extra law enforcement, and medical personnel. Cheney was born in Lincoln and lived there for the first several years of his life. During the visit, he surprised the current resident of the home he grew up in by stopping by for about an hour, which was part of the increased security cost of his visit.

Republicans argued that Seng, a Democrat, was merely trying to stir up political turmoil, and that the mayor of Omaha sought no such reimbursement following a visit from President George W. Bush in 2003. Fortenberry, however, reimbursed the federal government for use of Air Force Two during the fundraising stop, pointing to a possible precedent for such repayment.

== Death ==
Seng died on December 1, 2025, at the age of 89.
