= DiAnna Schimek =

American politician (born 1940)

Member of the Nebraska Legislature from the 27 district
- In office 1989–2009
- Preceded by: Stephanie Johanns
- Succeeded by: Colby Coash

Personal details
- Born: March 21, 1940 (age 86) Holdrege, Nebraska, U.S.
- Party: Democratic
- Education: Kearney State College

DiAnna Schimek (born March 21, 1940) is a politician from Nebraska who has served in the Nebraska Legislature and the Lincoln City Council.

== Personal life ==
She was born on March 21, 1940, in Holdrege, Nebraska, and graduated from Alma High School in 1958. She attended Colorado Women's College and the University of Nebraska and graduated from Kearney State College in 1963. She also did some graduate work at both the University of Nebraska and Kearney State College. She is a past member of boards of directors for the First Security National Bank, Women in Community Service Home for Girls, and Nebraska Repertory Theatre. She won the YWCA Tribute to Women Award in 1992. Her husband is named Herbert, and they have two children, Samuel Wolfgang and Saul William.

== Early political activity ==
Schimek was a member of the Democratic National Committee from 1976 to 1988, and unsuccessfully ran for state treasurer in 1986.

== State Legislature ==
Schimek was elected in 1988 to represent the 27th Nebraska legislative district and reelected in 1992, 1996, 2000, and 2004. In 2007, she sat on the Business and Labor and Urban Affairs committees as well as the Committee on Committees and chairs the Government, Military and Veterans' Affairs.

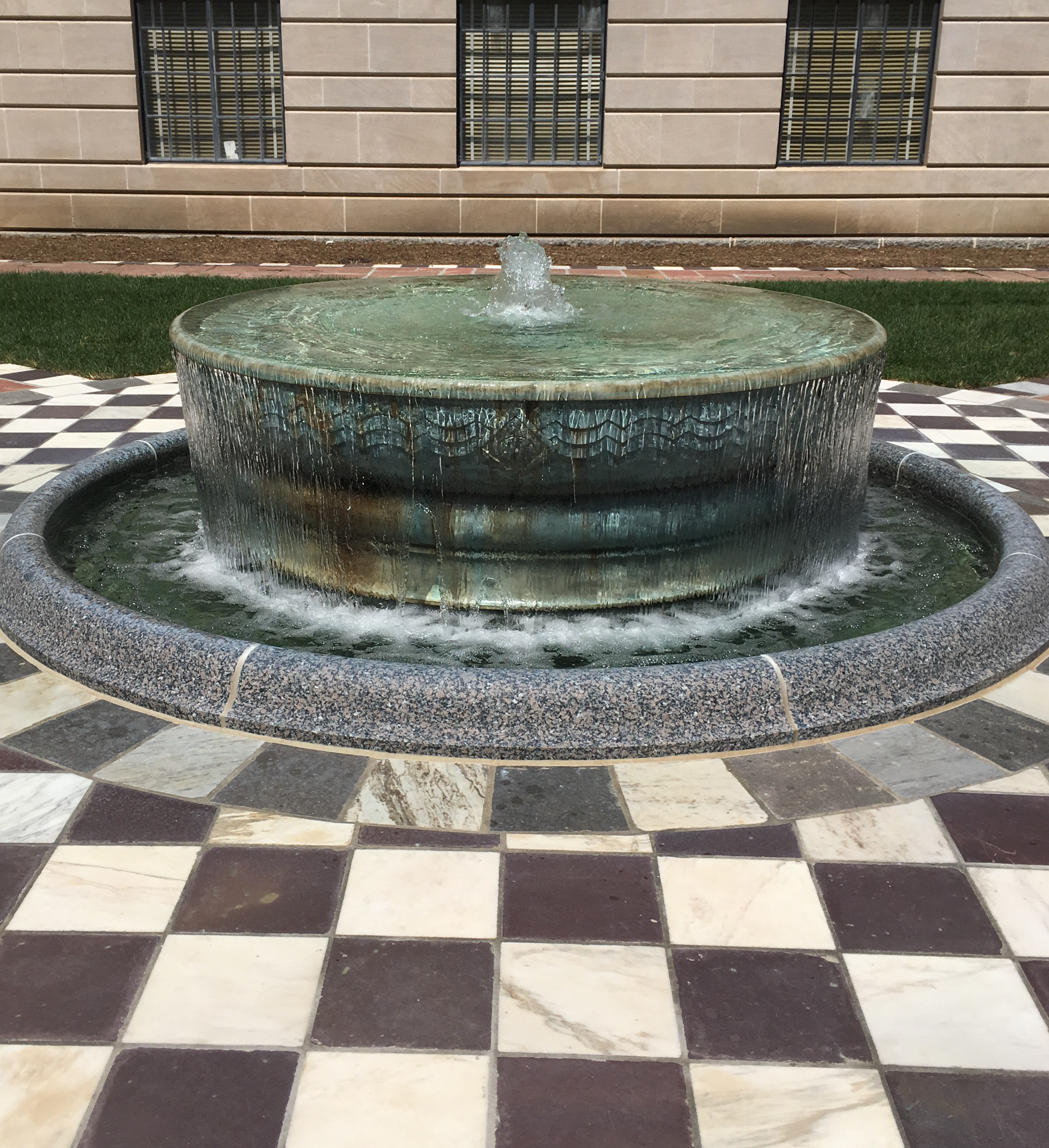
Schimek secured funding to build fountains at the Nebraska Capitol

Schimek was largely responsible for the enactment of Nebraska's method of apportioning electoral votes in presidential elections by congressional district (see Electoral College (United States): Congressional District Method). She has described the system as "one that I think will energize the electorate and perhaps even bring more candidates to Nebraska, although certainly that wasn't the overall selling point that I used."

Schimek introduced legislation in 2005 giving Nebraskans with felony convictions the right to vote two years after serving their sentences. Schimek co-sponsored legislation granting in-state University of Nebraska tuition to children of undocumented immigrants who graduate from Nebraska's high schools.

In 2007 Schimek unsuccessfully ran for the position of speaker of the Legislature, a position won by Mike Flood. She left the legislature in 2008.

== Lincoln City Council ==
In September 2011, Schimek was appointed to replace Jane Snyder, who resigned for health reasons, on the Lincoln City Council. She took her seat on October 10, 2011 to represent one of the at-large seats. She did not seek reelection to the council in 2013.

Party political offices
Preceded by Orval A. Keyes	Democratic nominee for Nebraska State Treasurer; 1986	Succeeded by Dawn Rockey
