= Crete Carrier Corporation =

American trucking company

- Type: Private
- Industry: Freight transport
- Founded: 1966; 60 years ago in Crete, Nebraska, U.S.
- Founder: Ken Norton
- Headquarters: Lincoln, Nebraska, U.S.
- Divisions: Crete Carrier; Shaffer Trucking; Hunt Transportation
- Website: cretecarrier.com

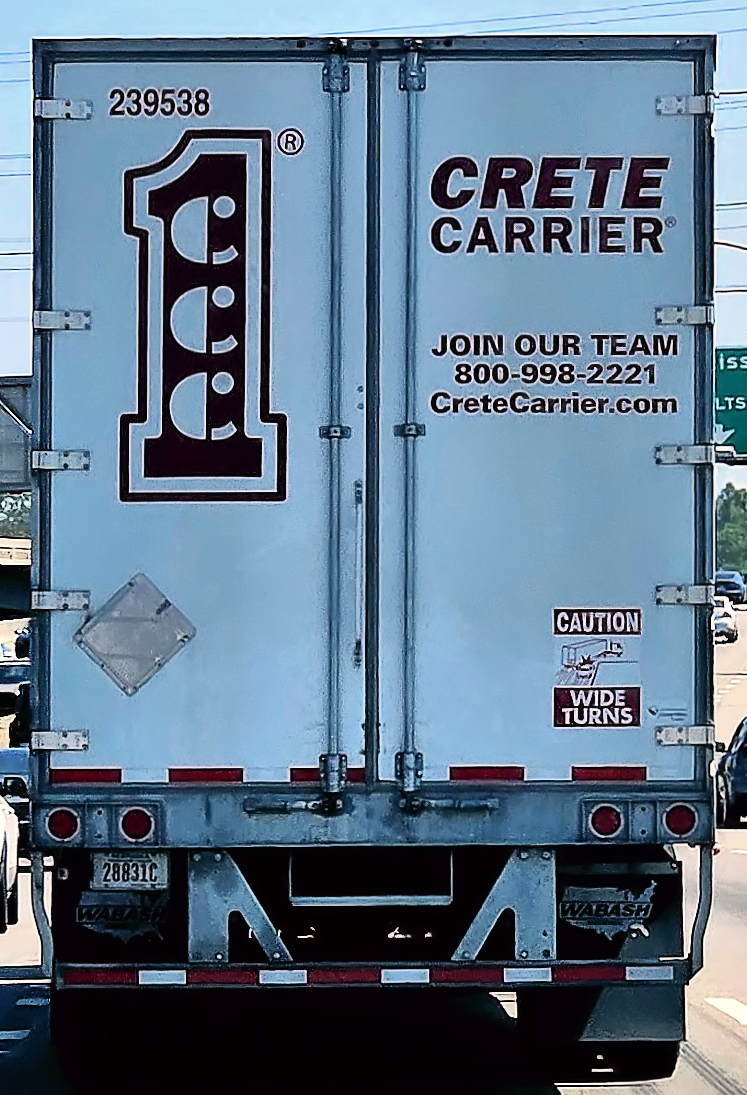
Rear view of a Crete Carrier semi-trailer in 2023

Crete Carrier Corporation is an American trucking company headquartered in Lincoln, Nebraska. The company comprises three divisions—Crete Carrier, Shaffer Trucking, and Hunt Transportation—and offers freight transport services across the contiguous United States.

== History ==
Crete Carrier was founded by Ken Norton in 1966 in Crete, Nebraska. The company served as a contract carrier in its early years, shipping goods for customers such as Alpo pet food.

In 1971, Crete Carrier was acquired by Duane Acklie, the company's attorney, and his wife Phyllis, who borrowed $8,000 to complete the purchase. The company relocated its headquarters to Lincoln, Nebraska, in 1973.

In 1974, the company acquired Shaffer Trucking, a refrigerated carrier based in New Kingstown, Pennsylvania. In 1979, the company acquired another refrigerated carrier, Sunflower Carriers, based in York, Nebraska.

In 1999, the company acquired Hunt Transportation (no relation to J. B. Hunt), a trucking company based in Omaha, Nebraska, that focused on heavy machinery transport.

By 2005, Crete Carrier Corporation employed more than 3,000 drivers and maintained a fleet of more than 3,400 tractors and 8,200 trailers.

In 2012, Crete Carrier Corporation launched five new trucks decorated to honor the U.S. Armed Forces as its Patriot Fleet.

== Operations ==
Crete Carrier Corporation is a privately held company that provides freight transport services across the contiguous United States. The company comprises three divisions: Crete Carrier, providing dry van services; Shaffer Trucking, providing refrigerated services; and Hunt Transportation, providing flatbed services. As of 2025, the company maintains a fleet of more than 5,000 tractors and 13,000 trailers.
