= Mike Johanns =

American politician (born 1950)

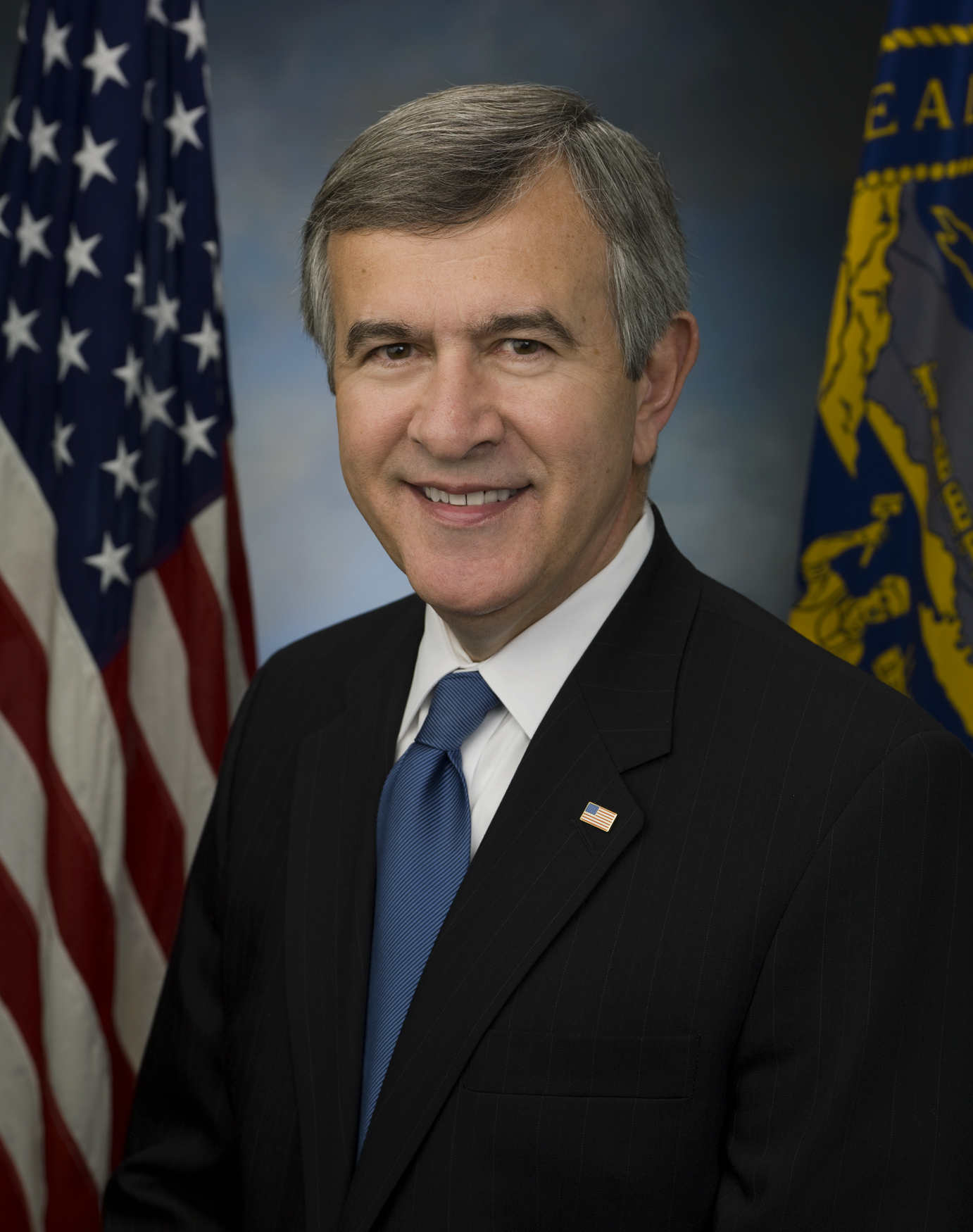
- Official portrait, 2009

United States Senator from Nebraska
- In office January 3, 2009 – January 3, 2015
- Preceded by: Chuck Hagel
- Succeeded by: Ben Sasse

28th United States Secretary of Agriculture
- In office January 21, 2005 – September 20, 2007
- President: George W. Bush
- Preceded by: Ann Veneman
- Succeeded by: Ed Schafer

38th Governor of Nebraska
- In office January 7, 1999 – January 20, 2005
- Lieutenant: David Maurstad; Dave Heineman
- Preceded by: Ben Nelson
- Succeeded by: Dave Heineman

47th Mayor of Lincoln
- In office May 20, 1991 – November 30, 1998
- Preceded by: Bill Harris
- Succeeded by: Dale Young

Personal details
- Born: Michael Owen Johanns; June 18, 1950 (age 76) Osage, Iowa, U.S.
- Party: Democratic (before 1988); Republican (1988–present)
- Spouses: Connie Johanns (m. 1972; div. 1985); Stephanie Armitage (m. 1986)
- Children: 2
- Education: Saint Mary's University of Minnesota (BA); Creighton University (JD)
- Johanns's voice Johanns questioning Joseph Glauber, chief economist of the U.S. Agriculture Department, at a hearing on the state of the U.S. livestock industry. Recorded June 28, 2011

Michael Owen Johanns (/ˈdʒoʊhæns/ JOH-hanss; born June 18, 1950) is an American attorney and politician who served as a United States senator from Nebraska from 2009 to 2015. He served as the 38th governor of Nebraska from 1999 until 2005, and was chair of the Midwestern Governors Association in 2002. In 2005, he was appointed by President George W. Bush to serve as the secretary of agriculture, where he served from 2005 to 2007, becoming the fourth Nebraskan to hold that position.

Born in Osage, Iowa, Johanns is a graduate of Saint Mary's University of Minnesota and Creighton University School of Law. He began his career as an attorney working in private practice before clerking for the Nebraska Supreme Court. Elected to the Lancaster County Board as a Democrat in 1983, Johanns served there until 1987, and was elected to the Lincoln City Council in 1988. He was elected the 47th mayor of Lincoln in 1991 and reelected in 1995.

In Nebraska's 1998 gubernatorial election, Johanns defeated Democratic political aide Bill Hoppner, and in 2002 he was reelected over insurance executive Stormy Dean. In 2008, Johanns ran for the Republican nomination to replace retiring U.S. Senator Chuck Hagel. He won the primary, defeating businessman Pat Flynn, and the general election, defeating Democratic challenger Scott Kleeb. He was sworn in on January 3, 2009; along with Jim Risch of Idaho, he became only one of two new Republican senators sworn into the 111th United States Congress. On February 18, 2013, Johanns announced that he would not run for reelection to a second term in 2014, and was succeeded by fellow Republican Ben Sasse.

== Early life, education and legal career ==
Johanns was born in Osage, Iowa, the son of Adeline Lucy (née Royek) and John Robert Johanns. His father was of German and some Luxembourgish ancestry, and his maternal grandparents immigrated from Poland. He grew up living and working on his family's farm.

He graduated from Osage Community High School in 1968 and went on to study at Saint Mary's University of Minnesota in Winona, where he received his Bachelor of Arts in Communications in 1971. Johanns earned his Juris Doctor from Creighton University School of Law, and joined the Nebraska State Bar Association in 1974.

After his graduation, he clerked for Nebraska Supreme Court Justice Hale McCown from 1974 to 1975, before practicing law for Cronin and Hannon in O'Neill, Nebraska, from 1975 to 1976. He was a partner at Nelson, Johanns, Morris, Holdeman, and Titus, a law firm he founded in Lincoln in 1976, where he practiced until 1991.

== Early political career ==
Johanns served on the Lancaster County Board from 1983 to 1987 as a Democrat. In 1988, he was elected as a Republican to the Lincoln City Council, where he served from 1989 to 1991. On May 7, 1991, he was elected the 47th mayor of Lincoln, defeating incumbent mayor Bill Harris with 54% of the vote. He took office as mayor on May 20, 1991. In 1995, Johanns won reelection with no opposition, becoming the first mayor of Lincoln to do so since the 1950s. After being elected governor of Nebraska, he was succeeded as mayor by Dale Young, who was appointed by the Lincoln City Council.

== Governor of Nebraska ==
=== Elections ===
==== 1998 ====
Johanns began campaigning early in Nebraska's 1998 gubernatorial election, holding his first campaign event in October 1995. The early start led to a slow, steady build-up in name recognition and organizational support, and an advantage of small donors over his Republican opponents, Nebraska State Auditor John Breslow and U.S. Representative Jon Lynn Christensen. Johanns visited all of Nebraska's 93 counties, traveling over 100,000 miles. Christensen, a two-term representative who promised not to serve more than three terms in the House, was seen as a surprise candidate in the gubernatorial election, as he had to give up his seat on the powerful House Ways and Means Committee. Christensen (who saw backing from the Christian right), and Breslow ran their campaigns on a staunch social conservative message and were seen as trying to "outconservative" and outdistance one another, while Johanns was seen as an attractive candidate for moderate voters.

Christensen was seen as the early frontrunner, though his lead fell dramatically in the final weeks after he made public comments that he signed an affidavit after he and his first wife divorced, saying that her adultery broke up their marriage. He also saw backlash from comments he made about his second wife (Tara Dawn Holland, Miss America 1997), that he got her to swear that she was a virgin who was "saving herself for marriage." His campaign also vigorously attacked Johanns in a flier for allowing "obscene and racist" broadcasts to air on Lincoln's public access cable channel. The broadcasts showed a man urinating in public; though Johanns tried to stop the program, the airing was protected by a federal lawsuit. The flier was condemned by Republican members of Nebraska's congressional delegation, with then-Senator Chuck Hagel saying that "Nobody in the Republican Party of Nebraska can be proud of Jon Christensen's conduct. I hope the people of the state will get out and vote and register their feelings on the conduct of this campaign." Hagel also added that his tactics "embarrassed Nebraska."

Though the race was seen as a "dead heat" the day before the primary, Johanns won with 40% of the vote, to Breslow's 29% and Christensen's 28%. The primary was seen as one of the most expensive in Nebraska history, with Breslow spending $3.8 million ($2.5 million of his own money), Christensen spending $1.8 million and Johanns spending $1.7 million.

Incumbent Ben Nelson, a popular Democrat in the staunchly red state, was term-limited after serving two terms as governor, leaving the Democratic field open. Bill Hoppner won the Democratic nomination, defeating lawyer and former member of the Nebraska Legislature Jim McFarland. Hoppner, an attorney who previously served as the chief of staff to senators J. James Exon and Bob Kerrey, had never won an election before; he had run for governor and was defeated by Nelson in the 1990 primary.

On November 3, 1998, Johanns and his running mate, David I. Maurstad, defeated Hoppner and his running mate, Pam Bataillon, in the general election, by a margin of 54% to 46%.

==== 2002 ====
Johanns won reelection in 2002 by a landslide, defeating Democrat Stormy Dean by a margin of 69% to 27%, thus becoming the first Republican governor of Nebraska to be reelected since Victor Anderson in 1956.

=== Tenure ===
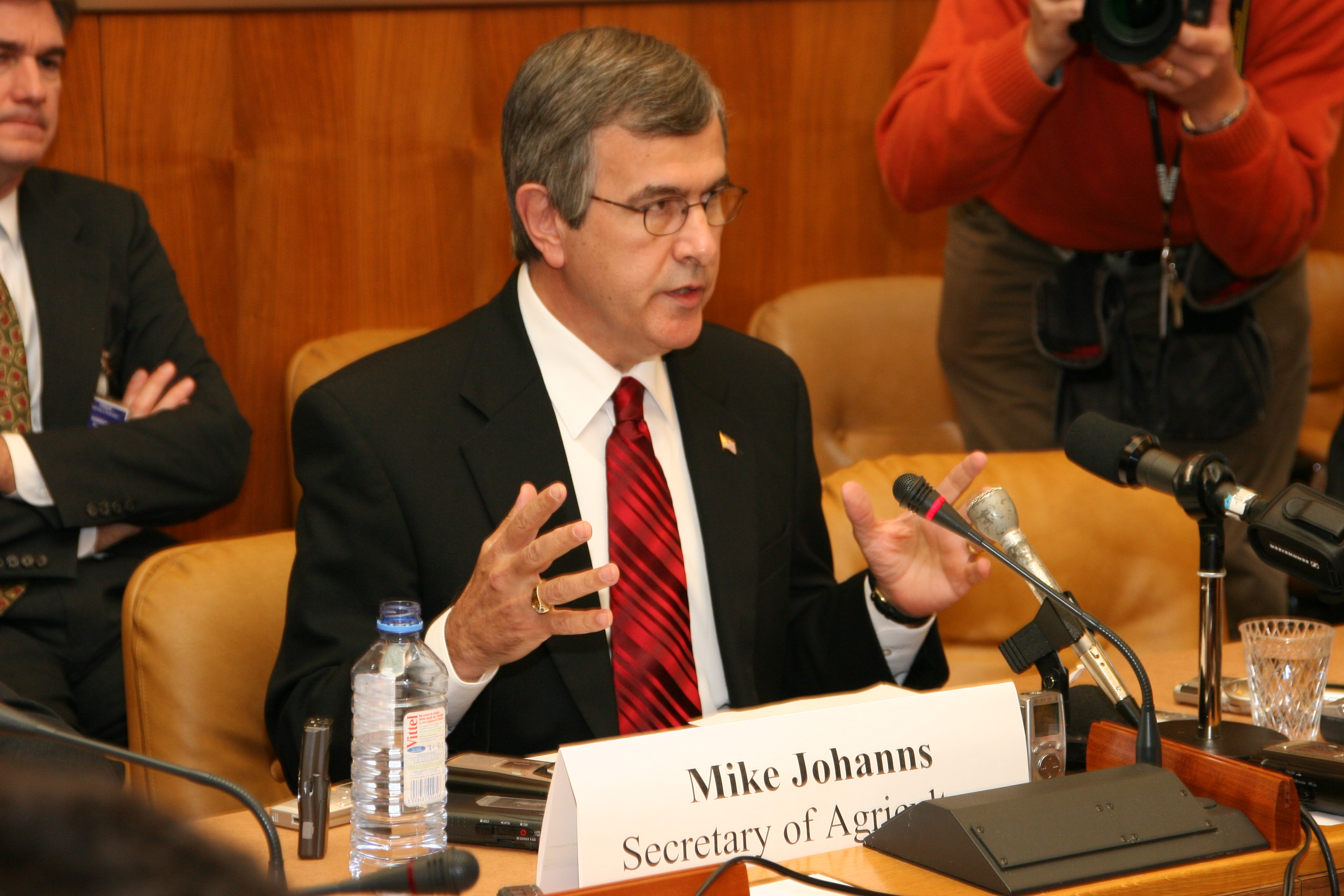
Johanns speaks at a hearing, 2005

During his first term, Johanns focused on direct property tax relief. He succeeded in enacting a total of $85 million in such relief.

Johanns was a supporter of Initiative 413, amending Nebraska's constitution to limit state government spending, and adjusting tax revenue increases to the rate of inflation. In 2002 Johanns signed legislation raising the state's cigarette tax by 50 cents per pack; from 34 to 84 cents. Johanns proposed another 20 cents increase in cigarette taxes, saying that "I don't think you're going to get much debate that medical costs are higher when you smoke. Cigarette and tobacco use may be a choice, but every one of us pays for its use, either with our health or our pocketbooks, or both."

Johanns led agriculture trade missions to Japan, China, Taiwan, Australia, South Korea and Brazil. He signed legislation increasing state gasoline taxes by 1.25 cents for ethanol incentive funding, raising $1.5 million annually for Nebraska's Ethanol Production Incentive Cash Fund. Johanns served as the chairman of Governors' Ethanol Coalition in 2001.

Johanns was known for his strong stance on vetoing bills. In 1999 Johanns vetoed 26 bills in only five days, more than any previous governor in Nebraska history. In 2003 Johanns vetoed the entire $5.4 billion two-year Nebraska state budget. He said that he "could not accept a budget that raised taxes to grow government at a time when the state must cut spending," and called for a nearly 10% cut in every state government program. Johanns vetoed legislation increasing the pay of members of the Nebraska Legislature, though the veto was overridden by the legislature; he also vetoed legislation authorizing teacher salary increases.

During the 1999 legislative session, the Nebraska Legislature passed a moratorium of executions in a 27 to 21 vote, becoming the first state in the nation to send such a proposal to the governor's desk. The bill set bans on all executions for two years, while a study to see if the death penalty was being applied fairly in the state took place. Though the bill prevented executions from taking place, it did not exempt the sentencing of the death penalty in new cases. Johanns, who is a proponent of the capital punishment, vetoed the bill a week after its passage; calling the bill "poor public policy" that would "at a minimum be utilized to advance further unnecessary criminal appeals by those currently sentenced to death row in Nebraska." The veto of the bill was condemned by the American Civil Liberties Union, the American Bar Association and Pope John Paul II.

In 1999, Johanns saw criticism from the groups People For the American Way and the American Civil Liberties Union for signing a proclamation declaring May 22, "March for Jesus Day," in honor of a fundamentalist Christian group in Nebraska. Critiques said that Johanns was "violating the neutrality of religions that is required of his office. He was endorsing Christianity over all other religions, sending an impermissible message to Nebraskans of other faiths or of no faith that their beliefs are disfavored by the Government." Johanns also endorsed "Back to the Bible Day," though he refused to issue a proclamation for Earth Religion Awareness Day, a day requested by Wicca groups. Johanns said that "I wouldn't hesitate to sign a proclamation for the Jewish faith, Hinduism, whatever. So long as it doesn't require me to sign something I personally don't agree with." Johanns previously refused to sign a proclamation for LGBT Pride in 1997, citing his Christianity.

Johanns twice served as the chair of the National Governors Association's Committee on Economic Development and Commerce from 2000 to 2001 and from 2002 to 2003. In July 2001, he was unanimously approved by the Board of Directors of the Export-Import Bank of the United States to serve on the banks Advisory Committee, and in 2003 served as the chairman of the Governor's Biotechnology Partnership.

Johanns succeeded Iowa Governor Tom Vilsack as chair of the Midwestern Governors Association in 2002.

== United States Secretary of Agriculture ==
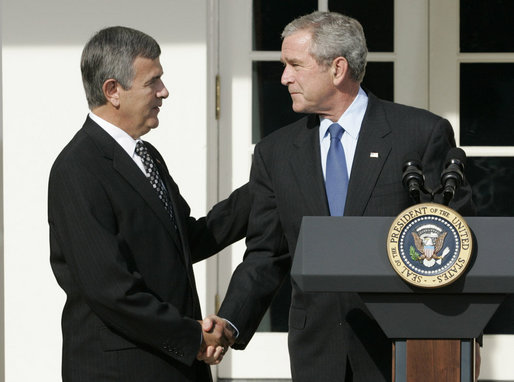
Johanns shakes hands with President George W. Bush, 2007

On December 2, 2004, Johanns was nominated by President George W. Bush to replace outgoing Secretary of Agriculture Ann Veneman. As a result, he scrapped plans to run against Democratic U.S. Senator Ben Nelson (his predecessor as governor) in the 2006 election. In his announcement nominating Johanns as agriculture secretary, President Bush explained that he chose him to replace Veneman for his support of ethanol and biodiesel and for his knowledge in foreign trade; calling him "a man of action and of complete integrity." Johanns was confirmed in a voice vote by the Senate on January 20, 2005, hours after Bush's second inauguration. He tendered his resignation as Governor of Nebraska on that day, and was sworn in the next day.

The Department of Agriculture under Johanns received criticism for being too slow to perform additional tests on cows suspected of having mad cow disease.

== U.S. Senate ==
=== 2008 election ===
On September 20, 2007, Johanns resigned as the Secretary of Agriculture and announced on October 10, 2007 that he would run for the United States Senate seat vacated by Senator Chuck Hagel. On November 4, 2008, he was elected to the United States Senate, defeating Democratic nominee Scott Kleeb in the general election.

=== Tenure ===
Johanns' time in the Senate was low-key: he never appeared on one of the Sunday morning talk shows. He voted against the Patient Protection and Affordable Care Act and the Dodd–Frank Wall Street Reform and Consumer Protection Act, and opposed cap-and-trade legislation. He was a member of the "Gang of Eight" that tried to negotiate a federal deficit reduction deal in 2011 and was pivotal in re-routing the proposed route of the Keystone Pipeline.

Johanns received an award from the National Multiple Sclerosis Society for his work to support funding for autoimmune disease research.

=== Committee assignments ===
- Committee on Agriculture, Nutrition and Forestry
  - Subcommittee on Energy, Science and Technology
  - Subcommittee on Domestic and Foreign Marketing, Inspection, and Plant and Animal Health (Ranking Member)
  - Subcommittee on Production, Income Protection and Price Support
- Committee on Banking, Housing, and Urban Affairs
  - Subcommittee on Financial Institutions
  - Subcommittee on Housing, Transportation, and Community Development
  - Subcommittee on Securities, Insurance, and Investment, Ranking Member
- Committee on Commerce, Science and Transportation
  - Subcommittee on Aviation Operations, Safety, and Security
  - Subcommittee on Communications, Technology, and the Internet
  - Subcommittee on Competitiveness, Innovation, and Export Promotion
  - Subcommittee on Science and Space
  - Subcommittee on Surface Transportation and Merchant Marine Infrastructure, Safety, and Security
- Committee on Veterans' Affairs
- Committee on Indian Affairs
- Impeachment Trial Committee on the Articles against Judge G. Thomas Porteous, Jr.

=== Caucus memberships ===
- International Conservation Caucus
- Parkinson's Disease Caucus (co-chair)
- Sportsmen's Caucus

== Millennium Challenge Corporation ==
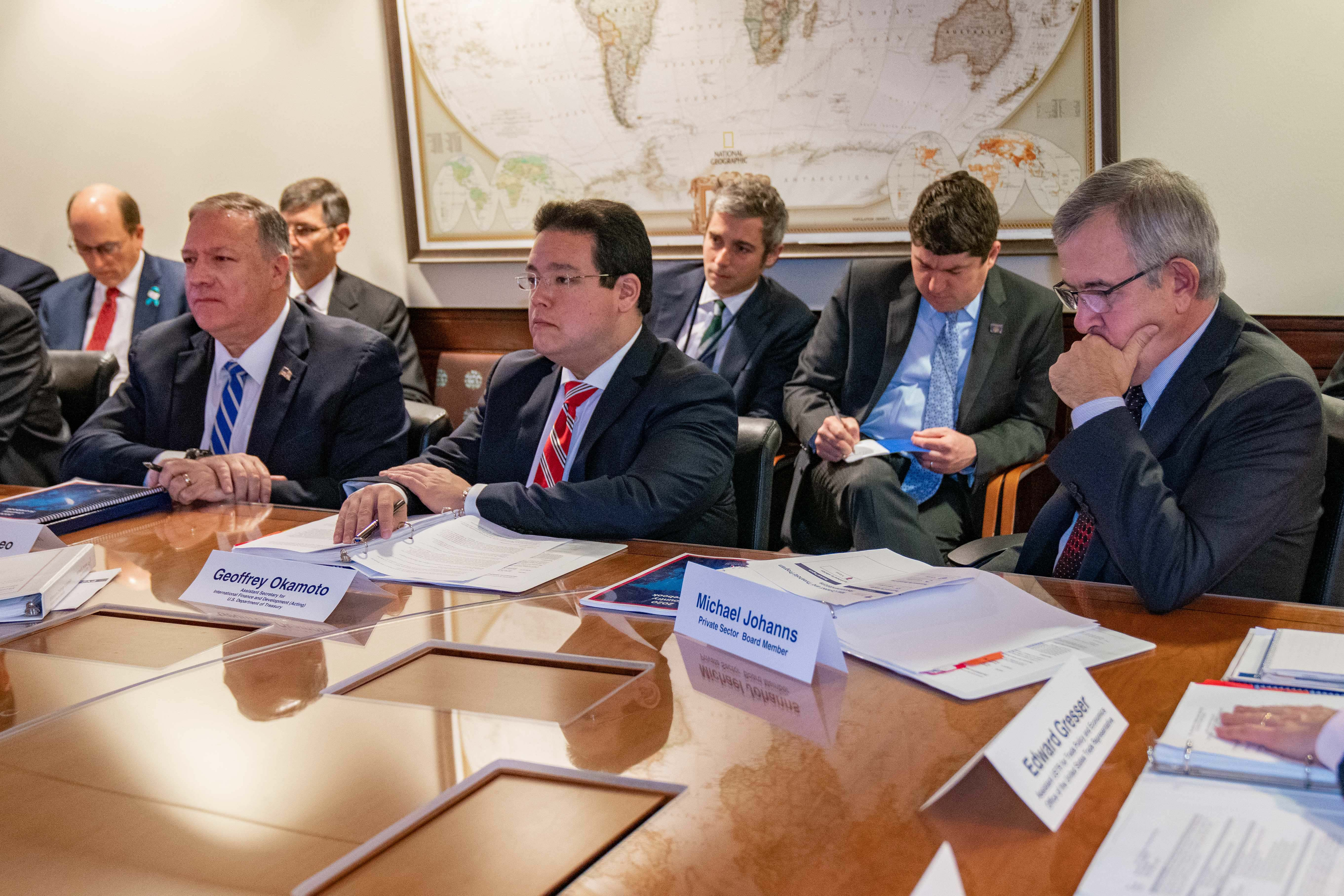
Johanns (right) at a board meeting of the Millennium Challenge Corporation, 2019

In December 2015, President Barack Obama nominated Johanns to be a member of the board of directors of the Millennium Challenge Corporation. This nomination was confirmed by a voice vote of the U.S. Senate in February 2016. In March 2019, President Donald Trump nominated him for a second term on the board.

== Personal life ==
Johanns married his first wife, Connie Johanns, in 1972. They had two children together: a son, Justin and a daughter, Michaela. He also has five grandchildren. Johanns and his wife divorced in 1985, and in 1986 he married Stephanie Armitage, a former Lancaster County Commissioner and Nebraska state senator.

Political offices
Preceded by Bill Harris	Mayor of Lincoln; 1991–1999	Succeeded by Dale Young
Preceded by Ben Nelson	Governor of Nebraska; 1999–2005	Succeeded by Dave Heineman
Preceded by Ann Veneman	United States Secretary of Agriculture; 2005–2007	Succeeded by Ed Schafer
Party political offices
Preceded by Gene Spence	Republican nominee for Governor of Nebraska; 1998, 2002	Succeeded by Dave Heineman
Preceded by Chuck Hagel	Republican nominee for U.S. Senator from Nebraska (Class 2); 2008	Succeeded by Ben Sasse
U.S. Senate
Preceded by Chuck Hagel	U.S. Senator (Class 2) from Nebraska; 2009–2015; Served alongside: Ben Nelson, Deb Fischer	Succeeded by Ben Sasse
U.S. order of precedence (ceremonial)
Preceded by Margaret Spellings as Former U.S. Cabinet Member	Order of precedence of the United States as Former U.S. Cabinet Member	Succeeded by Mike Leavitt as Former U.S. Cabinet Member
