= Dale Young (politician) =

American politician

48th Mayor of Lincoln
- In office November 30, 1998 – May 17, 1999
- Preceded by: Mike Johanns
- Succeeded by: Don Wesely

Personal details
- Born: March 13, 1928 Palmyra, Nebraska
- Died: March 1, 2022 (aged 93) Lincoln, Nebraska
- Party: Republican
- Education: University of Nebraska
- Occupation: Banker

Dale L. Young (March 13, 1928 – March 1, 2022) was the 48th mayor of Lincoln, Nebraska, after being appointed to that position by the Lincoln City Council to fill the vacancy of mayor Mike Johanns who had resigned in order to become Governor of Nebraska. Young previously served on the Lincoln City Council from 1991 to 1998.

Young was born in Palmyra, Nebraska, and graduated from Palmyra High School. He then went on to pursue a degree in business administration from the University of Nebraska. Young was a veteran who served during World War II and the Korean War. He spent most of his career as a banking executive. He retired as the senior executive vice president and cashier of FirsTier Bank in 1991.

Young was elected to the Lincoln City Council in May 1991 representing the third district. He served on the Lincoln City Council until 1998, when he was appointed mayor of Lincoln to replace Mike Johanns, who had resigned to become Governor of Nebraska. Young served as mayor for almost six months until May 1999 when Don Wesely was elected.

In addition to his service on the city council and as mayor of Lincoln, Young also served at various times as the president of the Lincoln Chamber of Commerce, president of the Country Club of Lincoln, member of the executive committee of the Nebraska Bankers Association, member of the board of Woodmen Accident & Life Company, member of the board of Bryan Memorial Hospital, treasurer of the Nebraska Republican Party, alumni advisor and treasurer of Theta Xi fraternity, member of the Lincoln Library Board of Trustees, president of the Lincoln Symphony Orchestra, trustee of the Nebraska State Historical Society, founder and treasurer of the Lincoln Children's Zoo Foundation, and many other community and civic organizations.
