= Don Wesely =

American politician (1954–2025)

49th Mayor of Lincoln
- In office May 17, 1999 – May 19, 2003
- Preceded by: Dale Young
- Succeeded by: Coleen Seng

Member of the Nebraska Legislature from the 26th district
- In office January 3, 1979 – January 6, 1999
- Preceded by: L. K. Emry
- Succeeded by: Marian Price

Personal details
- Born: March 30, 1954 David City, Nebraska, U.S.
- Died: March 18, 2025 (aged 70)
- Party: Democratic
- Education: University of Nebraska–Lincoln

Donald Raymond Wesely (March 30, 1954 – March 18, 2025) was an American politician who served as the 49th mayor of Lincoln, Nebraska, having previously sat in the Nebraska Legislature from 1979 to 1999.

== Background ==
Wesely was born March 30, 1954, in David City, Nebraska. He graduated from Lincoln Northeast High School, then went on to receive his B.A. Degree from the University of Nebraska–Lincoln in 1977 and attended graduate school at UNL. Wesely had three children. Wesely died at his home in Lincoln on March 18, 2025, at the age of 70.

== Political career ==
Wesely was first elected to the Nebraska Legislature in 1978. He was only twenty-four when elected and was a graduate student at the University of Nebraska–Lincoln. He was the third-youngest person ever to serve in that body. Wesely was a member of the Democratic Party. During his tenure, more than 300 legislative initiatives sponsored or co-sponsored by Wesely were successfully enacted into state law. His committee work included 14 years as Chairman of the Health and Human Services Committee. When he retired after 20 years in the legislature, Wesely was the eighth longest serving state senator in Nebraska history. He was only forty-four years-old upon his retirement from the legislature.

In 1999, Wesely was elected mayor of Lincoln, Nebraska, with 56% of the vote. He served only one term as Mayor. Following his departure from the mayor's office, he became a lobbyist for the state legislature.

Wesely was a delegate to the 1996 Democratic National Convention and the 2000 Democratic National Convention.
