= List of mayors of Lincoln, Nebraska =

Government official in the United States

Mayor of Lincoln, Nebraska
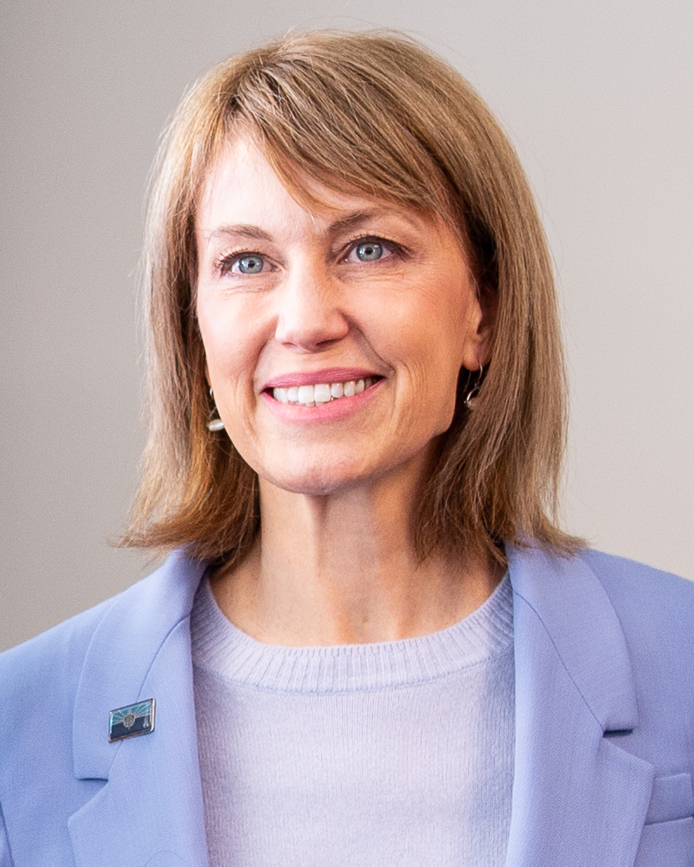
- Incumbent; Leirion Gaylor Baird since May 20, 2019
- Type: Mayor
- Term length: Four years
- Formation: 1871
- First holder: Humphrey D. Gilbert (de facto); William F. Chapin (official)
- Website: https://www.lincoln.ne.gov/City/Mayor

The mayor of Lincoln, Nebraska is the head of the government of Lincoln, a city located in the State of Nebraska in the United States. The mayor is vested with the executive and administrative power of the city of Lincoln and is the ceremonial head of its government.

The Lincoln mayor is elected every four years on the first Tuesday in May of every other odd-numbered year. The mayor, along with newly elected city council members, takes office on the second Monday after the first Tuesday in May (election day). Due to an amendment of the Lincoln City Charter passed by the voters in November 2018, the Lincoln mayor is limited to serve a maximum of three consecutive terms in office. To date, Chris Beutler is Lincoln's longest serving mayor, having held the office for 12 years. As happened last in 1998, if a vacancy occurs in the mayoral office, the vacancy is filled by majority vote of the Lincoln City Council.

Among the powers and responsibilities of the mayor as specified by the Lincoln City Charter are these: to supervise all city departments and agencies, to enforce the city charter and ordinances, to submit an annual city budget to the city council and approve large purchases, to promote the commercial and industrial growth of the city, and to appoint the heads of all city departments with the approval of the city council and appoint other city officers, employees, and members of boards and commissions.

== History ==
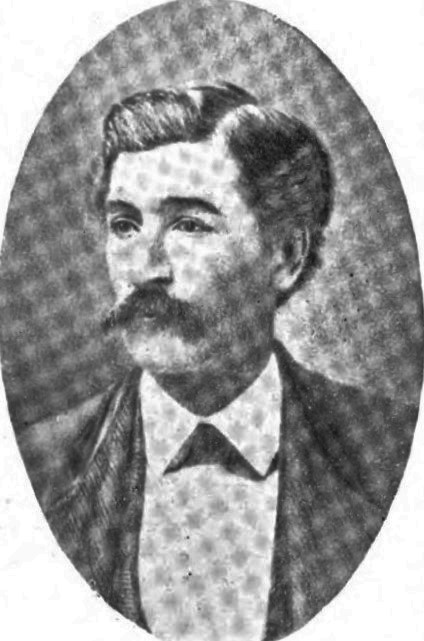
William F. Chapin, first elected mayor of Lincoln

Lincoln, Nebraska, was officially incorporated as a town on April 7, 1869, by the commissioners of Lancaster County. Interim trustees were chosen for its board of trustees, which functioned as its city council. Permanent trustees were then officially elected by the citizens of Lincoln on May 3, 1869. A chairman was chosen by the trustees, and although there was no official title of "mayor" of Lincoln at this time, the chairman of the board of trustees was effectively the mayor of Lincoln. Lincoln's first chairman of the board of trustees was Humphrey D. Gilbert, elected in 1869, and Lincoln's second chairman of the board of trustees was Charles H. Gere, elected in 1870.

Lincoln was later incorporated as a city of the second class by the Legislature of Nebraska on March 18, 1871, which allowed its citizens to directly elect a mayor. The first mayor elected by the citizens of Lincoln was William F. Chapin, a lawyer and former Speaker of the Nebraska House of Representatives, who was elected on April 4, 1871. Lincoln continued to elect mayors in April of every year to one-year terms until 1883, when the Nebraska Legislature passed a bill stipulating that the mayors of all second-class cities would be elected to two-year terms on the first Tuesday in April. Thus, from 1883 to 1911, the mayor was elected directly by the citizens of Lincoln for a term of two years. In 1912, the Nebraska Legislature amended the state's laws to give cities the option to adopt a "commission" form of government, which Lincoln adopted for its government in a special election in 1912. This meant that the Lincoln mayor was now to be chosen by the city council from among the council membership instead of elected directly by the voters. This system of Lincoln city government persisted through the election of 1935.

In 1935, the voters of Lincoln adopted an amendment to its city charter increasing the number of city council members from five to seven and creating a system where the mayor was once again directly elected by the voters. However, though no longer chosen by fellow council members, the mayor remained a member of the Lincoln city council. The mayor was still elected to a two-year term while all other council members' terms were increased to four years under the new plan. The first mayor to take office under this new system was Oren S. Copeland in 1937. In the election of 1962, the voters of Lincoln adopted an amendment to the city charter that made the mayor's office separate from the city council and extended the mayor's term to four years. This made the mayor's job a "full-time position" since the mayor was no longer a member of the council. Dean H. Petersen was the first mayor elected in 1963 under this system, which remains the current system of Lincoln's city government.

In 1975, after serving for 16 years on the Lincoln City Council, Helen Boosalis made history by becoming the first woman to serve as mayor of the city of Lincoln. In 1998, Mike Johanns became the first Lincoln mayor to be elected Governor of Nebraska while still in office, though he is not the only Lincoln mayor to be elected governor, as Charles W. Bryan and Victor Anderson also served as governor.

== List ==
This is a list of mayors of Lincoln, Nebraska.

#	Image	Name	Party (Note: Although the office of Mayor of Lincoln is elected on a nonpartisan basis, party affiliations during the time each individual served as mayor are listed here when known.)	Term began	Term ended	Notes
(Note: Lincoln, Nebraska, was officially incorporated as a town on April 7, 1869; interim trustees were chosen for its board of trustees, which functioned as its city council. Permanent trustees were then officially elected by the citizens of Lincoln on May 3, 1869. A chairman was chosen by the trustees, and although there was no official title of "mayor" of Lincoln, the chairman of the Board of Trustees was the de facto mayor of Lincoln. Lincoln was later incorporated as a city on March 18, 1871, which allowed its citizens to directly elect a mayor. While the city of Lincoln does not officially number Humphrey D. Gilbert or Charles H. Gere among its recognized mayors, some consider them to have been the first to effectively hold that position.)		Humphrey D. Gilbert (Note: Humphrey D. Gilbert is almost always referred to by sources as "H. D. Gilbert" or "Dr. H. D. Gilbert." Few sources give his first name, but it can be found in an obscure source, where he is named as the chairman of the Lancaster County Medical Society around the time he was known to be a member of such society.)		April 10, 1869	1870	Served as first chairman of the Lincoln Board of Trustees, making him effectively the mayor of Lincoln
-		Charles Henry Gere	Rep	1870	April 4, 1871	Served as second chairman of the Lincoln Board of Trustees, making him effectively the mayor of Lincoln
1		William F. Chapin	Rep	April 4, 1871	April 10, 1872	First mayor elected directly by the citizens of Lincoln after incorporation as a city; previously served as the speaker of the Nebraska House of Representatives
2		Erastus E. Brown	Rep	April 10, 1872	1873	
3		Robert D. Silver	Dem	1873	April 11, 1874	
4		Samuel W. Little	Temp (Note: Mayor Samuel W. Little appears to have been a member of a "Temperance Party," which was opposed by a "Citizens' Party" in this election.)	April 11, 1874	April 16, 1875	
5		Amasa Cobb (Note: A newspaper refers to J. R. Fairbank as "acting mayor" right before the inauguration of Robert D. Silver on April 11, 1876; however, he could not have served long since Amasa Cobb is still being referred to as the mayor in April 1876.)	Rep	April 16, 1875 (Note: In the published city directory on April 15, 1875, Samuel W. Little is listed as mayor, but in the published city directory on April 17, 1875, Amasa Cobb is listed as the mayor.)	April 11, 1876	Previously served as a U.S. representative from Wisconsin; later served as a Nebraska Supreme Court justice
6		Robert D. Silver	Dem	April 11, 1876	April 11, 1877	Previously served as the 3rd mayor
7		Harvey Wesley Hardy	Rep	April 11, 1877	April 14, 1879	
8		Smith B. Galey (Note: The website for the city of Lincoln lists this mayor as "Seth P. Galey," but no sources from the time seem to identify him as such.)	Rep	April 14, 1879	April 19, 1880	
9		John B. Wright	Rep	April 19, 1880	April 10, 1882	
10		John Doolittle	Rep	April 10, 1882	April 9, 1883	
11		Robert Emmett Moore	Rep	April 9, 1883	April 13, 1885	Later served as lieutenant governor of Nebraska
12		Carlos C. Burr	Rep	April 13, 1885	April 12, 1887	
13		Andrew J. Sawyer	Ind	April 12, 1887	April 9, 1889	
14		Robert B. Graham	Rep	April 9, 1889	April 14, 1891	
15		Austin H. Weir	Ind	April 14, 1891	April 8, 1895	
16		Frank A. Graham	Rep	April 8, 1895	April 10, 1899	
17		Hudson J. Winnett	Rep	April 10, 1899	April 13, 1903	
18		George A. Adams	Rep	April 13, 1903	April 10, 1905	
19		Francis W. Brown	Dem	April 10, 1905	May 11, 1909	
20		Don Lathrop Love	Rep	May 11, 1909	May 8, 1911	
21		Alvin H. Armstrong (Note: Some sources, including his gravestone, spell his first name "Alvan.")	Rep	May 8, 1911	May 13, 1913	Last mayor elected directly by the voters to the mayor's office until Mayor Copeland in 1937
22		Frank C. Zehrung	Rep	May 13, 1913	May 10, 1915	First mayor since Charles H. Gere in 1870 to be elected mayor not by the voters but by a majority vote of the Lincoln City Council from its own membership
23		Charles Wayland Bryan	Dem	May 10, 1915	May 7, 1917	Later became governor of Nebraska
24		John Eschelman Miller	Dem	May 7, 1917	May 9, 1921	Known for being a cofounder of Miller & Paine, a department store in downtown Lincoln
25		Frank C. Zehrung	Rep	May 9, 1921	May 9, 1927	Previously served as the 22nd mayor
26		Verne Hedge	Rep	May 9, 1927	May 13, 1929	
27		Don Lathrop Love	Rep	May 13, 1929	May 11, 1931	Previously served as the 20th mayor
28		Frank C. Zehrung	Rep	May 11, 1931	May 8, 1933	Previously served as the 22nd and 25th mayor
29		Fenton B. Fleming	Rep	May 8, 1933	May 13, 1935	
30		Charles Wayland Bryan	Dem	May 13, 1935	May 10, 1937	Last mayor to be elected by the Lincoln City Council under the old system where mayors were chosen from among the membership of the council by their fellow council members; previously served as the 23rd mayor and as the governor of Nebraska
31		Oren Sturman Copeland	Rep	May 10, 1937	February 28, 1940	First mayor to be directly elected to the mayor's office by the voters of the city since Mayor Alvin Armstrong in 1911; resigned in order to run as a Republican candidate in the 1940 US House of Representatives election in Nebraska's 1st congressional district; served as a member of the US House of Representatives
32		Robert Erle Campbell	Rep	March 4, 1940	May 12, 1941	Selected by the Lincoln City Council to finish Mayor Copeland's unexpired term; served as the chairman of the board of Miller & Paine, replacing John E. Miller, a former Lincoln mayor, in that position
33		Richard O. Johnson	Rep	May 12, 1941	May 10, 1943	
34		Lloyd J. Marti	Rep	May 10, 1943	May 12, 1947	
35		Clarence Gillespie Miles	Dem	May 12, 1947	July 31, 1950	Resigned in order to run as a Democratic candidate in the 1950 US House of Representatives election in Nebraska's 1st congressional district against Republican incumbent Carl Curtis
36 (Note: Thomas R. Pansing only served as "acting mayor" while still maintaining his seat on the Lincoln City Council, but since he served for an extended period, the City of Lincoln's official website counts him as Lincoln's 36th mayor.)		Thomas R. Pansing	Rep	July 31, 1950	September 11, 1950	Served as "acting mayor" after the resignation of Mayor Miles by virtue of his position as vice president of the Lincoln City Council while the council searched for Miles' replacement, which took over a month due to disagreements among council members as to who should be named mayor
37		Victor Anderson	Rep	September 11, 1950	May 18, 1953	Selected by the Lincoln City Council to finish Mayor Miles' unexpired term; later became governor of Nebraska
38		Clark Jeary	Rep	May 18, 1953	July 30, 1956	Resigned to accept a job with the National Bank of Commerce
39		Bennett S. (Abe) Martin	Rep	July 30, 1956	May 18, 1959	Selected by the Lincoln City Council to finish Mayor Jeary's unexpired term
40		Bartlett E. (Pat) Boyles	Dem	May 18, 1959	December 31, 1962	Resigned after being appointed as a Lancaster County District Court judge by Nebraska Governor Frank B. Morrison
41		Dell L. Tyrrell	Rep	January 7, 1963	May 20, 1963	Selected by the Lincoln City Council to finish Mayor Boyles' unexpired term
42		Dean H. Petersen	Rep	May 20, 1963	May 15, 1967	Petersen was Lincoln's first "full-time" mayor elected for a term of four years after the Lincoln City Charter was amended in 1962 to extend the mayor's term from two to four years and make the position full time. Previously, the mayor was considered a member of the city council; Petersen was the first mayor to have a separate office from that of a council member.
43		Sam Schwartzkopf	Dem	May 15, 1967	May 19, 1975	
44		Helen Boosalis	Dem	May 19, 1975	May 16, 1983	First woman to serve as mayor of Lincoln; ran unsuccessfully for governor of Nebraska in 1986
45		Roland Luedtke	Rep	May 16, 1983	May 18, 1987	Previously served as speaker of the Nebraska Legislature and as lieutenant governor of Nebraska before becoming Lincoln mayor
46		Bill Harris	Dem	May 18, 1987	May 20, 1991	
47		Mike Johanns	Rep	May 20, 1991	November 30, 1998	Resigned to become governor of Nebraska
48		Dale Young	Rep	November 30, 1998	May 17, 1999	Selected by the Lincoln City Council to finish Mayor Johanns' unexpired term
49		Don Wesely	Dem	May 17, 1999	May 19, 2003	
50		Coleen J. Seng	Dem	May 19, 2003	May 14, 2007	
51		Chris Beutler	Dem	May 14, 2007	May 20, 2019	Term-limited after three consecutive terms as mayor due to an amendment of the Lincoln City Charter passed in November 2018
52		Leirion Gaylor Baird	Dem	May 20, 2019	Present	
