= Richard Frank =

Richard Frank may refer to:

- Richard N. Frank (1923–2015), American restaurant owner
- Richard Frank (actor) (1953–1995), American actor
- Richárd Frank (born 1990), Hungarian footballer
- Richard B. Frank (born 1947), American military historian
- Richard H. Frank, former president of Walt Disney Studios
- Richard M. Frank, former CEO of Chuck E. Cheese
- Richard A. Frank (1936–2014), American lawyer and administrator of the National Oceanic and Atmospheric Administration
- Richard G. Frank, American healthcare economist and academic
- Richard Frank (priest) (b. 1970) Archdeacon of Middlesex since 2020

== See also ==
- Richard Franck (disambiguation)
