= 2014 United States Senate election in Nebraska =

- November 4, 2014
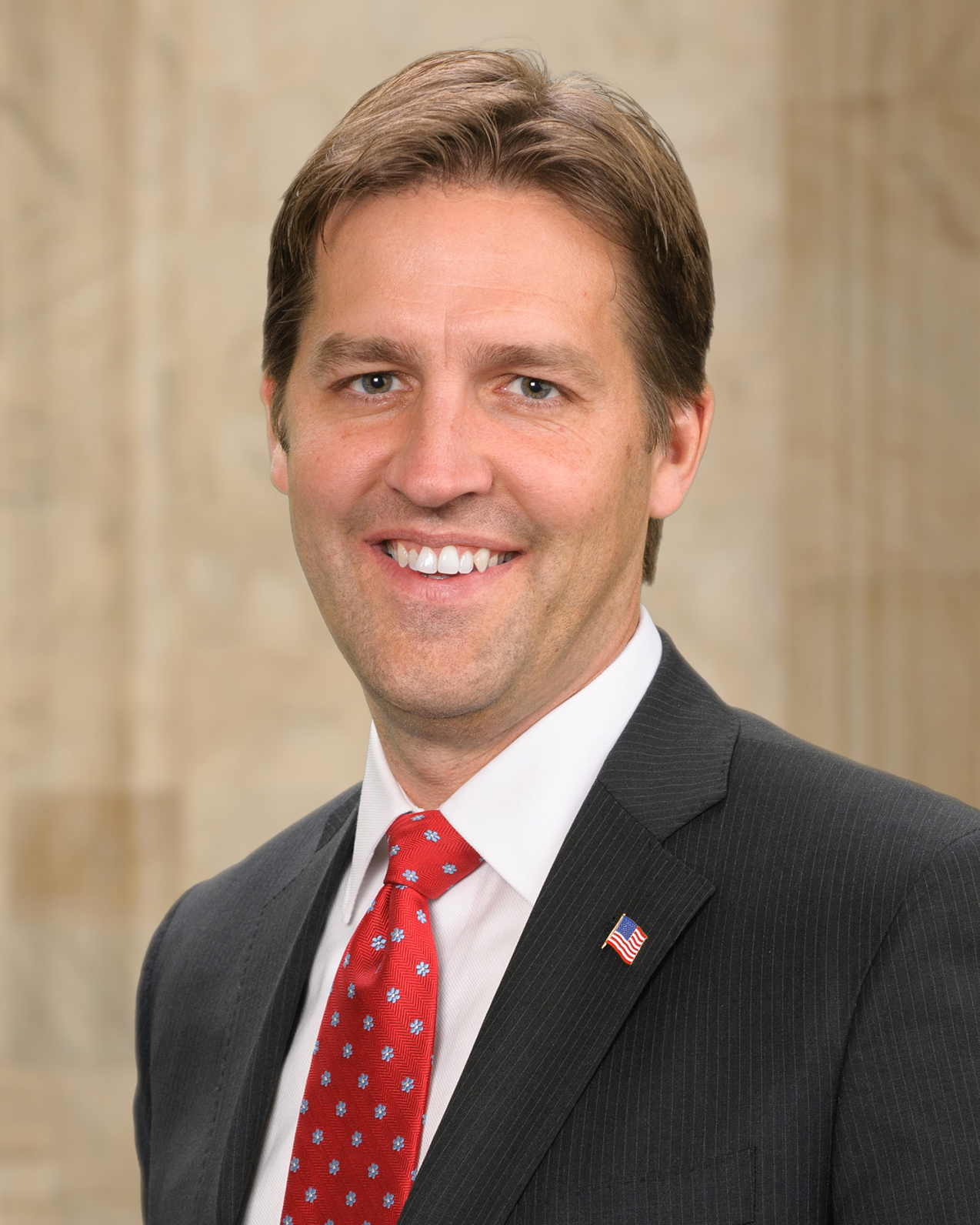

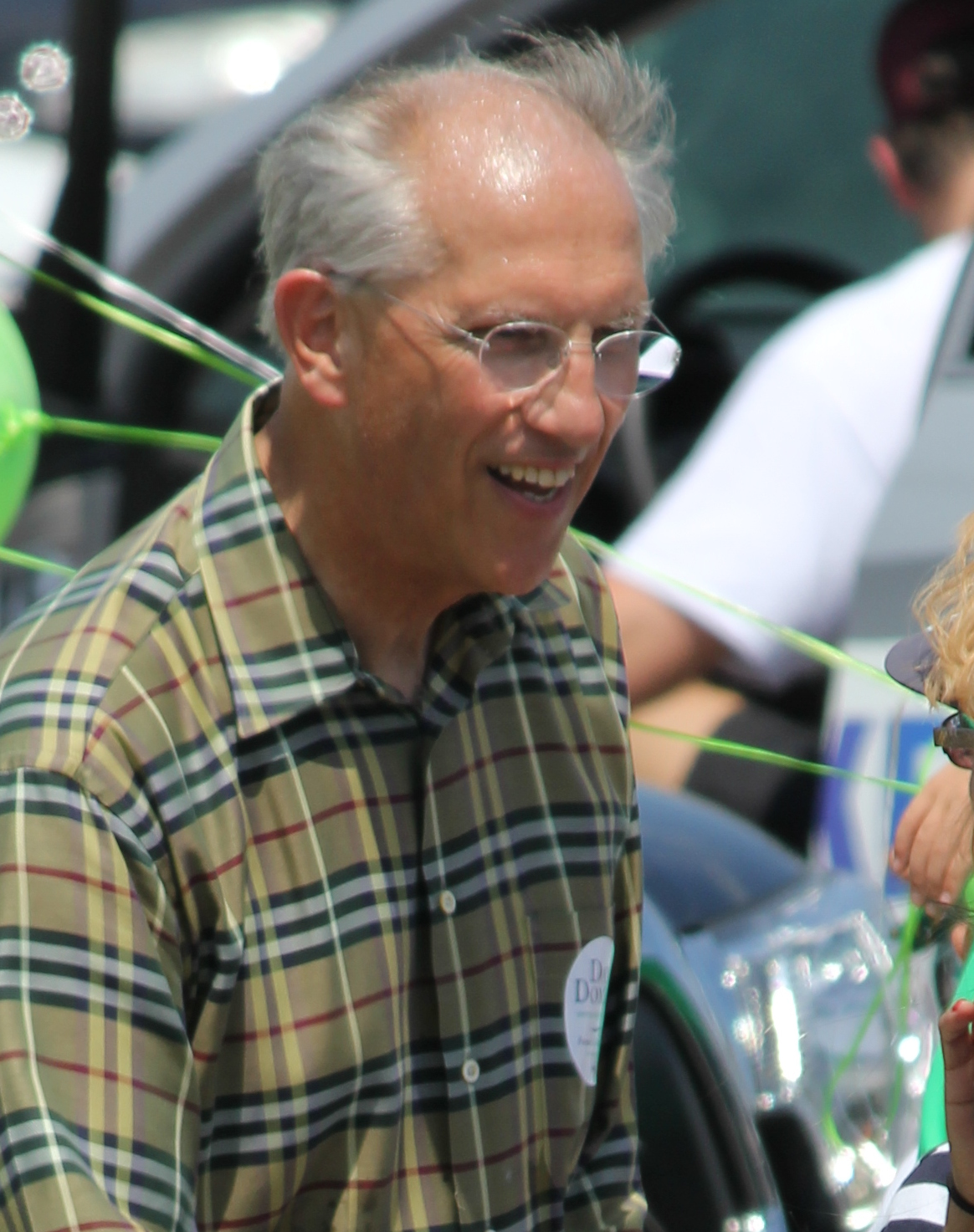
Nominee	Ben Sasse	David Domina
Party	Republican	Democratic
Popular vote	347,636	170,127
Percentage	64.34%	31.49%
- County results Sasse: 50–60% 60–70% 70–80% 80–90%
U.S. senator before election
Mike Johanns
Republican
Elected U.S. Senator
Ben Sasse
Republican

The 2014 United States Senate election in Nebraska took place on November 4, 2014. Incumbent Republican Senator Mike Johanns did not run for re-election to a second term. Republican nominee Ben Sasse defeated Democratic nominee David Domina, to succeed him.

== Republican primary ==
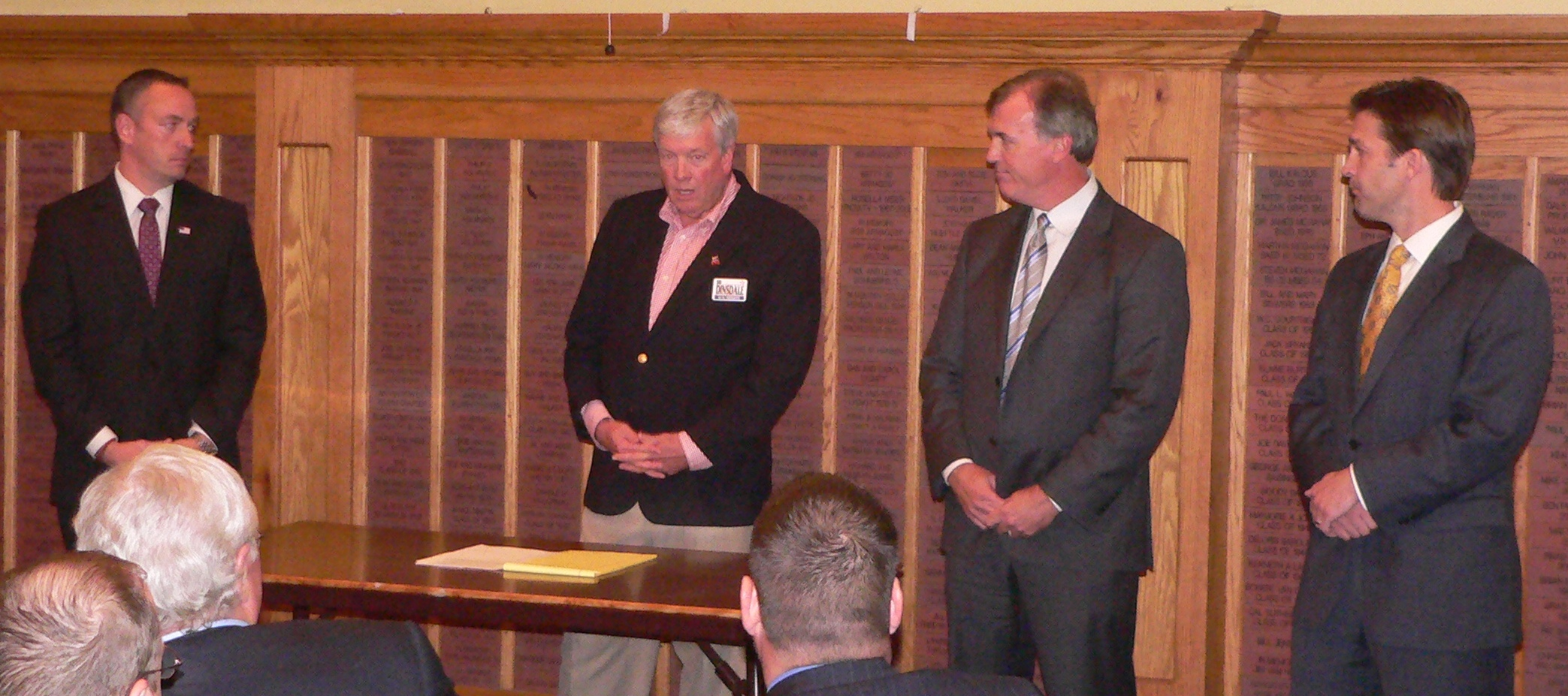
Buffalo County Republican Party candidate event in November 2013. From left to right: Shane Osborn, Sid Dinsdale, Bart McLeay and Ben Sasse.

=== Candidates ===
==== Declared ====
- Sid Dinsdale, president of Pinnacle Bank
- Clifton Johnson, businessman
- Bart McLeay, attorney
- Shane Osborn, former treasurer of Nebraska
- Ben Sasse, president of Midland University

==== Declined ====
- Patrick Borchers, former vice president of academic affairs of Creighton University and former dean of Creighton University School of Law
- Jon Bruning, attorney general of Nebraska (running for governor)
- Mike Foley, auditor of public accounts (running for governor)
- Jeff Fortenberry, U.S. representative
- Dave Heineman, governor of Nebraska
- Charles Herbster, businessman
- Charlie Janssen, state senator (running for state auditor)
- Mike Johanns, incumbent U.S. senator
- Bob Krist, state senator
- Pete Ricketts, former COO of TD Ameritrade and nominee for the U.S. Senate in 2006 and future U.S. senator for this seat (running for governor)
- Adrian Smith, U.S. representative
- Don Stenberg, treasurer of Nebraska, candidate for the U.S. Senate in 1996, 2006 and 2012 and nominee for the U.S. Senate in 2000
- Lee Terry, U.S. representative

=== Endorsements ===
Sid Dinsdale

Individuals

- Tom Osborne, former U.S. representative and former Nebraska Cornhuskers football coach
- Charles Thone, former governor of Nebraska
Bart McLeay

Individuals

- Jon Christensen, former U.S. representative
- David Karnes, former U.S. senator
Shane Osborn

Individuals

- Ray Aguilar, former state senator
- Bill Barrett, former U.S. representative
- Patrick Borchers, former vice president of Academic Affairs of Creighton University and former dean of Creighton Law School
- Colby Coash, state senator
- Doug Cunningham, former state senator
- Pat Engle, former state senator
- Steve Forbes, publishing executive and candidate for president in 1996 and 2000
- Bill Kintner, state senator
- Scott Lautenbaugh, state senator
- John Murante, state senator
- Rich Pahls, former state senator
- Scott Price, state senator
- Jim Scheer, state senator
- Ken Schilz, state senator
- Phyllis Schlafly, conservative activist and founder of the Eagle Forum

Organizations

- Concerned Women PAC
- Family-PAC Federal
- National Defense PAC

Rescinded endorsement

- FreedomWorks
Ben Sasse

Individuals

- Dick Armey, former House Majority Leader and former chairman of FreedomWorks
- Tom Coburn, U.S. senator from Oklahoma
- Ted Cruz, U.S. senator from Texas
- Mark Fahleson, former chairman of the Nebraska Republican Party
- Mike Lee, U.S. senator from Utah
- Mark Levin, talk radio host and conservative political commentator
- Sarah Palin, former governor of Alaska, nominee for vice president of the United States in 2008
- Paul Ryan, U.S. representative from Wisconsin, chairman of the House Committee on the Budget and nominee for vice president of the United States in 2012
- Rick Santorum, former U.S. senator from Pennsylvania
- Pat Toomey, U.S. senator from Pennsylvania

Organizations

- Club for Growth
- Family Research Council
- FreedomWorks
- Gun Owners of America
- Nebraska Farm Bureau Federation PAC
- Senate Conservatives Fund

=== Polling ===
Poll source	Date(s) administered	Sample size	Margin of error	Sid Dinsdale	Clifton Johnson	Bart McLeay	Shane Osborn	Ben Sasse	Other	Undecided
Gravis Marketing	September 6–7, 2013	1,842	± 2.2%	7%	—	2%	41%	5%	—	45%
Public Opinion Strategies^	October 27–28, 2013	400	± 4.9%	7%	—	1%	39%	7%	—	46%
Harper Polling	February 3–4, 2014	565	± 4%	13.1%	—	4.3%	30.4%	29%	—	23.2%
The Polling Company	February 25–28, 2014	400	± 4.9%	9%	1%	2%	35%	24%	—	30%
NSON Opinion Strategy	April 16–20, 2014	400	± 5%	13%	—	—	27%	29%	—	28%
Not disclosed*	April 26–28, 2014	507	± ?	22%	3%	5%	25%	31%	—	14%
Strategic National	May 7–8, 2014	500	± 4.9%	23%	3%	8%	20%	34%	—	11.5%
Magellan Strategies	May 8, 2014	525	± 4.28%	24%	2%	6%	20%	38%	3%	7%

- * Internal poll for Ben Sasse campaign
- ^ Internal poll for Shane Osborn campaign
Hypothetical polling

Poll source	Date(s) administered	Sample size	Margin of error	Jon Bruning	Mike Foley	Shane Osborn	Pete Ricketts	Ben Sasse	Undecided
Harper Polling	June 1–2, 2013	230	± 6.46%	29%	9%	18%	12%	3%	29%

=== Results ===
Results by county Sasse: 40–50%; 50–60%; 60–70%; Dinsdale: 40–50%

Republican primary results
Party	Candidate	Votes	%
Republican	Ben Sasse	110,802	50.44%
Republican	Sid Dinsdale	50,494	22.99%
Republican	Shane Osborn	47,338	21.56%
Republican	Bart McLeay	12,840	5.85%
Republican	Clifton R. Johnson	3,310	1.51%
Total votes		224,784	100.00%

== Democratic primary ==
=== Candidates ===
==== Declared ====
- David Domina, trial attorney and candidate for governor of Nebraska in 1986
- Larry Marvin, Air Force veteran and candidate for U.S. Senate in 2008 and 2012

==== Declined ====
- Brad Ashford, state senator
- Chris Beutler, mayor of Lincoln
- Annette Dubas, state senator
- Mike Fahey, former mayor of Omaha
- Chuck Hassebrook, former regent of the University of Nebraska and candidate for the U.S. Senate in 2012 (running for governor)
- Bob Kerrey, former U.S. senator and former governor of Nebraska
- Steve Lathrop, state senator
- Mike Meister, attorney, nominee for attorney general of Nebraska in 2002 and nominee for governor in 2010
- Kim Robak, former lieutenant governor of Nebraska

=== Endorsements ===
Dave Domina

Organizations

- AFL-CIO
- International Brotherhood of Boilermakers, Iron Ship Builders, Blacksmiths, Forgers and Helpers
- League of Conservation Voters
- National Education Association
- Nebraska Farmers Union
- United Automobile Workers

=== Polling ===
Hypothetical polling

Poll source	Date(s) administered	Sample size	Margin of error	Chris Beutler	Chuck Hassebrook	Steve Lathrop	Mike Meister	Kim Robak	Undecided
Harper Polling	June 1–2, 2013	133	± 8.5%	13%	14%	13%	6%	19%	35%

=== Results ===
Democratic primary results
Party	Candidate	Votes	%
Democratic	Dave Domina	45,648	67.57%
Democratic	Larry Marvin	21,904	32.43%
Total votes		67,552	100.00%

== General election ==
=== Candidates ===
- Dan Buhrdorf (I), former educator and peace activist
- David Domina (D), trial attorney and candidate for governor in 1986
- Jim Jenkins (I), rancher, restaurant owner and former chairman of the Nebraska Ethanol Board
- Ben Sasse (R), president of Midland University
- Todd Watson (I), businessman

=== Debates ===
- Complete video of debate, September 14, 2014

=== Predictions ===
Source	Ranking	As of
The Cook Political Report	Solid R	November 3, 2014
Sabato's Crystal Ball	Safe R	November 3, 2014
Rothenberg Political Report	Safe R	November 3, 2014
Real Clear Politics	Safe R	November 3, 2014

=== Polling ===
Poll source	Date(s) administered	Sample size	Margin of error	Ben Sasse (R)	David Domina (D)	Other	Undecided
Rasmussen Reports	April 7–8, 2014	750	± 4%	52%	27%	5%	16%
Rasmussen Reports	May 14–15, 2014	750	± 4%	51%	34%	5%	10%
CBS News/NYT/YouGov	July 5–24, 2014	858	± 4.4%	56%	34%	1%	9%
CBS News/NYT/YouGov	August 18 – September 2, 2014	987	± 4%	56%	30%	1%	13%
CBS News/NYT/YouGov	September 20 – October 1, 2014	721	± 4%	58%	31%	0%	11%
CBS News/NYT/YouGov	October 16–23, 2014	681	± 5%	59%	30%	0%	11%

Hypothetical polling

Poll source	Date(s) administered	Sample size	Margin of error	Shane Osborn (R)	David Domina (D)	Other	Undecided
Rasmussen Reports	April 7–8, 2014	750	± 4%	48%	27%	5%	20%

Poll source	Date(s) administered	Sample size	Margin of error	Jon Bruning (R)	Chris Beutler (D)	Undecided
Harper Polling	June 1–2, 2013	538	± 4.22%	44%	34%	22%

Poll source	Date(s) administered	Sample size	Margin of error	Mike Foley (R)	Chuck Hassebrook (D)	Undecided
Harper Polling	June 1–2, 2013	538	± 4.22%	48%	30%	22%

Poll source	Date(s) administered	Sample size	Margin of error	Shane Osborn (R)	Steve Lathrop (D)	Undecided
Harper Polling	June 1–2, 2013	538	± 4.22%	47%	29%	25%

Poll source	Date(s) administered	Sample size	Margin of error	Pete Ricketts (R)	Kim Robak (D)	Undecided
Harper Polling	June 1–2, 2013	538	± 4.22%	45%	36%	19%

Poll source	Date(s) administered	Sample size	Margin of error	Ben Sasse (R)	Mike Meister (D)	Undecided
Harper Polling	June 1–2, 2013	538	± 4.22%	35%	24%	41%

=== Results ===
2014 United States Senate election in Nebraska
Party	Candidate	Votes	%	±%
Republican	Ben Sasse	347,636	64.34%	+6.82%
Democratic	Dave Domina	170,127	31.49%	−8.57%
Independent	Jim Jenkins	15,868	2.94%	—
Independent	Todd Watson	6,260	1.16%	—
Write-in		446	0.08%	—
Majority		177,509	32.85%	+15.39%
Total votes		540,337	100.0%	
Republican hold				

==== By county ====
From Secretary of State of Nebraska

County	Ben Sasse Republican		Dave Domina Democratic		Jim Jenkins Independent		Todd Watson Independent		Write-in		Total votes
County	%	#	%	#	%	#	%	#	%	#	Total votes
Adams	68.66%	5,906	26.99%	2,322	2.55%	219	1.77%	152	0.03%	3	8,602
Antelope	72.58%	1,845	24.86%	632	1.85%	47	0.71%	18	0.00%	0	2,542
Arthur	80.00%	144	16.11%	29	2.78%	5	1.11%	2	0.00%	0	180
Banner	86.46%	249	10.76%	31	1.39%	4	1.39%	4	0.00%	0	288
Blaine	72.41%	147	11.82%	24	15.27%	31	0.49%	1	0.00%	0	203
Boone	74.51%	1,643	21.13%	466	3.63%	80	0.68%	15	0.05%	1	2,205
Box Butte	68.03%	2,060	27.61%	836	2.84%	86	1.52%	46	0.00%	0	3,028
Boyd	75.11%	712	21.73%	206	1.79%	17	1.37%	13	0.00%	0	948
Brown	78.42%	883	15.63%	176	4.35%	49	1.60%	18	0.00%	0	1126
Buffalo	74.55%	9,953	16.24%	2,168	7.97%	1,064	1.20%	160	0.04%	5	13,350
Burt	64.03%	1,816	32.93%	934	2.05%	58	0.95%	27	0.04%	1	2,836
Butler	76.50%	2,377	19.34%	601	2.48%	77	1.64%	51	0.03%	1	3,107
Cass	70.57%	6,062	25.72%	2,209	2.37%	204	1.27%	109	0.07%	6	8,590
Cedar	62.76%	1,916	34.72%	1,060	1.21%	37	1.31%	40	0.00%	0	3,053
Chase	85.95%	1,205	9.06%	127	3.28%	46	1.71%	24	0.00%	0	1,402
Cherry	79.36%	1,769	14.63%	326	4.44%	99	1.35%	30	0.22%	5	2,229
Cheyenne	78.71%	2,241	17.42%	496	2.46%	70	1.40%	40	0.00%	0	2,847
Clay	77.89%	1,687	17.54%	380	2.68%	58	1.85%	40	0.05%	1	2,166
Colfax	71.25%	1,405	25.66%	506	1.93%	38	1.12%	22	0.05%	1	1,972
Cuming	74.32%	2,144	23.12%	667	1.66%	48	0.90%	26	0.00%	0	2,885
Custer	59.36%	2,536	9.83%	420	29.38%	1,255	1.43%	61	0.00%	0	4,272
Dakota	59.20%	2,208	36.38%	1,357	2.71%	101	1.72%	64	0.00%	0	3,730
Dawes	70.66%	1,912	24.46%	662	2.85%	77	2.03%	55	0.00%	0	2,706
Dawson	75.98%	4,220	16.96%	942	5.69%	316	1.33%	74	0.04%	2	5,554
Deuel	80.43%	555	13.04%	90	4.35%	30	2.17%	15	0.00%	0	690
Dixon	66.29%	1,280	30.92%	597	1.55%	30	1.19%	23	0.05%	1	1,931
Dodge	69.81%	7,324	27.07%	2,840	2.06%	216	0.98%	103	0.09%	9	10,492
Douglas	56.42%	81,226	40.92%	58,917	1.83%	2,628	0.70%	1,008	0.14%	195	143,974
Dundy	85.40%	591	9.97%	69	2.60%	18	2.02%	14	0.00%	0	692
Fillmore	70.84%	1,635	25.48%	588	2.30%	53	1.39%	32	0.00%	0	2,308
Franklin	79.82%	1,084	13.77%	187	5.08%	69	1.33%	18	0.00%	0	1,358
Frontier	83.25%	805	12.00%	116	3.21%	31	1.55%	15	0.00%	0	967
Furnas	80.72%	1,344	12.85%	214	2.58%	43	3.78%	63	0.06%	1	1,665
Gage	64.10%	4,705	31.74%	2,330	2.96%	217	1.17%	86	0.03%	2	7,340
Garden	80.25%	508	13.27%	84	5.21%	33	1.26%	8	0.00%	0	633
Garfield	76.44%	558	17.12%	125	4.52%	33	1.92%	14	0.00%	0	730
Gosper	72.98%	543	14.92%	111	9.01%	67	3.09%	23	0.00%	0	744
Grant	72.63%	199	19.34%	53	6.57%	18	1.46%	4	0.00%	0	274
Greeley	67.80%	556	28.05%	230	3.41%	28	0.73%	6	0.00%	0	820
Hall	66.18%	9,214	29.14%	4,057	3.11%	433	1.46%	203	0.11%	15	13,922
Hamilton	78.21%	2,847	17.09%	622	3.05%	111	1.65%	60	0.00%	0	3,640
Harlan	79.91%	1,074	14.81%	199	3.05%	41	2.23%	30	0.00%	0	1,344
Hayes	87.12%	399	7.21%	33	4.59%	21	0.87%	4	0.22%	1	458
Hitchcock	83.43%	977	12.13%	142	2.99%	35	1.45%	17	0.00%	0	1171
Holt	71.93%	2,675	24.79%	922	1.77%	66	1.43%	53	0.08%	3	3,719
Hooker	72.11%	212	14.97%	44	11.22%	33	1.70%	5	0.00%	0	294
Howard	69.51%	1,452	26.14%	546	2.44%	51	1.91%	40	0.00%	0	2,089
Jefferson	70.65%	1,827	25.87%	669	2.44%	63	1.04%	27	0.00%	0	2,586
Johnson	64.71%	1,082	31.76%	531	1.85%	31	1.50%	25	0.18%	3	1,672
Kearney	78.71%	2,044	13.90%	361	6.28%	163	1.00%	26	0.12%	3	2,597
Keith	79.63%	2,083	13.80%	361	5.08%	133	1.45%	38	0.04%	1	2,616
Keya Paha	82.89%	315	13.95%	53	1.32%	5	1.84%	7	0.00%	0	380
Kimball	80.53%	972	14.08%	170	3.07%	37	2.32%	28	0.00%	0	1207
Knox	66.14%	2,100	29.07%	923	3.15%	100	1.57%	50	0.06%	2	3,175
Lancaster	51.68%	44,462	43.31%	37,265	3.34%	2,870	1.57%	1,350	0.10%	86	86,033
Lincoln	72.46%	7,750	22.96%	2,456	3.43%	367	1.08%	116	0.06%	6	10,695
Logan	81.92%	290	11.30%	40	5.93%	21	0.85%	3	0.00%	0	354
Loup	72.56%	230	16.40%	52	10.41%	33	0.63%	2	0.00%	0	317
Madison	69.01%	6,476	28.09%	2,636	1.91%	179	0.95%	89	0.04%	4	9,384
McPherson	76.61%	190	16.13%	40	4.44%	11	2.82%	7	0.00%	0	248
Merrick	76.27%	2,211	19.08%	553	3.21%	93	1.45%	42	0.00%	0	2,899
Morrill	81.18%	1,255	15.27%	236	2.33%	36	1.03%	16	0.19%	3	1,546
Nance	69.44%	818	26.99%	318	2.38%	28	1.02%	12	0.17%	2	1178
Nemaha	72.11%	1,730	23.09%	554	3.08%	74	1.71%	41	0.00%	0	2,399
Nuckolls	76.95%	1,175	18.21%	278	3.14%	48	1.70%	26	0.00%	0	1,527
Otoe	70.78%	3,828	25.37%	1,372	2.51%	136	1.26%	68	0.07%	4	5,408
Pawnee	72.10%	788	25.25%	276	1.19%	13	1.46%	16	0.00%	0	1093
Perkins	82.73%	862	12.28%	128	4.32%	45	0.58%	6	0.10%	1	1042
Phelps	80.43%	2,725	13.96%	473	4.34%	147	1.24%	42	0.03%	1	3,388
Pierce	78.19%	1,843	18.88%	445	1.91%	45	1.02%	24	0.00%	0	2,357
Platte	78.38%	7,282	18.57%	1,725	2.13%	198	0.90%	84	0.02%	2	9,291
Polk	78.24%	1,384	17.98%	318	2.94%	52	0.79%	14	0.06%	1	1,769
Red Willow	83.36%	2,941	12.53%	442	2.78%	98	1.30%	46	0.03%	1	3,528
Richardson	73.71%	1,901	22.92%	591	1.78%	46	1.47%	38	0.12%	3	2,579
Rock	78.48%	496	16.46%	104	3.64%	23	1.42%	9	0.00%	0	632
Saline	59.35%	2,184	36.88%	1,357	2.72%	100	1.03%	38	0.03%	1	3,680
Sarpy	67.73%	30,281	29.44%	13,163	1.86%	831	0.86%	384	0.11%	49	44,708
Saunders	70.85%	5,174	25.62%	1,871	2.27%	166	1.19%	87	0.07%	5	7,303
Scotts Bluff	73.19%	7,106	22.71%	2,205	2.90%	282	1.15%	112	0.04%	4	9,709
Seward	70.32%	3,860	24.87%	1,365	3.52%	193	1.24%	68	0.05%	3	5,489
Sheridan	83.99%	1,453	11.97%	207	2.72%	47	1.33%	23	0.00%	0	1,730
Sherman	68.66%	896	22.61%	295	7.51%	98	1.23%	16	0.00%	0	1305
Sioux	83.46%	444	13.72%	73	1.50%	8	1.32%	7	0.00%	0	532
Stanton	72.23%	1,256	24.55%	427	1.90%	33	1.27%	22	0.06%	1	1,739
Thayer	74.77%	1,476	21.33%	421	2.68%	53	1.22%	24	0.00%	0	1,974
Thomas	78.59%	246	14.70%	46	5.11%	16	1.60%	5	0.00%	0	313
Thurston	50.21%	713	46.69%	663	1.83%	26	1.27%	18	0.00%	0	1420
Valley	74.24%	1,216	21.12%	346	3.66%	60	0.98%	16	0.00%	0	1,638
Washington	73.91%	5,105	23.35%	1,613	1.85%	128	0.83%	57	0.06%	4	6,907
Wayne	64.47%	1,729	32.18%	863	1.79%	48	1.49%	40	0.07%	2	2,682
Webster	73.66%	948	23.23%	299	1.40%	18	1.71%	22	0.00%	0	1287
Wheeler	75.74%	309	18.63%	76	3.92%	16	1.47%	6	0.25%	1	408
York	74.43%	3,377	17.06%	774	5.71%	259	2.80%	127	0.00%	0	4,537

Counties that flipped from Democratic to Republican

- Lancaster (largest city: Lincoln)
- Saline (largest city: Crete)
- Greeley (largest city: Spalding)
- Sherman (largest city: Loup City)
- Gage (largest city: Beatrice)
- Webster (largest city: Red Cloud)
- Franklin (largest city: Franklin)
- Adams (largest city: Hastings)

== See also ==
- 2014 Nebraska gubernatorial election
- 2014 United States House of Representatives elections in Nebraska
- 2014 United States Senate elections
- 2014 United States elections
