= Rebecca Haffajee =

American lawyer and public health researcher

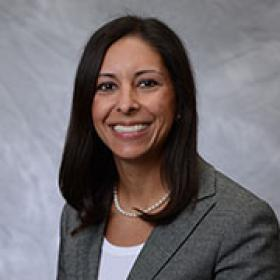

Assistant Secretary of Health and Human Services for Planning and Evaluation
- Assuming office
- President: Joe Biden
- Succeeding: Stephen T. Parente

Personal details
- Education: Duke University (BA); Harvard University (JD, MPH, PhD)

Rebecca Haffajee is an American lawyer and public health researcher who was the nominee to serve as assistant secretary of health and human services for planning and evaluation. She served in the role in an acting capacity from March 2021 till 2024.

== Early life and education ==
Haffajee was raised in Massachusetts. She earned a Bachelor of Arts degree in women's studies and health policy from Duke University, a Juris Doctor from Harvard Law School, a Master of public health from the Harvard T.H. Chan School of Public Health, and PhD in health policy from Harvard University.

== Career ==
Haffajee worked as a policy researcher at the RAND Corporation and an assistant professor at the University of Michigan School of Public Health. She also practices health law at Ropes & Gray and was a legal fellow at the Georgetown University Law Center.
