= Bureau of Plant Industry =

Bureau of Plant Industry may be:

- Bureau of Plant Industry (Philippines), an agency of the Philippine Department of Agriculture
- Bureau of Plant Industry (United States), an agency of the United States Department of Agriculture
  - Nebraska Bureau of Plant Industry
  - Mississippi Bureau of Plant Industry
