= David Domina =

American lawyer and politician

Dave Domina
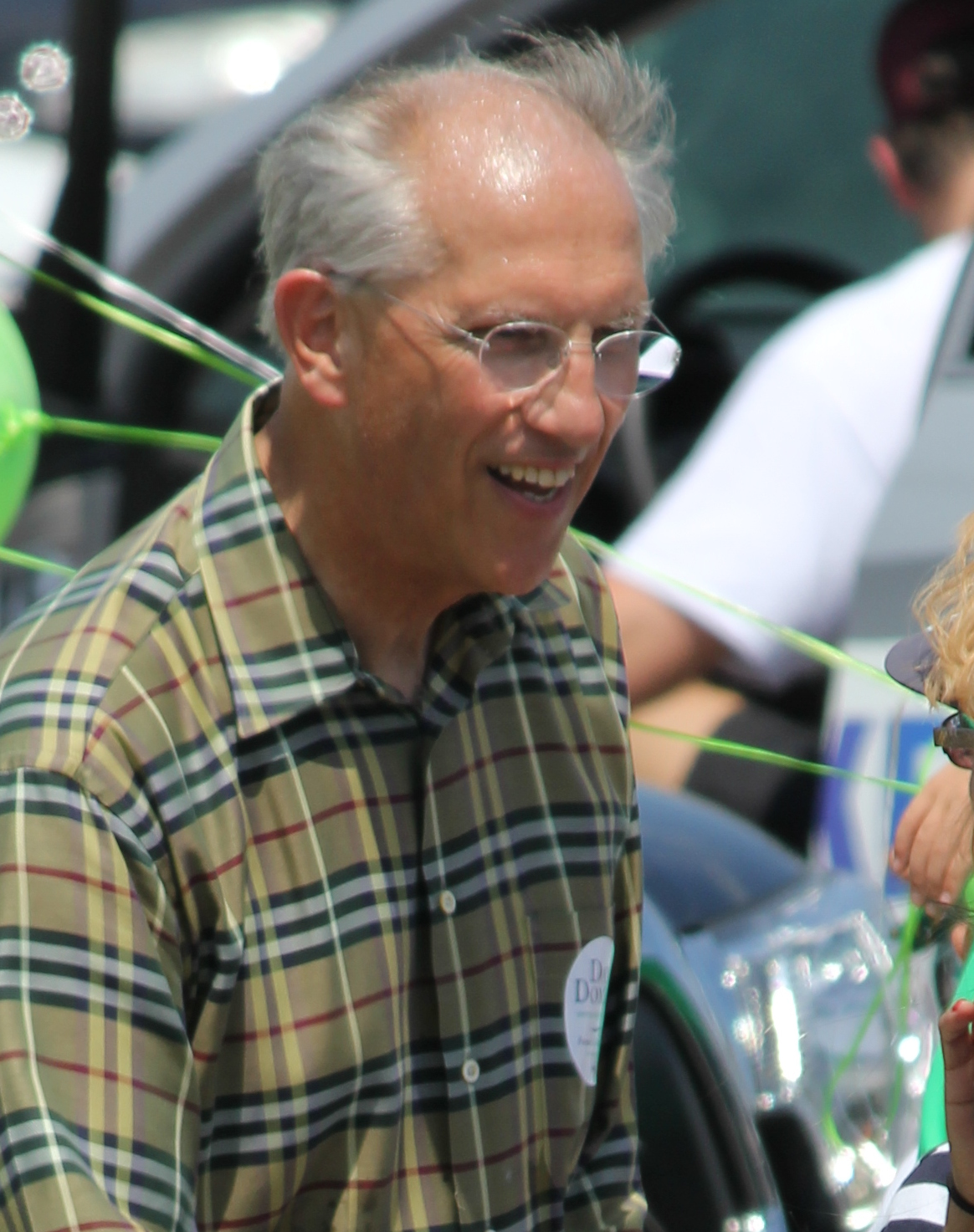

Personal details
- Born: Cedar County, Nebraska, U.S.
- Party: Democratic
- Education: University of Nebraska–Lincoln (JD)

David Alan Domina is a lawyer and politician from the U.S. state of Nebraska. A member of the Democratic Party, he was involved in a number of high-profile legal cases, including the impeachment of Nebraska Attorney General Paul L. Douglas in 1986, and that of University of Nebraska regent David Hergert in 2006. Beginning in 2012, he represented opponents of the Keystone XL pipeline in contesting a legislative measure relating to the use of eminent domain for the pipeline.

In 1986, Domina unsuccessfully ran for the Democratic nomination in Nebraska's gubernatorial election. In 2014, he was the Democratic nominee for the U.S. Senate seat to be vacated by Mike Johanns; he lost the election to Republican Ben Sasse, taking 31.5% of the vote to Sasse's 64.3%.

== Early life and career ==
Domina was born in Cedar County in northeastern Nebraska, and grew up on a farm. In 1972, he graduated from the University of Nebraska College of Law. In 1973, he began practicing law in Norfolk, Nebraska. From 1973 to 1979, he worked as a lawyer in the Judge Advocate General Corps of the U.S. Army and Army Reserve. In 1982, he started his own legal practice.

In November 1983, Nebraska banking regulators closed Commonwealth Savings, the state's largest industrial savings and loan, declaring it insolvent. Two weeks later, Nebraska Attorney General Paul L. Douglas disqualified himself from matters related to Commonwealth, and appointed Domina as special assistant attorney general to investigate the matter. The investigation led to Douglas's impeachment by the Nebraska legislature, on charges including misrepresenting his financial dealings with Commonwealth vice-president Marvin Copple, lying to the investigators, failing to disclose his conflict of interest in matters related to Commonwealth and the Copple family, engaging in insider borrowing, and failing to investigate when warned by the FBI of financial irregularities at Commonwealth. The Nebraska Supreme Court split 4–3 in favor of finding Douglas guilty on one of the six articles of impeachment; since five votes were necessary to convict, Douglas was acquitted.

In 1986, Domina sought the Democratic nomination in the Nebraska gubernatorial election. In the primary, he came in second in an essentially three-way race: Helen Boosalis, the mayor of Lincoln, won the nomination with 44% of the vote, carrying 77 of Nebraska's 93 counties; Domina received 26.2% of the vote, carrying 16 counties; and Lincoln legislator Chris Beutler came in third, with 21.8% of the vote. Minor candidates and write-ins comprised the remaining 8% of the vote. Boosalis went on to lose the general election to Republican candidate Kay Orr.

In 1989, Domina moved from Norfolk to Omaha, where his firm had opened an office. In 1997, he separated from his partners in Norfolk, establishing a new firm in Omaha.

== 1997–2014 ==
Domina was co-lead counsel for the plaintiffs in Pickett v. Tyson Fresh Meats, Inc. This class-action suit was brought by cattle producers against meat-packing company IBP, which was acquired by Tyson Foods during the course of the suit. The suit maintained that IBP and Tyson used anticompetitive captive supply contracts to depress the market prices of cattle, in contravention of the Packers and Stockyards Act. In 2004, a jury found for the plaintiffs, ordering Tyson to return $1.28 billion to members of the class. The trial judge, Lyle Elmer Strom, then ruled in favor of Tyson's motion for judgment as a matter of law, setting aside the jury's verdict. The United States Court of Appeals for the Eleventh Circuit upheld the judge's ruling; the U.S. Supreme Court declined to hear the case, delivering a final victory to Tyson.

In a 2004 election, David Hergert defeated incumbent Don Blank for a seat on the University of Nebraska Board of Regents. After the election, it was discovered that Hergert had missed a deadline for filing a campaign-finance report; the belated filing had deprived Blank of $15,000 in public money for his campaign. In April 2006, Hergert was impeached by a vote of the Nebraska legislature. Domina was retained by the legislature to prosecute the ensuing case before the Nebraska Supreme Court. Hergert's defense argued that his violations of the law were not impeachable, since they occurred before he had taken office and not during his term as regent. Domina responded that Hergert would not have won the election had he not transgressed the law, and that the transgressions were therefore connected to his holding office. The Supreme Court, stating in its decision "During the campaign and, significantly, after he took office, Hergert intentionally filed false reports of campaign spending in an attempt to cover up his conduct", found Hergert guilty on charges of false reporting and obstruction of government operations, and removed him from office in July 2006.

In 2008, Republican Beau McCoy defeated Democrat Rex Moats in an officially nonpartisan election for a seat in the Nebraska legislature. In the course of the campaign, the Nebraska Republican Party sent out a series of mailings opposing Moats, and calling attention to his association with a failed insurance company. Domina represented Moats in a suit against the party, claiming that the publications violated Nebraska's Consumer Protection Act, defamed Moats, and subjected him to invasion of privacy by false light. A Douglas County district judge dismissed the suit in 2009; in 2011, Domina argued an appeal before the Nebraska Supreme Court. The higher court rejected the appeal, finding that the statements in the Republican mailings were protected by the First Amendment.

Domina represented three Nebraska opponents of the Keystone XL pipeline in Thompson v. Heineman, filed in 2012. The suit argued that the Nebraska legislature illegally transferred eminent-domain powers along the pipeline route from the state's Public Service Commission (PSC) to the governor, in contravention of separation of powers and of a Nebraska constitutional provision giving such powers to the PSC. The case was heard in Lancaster County District Court in September 2013. In February 2014, the judge found for the plaintiffs, ruling the legislature's action unconstitutional. The case was appealed to the Nebraska Supreme Court, which issued its ruling in January 2015: a majority of four justices found the challenged pipeline-route law unconstitutional; the remaining three justices found that the plaintiffs in the case lacked standing to challenge the law. Since a five-justice supermajority was necessary to strike down a Nebraska law as unconstitutional, the court's decision effectively upheld the pipeline law, reversing the District Court's ruling.

== 2014 U.S. Senate campaign ==
In January 2014, Domina announced his candidacy for the U.S. Senate seat held by Republican Mike Johanns, who had announced that he would not seek reelection. Domina had changed his voter registration from independent to Democratic in October 2013, at about the time that he began contemplating a run for Senate. He was the first Democrat to enter the race; at the time of his announcement, there were four declared Republican candidates and an independent.

Prior to his announcement, Domina discussed issues that he might address, including what he called a "fundamentally unfair" tax system, to be remedied by raising taxes on higher-income Americans; policies he described as favoring large corporations over small businesses; and events such as the 2013 federal government shutdown, which he attributed to partisan and ideological warfare in Congress.

In the Democratic primary, Domina faced Larry Marvin, a native of Fremont and an Air Force veteran. Marvin had been active in the Democratic Party for over 40 years. In 2008, he had sought the Democratic nomination in a U.S. Senate race; in the primary election, he had finished last of fourth candidates, with 2.8% of the vote. In 2012, he had again run for the U.S. Senate; in the Democratic primary, he had finished fourth of five candidates, with 2.5% of the vote.

In the May 2014 Democratic primary, Domina received 45,648 votes, or 67.6% of the total, to Marvin's 21,483 (32.4%).

Domina lost the November general election, with 170,127 votes, or 31.5% of the total, to Republican Ben Sasse's 347,636 votes (64.3%). Two independent candidates and write-in votes accounted for 22,574 votes (4.2%).

Party political offices
Preceded by Scott Kleeb	Democratic nominee for U.S. Senator from Nebraska (Class 2); 2014	Succeeded by Chris Janicek; Disavowed
Preceded by Scott Kleeb	Democratic nominee for U.S. Senator from Nebraska (Class 2); 2014	Succeeded by Preston Love Jr. Endorsed
