= Ben Sasse =

American academic administrator and politician from Nebraska (born 1972)

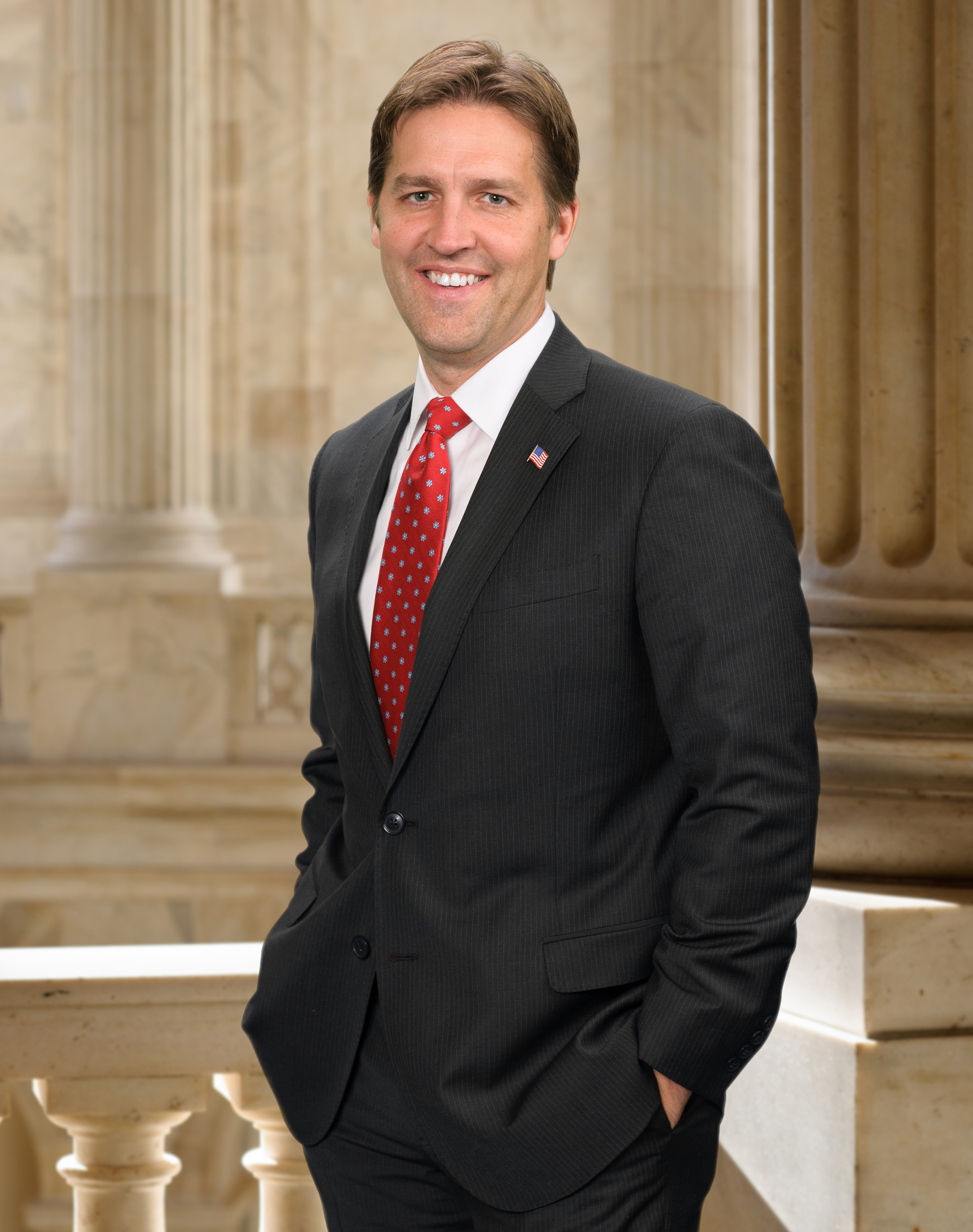
- Official portrait, 2014

13th President of the University of Florida
- In office February 6, 2023 – July 31, 2024
- Preceded by: Kent Fuchs
- Succeeded by: Kent Fuchs (acting)

United States Senator from Nebraska
- In office January 3, 2015 – January 8, 2023
- Preceded by: Mike Johanns
- Succeeded by: Pete Ricketts

15th President of Midland University
- In office December 10, 2010 – December 31, 2014
- Preceded by: Stephen Fritz
- Succeeded by: Jody Horner

Assistant Secretary of Health and Human Services for Planning and Evaluation
- In office December 19, 2007 – January 20, 2009
- President: George W. Bush
- Preceded by: Michael O'Grady
- Succeeded by: Sherry Glied

Personal details
- Born: Benjamin Eric Sasse; February 22, 1972 (age 54) Plainview, Nebraska, U.S.
- Party: Republican
- Spouse: Melissa McLeod (m. 1995)
- Children: 3
- Education: Harvard University (BA); St. John's College (MA); Yale University (MA, MPhil, PhD)

Academic background
- Thesis: The Anti-Madalyn Majority: Secular Left, Religious Right, and the Rise of Reagan’s America (2004)
- Doctoral advisor: Jon Butler; Harry Stout

Academic work
- Discipline: Political science
- Institutions: University of Texas, Austin; Midland University
- Sasse's voice Sasse on the American Creed and its relation to police reform after the murder of George Floyd. Recorded June 17, 2020

Benjamin Eric Sasse ( /ˈsæs/ SASS; born February 22, 1972) is an American politician and academic administrator. He represented Nebraska in the United States Senate from 2015 to 2023, resigning to become the president of the University of Florida. He is a member of the Republican Party. A critic of Donald Trump, Sasse is one of seven Republican senators who voted to convict Trump of incitement of insurrection in his second impeachment trial.

Born in Plainview, Nebraska, Sasse studied at Harvard University, St. John's College, and Yale University. He taught at the University of Texas and served as an assistant secretary in the U.S. Department of Health and Human Services in the George W. Bush administration. In 2010, Sasse was named the 15th president of Midland University in Fremont, Nebraska.

Sasse was elected to the U.S. Senate in 2014 and was re-elected in 2020. He resigned from the Senate in January 2023 to become president of the University of Florida. Sasse resigned his position at the University in July 2024, citing his wife's health issues. In December 2025, he announced that he had been diagnosed with terminal pancreatic cancer.

== Early life and education ==
Sasse was born on February 22, 1972, in Plainview, Nebraska, the son of Gary Lynn Sasse, a high school teacher and football coach, and Linda Sasse. He graduated from Fremont Senior High School in 1990 and was valedictorian of his class.

Sasse graduated from Harvard College in 1994 with a bachelor's degree in government. He also studied at the University of Oxford during the fall of 1992 on a junior-year-abroad program. In 1998, Sasse earned a Master of Arts in liberal studies from the Graduate Institute at St. John's College. He earned a Master of Arts, Master of Philosophy, and, in 2004, a PhD in history from Yale University. His dissertation was directed by Jon Butler and Harry Stout. Sasse's doctoral dissertation, "The Anti-Madalyn Majority: Secular Left, Religious Right, and the Rise of Reagan's America", won the Theron Rockwell Field and George Washington Egleston Prizes.

In 2000, The Mustard Seed Foundation selected Sasse as a Harvey Fellow.

== Early career ==
From September 1994 to November 1995, Sasse worked as an associate consultant at the management consulting firm Boston Consulting Group. For the next year, he served as consultant/executive director for Christians United For Reformation (CURE). During his tenure, CURE merged with the Alliance of Confessing Evangelicals (ACE), and Sasse became executive director of ACE in Anaheim, California.

From January 2004 to January 2005, Sasse served as chief of staff for the Justice Department's Office of Legal Policy and as a part-time assistant professor at the University of Texas at Austin, commuting to Austin to teach. Sasse left the Department of Justice to serve as chief of staff to Representative Jeff Fortenberry from January to July 2005.

Sasse then advised the United States Department of Homeland Security on national security issues from July to September 2005 as a consultant. He moved to Austin, Texas, to resume his professorship full-time from September 2005 to December 2006.

From December 2006 to December 2007, Sasse served as counselor to the secretary at the United States Department of Health and Human Services (HHS) in Washington, D.C., advising the secretary on a broad spectrum of health policy issues, from healthcare access to food safety and security.

In July 2007, President George W. Bush nominated Sasse to the post of assistant secretary for planning and evaluation in the U.S. Department of Health and Human Services. The Senate confirmed him in December 2007 and he served until the end of the Bush administration, in January 2009. While at HHS, Sasse took an unpaid leave from the University of Texas.

During 2009, Sasse advised private equity clients and health care investors and taught at the University of Texas. In October 2009, he officially joined the LBJ School of Public Affairs Center for Politics and Governance as a fellow, before being appointed president of Midland University. While at Texas, he was critical of Obama-era proposals to expand public health care programs. He criticized public-option proposals as a step toward single-payer health insurance and health-care rationing. He supported a plan to lower the cost of Medicare by raising the eligibility age and cutting benefits. He also coauthored a paper proposing limits to Medicaid reimbursements for hospital care for the uninsured.

=== Midland Lutheran College ===
Sasse was announced as the 15th president of Midland Lutheran College in October 2009. At 37, he was one of the youngest chief executives in American higher education when he took over leadership of the 128-year-old institution in spring 2010. Sasse's grandfather, Elmer Sasse, had worked for Midland as vice president of finance. The school was experiencing financial and academic difficulties; Sasse has been credited with "turn[ing] it around", rebranding "Midland Lutheran College" as Midland University, instituting new policies (including spot quizzes and class attendance), and "prodigious fundraising".

Sasse was installed as president on December 10, 2010. When he was appointed, enrollment was at a historic low and the college was "on the verge of bankruptcy". During his tenure as president, enrollment grew from 590 to 1,300 students. When nearby Dana College was forced to close, Sasse hired much of its faculty and enabled most of its students to transfer to Midland.

When Sasse announced his intention to run for U.S. Senate, he offered to resign his post at Midland Lutheran College. Instead, the board asked him to stay under a partial leave of absence; in October 2013, his employment contract was amended to reduce his pay. After winning the Republican primary election, Sasse announced that he would step down as president of Midland Lutheran College, effective December 31, 2014.

== U.S. Senate ==
=== Elections ===
==== 2014 ====
In October 2013, Sasse announced his candidacy for the Senate seat held by Republican Mike Johanns, who was not seeking reelection. As of October 2013, his fundraising total of nearly $815,000 from individual donors in his first quarter broke Nebraska's previous record of $526,000 from individual donors, set in 2007 by Johanns while he was U.S. Secretary of Agriculture. Upon announcing his candidacy, Sasse expressed strong opposition to the Affordable Care Act. His primary opponent, former state Treasurer Shane Osborn, questioned the depth of Sasse's opposition to the ACA, publicizing articles and speeches Sasse delivered during and after the act's passage through Congress. According to the Omaha World-Herald, the Osborn campaign appeared "intent on questioning whether Sasse is a true conservative." The Osborn campaign cited a 2009 Bloomberg Businessweek Sasse column titled "Health-Care Reform: The Rush to Pass a Bad Bill" (which stated, "There's an emerging consensus that this [an individual mandate] might be a good idea"). The Osborn campaign also cited a 2010 speech in which Sasse said Republicans would probably lack the votes to repeal the ACA, that "a middle-class entitlement has never been repealed", and that Republicans had staged "symbolic repeal votes" instead of offering a viable alternative to the ACA. Sasse's response was that in his articles and speeches, he was describing the political landscape rather than giving his own opinions on the ACA's merits; to a World-Herald reporter, he said, "I have never changed my position on thinking Obamacare is a bad idea".

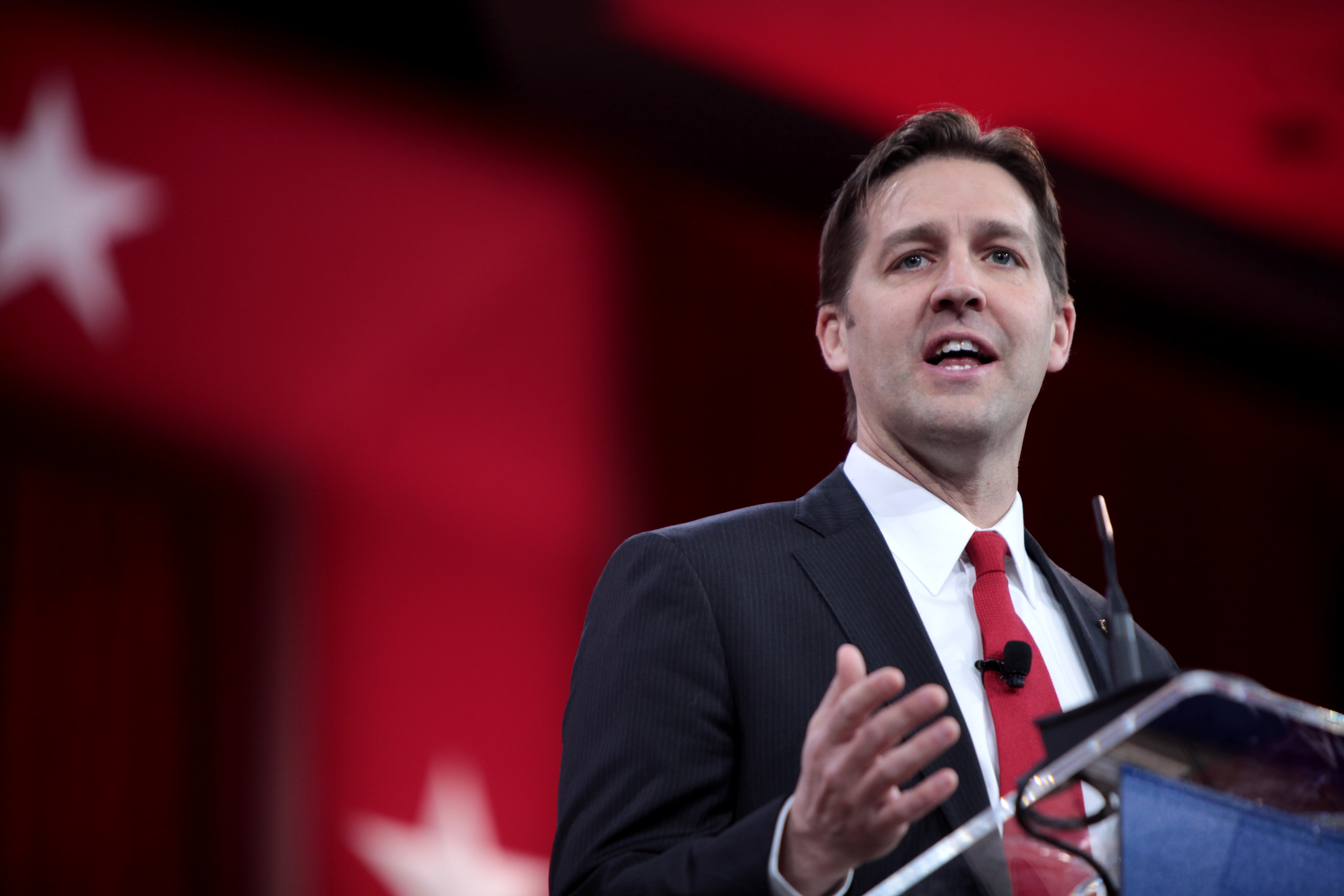
Sasse speaking at 2015 Conservative Political Action Conference

On May 13, 2014, Sasse won 92 of 93 counties and secured the Republican nomination with 109,829 votes, or 49.4% of all votes cast; banker Sid Dinsdale came in second, with 49,829 votes (22.4%), followed by Osborn, with 46,850 votes (21.1%).

On November 4, 2014, Sasse won the general election, defeating Democratic nominee David Domina with 64.4% of the vote to Domina's 31.5%.

==== 2020 ====
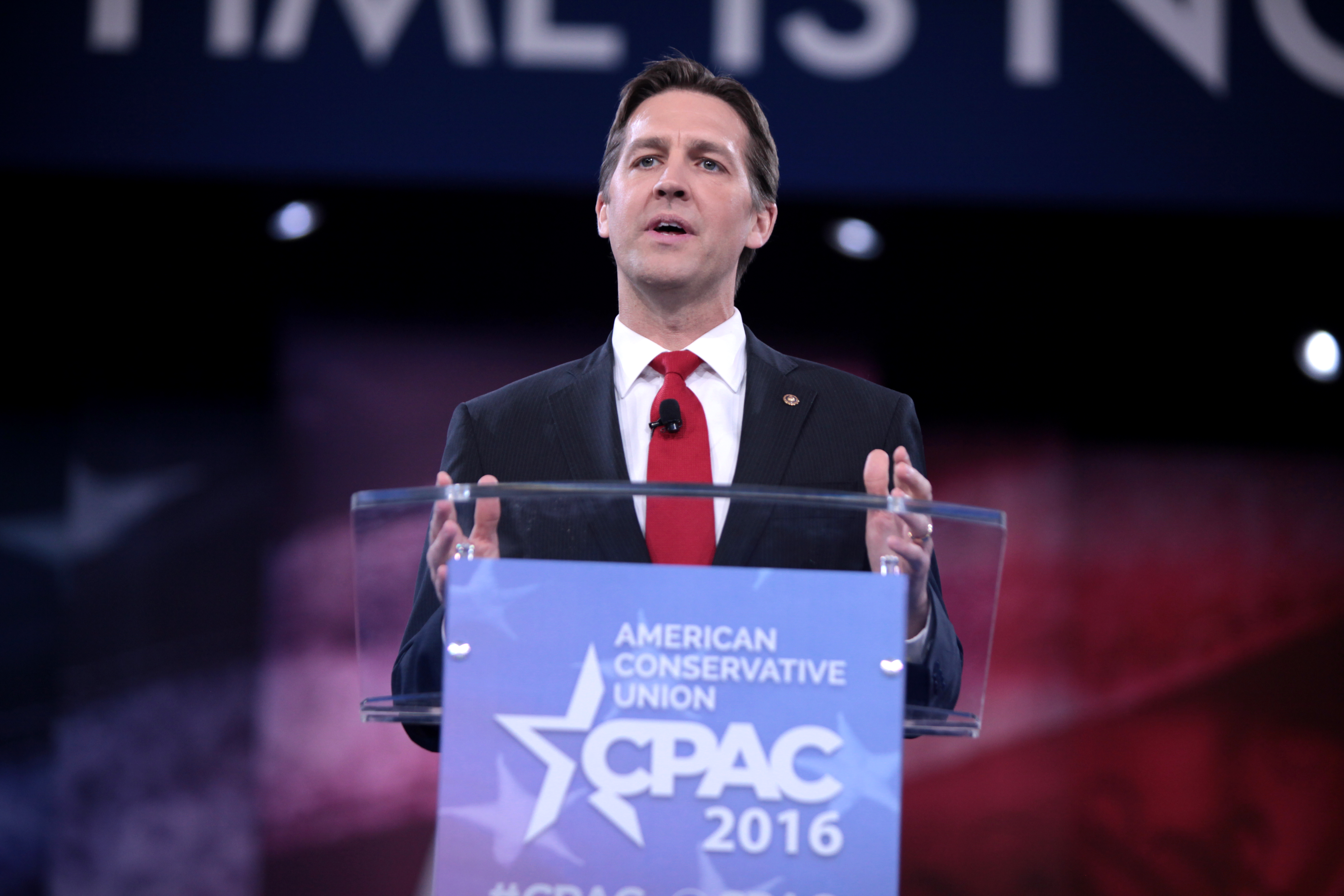
Sasse speaking at the 2016 Conservative Political Action Conference

In 2020, Sasse defeated Democrats Chris Janicek, who won the Democratic primary, and Preston Love Jr., who had the support of the state Democratic party. Sasse received 62.7% of the vote.

=== Tenure ===
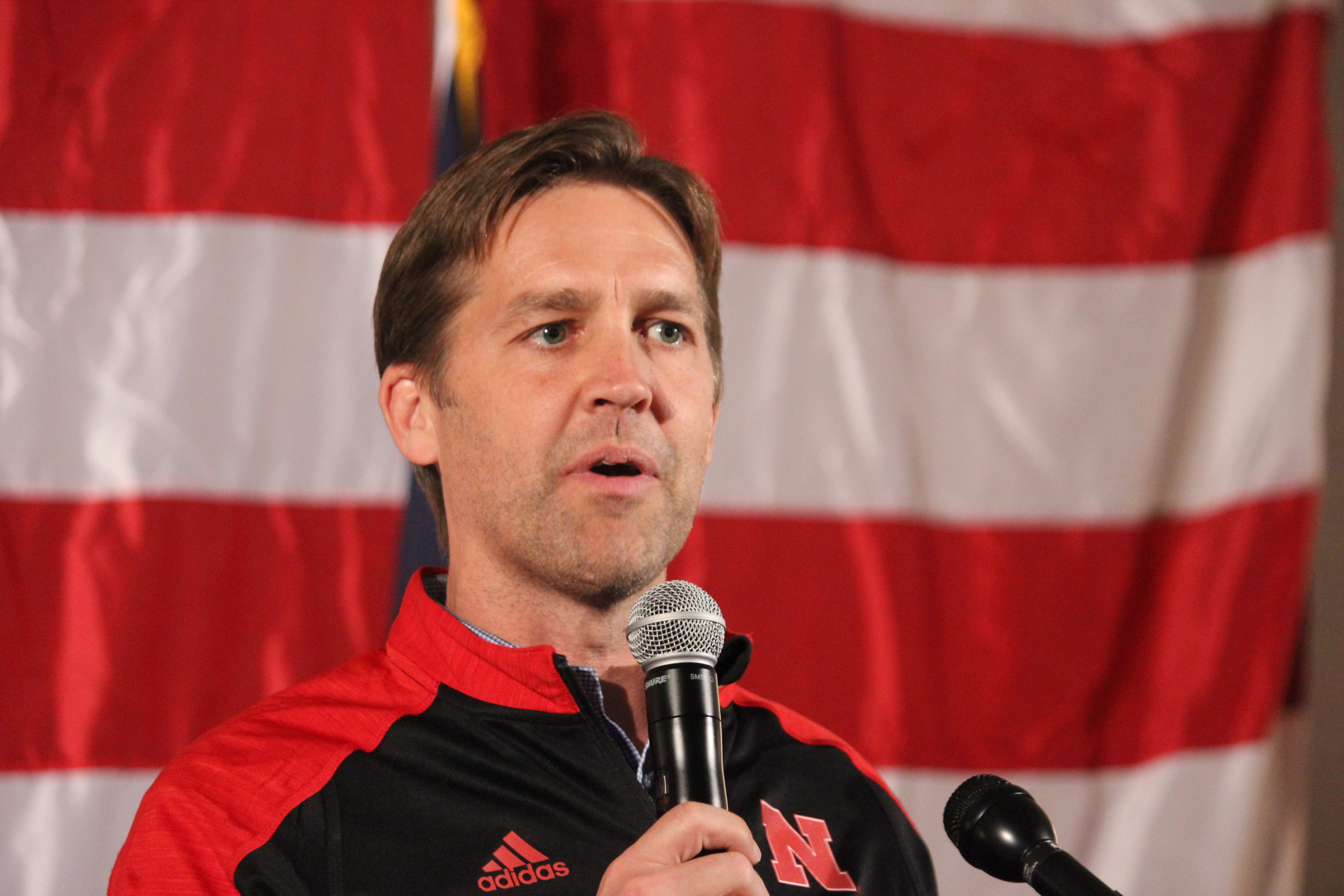
Sasse at a 2018 election night victory party for Governor Pete Ricketts

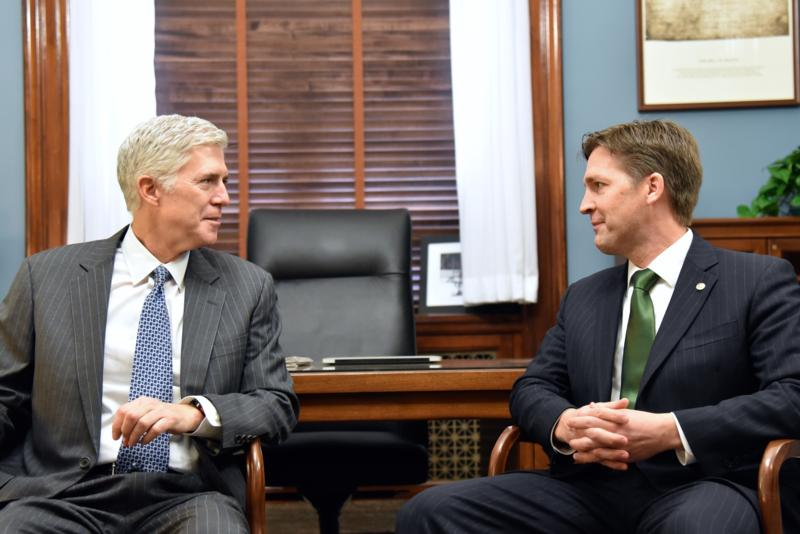
Sasse with Supreme Court Justice nominee Neil Gorsuch in 2017

Sasse was sworn in as a member of the U.S. Senate on January 6, 2015.

In February 2019, Sasse was one of 16 senators to vote against legislation preventing a partial government shutdown and containing $1.375 billion for barriers along the U.S.–Mexico border that included 55 miles of fencing.

In March 2019, Sasse was one of 12 senators to cosponsor a resolution that would impose a constitutional amendment limiting the Supreme Court to nine justices. The resolution was introduced after multiple Democratic presidential candidates expressed openness to increasing the number of seats on the Supreme Court.

On February 5, 2020, Sasse joined almost all Republican senators in voting to acquit Trump on both articles of impeachment during Trump's first impeachment trial.

Sasse was participating in the January 6, 2021 certification of the 2021 United States Electoral College vote count when Donald Trump supporters stormed the U.S. Capitol. In response, Sasse held Trump responsible for the storming of the Capitol, asserting that Trump "delighted" in the attack and was a "broken man". Sasse voted to certify Arizona's and Pennsylvania's electoral votes in the 2020 presidential election. After the House of Representatives voted to impeach Trump for the second time, Sasse joined six other Republican senators in voting to convict Trump on February 13, 2021.

Sasse resigned from the United States Senate on January 8, 2023, to become president of the University of Florida.

=== Committees ===
Sasse served on the following committees in the 117th Congress:

- Committee on Finance
  - Subcommittee on International Trade, Customs and Global Competitiveness
  - Subcommittee on Social Security, Pensions and Family Policy
  - Subcommittee on Taxation and IRS Oversight
- Select Committee on Intelligence
- Committee on the Budget
- Committee on the Judiciary
  - Subcommittee on Federal Courts, Oversight, Agency Action and Federal Rights
  - Subcommittee on Human Rights and the Law
  - Subcommittee on Privacy, Technology and the Law (Ranking Member)
  - Subcommittee on the Constitution

== University of Florida ==
In autumn 2022, the University of Florida Board of Trustees and the Florida Board of Governors selected Sasse as the 13th president of the University of Florida. He was the sole finalist out of 12 interviewed candidates for this position. Sasse assumed the presidency of the University of Florida on February 6, 2023. He succeeded Kent Fuchs as president.

Sasse's appointment generated some controversy on campus, with Sasse's past comments on same-sex marriage leading to student protests. The university's Faculty Senate also passed a no-confidence resolution expressing concern for the lack of transparency surrounding Sasse's selection.

On July 18, 2024, Sasse announced that he would be resigning from his position at the university effective July 31. He cited his wife Melissa's "recent epilepsy diagnosis and a new batch of memory issues" as reasons for his resignation. The University of Florida stated that it would continue to pay his $1 million annual salary through February 2028.

During his presidency, Sasse tripled the budget of his office to $17.3 million, $7.2 million of which was directed to consulting contracts. The president's staff increased from under 10 people to 30. The new hires included former Senate staffers and other Republican officials, many of whom worked outside Florida, resulting in increased travel costs. Sasse's office spent $1.3 million on catering at dinners and social functions, double the rate spent by his predecessor. The most expensive event was $177,000 on catering and drinks for a 200-person holiday party. An audit conducted by the Florida Auditor General found Sasse inappropriately spent university funds, including by paying above-market-rate salaries to his former congressional staffers who were not competitively hired and by chartering private jet flights without clear business purposes.

After stepping down as president, Sasse continued to teach classes at the university's Hamilton Center, a "GOP-mandated civic program devoted to research and teaching about Western civilization and the principles of a free society" according to The Independent Florida Alligator.

== Political positions ==
Sasse is considered politically conservative.

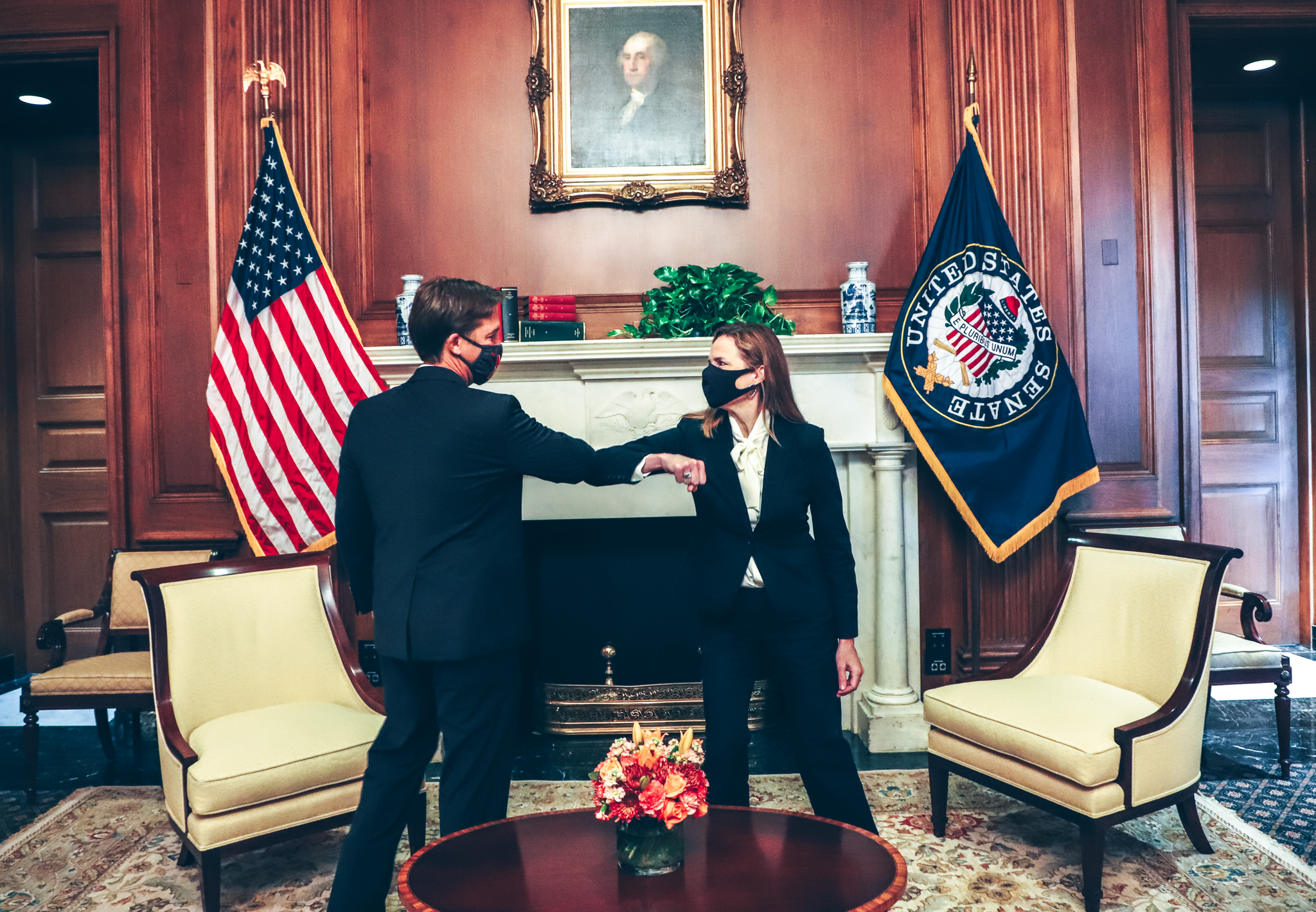
Sasse meets with Supreme Court nominee Amy Coney Barrett in October 2020

=== Abortion ===
In 2019, Sasse introduced the Born-Alive Abortion Survivors Protection Act, which would have penalized health-care practitioners who fail to provide care for an infant that is born alive from an abortion attempt.

=== Congressional term limits ===
Sasse pledged to support a constitutional amendment setting term limits on the terms in office for U.S. senators and representatives. In the 117th Congress, he cosponsored a bill for a constitutional amendment that would limit senators to two terms and representatives to three.

Sasse has proposed repealing the Seventeenth Amendment to the United States Constitution. Repealing that amendment would give state legislatures the power to select senators, eliminating the requirement that senators be elected by popular vote.

=== Criminal justice ===
Sasse voted against the bipartisan criminal justice reform legislation, FIRST STEP Act. The bill passed 87–12 on December 18, 2018.

=== Donald Trump ===
Sasse is known as a prominent Republican critic of Donald Trump.

In early 2016, during both major parties' presidential primary election seasons, Sasse announced that he would not support Trump should Trump become the party's nominee; he was the first sitting senator to make such an announcement. Sasse questioned Trump's commitment to the U.S. Constitution, in particular accusing him of attacking the First Amendment; stated that Trump had refused to condemn the Ku Klux Klan; and suggested that Trump "thinks he's running for King". He stated that if Trump won the party's nomination, he would vote neither for him nor for Hillary Clinton, but would probably "look for some third candidate—a conservative option, a Constitutionalist". Sasse suggested that he might leave the Republican Party, saying, "if the Republican Party becomes the party of David Duke, Donald Trump, I'm out".

Asked about Sasse's third-party suggestion, Trump replied, "That would be the work of a loser." Several Nebraska Republican politicians, among them State Senators Bob Krist and Beau McCoy and U.S. Senator Deb Fischer, took exception to Sasse's statements. Krist called them "very immature" and said that Sasse should "quietly and in a statesmanlike manner allow the system to work out and provide the leadership that needs to be provided"; Fischer said that voting for a third-party alternative would produce a Clinton victory. Krist later switched his registration to the Democratic Party, running as its candidate in the 2018 Nebraska gubernatorial election.

In September 2017, Sasse said he thought about leaving the GOP "every morning" and said he thought of himself as "an independent conservative who caucuses with the Republicans". Sasse has called Trump a "megalomaniac strongman", has "called the president's tariffs on steel and aluminum imports 'dumb'", and "has described Trump's escalating trade war with China [as] 'nuts'".

In March 2018, Sasse criticized Trump for congratulating Vladimir Putin on his election victory, saying, "The president of the United States was wrong to congratulate him, and the White House press secretary was wrong to duck a simple question about whether or not Putin's reelection was free and fair. It was not. The American people know that, the Russian people know that, and the world knows that. The White House refused to speak directly and clearly about this matter; we were weakened as a nation, and a tyrant was strengthened."

In July 2018, Politico reported that Sasse had "quietly launched a new political non-profit group, fueling speculation that he might launch a Hail Mary bid for president rather than seek another term in the Senate". But Politico also reported that Sasse and Trump were talking multiple times each month.

In January 2019, Sasse was one of 11 Republican senators to vote to advance legislation intended to block Trump's intent to lift sanctions against three Russian companies.

Sasse has been criticized for lambasting Trump but voting in line with his positions. Dick Polman of WHYY criticized Sasse as "all talk, no action", saying that Sasse and other Republicans in Congress "continue to abet and excuse Donald Trump's relentless assaults on democratic norms and the rule of law". Jennifer Rubin, in The Washington Post, wrote that Sasse and Republicans "now face voters increasingly upset about corruption and abuse of power, both of which will not abate so long as spineless Republicans hold the majority in both houses".

Sasse voted to acquit Trump in his first impeachment trial in the Senate over his request of Ukrainian president Volodymyr Zelenskyy that he start an investigation into political rival Joe Biden. Sasse said, "It's clear that the president had mixed motives in his decision to temporarily withhold military aid from Ukraine. The line between personal and public was not firmly safeguarded." He added that removing Trump from office would be bad for the country in the long term and that "removal is the wrong decision". During the impeachment trial, Sasse voted not to call witnesses to testify.

In August 2020, Sasse again came into conflict with Trump when Sasse referred to Trump's executive order authorizing stimulus after Congress failed to agree on a second COVID-19 relief package as "unconstitutional slop". Trump responded by calling Sasse a RINO (Republican In Name Only) and saying that Sasse had "gone rogue".

In an October 2020 campaign town hall event, Sasse remained critical of Trump: "He mocks evangelicals behind closed doors. His family has treated the presidency like a business opportunity. He's flirted with white supremacists." He added, "The United States now regularly sells out our allies under his leadership" and criticized Trump for "the way he treats women". Sasse expressed concern that Trump's "stupid political obsessions" and "rage tweeting" alienate voters.

In December 2020, when Trump pardoned many people connected to himself, Sasse said, "This is rotten to the core."

Sasse acknowledged Joe Biden's win in the 2020 presidential election and condemned Trump's efforts to overturn the election results. He was the first Republican to criticize Senator Josh Hawley's plan to challenge the results during Congress's count of the electoral votes on January 6, 2021, saying such an action would "disenfranchise millions of Americans" and that it would "point a loaded gun at the heart of legitimate self-government".

Sasse was participating in the January 6, 2021, certification of the 2021 United States Electoral College vote count when Donald Trump supporters stormed the U.S. Capitol. In response, Sasse held Trump responsible for the storming of the Capitol, asserting that Trump "delighted" in the attack and was a "broken man".

Sasse voted to certify Arizona's and Pennsylvania's electoral votes in the 2020 presidential election.

Sasse was the first Republican senator to publicly support the second impeachment of Donald Trump. He stated that he was willing to consider articles of impeachment because Trump had violated his oath of office in relation to the January 6 United States Capitol attack. After the House of Representatives voted to impeach Trump for the second time, Sasse joined six other Republican senators in voting to convict Trump on February 13, 2021. On May 27, 2021, along with five other Republicans and all present Democrats, he voted to establish a bipartisan commission to investigate the January 6 Capitol attack. The vote failed for lack of 60 required "yes" votes.

In February 2021, the Lincoln County Republican Party censured Sasse for his comments about Trump's impeachment. The county chair lamented that state law did not allow Sasse to be recalled. When the Nebraska Republican Party considered censuring Sasse for his lack of support for Trump, Sasse responded, "Politics isn't about the weird worship of one dude."

According to FiveThirtyEight, Sasse voted in line with Trump's position 84.8% of the time, less than the majority of his Senate Republican colleagues.

=== Environment ===
Sasse has criticized what he calls "alarmism" over climate change and has said, "you don't hear a lot of people who put climate as a No. 1 issue... offering constructive, innovative solutions for the future". He has said that "innovation" is the solution to climate change.

=== Guns ===
Sasse has said he could support "red flag" gun legislation only if it protects the constitutional rights of gun owners, doesn't take away guns without due process, and is limited to people who are convicted of domestic violence or other crimes.

=== Health care ===
In announcing his Senate candidacy, Sasse expressed strong opposition to the Affordable Care Act (ACA), calling himself "the anti-Obamacare candidate" and declaring that "If it lives, America as we know it will die." In the Senate, Sasse continued to support repeal of the ACA. In 2017, with Republicans unable to develop a repeal-and-replace plan that could secure a majority in the Senate, Sasse proposed an immediate repeal with a one-year delay in implementation, and called on the Senate to give up its August recess to allow it to work on a replacement measure.

In 2016, Sasse was the only senator from either party to vote against the Comprehensive Addiction and Recovery Act, which was intended to address abuse of heroin and opioid drugs by providing funds to the states for treatment and prevention programs and by making the anti-overdose drug naloxone more widely available to first responders and law enforcement agencies. Sasse said he was "distressed by opioid abuse" but questioned whether drug treatment should be addressed at the federal level.

=== LGBT+ rights ===
Sasse does not support same-sex marriage. After the United States Supreme Court ruled that it was unconstitutional for a state to ban same-sex marriage in Obergefell v. Hodges, Sasse said, "Today's ruling is a disappointment to Nebraskans who understand that marriage brings a wife and husband together so their children can have a mom and dad. The Supreme Court once again overstepped its Constitutional role by acting as a super-legislature and imposing its own definition of marriage on the American people rather than allowing voters to decide in the states." In November 2022, he abstained from voting on the Respect for Marriage Act which codified same-sex marriage rights into federal law.

=== Foreign policy ===
==== China ====
Huawei's CFO Meng Wanzhou, daughter of the company's founder Ren Zhengfei, was arrested in Canada on December 1, 2018, at the request of U.S. authorities. Sasse said that China is undermining U.S. national security interests, often "using private sector entities", and "Americans are grateful that our Canadian partners have arrested the chief financial officer."

In May 2020, Sasse delivered a graduation speech to the graduating class of 2020 at Fremont High School in Nebraska, his high school alma mater, in which he criticized China over the COVID-19 pandemic. The local newspaper Omaha World-Herald reported that his remarks drew criticism from Sasse's Democratic opponent and a board member of Fremont High School who endorsed Sasse's Democratic opponent. The public school board also issued an official statement and disavowed its responsibility for Sasse's comments. A spokesperson for Sasse defended the remarks, reiterating Sasse's criticisms and saying that students were mature enough to hear the truth.

==== Ukraine ====
After the 2022 Russian invasion of Ukraine, Sasse spoke in favor of expanding American military assistance to Ukraine, saying, "If [Ukraine] can shoot it, we should ship it."

Sasse, who served on the Senate Select Committee on Intelligence, has criticized what he considered unnecessary roadblocks in supplying actionable intelligence to the Armed Forces of Ukraine, saying, "There are a bunch of technicalities about intelligence in general versus targeting information in particular. And we should be giving the Ukrainians all the intelligence we can possibly get them as fast as possible. It's way too lawyerly. We have a very limited window here."

Sasse does not support direct U.S. military intervention in the conflict, saying, "We don't need to have fighter pilots in the air, we don't need to have boots on the ground inside Ukraine, because Ukrainians have the will to fight. We need to have the will to rearm them constantly."

== Books ==
Sasse is the author of The Vanishing American Adult (2017) and Them: Why We Hate Each Other – and How to Heal (2018) ISBN 978-1-25019368-1. He also co-edited the book Here We Stand!: A Call from Confessing Evangelicals for a Modern Reformation with theologian James Montgomery Boice.

== Personal life ==
Sasse was raised a Lutheran and baptized in the Lutheran Church–Missouri Synod. As an undergraduate in the early 1990s, he encountered the teachings of W. Robert Godfrey at the Bolton Conference. Sasse identifies this as the time when he and his wife first began to embrace Reformed Christianity. He later became an elder in the United Reformed Churches in North America and served on the board of trustees for Westminster Seminary California. He has been a member of Grace Church, a Presbyterian Church in America (PCA) congregation in Fremont, Nebraska.

Sasse and his wife, Melissa, have three children. They currently reside in Austin, Texas.

Ben and Melissa Sasse, along with their third child, Breck Sasse, lived in the Dasburg House on the University of Florida campus during Sasse's tenure at the university. Previously, the Sasses lived in Fremont, Nebraska, with their three children. Their children were homeschooled.

=== Illness ===
External videos
- "Former Sen. Ben Sasse on Terminal Cancer Diagnosis, Politics and Society", February 9, 2026, C-SPAN
- "Former Sen. Ben Sasse on Terminal Diagnosis in NY Times Interview", April 19, 2026, C-SPAN

On December 23, 2025, Sasse announced that he had been diagnosed with terminal "stage-four pancreatic cancer". In April 2026, during an interview with The New York Times, Sasse revealed that his cancer had spread to his liver, lymph nodes, lung and vascular system. Due to receiving the cancer treatment daraxonrasib, he had visible facial scarring. However, he also stated that the drug has helped shrink his tumors by 80%.

== Electoral history ==
2014 United States Senate election in Nebraska
Primary election
Party	Candidate	Votes	%
Republican	Ben Sasse	110,802	49.29
Republican	Sid Dinsdale	50,494	22.46
Republican	Shane Osborn	47,338	21.06
Republican	Bart McLeay	12,840	5.71
Republican	Clifton R. Johnson	3,310	1.47
Total votes		224,784	100.00
General election
Republican	Ben Sasse	347,636	64.34
Democratic	Dave Domina	170,127	31.49
Independent	Jim Jenkins	15,868	2.94
Independent	Todd F. Watson	6,260	1.16
Write-in		446	0.08
Total votes		540,337	100.00
Republican hold			

2020 United States Senate election in Nebraska
Primary election
Party	Candidate	Votes	%
Republican	Ben Sasse (incumbent)	215,207	75.21
Republican	Matt Innis	70,921	24.79
Total votes		286,128	100.00
General election
Republican	Ben Sasse (incumbent)	583,507	62.74
Democratic	Chris Janicek	227,191	24.43
Write-in	Preston Love Jr.	58,411	6.28
Libertarian	Gene Siadek	55,115	5.93
Write-in		5,788	0.62
Total votes		930,012	100.00
Republican hold			

Government offices
Preceded by Michael O'Grady	Assistant Secretary of Health and Human Services for Planning and Evaluation; 2007–2009	Succeeded by Sherry Glied
Academic offices
Preceded by Stephen Fritz	President of Midland University; 2010–2014	Succeeded by Jody Horner
Preceded by Kent Fuchs	President of the University of Florida; 2023–2024	Succeeded by Kent Fuchs; Acting
Party political offices
Preceded by Mike Johanns	Republican nominee for U.S. Senator from Nebraska (Class 2); 2014, 2020	Succeeded by Pete Ricketts
U.S. Senate
Preceded by Mike Johanns	U.S. Senator (Class 2) from Nebraska; 2015–2023; Served alongside: Deb Fischer	Succeeded by Pete Ricketts
U.S. order of precedence (ceremonial)
Preceded by Dean Heller as Former U.S. Senator	Order of precedence of the United States as Former U.S. Senator	Succeeded by Robert Torricelli as Former U.S. Senator
