= Sid Dinsdale =

American banker (born 1952)

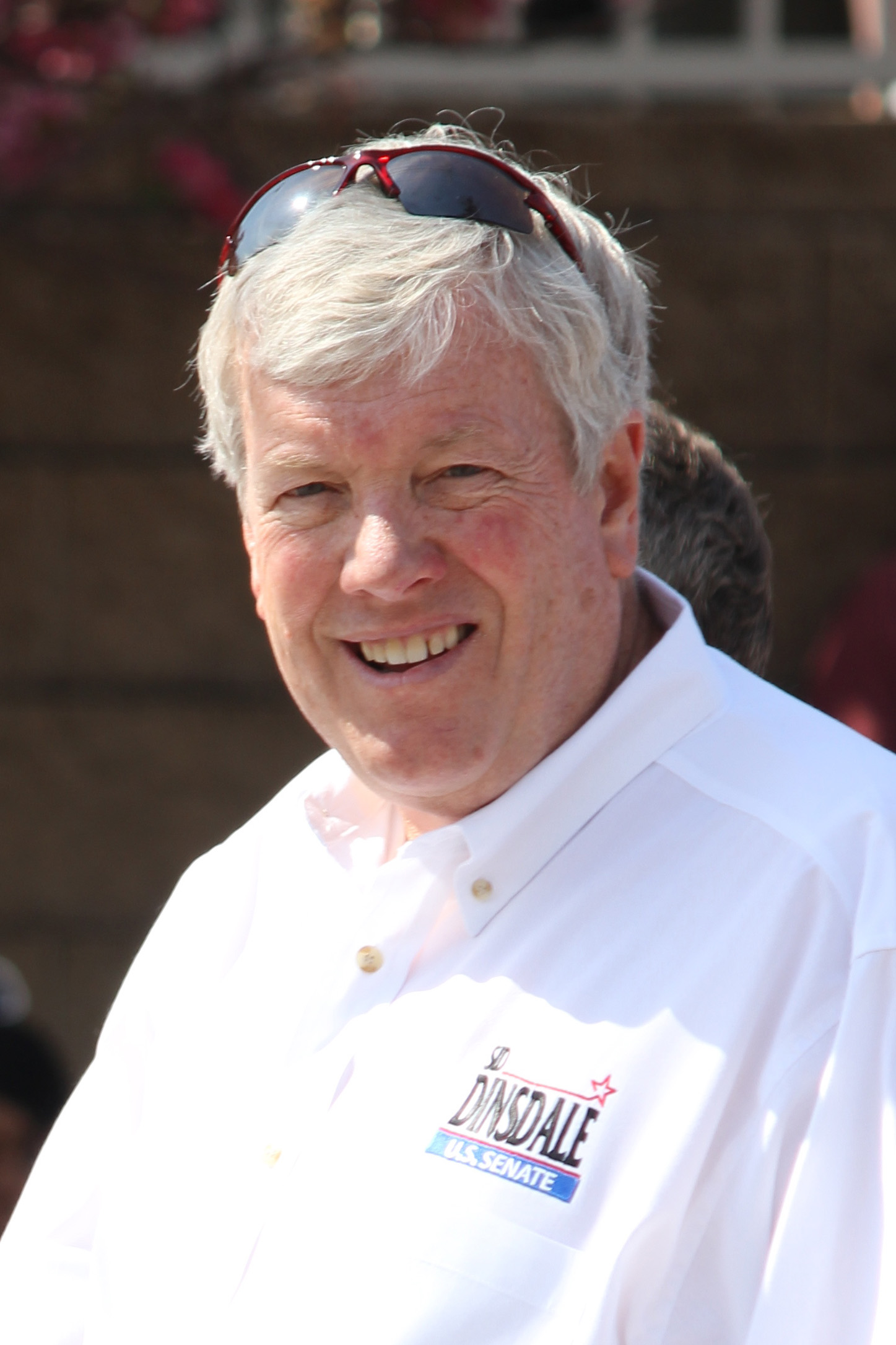

Chairman and President, Pinnacle Bancorp, Inc.

Personal details
- Born: John Sidney Dinsdale; July 26, 1952 (age 74) Palmer, Nebraska
- Party: Republican
- Children: 3
- Education: University of Nebraska–Lincoln (BS)
- Website: sidforsenate.com

John Sidney "Sid" Dinsdale (born July 26, 1952) is an American banker. The president of Pinnacle Bancorp, Inc., which has 130 banking locations in eight states and assets of $7.6 billion, Dinsdale was a Republican candidate for U.S. Senate in Nebraska in 2014.

== Life and career ==
Dinsdale was born in Palmer, Nebraska. Dinsdale graduated from Palmer High School and attended Hastings College. Dinsdale transferred to the University of Nebraska–Lincoln, graduating with a degree in finance. He graduated from the Graduate School of Banking at Colorado. In 2013, Dinsdale completed the President's Program in Leadership at Harvard Business School.

In 1994, he was named president of his family's banking company, Pinnacle Bancorp, Inc. Dinsdale sits on the boards of directors of Ameritas Life Insurance Company, the Nebraska Methodist Health System, the University of Nebraska Foundation, and the STRATCOM Consultation Committee at Offutt Air Force Base in Bellevue, Nebraska.

== U. S. Senate campaign ==
On September 16, 2013, Dinsdale became the fourth Republican candidate vying for Nebraska's U.S. Senate seat being vacated by the retirement of Senator Mike Johanns.

Dinsdale lost the primary to Ben Sasse who went on to win the US Senate seat in the November 2014 election.

== Philanthropy ==
- Omaha Salvation Army, chairman, D.J. Hero's luncheon
- Midlands Community Hospital, board of directors
- Omaha Children's Hospital, board of directors
- TeamMates Mentoring, honorary chair with his wife of events in 2013
- Team Jack Foundation, Teammate of the Year 2013, pediatric brain cancer awareness
- The Hope Center for Kids, honorary chair with his wife of the 2013 Gala
- Elkhorn Public Schools Foundation, president

== Honors and awards ==
- Midlands Community Foundation Reflection Award

== Articles ==
- "Omaha Banker Sid Dinsdale Enters the U.S. Senate Race," Omaha World-Herald, Robynn Tysver, Sept. 16, 2013
- "Palmer Native Launches Senate Bid," Grand Island Independent, Sarah Schulz, Sept. 16, 2013
