= Richard G. Frank =

American academic

Richard Frank

Assistant Secretary of Health and Human Services for Planning and Evaluation
- In office 2014–2016
- President: Barack Obama
- Preceded by: Sherry Glied
- Succeeded by: Stephen T. Parente

Personal details
- Born: Richard Gabriel Frank
- Education: Bard College (BA); Boston University (PhD)

Richard G. Frank is an American healthcare economist and academic working as the Margaret T. Morris Professor of Health Economics in the Department of Health Care Policy at Harvard Medical School. He was previously assistant secretary of health and human services for planning and evaluation from 2014 to 2016.

== Education ==
Frank earned a Bachelor of Arts degree in economics from Bard College and a PhD in economics from Boston University.

== Career ==
Prior to assuming his position at Harvard Medical School, Frank was the deputy assistant secretary for planning and evaluation at the United States Department of Health and Human Services, responsible for managing the Office of Disability, Aging and Long-Term Care Policy. From 2013 to 2014, he was a special advisor to the secretary of health and human services, Kathleen Sebelius. Frank was appointed to as assistant secretary of health and human services for planning and evaluation in 2014, succeeding Sherry Glied. He also worked as the editor of the Journal of Health Economics from 2005 to 2014.
