= New York City Conflicts of Interest Board =

Government agency

The Conflicts of Interest Board (NYC COIB) is the independent New York City agency tasked with administering, enforcing and interpreting Chapter 68 of the New York City Charter, the city's Conflicts of Interest Law, and the city's Annual Disclosure Law. The Board is an enforcement agency that governs the ethical conduct of public employees. The agency has made news for its active Twitter feed, encouraging those within its jurisdiction to contact the agency via memes.

From 2014 to 2020, Columbia Law School professor Richard Briffault served as chairman of the board. Mayor Bill de Blasio nominated Briffault for the post. Briffault said in 2022: “The essence of [the Board] is making sure that public servants are serving the public and not serving their own interests or serving the interests of people associated with them. appearances also matter, in terms of public confidence in the integrity of their officials.”
