= The Vanishing American Adult =

2017 book by Ben Sasse

- First edition
- Author: Ben Sasse
- Language: English
- Genre: Non-fiction
- Publisher: St. Martin's Press
- Publication date: 2017
- Publication place: United States

The Vanishing American Adult is a 2017 book by United States Senator Ben Sasse published by St. Martin's Press.

In the book, Sasse describes Americans as “a drifting and aimless people — awash in material goods and yet spiritually aching for meaning.” He calls on parents to take control of their children's education and argues that children need to learn to work hard, resist consumerism, read widely, and live for a while in a place different from their home, although it need not be far from home.

== Reception ==
In The Atlantic, Emma Green describes The Vanishing American Adult as a "serious new book" arguing that, "Americans have lost their sense of personal integrity and discipline. For the country to deal with the troubles ahead—including automation, political disengagement, and the rise of nativist, huckster politicians, he says—people must recover their sense of virtue. The republic depends on it."

In National Review, Michael Shindler argues that the book perpetuates a "secularized creed of puritan industriousness" and claims that Sasse’s injunction to "Work first, play later; and limit your play as much as necessary to get back to bed to be able to work first thing again tomorrow" is indicative of an "austere economic theology" in which "labor itself is alienated from its fruits and is extolled as a means to edify individuals and improve society."

In The Objective Standard, Ryan Puzycki gives the book a mostly positive review, noting that, "Sasse sprinkles his writing with some predictable tropes and mistakes," such as his "egregious…omission of Lockean ideas from…his discussion of the Enlightenment and America's founding." Nevertheless, he concludes that, "Despite these flaws, this is a strong book that proves Sasse is one of the more thoughtful and intellectual elected officials."
