= Assistant Secretary of Health and Human Services for Planning and Evaluation =

U.S. government advisory group

Assistant Secretary for Planning and Evaluation

Agency overview
- Formed: 1965
- Preceding agency: Office of the Assistant Secretary for Program Coordination
- Jurisdiction: Federal government of the United States
- Headquarters: Hubert H. Humphrey Building Washington, D.C. 38°53′12″N 77°00′52″W
- Employees: 144
- Annual budget: US$56.3 million (2014 FY request)
- Agency executives: Vacant, Assistant Secretary for Planning and Evaluation; Vacant, Principal Deputy Assistant Secretary for Planning and Evaluation
- Parent agency: United States Department of Health and Human Services
- Website: http://aspe.hhs.gov

The Office of the Assistant Secretary for Planning and Evaluation (ASPE) is the principal advisory group to the U.S. Secretary of the Department of Health and Human Services (HHS) on policy development and provides coordination and support for HHS's strategic and policy planning, planning and development of legislation, program evaluation, data gathering, policy-related research, and regulatory program.

ASPE refers both to the position, the Assistant Secretary for Planning and Evaluation, and the office directed by that position. Since its authorization in 1965, ASPE has played an instrumental role as an internal strategy group, think tank, and incubator supporting the priorities and needs of the Secretary, and consequently, the Department as a whole.

As part of the announced 2025 HHS reorganization, the office is planned to be integrated into the new HHS Office of Strategy.

== Mission ==
The Office of the Assistant Secretary for Planning and Evaluation (ASPE) is the principal advisory group to the Secretary of the HHS on policy development and provides coordination and support for HHS's strategic and policy planning, planning and development of legislation, program evaluation, data gathering, policy-related research, and regulatory program.

ASPE advises the Secretary on policy issues associated with health, human services, disabilities, aging, long-term care, science policy, data resources, and other matters, such as economic policy. ASPE leads special initiatives on behalf of the Secretary; provides direction for, and coordinates, HHS policy research, evaluation and data gathering and related analyses; and manages cross-Department activities, such as strategic and legislation planning. Integral to this role, ASPE develops policy analyses—both short and long-term—and related initiatives, conducts policy research and evaluation studies, and reviews and estimates the costs and benefits of policies (including regulations) and programs under consideration by HHS, Congress and others. ASPE works with other HHS Assistant Secretaries and agency heads on these matters.

== Activities ==
=== Primary activities ===
1. Research and Evaluation – ASPE's policy research and evaluation program has a significant impact on the improvement of policies, programs and services of HHS, by systematically collecting information on program performance, assessing program effectiveness, improving performance measurement, performing environmental scans and assessments, and providing program management.
2. Data Collection Coordination – ASPE leads the planning and coordination of data collection investments and statistical policy across HHS and co-chairs the HHS Data Council, which promotes communication and planning for data collection from an HHS-wide perspective, assures coordination and cost efficiencies in addressing interagency data needs, and serves as a forum to address priority interagency, Departmental, and national data needs in a coordinated fashion.
3. Research Coordination – ASPE also has the lead role in ensuring that HHS’ investment in health and human services research supports the Secretary's Strategic Initiatives and Departmental priorities in the most efficient and effective manner.

=== Affordable Care Act-related activities ===
ASPE undertakes a variety of policy development, research, analysis, evaluation and data development activities in support of ACA implementation including:

1. Internal policy development, data development and technical assistance projects. Source of information and data to other parts of the Federal government and improve data to track changes as the ACA is implemented.
2. Actuarial analysis and modeling to support the development of policy alternatives relating to ACA provisions regarding coverage, affordability, and market reforms.
3. Review, study, and evaluation to identify effective prevention strategies and associated benefits, especially in the area of community-based and clinical preventive service integration.
4. Development of data and analytic capability to support outreach and enrollment activities for Medicaid and Exchange coverage expansion.

• Modeling and evaluation support for the CMS Innovation Center including post acute care payment activities. • Evaluation of the overall impact of Medicaid expansions on vulnerable populations and of specific new Medicaid options that enable states to serve individuals with multiple chronic conditions and needs for functional assistance.

=== Grants ===
ASPE Grant Awards Table

| Description | FY 2012 | FY 2013 | FY2014 |
| Number of Awards | 4 | 4 | 4 |
| Average Award | $750,000 | $750,000 | $750,000 |

ASPE maintains a grants program to support research and evaluation by academically based research centers of important and emerging social policy issues associated with income dynamics, poverty, transitions from welfare to work, child well-being, and special populations. Federal support for the poverty center program has been continuous since 1968. Beginning in FY 2012, ASPE reduced the number of grants from five to four while essentially maintaining total support for the research center program in an effort to ensure that each center received sufficient funding to carry out a robust research agenda.

ASPE's grants for academic research institutes range from $700,000 to $800,000 per year. The poverty center program conducts a broad range of research to describe and analyze national, regional and state environments (e.g., economics, demographics) and policies affecting the poor, particularly families with children who are poor or at-risk of being poor. It also focuses on expanding our understanding of the causes, consequences and effects of poverty in local geographic areas, especially in states or regional areas of high concentrations of poverty, and on improving our understanding of how family structure and function affect the health and well-being of children, adults, families and communities. All of the centers develop and mentor social science researchers whose work focuses on these issues.

== Organization ==
ASPE consists of several organizational components: the Immediate Office; Office of Health Policy; Office of Human Services Policy; Office of Disability, Aging and Long-Term Care Policy; and Office of Science and Data Policy.

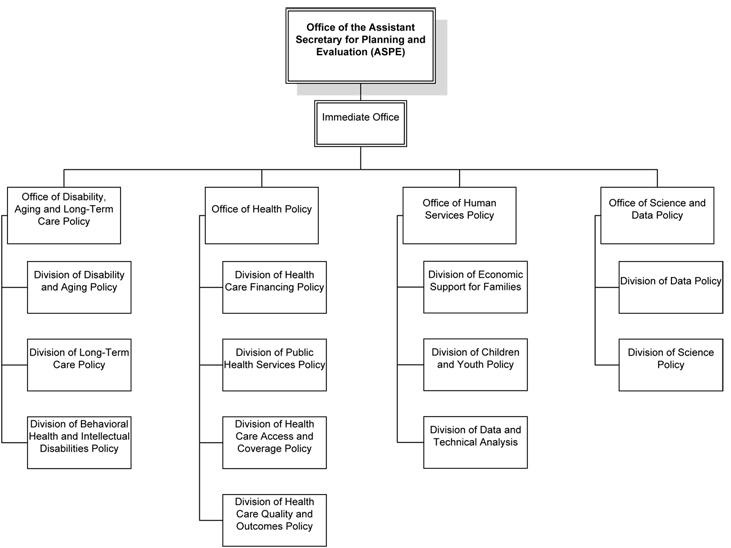
Organizational Chart

=== Immediate office ===
The ASPE Immediate Office (IO) provides executive direction, leadership, guidance and support to ASPE components. The IO develops and guides implementation of HHS's strategic plan, the development of HHS legislative and regulatory agenda in coordination with the Office of the Assistant Secretary for Legislation and the Office of the Executive Secretary, respectively, and the planning and coordination of policy-related research and evaluation across HHS. The IO manages planning and implementation of ASPE budgets, evaluation and policy research agendas, workforce plans, executive correspondence, regulation review, and internal control procedures. The IO also provides information support services for ASPE and access by the public to information about ASPE and HHS evaluation and policy research studies.

The HHS Research Coordination Council, chaired by the ASPE, accomplishes research and evaluation planning and coordination for HHS. The Council is a planning and coordinating body of representatives from HHS operating divisions and other offices conducting research, with support within ASPE by a staff group drawn from ASPE offices.

=== Disability, aging and long-term care policy ===
==== Overview ====
The Office of Disability, Aging and Long-Term Care Policy (DALTCP) is responsible for the development, coordination, research and evaluation of HHS policies and programs that support the independence, productivity, health and well-being of children, working age adults, and older persons with disabilities. The office is also responsible for policy coordination and research to promote the economic and social well-being of older Americans. DALTCP coordinates its work with aging and disability-related agencies and programs throughout the government, including the Departments of Justice, Labor, Education, Transportation, Housing and Urban Development, the Social Security Administration and the Office of National Drug Control Policy.

==== Disability and aging ====
The Division of Disability and Aging Policy' is responsible for policy development, coordination, research and evaluation of policies and programs focusing on persons with disabilities and older Americans (Older Americans Act). Activities related to the Older Americans Act are carried out in coordination with the Administration on Community Living. This includes measuring and evaluating the impact of programs authorized by the Older Americans Act. The Division is also responsible for supporting the development and coordination of crosscutting disability and aging data and policies within the Department and other federal agencies. Areas of focus include assessing the interaction between the health, disability, and economic well-being of persons of all ages with disabilities including the prevalence of disability and disabling conditions; describing the socio-demographic characteristics of relevant populations; determining service use, income, employment, and program participation patterns; and coordinating the development of disability and aging data and policies that affect the characteristics, circumstances and needs of older Americans and disabled populations. The Division's responsibilities include long-range planning, budget and economic analysis, program analysis, review of regulations and reports on legislation, review and conduct of research and evaluation activities, and information dissemination.

==== Long-term care ====
The Division of Long-Term Care Policy is responsible for coordination, development, research and evaluation of HHS policies and programs that address the long-term care and personal assistance needs of people of all ages with functional impairments and disabilities. The Division is the focal point for policy development and analysis related to the long-term care services components of the Affordable Care Act as well as Medicare, Medicaid, and including nursing facility services, community residential services, personal assistance services, home health and rehabilitation services, and the integration of acute, post-acute and long-term care services. The Division's responsibilities include long-range planning, budget and economic analysis, program analysis, review of regulations and reports on legislation, review and conduct of research and evaluation activities, and information dissemination.

==== Behavioral health and intellectual disabilities ====
The Division of Behavioral Health and Intellectual Disabilities Policy is responsible for analysis, coordination, research and evaluation of policies related to individuals with severe intellectual disabilities, severe addictions and/or severe and persistent mental illness. The Division's responsibilities include long-range planning, budget and economic analysis, data development and analysis, program analysis, review of regulations and reports on legislation, review and conduct of research and evaluation activities, and information dissemination. The Division is the focal point for policy development and analysis related to financing, access/delivery, organization and quality of intellectual disabilities and serious and persistent mental illnesses services, including those financed by Medicaid, Medicare, the Substance Abuse and Mental Health Services Administration (SAMHSA) Administration on Developmental Disabilities and the Health Resources and Services Administration (HRSA). The Division works closely with other offices in ASPE because the two vulnerable populations that are its focus are users of both human services and health services.

=== Health policy ===
==== Overview ====
The Office of Health Policy (HP) is responsible for policy development and coordination and for the conduct and coordination of research, evaluation, and data, on matters relating to health system, services, and financing. Functions include policy and long-range planning; policy, economic, program and budget analysis; review of regulations and development of legislation. Health policy matters include public health, health services and systems, health insurance, health care financing, health care quality, consumer health information in the public and private sectors, and the interaction among these matters and sectors.

HP is responsible for developing and coordinating a health policy research, information, and analytical program to gain information concerning health services, systems and financing, and for providing support to the ASPE Immediate Office for the Department's Research Coordination Council. The Office works closely with other ASPE and HHS offices on these matters, coordinates and shares information across Federal agencies, and collaborates with the health policy and service research community.

HP works closely with the Centers for Medicare and Medicaid Services, the Agency for Healthcare Research and Quality, the Health Resources and Services Administration, the Substance Abuse and Mental Health Services Administration, the Centers for Disease Control and Prevention, and other HHS agencies. Within ASPE, the office coordinates closely with Office of Disability, Aging and Long-Term Care Policy on matters concerning persons with disabilities and the elderly, in particular those related to the Medicare and Medicaid programs.

==== Health financing ====
The Division of Health Financing Policy is responsible for policies and functions of the office concerning health care financing and health care costs, principally Federal health care financing related to the Medicare program, including matters concerning structural changes and modernization for the long-term, such as drug benefits (Medicare Part D), coverage and eligibility, new technology, and payments for services.

==== Public health services ====
The Division of Public Health Services is responsible for the functions of the office related to public health care safety net programs and policies. The division conducts analyses and engages in strategic planning on topics such as the health center program, maternal health, health workforce, social determinants of health, HIV/AIDS treatment and prevention, health care delivery for American Indian and Alaska Native populations, rural health care, preventive services, health disparities, and health care data infrastructure, among other topics.

==== Health care for low income populations ====
The Division of Health Care for Low Income Populations focuses on the financing a delivery of health care services for the low-income population without private health insurance. The division is responsible for the functions of the office with respect to the Medicaid program, the State Children's Health Insurance Program (SCHIP), and other policies and programs to help low-income individuals and families have access to health care. This includes development of policies and mechanisms that integrate the financing and delivery of health care to this population. This division collaborates with Health Care Financing on issues effecting populations who are dually eligible for Medicare and Medicaid and other crosscutting areas.

==== Health care delivery systems ====
The Division of Health Care Delivery Systems is responsible for functions related to health services, health organizations and health care delivery systems. The division's focus includes consumer information such as patient's bill of rights, incentives for private health insurance and health care, matters concerning the Health Insurance Portability and Accountability Act (HIPAA), health care organization, and the interaction between public and private health care and insurance.

=== Human services policy ===
==== Overview ====
The Office of Human Services Policy (HSP) is responsible for policy development and coordination, and for the conduct and coordination of research, evaluation, and data on matters relating to poverty, cash and non-cash support for low-income working and non-working families, welfare-to-work strategies, and services for families, children, and youth. Functions include policy and long-range planning; policy, program, economic and budget analysis; review of regulations; and development of legislation. In particular, the office is responsible for policies concerning families, child and youth development, support for low-income families and their children, welfare, and the financing and delivery of human services. The office works closely with agencies that provide services to low-income populations, particularly the Administration for Children and Families (ACF).

==== Economic support for families ====
The Division of Economic Support for Families is responsible for functions of the office related to low-income populations. The division's principal areas of focus include: cash and non-cash assistance for working and non-working families, welfare-to-work strategies, cash and non-cash assistance for working and non-working families, welfare-to-work strategies, child support enforcement, and special populations (e.g., immigrants). The division also monitors, analyzes, and maintain liaison with programs and policies outside the Department that affect HHS issues, such as earned income tax credits, food stamps, housing assistance, and education and workforce development programs.

==== Children and youth ====
The Division of 'Children and Youth Policy' is responsible for functions of the office affecting children and youth. The principal areas of focus include: healthy development of children and youth, family support, human services for children, youth, and their families, such as child welfare and child protection, at-risk youth, child care and early childhood education, and violence prevention. It manages a 12-federal agency youth initiative and chairs the Interagency Working Group on Youth Programs.

==== Data and technical analysis ====
- The Division of Data and Technical Analysis is responsible for the development, analysis, and coordination of research, evaluation, and data gathering activities relating to policies and programs concerning the low-income population. The division provides support for policy development through data analysis, modeling, cost and impact analyses, and the enhancement of national, state, and local data sources for analyzing and tracking issues. The division also is responsible for the annual update of the HHS poverty guidelines. The division also maintains cognizance of data collection activities of the Federal statistical system and coordinates with the Office of Science and Data Policy, as appropriate.

=== Science and data policy ===
==== Overview ====
The Office of Science and Data Policy (SDP) is responsible for policy development, analysis and coordination and for the conduct and coordination of research, evaluation, analyses and data development on matters relating to science policy and data and statistical policy within HHS. Functions include policy, strategic and long-range planning; policy research, analysis and evaluation, economic, statistical, program and budget analysis; review of regulations; and development of legislative proposals in science policy and data policy.

SDP provides advice and analysis on science policy and data policy issues, coordinates science policy and data policy issues of inter-agency scope within HHS, and manages inter-agency initiatives in science policy and data policy. SDP also conducts a program of policy research, analysis and evaluation in science policy and data policy, provides leadership and staff to several White House, departmental and external advisory committees, and maintains liaison with other federal offices and HHS partners in the science policy and data policy communities.

==== Data ====
The Division of Data Policy is responsible for data policy development and coordination within the Department and serves as the focal point for Department-wide data and statistical policy. It provides leadership and staff support to the Department's Data Council, the principal internal forum and advisory body to the Secretary on data policy issues, and provides oversight for and serves as the Executive Director for the National Committee on Vital and Health Statistics, the statutory public advisory body to the Secretary on health data, statistics, privacy and health information policy. The Division also provides analytical support to the ASPE on a variety of Department-wide data policy issues and initiatives, including statistical policy, privacy, data planning, HHS data quality and peer review initiatives, HIPAA and HHS data collection strategy. It also carries out a program of policy research, evaluation and analysis in these areas and provides several cross-cutting data policy services across ASPE.

==== Science ====
The Division of Science Policy is responsible for functions of the office related to science policy, programs and issues and initiatives that are heavily science-oriented, including public health issues that involve complex or rapidly evolving science and technology issues. Areas include public health emergency preparedness, biomedical research policy, drug safety, food safety, pandemic preparedness, emerging infectious diseases, prescription drug issues, personalized health care advances and related topics. It works closely with and is responsible for analytical responsibilities relating to the HHS science agencies National Institutes of Health (NIH), Food and Drug Administration (FDA), and Centers for Disease Control and Prevention (CDC) and for cross-cutting issue areas. The Division fosters efforts across HHS toward ensuring that the science components of proposed regulations, legislation, plans, budgets and other policy initiatives are coordinated and meet high standards of science quality and integrity. It also conducts policy research, evaluation and analysis in these areas and maintains liaison with the White House Office of Science and Technology Policy and with other inter-agency science policy activities.

== History ==
=== Creation ===
ASPE was established in 1966, in the Office of the Secretary of Health, Education, and Welfare as the Office of the Assistant Secretary for Program Coordination. It was based on the Department of Defense “systems analysis” model following President Lyndon B. Johnson’s call for its government-wide introduction that emphasized a central planning staff independent of program functions, objective analysis based on research, and utilization of various systems analysis tools, such as multi-year plans and budgets.

ASPE had approximately 20 analysts for health, education, and welfare issues. It also had an office to help administer a program planning and budgeting system.

In 1967, an evaluation office was added to focus resources on assessing program performance, and the office was renamed the Office of the Assistant Secretary for Planning and Evaluation.

=== 1970s ===
In the 1970s, a significant research and technical support staff augmented ASPE and funding transferred from the disbanded Office of Economic Opportunity (OEO); ASPE assumed OEO's role in funding poverty research. It developed a significant econometric modeling capability to assess the fiscal impact of policy options, for example the Transfer Income Model (TRIM). ASPE also managed major health insurance and income maintenance experiments, and initiated long-term care demonstrations. Education policy, planning, and evaluation moved to its newly created agency, the Department of Education.

=== 1980s ===
In the 1980s, ASPE continued to focus on many significant policy research and analysis activities across HHS programs including: block grant programs, competition-based health care reform, regulatory reform, service delivery experiments, and an outcome-focused strategic planning system.

=== 1990s ===
In the 1990s, ASPE provided leadership for President Bill Clinton’s health care and welfare reform proposals. It played a major role developing HIPAA privacy regulations after HIPAA became law in 1996. In 1998 Congress supplemented ASPE's research budget by $31.4 million specifically for the purpose of studying welfare reform outcomes over a five-year period. During the 1990s, ASPE formed two new divisions: one on aging and long-term care policy to directly address the challenge of the aging US population, and one on science and data policy.

=== 2000s ===
In the 2000s, ASPE continues to be instrumental in drafting the HHS Strategic Plan. This document outlines the plans for each agency within the Department for the upcoming five years. ASPE's analytical efforts have supported several Secretarial and Presidential strategic priorities including: the Affordable Care Act, value-driven healthcare, affordable choices, pandemic influenza preparedness, health information technology (HIT), personalized health care, emergency preparedness, prevention, food import safety, chronic homelessness, disadvantaged youth, and welfare reauthorization.

== List of Assistant Secretaries since 1965 ==
- William Gorham, 1965–1968
- Alice Rivlin, 1968–1969
- Lewis H. Butler
- William A. Morrill
- Henry J. Aaron
- Benjamin Heineman
- John L. Palmer
- Robert J. Rubin
- Robert B. Helms
- Martin H. Gerry
- David Ellwood
- Peter Edelman
- Margaret Hamburg
- Bobby Jindal
- Michael O'Grady
- Ben Sasse
- Sherry Glied
- Richard G. Frank
- Stephen T. Parente
- Rebecca Haffajee
