= Richard Franck (disambiguation) =

Richard Franck was a German musician.

Richard Franck may also refer to:

- Richard Franck (captain) (1624?–1708)

== See also ==
- Richard Frank (disambiguation)
