= Richard Briffault =

American lawyer and professor

- Education: Columbia University (BA); Harvard University (JD)
- Known for: Chairman of the New York City Conflicts of Interest Board (2014-20)
- Spouse: Sherry Glied (m. 1993)
- Scientific career
- Fields: constitutional law government regulation election law
- Workplaces: Columbia Law School

Richard Briffault is an American legal scholar. He is the Joseph P. Chamberlain Professor of Legislation at Columbia Law School. From 2014 to 2020, he served as Chairman of the New York City Conflicts of Interest Board. His specialties are constitutional law, government regulation, and election law.

== Biography ==
Briffault earned a bachelor's degree from Columbia University in 1974. During his undergraduate studies, Briffault served as Managing Editor of the Columbia Daily Spectator in 1973. He graduated from Harvard Law School in 1977.

Briffault subsequently clerked for Judge Shirley Hufstedler of the 9th Circuit Court of Appeals, worked for New York Governor Hugh Carey as assistant counsel, and worked for the law firm Paul, Weiss, Rifkind, Wharton & Garrison as an associate. Briffault began teaching at Columbia Law School in 1983, and was later named the Joseph P. Chamberlain Professor of Legislation. His specialties are constitutional law, government regulation, and election law.

He has been the reporter for the American Law Institute's Principles of Government Ethics project, and, was named to Governor Andrew M. Cuomo’s Commission to Investigate Public Corruption, the Moreland Commission, which probes systemic public corruption and the appearance of such corruption in state government, political campaigns, and elections.

From 2014 to 2020, he served as Chairman of the New York City Conflicts of Interest Board. The Board is an enforcement agency that governs the ethical conduct of public employees. Mayor Bill de Blasio nominated Briffault for the post, and Briffault said: “I have spent my entire career working for a more ethical and honest government." He said in 2022: “The essence of [the Board] is making sure that public servants are serving the public and not serving their own interests or serving the interests of people associated with them. appearances also matter, in terms of public confidence in the integrity of their officials.”

== Personal life and family ==
He married Canadian economist Sherry Glied in 1993. Glied served as the Dean of New York University's Robert F. Wagner Graduate School of Public Service until 2025.
