= Sherry Glied =

Canadian economist

Assistant Secretary of Health and Human Services for Planning and Evaluation
- In office 2010–2012
- President: Barack Obama
- Preceded by: Ben Sasse
- Succeeded by: Richard G. Frank

Personal details
- Born: 1961 (age 64–65) Toronto, Canada
- Spouse: Richard Briffault

Sherry A. Glied (born 1961) is a Canadian-American economist. Glied was Dean of New York University's Robert F. Wagner Graduate School of Public Service from 2013 to 2025. From 2010 to 2012, she was Assistant Secretary at the United States Department of Health and Human Services in the Obama administration.

== Career ==
From 1992 to 1993, Glied worked as a senior economist at the Council of Economic Advisers where she specialized in healthcare and labor policy. Glied was also a member of the President's Task Force on National Health Care Reform, a committee established by the Clinton health care plan of 1993.

Glied was a professor of Health Policy and Management at Columbia University Mailman School of Public Health where she was Chair of the Department of Health Policy and Management from 1998 to 2009. Glied was also Assistant Secretary of Health and Human Services for Planning and Evaluation from 2010 to 2012.

Glied has written dozens of academic articles and several books. She is a frequent national media commentator on public health issues.

== Personal life ==
In 1993, Glied married Richard Briffault, an attorney and professor at Columbia Law School.

== Significant works ==
- Barbash, Gabriel I., and Sherry A. Glied. "New technology and health care costs—the case of robot-assisted surgery." New England Journal of Medicine 363.8 (2010): 701-704.
- Frank, Richard G., and Sherry A. Glied. Better but not well: Mental health policy in the United States since 1950. JHU Press, 2006.
- Glied, Sherry, and Joshua Graff Zivin. "How do doctors behave when some (but not all) of their patients are in managed care?." Journal of Health Economics 21.2 (2002): 337-353.
