= Dannette Smith =

Dannette Smith has been the chief executive officer of the Nebraska Department of Health And Human Services since February 2019. Before that, she was the Director of Human Services for Virginia Beach, Virginia.

== Biography ==
Smith earned an undergraduate degree from Eastern Michigan University in psychology and her MSW from the University of Illinois Chicago. At the Harvard Kennedy School, Smith completed the Child Welfare League of America’s child welfare leadership program.

== Career ==
For the Council of State Governments, Smith co-chairs the Human Services Task Force Subcommittee.

Nebraska Governor Jim Pillen reappointed her CEO when he was elected in 2022.
