= Richard N. Frank =

American restaurant owner

Richard N. Frank (May 5, 1923 – May 20, 2015) was an American businessperson and restaurateur. He was the owner of Lawry's Restaurants and created the Lawry's Beef Bowl contest in 1956.

== Early life ==
Frank graduated from Pomona College in 1946.

== Legacy ==
Frank Dining Hall, the main dining hall for Pomona's South Campus, is named after him.
