= Richard M. Frank =

Richard "Dick" Frank was chairman of the board and chief executive officer of Showbiz Pizza Time, later CEC Entertainment from March 1986 to December 2008. He joined the company in 1985.
