= Mark Fahleson =

American politician

Mark Allan Fahleson (born January 26, 1967, in Kansas City, Missouri) is a Nebraska attorney. He served as chairman of the Nebraska Republican Party from January 2009 to March 9, 2013.

== Professional background ==
Fahleson is a graduate of the University of Nebraska College of Law, where he served as Editor-in-Chief of the Nebraska Law Review. After law school. Fahleson served as a judicial clerk to the Honorable D. Nick Caporale of the Nebraska Supreme Court. Fahleson entered the private practice of law in 1993, first practicing in Omaha, and since 1997 has been an attorney with Rembolt Ludtke LLP in Lincoln, Nebraska. In this capacity he has been selected as the City Attorney for Waverly and Ashland, Nebraska, and has been appointed a Special Assistant Attorney General for the State of Nebraska. Fahleson has also served as an adjunct professor at the University of Nebraska College of Law teaching employment law. He has served as a chair in the Labor Relations and Employment Law Section of the Nebraska State Bar Association as well as Program Chair for the 2005 national Employment Law seminar for DRI—The Voice of the Defense Bar. He has been repeatedly recognized as a "Leading Individual--Employment Lawyers in Nebraska" by Chambers USA, and since 2007 has been listed in The Best Lawyers in America (Labor & Employment Law). He also served as Chair of the Employment Law Committee of DRI—The Voice of the Defense Bar.

== Political background ==
From 1995 until October 1997 Fahleson served as Chief-of-Staff and Legislative Director for U.S. Representative Jon Christensen. He has held various positions with local and state Republican organizations, and was a voting delegate to the 2008 Republican National Convention in Minneapolis. In January 2009 Fahleson was elected Chairman of the Nebraska Republican Party on a platform of improving the state party's use of technology in reaching younger voters. In this capacity Fahleson served as a voting member of the Republican National Committee and sat on the RNC's Rules and Technology Committees as well as the important Committee on Contests.

In 2010 Fahleson led the Nebraska Republican Party to one of its most successful election cycles in history, evidenced by the reelection of every Republican constitutional officer, election of a new Republican State Treasurer, reelection all three members of the U.S House of Representatives, and adding another Republican to the Nebraska Unicameral to give Republicans a 34–15 margin over Democrats. On January 8, 2011, he was unanimously reelected to a second term as the Nebraska Republican Party's top official. With the national media and political press present, in 2012 Fahleson chaired a contentious Nebraska Republican Party state convention that delivered the remaining delegates for eventual nominee Mitt Romney. During the 2012 election cycle, the Fahleson-led NEGOP delivered all five of its electoral votes for Mitt Romney and helped elect Deb Fischer to the U.S. Senate, accomplishing Fahleson's goal of having every statewide elected office in Nebraska held by a Republican. Fahleson did not seek a third term, and attorney J.L. Spray was elected to succeed him on March 9, 2013.

== Published works ==
- "Workplace Privacy–The Emerging Frontier," For the Defense (2006)
- “Workplace Privacy: Balancing Employer and Employee Rights and Obligations” The Nebraska Lawyer (Mar. 2002)
- “Attention Practitioners: Employment Noncompetition Provisions are Enforceable in Nebraska–Sort of,” The Nebraska Lawyer (Oct. 2000)
- "The Public Policy Exception to Employment at Will–When Should Courts Defer to the Legislature?," Nebraska Law Review, Vol. 72, No. 4 (1994)
