= Captive supply =

Economics concept

Captive supply is that part of the supply that is not owned by a company but is used by the company to maximize its own profits. Typically applied in the meat-packing industry, it is when a company agrees to purchase goods at least two weeks in the future rather than immediately.

== Economic debate and regulation ==
Captive supply arrangements have been the subject of economic debate and regulatory scrutiny in the United States, particularly in livestock markets. Critics argue that when meat packers rely on livestock owned or contractually controlled in advance, demand in the open cash market may be reduced, potentially affecting price discovery and competition. Supporters contend that captive supply arrangements can improve supply coordination, reduce transaction costs, and provide producers with more predictable pricing and market access.

Federal policymakers have examined captive supply practices in connection with livestock market transparency, competition policy, and mandatory price reporting. These issues have been discussed in the context of federal oversight of meat-packing markets and proposals to address concerns related to market concentration and bargaining power.
