= Patrick Borchers =

American lawyer

Personal details
- Born: September 1961 (age 64–65) Madison, Wisconsin, U.S.
- Party: Democratic
- Education: University of Notre Dame; University of California, Davis

Patrick J. Borchers (born 1961) is a lawyer, university administrator and politician from the state of Nebraska in the Midwestern United States. He is a member of the faculty of the Creighton University School of Law in the city of Omaha. In 2016, he ran unsuccessfully for a seat in the Nebraska legislature. Borchers is a member of the Democratic Party.

== Life and career ==
Borchers was born in Madison, Wisconsin. He graduated from Boulder High School in Boulder Colorado in 1979. He received a B.S. in physics with Honors from the University of Notre Dame in 1983. He is a 1986 graduate of the University of California, Davis School of Law where he was elected to the Order of the Coif. He was a law clerk to Anthony Kennedy from 1986 to 1987 when Kennedy was a judge on the U.S. Court of Appeals for the Ninth Circuit. Kennedy was later elevated to the U.S. Supreme Court.

Borchers practiced law in Sacramento, California. In Board of Supervisors v. Local Agency Formation Com., 3 Cal. 4th 903 (1992), he successfully represented before the California Supreme Court a citizens group attempting to form the new city of Citrus Heights, California, arguing that it did not violate the Equal Protection Clause to restrict voting to those within the proposed city's boundaries.

== Academic career ==
After starting his academic career at Albany Law School, he was appointed in 1999 Dean of Creighton University School of Law in Omaha, Nebraska, serving until 2007. While in that position, he founded the Werner Institute for Negotiation and Dispute Resolution. In 2007, Borchers was appointed Vice President for Academic Affairs at Creighton, the Chief Academic Officer of the university. He stepped down in 2013 and was appointed director of the Werner Institute for Negotiation and Dispute Resolution. In August 2015, Borchers stepped down as director and returned to full-time law faculty duties. Borchers's academic specialties include private international law (conflict of laws), international arbitration and federal jurisdiction and procedure. He is the author, co-author or editor of seven books and about 60 law review articles.

Borchers's affidavits have been cited in conflict-of-laws cases in both the U.S. and Ontario. His works have been cited by the United States Supreme Court and U.S. Courts of Appeal. State appellate courts have also cited his writings, including New York, Louisiana, Missouri) New Jersey, Tennessee, Illinois, and Michigan.

In 2007, Borchers and several other faculty members at Creighton University authored a report, funded by the United States Agency for International Development on a possible resolution of the outstanding expropriation claims against Cuba in the event of a shift in U.S.-Cuba relations. The report recommended the creation of a Cuba-U.S. Tribunal to resolve the claims and suggested that since Cuba lacked sufficient hard currency to resolve the claims, claimants accept other forms of compensation, e.g. tax-free zones or development rights.

== Politics ==
In 2016, Borchers ran for the Nebraska legislature from the 39th District, a heavily Republican district consisting of the western portion of Douglas County. Under Nebraska's term-limits law, the incumbent, Republican Beau McCoy, was ineligible to run for a third consecutive term. In the non-partisan primary, Borchers (then a Republican) faced fellow Republican Lou Ann Linehan, who had been an aide for former U.S. senator Chuck Hagel, and Democrat Bill Armbrust, a farmer who described himself as a "compassionate conservative" with libertarian elements. When the primary was held, Borchers came in third, with 1862 of the 6169 votes cast, or 30.2%. Armbrust received 1971 votes, or 32.0%; Linehan won 2336 votes, or 37.9%. As the top two vote-getters, Armbrust and Linehan moved on to the general election, while Borchers was eliminated. Linehan went on to win the seat, winning 55% of the vote in the general election to Armbrust's 45%.

On March 22, 2020, Borchers changed registration to the Democratic Party.
