= Stephen T. Parente =

American health economist

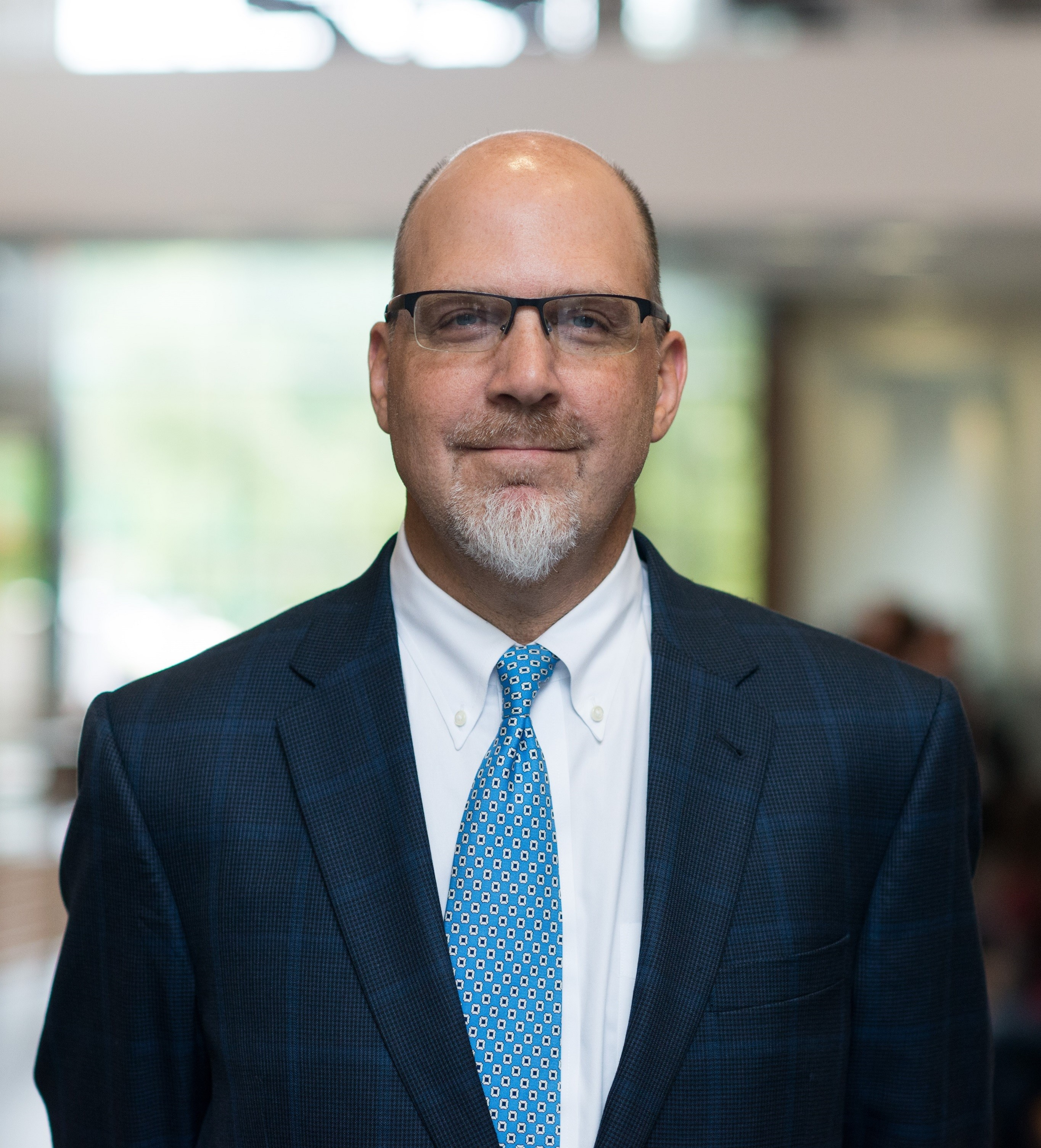
- Occupation: Health economist

Stephen T. Parente is an American health economist. He currently serves as a Professor of Finance and the Minnesota Insurance Industry Chair at the Carlson School of Management and Finance at the University of Minnesota. In April 2017, President Donald Trump nominated Parente to be Assistant Secretary for Planning and Evaluation in the United States Department of Health and Human Services.

== Research ==
Parente's research focuses on health insurance markets and specifically consumer-driven health care. In addition, he has peer-reviewed publications on health care reform, health information technology, health care entitlements such as Medicare and Medicaid, and the assessment of consumer choice. As of 2017, he has over 100 peer-reviewed publications.

He has managed as principal investigator a grant portfolio of over $8 million in grants and contracts. In addition to health insurance, his funded research at the University of Minnesota has focused on medical care productivity, Medicare reform, health care e-commerce, and the national impact on health information technology on productivity and cost. In particular, his research predicted the premium increases associated with the Patient Protection and Affordable Care Act of 2010.

== Career ==
He has served as chair of the Health Care Cost Institute and Health Adviser to the Congressional Budget Office. He has been the longest serving director of the Medical Industry Leadership Institute (MILI). The medical industry specialization has made Carlson the number two school in the world for health care MBA jobs post-graduation. He is the founding director of the Medical Valuation Laboratory, a nine college interdisciplinary effort to accelerate medical innovation from scientists, clinicians, and entrepreneurs. He led the development of Carlson's Industry MBA program, a novel online one-year MBA program designed for U.S. congressional staffers focused on the finance, technology, health, and energy industrial sectors. The program was recognized as a top ten business education innovation in Poets and Quants.

He previously served as a Legislative Fellow for Sen. Jay Rockefeller (D-WV) and a senior health policy advisor to the 2008 presidential campaign of Sen. John McCain (R-AZ).

In April 2017, President Donald Trump nominated Parente to be the Assistant Secretary for Planning and Evaluation in the United States Department of Health and Human Services. His nomination was eventually withdrawn due to financial conflicts.

Parente worked as a senior economist for the Council of Economic Advisers, and he was appointed to help oversee the allocation of hospital funding in the Coronavirus Aid, Relief, and Economic Security Act.

Parente was appointed to the United States Preventive Services Task Force by Robert F. Kennedy Jr. in September 2026.
