= List of state agencies of Nebraska =

This is a list of state agencies in Nebraska.

== Agencies ==
State agencies in the U.S. state of Nebraska
Name	Address	Notes	Current Director / Chair Person
Board of Parole	West Prospector Place and Folsom Street, Building #1, First Floor. P.O. BOX 94754. Lincoln, NE 68509		Rosalyn Cotton
Department of Administrative Services	1526 K Street, Lincoln, NE 68508		Lee Will
Department of Agriculture	4th Floor, State Office Bldg. 301 Centennial Mall South. PO Box 94947. 68509-4947		Sherry Vinton
Department of Banking And Finance	Suite 300, 1526 K St. Lincoln, NE. PO Box 95006. 68508		Kelly Lammers
Department of Correctional Services	P.O. Box 94661. Lincoln, NE 68509-4661		Scott Frakes
Department of Economic Development	301 Centennial Mall South. P.O. Box 94666. Lincoln, NE 68509-4666		Tony Goins
Department of Education	500 S. 84th St., 2nd Floor. P.O. Box 94987 Lincoln, NE 68509-4987		Matthew Blomstedt
Department of Environment & Energy	245 Fallbrook Blvd. P.O. Box 98922		Jim Macy
Department of Health And Human Services	301 Centennial Mall South, 68509		Dannette Smith
Department of Insurance	Suite 400, Terminal Bldg. 941 "O" St. 68508		Eric Dunning
Department of Labor	550 So. 16th St. PO Box 94600. 68509-4600		John Albin
Department of Military	2433 NW 24th St. 68524-1801	Includes the office of the Adjutant General	Maj. Gen. Daryl Bohac
Department of Motor Vehicles	Mall Level, State Office Bldg. 301 Centennial Mall South. PO Box 94789. 68509-4789		Rhonda Lahm
Department of Natural Resources	245 Fallbrook Blvd, Suite 201, Lincoln, NE. 68521-6729		Tom Riley
Department of Revenue	2nd Floor, State Office Bldg. 301 Centennial Mall South. PO Box 94818. 68509-4818		Tony Fulton
Department of Transportation	1500 NE-2, Lincoln, NE 68502		John R. Selmer
Department of Veteran's Affairs	6th Floor, State Office Bldg. 301 Centennial Mall South. PO Box 95083. 68509-5083		John Hilgert
Fire Marshal	246 So. 14th St. 68508-1804		Christopher Cantrell
Nebraska Emergency Management Agency	2433 NW 24th St. 58524-1801	Formerly the office of the Civil Defense Agency	Maj. Gen. Daryl Bohac
Office of the Capitol Commission	P.O. Box 94696 Lincoln, NE 68509-4696		Robert Ripley
Office of the Chief Information Officer	501 So. 14th St. PO Box 95045. 68509-5045	Formerly Central Data Processing Service Division	Ed Toner
State Patrol	1600 Nebraska Hwy. 2. PO Box 94907. 68509-4907		John Bolduc

State College & University Systems
Institution	Location	Current Director/President
Board of Trustees of Nebraska State Colleges	11th Floor State Capitol. PO Box 94605. Lincoln 68509-4605	Jess Zeiss
Chadron State College	1000 Main St. Chadron. 69337-2690	Ron Patterson
Central Community College Area	3134 W. Hwy. 34. PO Box 4903. Grand Island. 68802-4903	Marr Gotscall
Metropolitan Community College Area	30th And Fort St. PO Box 3777. Omaha. 68103-0777	Randy Schmailzl
Mid-Plains Community College Area	416 No. Jeffers. North Platte. 69101	Ryan Purdy
Nebraska Community College System	1327 H Street, Suite 200. Lincoln, NE 68508	Paul Turman
Northeast Community College Area	801 E. Benjamin, PO Box 469. Norfolk. 68702-0469	Leah A. Barrett
Peru State College	PO Box 10. Peru. 68421	Michael Evans
Southeast Community College Area	8800 "O" St. 68520-1299	Jack Huck
University of Nebraska at Kearney	25th St And 9th Ave. Kearney. 68849	Douglas A. Kristensen
University of Nebraska at Lincoln	1400 R St. Lincoln, NE 68588	Rodney Bennett
University of Nebraska at Omaha	111 Eppley Administration Building, Omaha, NE.	Joanne Li
University of Nebraska System	1400 R St, Lincoln, NE.	Chris Kabourek (interim)
Wayne State College	1111 Main St. Wayne. 68787	Marysz Rames
Western Community College Area	1601 E. 27th St. N.E. Scottsbluff. 69361-1899	Todd R. Holcomb

State Boards, Commissions, & Miscellaneous Entities
Institution	Location	Notes	Current Director/Chairperson
Accountability and Disclosure Commission	11th Floor, State Capitol. PO Box 95086. 68509-5086		Jeffery Davis
Athletic Commission	1st Floor, State Office Bldg. 301 Centennial Mall South. PO Box 94743. 68509-4743		Aaron Hendry
Arts Council	1004 Farnam Street, Lower Level, Omaha, NE 68102		Suzanne Wise
Board of Barber Examiners	1220 Lincoln Mall, Suite 100, PO Box 94723, Lincoln Ne. 68509-4723		Joshua Vasquez
Board of Educational Lands And Funds	555 N. Cotner Blvd. 68505-2353		Kelly Sudbeck
Board of Engineers And Architects	215 Centennial Mall South, Suite 400, Lincoln, NE, 68508-1813	Name Changed in 1997 from Board of Examiners for Professional Engineers and Architects	Jon Wilbeck
Board of Examiners and Abstracters	301 Centennial Mall S, P.O. Box 94944, 68508		Julie Hoppe
Board of Examiners for Land Surveyors	555 N. Cotner Blvd., Lower Level. 68505		Dennis Whitfield
Board of Geologists	6th Floor, 301 Centennial Mall South. PO Box 94844. 68501-4844		Charles Joyce
Board of Landscape Architects	6th Floor, State Office Bldg. 301 Centennial Mall South. PO Box 95165. 68509-5165		Jennifer Seacrest
Board of Public Accountancy	1526 K Street, Suite 410. Lincoln, NE 68508		Dan Sweetwood
Board of Trustees of Nebraska State Colleges	11th Floor State Capitol. PO Box 94605. Lincoln 68509-4605		Jess Zeiss
Brand Committee	411 Niobrara Avenue, Alliance, NE 69301		John Widdowson
Central Nebraska Public Power and Irrigation District	415 Lincoln St. PO Box 740. Holdrege. 68949-0740		Devin Brundage
Children's Commission	1225 L Street, Suite 401. Lincoln NE 68508		Jeanne Brandner
Commission for Blind And Visually Impaired	4600 Valley Rd., Ste. 100. Lincoln, NE 68510-4844		Carlos Serván
Commission for the Deaf and Hard of Hearing	4600 Valley Rd., Ste. 420. 68510-4844	Prior to 1997 it was known as the Commission for the Hearing Impaired	John Wyvill
Commission on Indian Affairs	6th Floor, State Capitol, P.O Box 94981. 68509		Judi gaiashkibos
Commission on African American Affairs			
Commission of Industrial Relations	5th Floor, State Office Bldg. 301 Centennial Mall South. PO Box 94864. 68509-4864		William Blake
Commission on Law Enforcement And Criminal Justice	5th Floor, State Office Bldg. 301 Centennial Mall South. PO Box 94946. 68509-4946		Don Arp, Jr.
Coordinating Commission For Postsecondary Education	P.O. Box 95005. Lincoln, NE 68509-5005		Michael Baumgartner
Dry Bean Commission	4502 Avenue I. Scottsbluff. 69361		Mitchell Stephenson
Educational Telecommunications Commission	1800 N. 33rd St. PO Box 83111. 68501-3111	Nebraska Public TV And Radio	Nicholas Baxter
Environmental Trust Fund	700 S 16th Street - PO Box 94913 Lincoln, NE 68509-4913	Paid for by the Nebraska Lottery	Karl Elmshaeuser
Ethanol Board	4th Floor, State Office Bldg. 301 Centennial Mall South. PO Box 94922. 68509-4922		Jan tenBensel
Equal Opportunity Commission	5th Floor, State Office Bldg. 301 Centennial Mall South. PO Box 94934. 68509-4934. 471-2024 Or 800-642-6112		Paula Gardner
Film Office	301 Centennial Mall South, 4th Floor. Lincoln, NE 68508		Laurie Richards
Game And Parks Commission	2200 No. 33rd St. PO Box 30370. 68503-0370		Tim McCoy
Geographic Information Systems Steering Comm.	P.O. Box 94664 501 S. 14th Street Lincoln, NE 68509		Jeff McReynolds
Hall Of Fame Commission	c/o Director, State Historical Society. 1500 "R" St. PO Box 82554. 68508-2554		Trevor Jones
Historical Society	1500 "R" St. PO Box 82554. 68508-2554		David Levy
Humanities Council	215 Centennial Mall South, Ste. 500. 68508		Chris Sommerrich
Latino-American Commission	6th Floor, State Capitol. PO Box 94965. 68509-4965		Yesenia Peck
Library Commission	Suite 120, The Atrium. 1200 "N" St. 68508-2023		Rod Wagner
Liquor Control Commission	5th Floor, State Office Bldg. 301 Centennial Mall South. PO Box 95046. 68509-5046		Hobert Rupe
Loup River Public Power District	2404 15th St., PO Box 988., Columbus. 68601		Neal Suess
Metropolitan Utilities District			Mark Doyle
Nebraska Public Power District	1414 15th St. PO Box 499. Columbus. 68602-0499		Tom Kent
Nebraska Public Service Commission	1200 N Street, Suite 300, Lincoln, NE 68508		Thomas Golden
Oil And Gas Conservation Commission	922 Illinois St. PO Box 399. Sidney. 69162-0399		Stan Belieu
Omaha Public Power District	444 S. 16th St., Omaha. 68102		L. Javier Fernandez
Print Shop	501 So. 14th St. 68509		Mitch Salomons
Power Association			Neal Suess
Power Review Board	5th Floor, State Office Bldg. 301 Centennial Mall South. PO Box 94713. 68509-4713		Timothy Texel
Professional Practices Commission	Lower Level, State Office Bldg. 301 Centennial Mall South. PO Box 94941. 68509		Kelly Muthersbaugh
Racing Commission	Floor, State Office Bldg. 301 Centennial Mall South. PO Box 95014 68509-5014		Dennis P. Lee
Real Estate Appraiser Board	5th Floor, State Office Bldg. 301 Centennial Mall South. PO Box 94963. 68509-4963		Tyler Kohtz
Real Estate Commission	Suite 402, The Atrium. 1200 "N" Street. PO Box 94667. 68509-4667		Robert B. Evnen
School for the Deaf		Inactive since 1998	
Serve Nebraska	6th Floor West, State Capitol. PO Box 98927. 68509-8927		Cathy Plager
State Fair Board	State Fair Park. PO Box 81223. 68501-1223		Bob Haag
State Electrical Division	Suite 109, 800 S. 13th St. PO Box 95066. 68509-5066		Craig Thelen
State Library	P.O. Box 98931 Lincoln, NE 68509		
Tax Equalization & Review Commission	P.O. Box 95108, 301 Centennial Mall South, Lincoln, Nebraska 68509-5108		Steven Keetle
Workers' Compensation Court	12th 7 13th Floor, State Capitol. PO Box 98908. 68509-8908		Daniel R. Fridrich
Youth Leadership Council	315 West 60th Street, Suite 400. Kearney, NE 68845		Kathy Lloyd

== See also ==
- History of Nebraska
