= 1990 United States Senate election in Nebraska =

- November 5, 1990
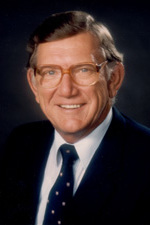

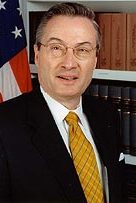
| Nominee | J. James Exon | Hal Daub |
| Party | Democratic | Republican |
| Popular vote | 349,779 | 243,013 |
| Percentage | 58.90% | 40.92% |
- County results Exon: 50–60% 60–70% 70–80% Daub: 50–60% 60–70% 70–80% 80–90%
U.S. senator before election
J. James Exon
Democratic
Elected U.S. Senator
J. James Exon
Democratic

The 1990 United States Senate election in Nebraska was held on November 5, 1990. Incumbent Senator J. James Exon ran for re-election to a third term. He was challenged by Republican nominee Hal Daub, who had previously represented the 2nd congressional district before unsuccessfully running for the U.S. Senate in 1988.

National Republicans targeted Exon's seat, given President George Bush's landslide victory in the state in 1988 and Exon's narrow victory in 1984. However, the midterm elections saw comparatively little change nationwide, and saw the fewest number of Senate seat changes since the ratification of the Seventeenth Amendment in 1913. Exon ultimately defeated Daub in a landslide, winning 59% of the vote.

This was the last time that a Democratic candidate won the Class II Senate seat in Nebraska, and Exon remains the only Democrat to have held this seat in the Senate.

== Background ==
In 1984, despite Ronald Reagan's landslide presidential victory in the concurrent election, J. James Exon held the Senate seat, defeating Republican Nancy Hoch with nearly 52% of the vote. By contrast, Reagan won Nebraska in the presidential election with 70% of the vote to 28% for Democratic candidate Walter Mondale.

== Primaries ==
=== Democratic primary ===
==== Candidates ====
- J. James Exon, incumbent U.S. Senator

==== Results ====
Democratic primary results
| Party | Candidate | Votes | % |
|---|---|---|---|
| Democratic | J. James Exon (inc.) | 157,959 | 98.75% |
| Democratic | Write-ins | 2,006 | 1.25% |
| Total votes | | 159,965 | 100.00% |

=== Republican primary ===
==== Candidates ====
- Hal Daub, former U.S. Representative from Nebraska's 2nd congressional district
- Otis Glebe, real estate investor

===== Declined =====
- Doug Bereuter, U.S. Representative from Nebraska's 1st congressional district
- Ron Staskiewicz, Douglas County Attorney

===== Campaign =====
Congressman Doug Bereuter, who was passed over for an appointment to the U.S. Senate in 1987, considered running for the Senate against Exon, and was heavily recruited by national Republicans. However, on June 5, 1989, Bereuter announced that he would not seek the Republican nomination, and would instead seek re-election, citing a lack of "adequate campaign resources" for a statewide campaign with a competitive gubernatorial election and the possibility that Republicans would lose his seat.

Following Bereuter's decision to not challenge Exon, former Congressman Hal Daub emerged as the favorite candidate of national and state party leaders. Douglas County Attorney Ron Staskiewicz explored a campaign, and launched a statewide tour in anticipation of a possible campaign. Daub announced his campaign on February 12, 1990, and Staskiewicz announced shortly thereafter that he would run for Congress from the 2nd district. Daub's only challenger in the Republican primary was Otis Glebe, a real-estate investor. Daub defeated Glebe in a landslide, winning 91 percent of the vote.

===== Results =====
Republican primary results
| Party | Candidate | Votes | % |
|---|---|---|---|
| Republican | Hal Daub | 178,237 | 91.26% |
| Republican | Otis Glebe | 16,367 | 8.38% |
| Republican | Write-ins | 711 | 0.36% |
| Total votes | | 195,315 | 100.00% |

== General election ==
=== Results ===
1990 United States Senate election in Nebraska
| Party | Candidate | Votes | % | ±% |
|---|---|---|---|---|
| Democratic | J. James Exon (inc.) | 349,779 | 58.90% | +6.97% |
| Republican | Hal Daub | 243,013 | 40.92% | −7.09% |
| Write-in | | 1,036 | 0.17% | — |
| Majority | | 106,766 | 17.98% | +14.06% |
| Total votes | | 593,828 | 100.00% | |
| Democratic hold | | | | |

== Aftermath ==
On January 3, 1991, Exon was sworn in to the 102nd United States Congress by then–Vice President Dan Quayle alongside his fellow Senators-elect.

== See also ==
- 1990 United States House of Representatives elections in Nebraska
