= 1986 Nebraska gubernatorial election =

- November 4, 1986
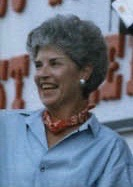

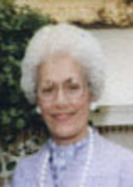
Nominee	Kay Orr	Helen Boosalis
Party	Republican	Democratic
Running mate	Bill Nichol	Donald McGinley
Popular vote	298,325	265,156
Percentage	52.86%	46.98%
- County results Orr: 40–50% 50–60% 60–70% 70–80% 80–90% Boosalis: 50–60% 60–70%
Governor before election
Bob Kerrey
Democratic
Elected Governor
Kay Orr
Republican

The 1986 Nebraska gubernatorial election was held on November 4, 1986, and featured state Treasurer Kay Orr, a Republican, defeating Democratic nominee, former Mayor of Lincoln Helen Boosalis. Incumbent Democratic governor Bob Kerrey did not seek a second term.

The election was the first state gubernatorial election in U.S. history where the candidates of both major national parties were women. Orr was the first woman elected governor of a Midwestern state.

== Democratic primary ==
=== Governor ===
==== Candidates ====
- Chris Beutler, member of the Nebraska Legislature
- Helen Boosalis, former mayor of Lincoln and Director of the Nebraska Department of Aging
- Barton E. Chandler
- Mina B. Dillingham
- David Domina, attorney
- Marge Higgins, member of the Nebraska Legislature
- Robert J. Prokop

==== Results ====
Democratic gubernatorial primary results
Party	Candidate	Votes	%
Democratic	Helen Boosalis	63,833	44.01
Democratic	David Domina	37,975	26.18
Democratic	Chris Beutler	31,605	21.79
Democratic	Robert J. Prokop	5,160	3.56
Democratic	Marge Higgins	4,433	3.06
Democratic	Barton E. Chandler	1,260	0.87
Democratic	Mina B. Dillingham	402	0.28
Democratic	Write-in	369	0.25

=== Lieutenant governor ===
==== Candidates ====
- Rachel Hepburn, director of social services and public relations at O.U.R. Homes from Lincoln, Nebraska, who withdrew from the race in April 1986
- Donald F. McGinley, incumbent Nebraska Lieutenant Governor
- Ken L. Michaelis, disbarred attorney from West Point, Nebraska

==== Results ====
Democratic lieutenant gubernatorial primary results
Party	Candidate	Votes	%
Democratic	Donald F. McGinley (incumbent)	76,602	62.65
Democratic	Ken L. Michaelis	23,646	19.34
Democratic	Rachel Hepburn	21,822	17.85
Democratic	Write-in	193	0.16

== Republican primary ==
=== Governor ===
==== Candidates ====
- Kermit Brashear, attorney and former chairman of the Nebraska Republican Party
- Nancy Hoch, businesswoman and Republican nominee for U.S. Senate in 1984
- Chuck Loos
- Kay Orr, Nebraska State Treasurer
- Paul A. Rosberg
- Everett Sileven
- Monte Taylor
- Roger Yant

==== Results ====
Republican gubernatorial primary results
Party	Candidate	Votes	%
Republican	Kay Orr	75,914	39.41
Republican	Kermit Brashear	60,308	31.30
Republican	Nancy Hoch	42,649	22.14
Republican	Everett Sileven	4,281	2.22
Republican	Paul A. Rosberg	4,280	2.22
Republican	Monte Taylor	3,276	1.70
Republican	Roger Yant	682	0.35
Republican	Chuck Loos	658	0.34
Republican	Write-in	601	0.31

=== Lieutenant governor ===
==== Candidates ====
- Richard J. Mathews, retired Air Force officer from Bellevue, Nebraska
- Randy Moody, lobbyist, former Lancaster County Republican chairman, and former aide to Rep. John Y. McCollister, Sen. Roman Hruska, Rep. Virginia D. Smith, and Gov. Charles Thone from Lincoln, Nebraska
- Bill Nichol, Speaker of the Nebraska Legislature since 1983 and member of the Nebraska Legislature in District 48 since 1975 from Scottsbluff, Nebraska.

==== Results ====
Republican lieutenant gubernatorial primary results
Party	Candidate	Votes	%
Republican	Bill Nichol	80,621	52.12
Republican	Randy Moody	38,160	24.67
Republican	Richard J. Mathews	35,656	23.05
Republican	Write-in	260	0.17

== General election ==
=== Results ===
Nebraska gubernatorial election, 1986
Party	Candidate	Votes	%
Republican	Kay Orr	298,325	52.86%
Democratic	Helen Boosalis	265,156	46.98%
Write-in	Others	941	0.17%
Total votes		564,442	100.0%
Republican gain from Democratic			

==== By County ====
By county

County	Person Democratic		Person Republican		Various candidates Other parties		Margin		Total votes
County	#	%	#	%	#	%	#	%	Total votes
Adams County									
Antelope County									
Arthur County									
Banner County									
Blaine County									
Boone County									
Box Butte County									
Boyd County									
Brown County									
Buffalo County									
Burt County									
Butler County									
Cass County									
Cedar County									
Chase County									
Cherry County									
Cheyenne County									
Clay County									
Colfax County									
Cuming County									
Custer County									
Dakota County									
Dawes County									
Dawson County									
Deuel County									
Dixon County									
Dodge County									
Douglas County									
Dundy County									
Fillmore County									
Franklin County									
Frontier County									
Furnas County									
Gage County									
Garden County									
Garfield County									
Gosper County									
Grant County									
Greeley County									
Hall County									
Hamilton County									
Hayes County									
Hitchcock County									
Holt County									
Hooker County									
Howard County									
Jefferson County									
Johnson County									
Kearney County									
Keith County									
Keya Paha County									
Kimball County									
Knox County									
Lancaster County									
Lincoln County									
Logan County									
Loup County									
Madison County									
McPherson County									
Merrick County									
Morrill County									
Nance County									
Nance County									
Nemaha County									
Nuckolls County									
Otoe County									
Pawnee County									
Perkins County									
Phelps County									
Pierce County									
Platte County									
Polk County									
Red Willow County									
Richardson County									
Rock County									
Saline County									
Sarpy County									
Saunders County									
Scotts Bluff County									
Seward County									
Sheridan County									
Sioux County									
Stanton County									
Thayer County									
Stanton County									
Thurston County									
Valley County									
Washington County									
Wayne County									
Webster County									
Wheeler County									
York County									
Totals									
