= Gerald Whelan =

American politician (1925–1993)

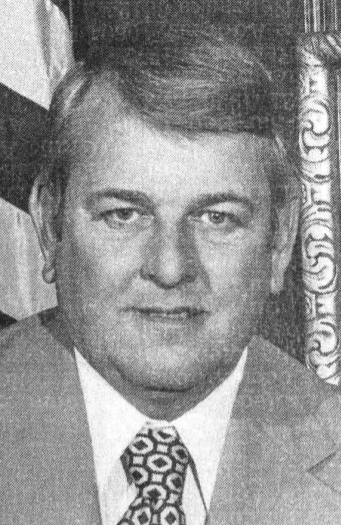

30th Lieutenant Governor of Nebraska
- In office January 9, 1975 – January 4, 1979
- Governor: J. James Exon
- Preceded by: Frank Marsh
- Succeeded by: Roland Luedtke

Personal details
- Born: May 14, 1925 Hastings, Nebraska, U.S.
- Died: January 2, 1993 (aged 67) Hastings, Nebraska, U.S.
- Party: Democratic
- Spouse: Virginia Kellison (m. 1948)
- Children: 4

Gerald T. Whelan (May 14, 1925 – January 2, 1993) was an American politician who served as the 30th lieutenant governor of Nebraska from 1975 to 1979.

Whelan was born in Hastings, Nebraska on May 14, 1925. He graduated from University of Nebraska–Lincoln, obtained a law degree from Creighton University, and practiced law in Hastings.

In 1960, Whelan won the Democratic nomination to run for Nebraska's 1st congressional district, and lost to incumbent Republican Phillip Hart Weaver in the general election.

Whelan, with the endorsement of Democratic governor J. James Exon, beat longtime Nebraska politician Terry Carpenter in the Democratic primary in May 1974 for lieutenant governor, and went on to win the general election. In the 1978 election, Whelan ran for Nebraska Governor, but lost to Charles Thone.

== Personal ==
Whelan married Virginia Kellison (1927–2010) in 1948 and had four children together. He died from cancer at his Hastings, Nebraska home on January 2, 1993, at the age of 67.

Party political offices
Preceded by Ronald E. Reagan	Democratic nominee for Lieutenant Governor of Nebraska; 1974	Succeeded by Orval Keyes
Preceded by J. James Exon	Democratic nominee for Governor of Nebraska; 1978	Succeeded by Bob Kerrey
Political offices
Preceded by Frank Marsh	Lieutenant Governor of Nebraska; 1975–1979	Succeeded by Roland Luedtke
