= Senator Whitney =

Senator Whitney may refer to:

- Arthur Whitney (politician) (1871–1942), New Jersey State Senate
- George H. Whitney (1863–1928), New York State Senate
- James Scollay Whitney (1811–1878), Massachusetts State Senate
- Odell K. Whitney (1884–1967), South Dakota State Senate
- Orson F. Whitney (1855–1931), Utah State Senate
- Ramey Whitney (1908–1988), Nebraska State Senate
