= Shirley Parks =

American politician (1939–2024)

Member of the Nebraska Legislature from the 44th district
- In office September 1, 1978 – January 3, 1979
- Preceded by: Jack Mills
- Succeeded by: Rex Haberman

Personal details
- Born: June 17, 1939 Denver, Colorado
- Died: November 4, 2024 (aged 85) Alexandria, Virginia
- Party: Democratic
- Spouse: M. Douglas Parks
- Occupation: Civic activist, veterinary clinic assistant

Shirley Ann Parks (née Singleton, June 17, 1939 – November 4, 2024) was a Democratic politician from Nebraska who briefly served as a member of the Nebraska Legislature from the 44th district from 1978 to 1979.

== Early life ==
Shirley Singleton was born in Denver, Colorado, in 1939. Her father, James Singleton, served in the Colorado House of Representatives. She married Doug Parks, a veterinarian, and settled in Ogallala, Nebraska. Parks was elected to the Ogallala School Board, and served as the chairman of the Keith County Democratic Party.

== Nebraska Legislature ==
In 1978, State Senator Jack Mills, who had declined to seek re-election, resigned from office to become the executive director of the Nebraska Association of County Officials. Governor J. James Exon appointed Parks to serve out the remaining four months of Mills's term, and she was sworn in on September 1, 1978. When Parks joined the legislature, she became the fourth woman in the body, the first time in state history that four women were consecutively serving in the legislature. Parks declined to be a write-in candidate in the general election.

== Post-legislative career ==
In 1982, Parks ran for Keith County Clerk, challenging incumbent Clerk Leota Wood in the Democratic primary. Wood defeated Parks by a wide margin, receiving 594 votes to Parks's 154 and Joan Ervin's 114.

== Death ==
Parks died on November 4, 2024.
