= 1978 Nebraska gubernatorial election =

- November 7, 1978
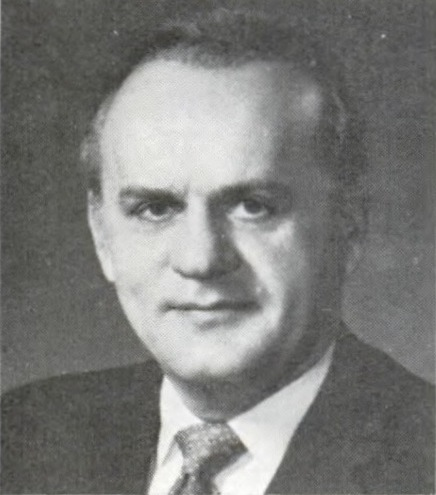

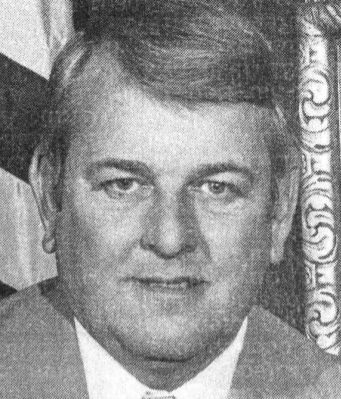
| Nominee | Charles Thone | Gerald Whelan |
| Party | Republican | Democratic |
| Running mate | Roland Luedtke | Orval Keyes |
| Popular vote | 275,473 | 216,754 |
| Percentage | 55.94% | 44.02% |
- County results Thone: 50–60% 60–70% 70–80% 80–90% Whelan: 50–60% 60–70%
Governor before election
J. James Exon
Democratic
Elected Governor
Charles Thone
Republican

The 1978 Nebraska gubernatorial election was held on November 7, 1978, and featured U.S. Representative Charles Thone, a Republican, defeating Democratic nominee, Lieutenant Governor Gerald Whelan. Incumbent Governor J. James Exon, a Democrat, was barred from seeking a third term. Exon was elected to the U.S. Senate that same day.

== Democratic primary ==
=== Governor ===
==== Candidates ====
- Robert V. Hansen
- Gerald Whelan, Lieutenant Governor

==== Results ====
Democratic gubernatorial primary results
| Party | Candidate | Votes | % |
|---|---|---|---|
| Democratic | Gerald Whelan | 104,178 | 79.43 |
| Democratic | Robert V. Hansen | 26,509 | 20.21 |
| Democratic | Write-in | 475 | 0.36 |

=== Lieutenant governor ===
==== Candidates ====
Orval Keyes ran unopposed for the Democratic nomination for lieutenant governor. He was a member of the Nebraska Legislature in District 3 since 1969 from Springfield, Nebraska.

==== Results ====
Democratic lieutenant gubernatorial primary results
| Party | Candidate | Votes | % |
|---|---|---|---|
| Democratic | Orval Keyes | 102,935 | 99.49 |
| Democratic | Write-in | 531 | 0.51 |

== Republican primary ==
=== Governor ===
==== Candidates ====
- Richard Hedrick
- Stan Juelfs
- Robert A. Phares, former Mayor of North Platte
- Vance D. Rogers
- Charles Thone, U.S. Representative

==== Results ====
Republican gubernatorial primary results
| Party | Candidate | Votes | % |
|---|---|---|---|
| Republican | Charles Thone | 89,378 | 45.32 |
| Republican | Robert A. Phares | 48,402 | 24.55 |
| Republican | Stan Juelfs | 43,828 | 22.23 |
| Republican | Vance D. Rogers | 14,076 | 7.14 |
| Republican | Richard Hedrick | 1,470 | 0.75 |
| Republican | Write-in | 43 | 0.02 |

=== Lieutenant governor ===
==== Candidates ====
- Herbert J. Duis, member of the Nebraska Legislature in District 39 since 1969 and previously from 1951 to 1955 from Gothenburg, Nebraska.
- Roland Luedtke, Speaker of the Nebraska Legislature since 1977 and member of the Nebraska Legislature in District 28 since 1967 from Lincoln, Nebraska.
- Dennis L. Rasmussen, member of the Nebraska Legislature in District 41 since 1973 from Scotia, Nebraska.
- Rosemary M. Skrupa, member of the Omaha Public Power District board from Omaha, Nebraska
- Don Stenberg, lawyer from Lincoln, Nebraska

==== Results ====
Republican lieutenant gubernatorial primary results
| Party | Candidate | Votes | % |
|---|---|---|---|
| Republican | Roland Luedtke | 53,762 | 30.85 |
| Republican | Dennis L. Rasmussen | 50,627 | 29.05 |
| Republican | Rosemary M. Skrupa | 28,532 | 16.37 |
| Republican | Don Stenberg | 22,592 | 12.96 |
| Republican | Herbert J. Duis | 18,736 | 10.75 |
| Republican | Write-in | 48 | 0.03 |

== General election ==
=== Results ===
Nebraska gubernatorial election, 1978
| Party | Candidate | Votes | % |
|---|---|---|---|
| Republican | Charles Thone | 275,473 | 55.94% |
| Democratic | Gerald Whelan | 216,754 | 44.02% |
| Write-in | Others | 196 | 0.04% |
| Majority | | 58,719 | 11.92% |
| Total votes | | 492,423 | 100.00% |
| Republican gain from Democratic | | | |

==== By county ====
| County | Charles Thone Republican | | Gerald Whelan Democratic | | Write-in | | Margin | | Total |
| County | Votes | % | Votes | % | Votes | % | Votes | % | Total |
|---|---|---|---|---|---|---|---|---|---|
| Adams | 5,179 | 47.42% | 5,735 | 52.51% | 8 | 0.07% | -556 | -5.09% | 10,922 |
| Antelope | 2,195 | 64.88% | 1,188 | 35.12% | 0 | 0.00% | 1,007 | 29.77% | 3,383 |
| Arthur | 180 | 61.43% | 113 | 38.57% | 0 | 0.00% | 67 | 22.87% | 293 |
| Banner | 301 | 69.68% | 131 | 30.32% | 0 | 0.00% | 170 | 39.35% | 432 |
| Blaine | 268 | 65.69% | 140 | 34.31% | 0 | 0.00% | 128 | 31.37% | 408 |
| Boone | 1,615 | 51.14% | 1,543 | 48.86% | 0 | 0.00% | 72 | 2.28% | 3,158 |
| Box Butte | 2,341 | 61.77% | 1,449 | 38.23% | 0 | 0.00% | 892 | 23.54% | 3,790 |
| Boyd | 834 | 60.17% | 552 | 39.83% | 0 | 0.00% | 282 | 20.35% | 1,386 |
| Brown | 1,184 | 63.15% | 691 | 36.85% | 0 | 0.00% | 493 | 26.29% | 1,875 |
| Buffalo | 5,598 | 50.57% | 5,472 | 49.43% | 0 | 0.00% | 126 | 1.14% | 11,070 |
| Burt | 1,958 | 62.36% | 1,182 | 37.64% | 0 | 0.00% | 776 | 24.71% | 3,140 |
| Butler | 1,712 | 53.57% | 1,484 | 46.43% | 0 | 0.00% | 228 | 7.13% | 3,196 |
| Cass | 3,010 | 49.43% | 3,080 | 50.57% | 0 | 0.00% | -70 | -1.15% | 6,090 |
| Cedar | 3,432 | 78.77% | 925 | 21.23% | 0 | 0.00% | 2,507 | 57.54% | 4,357 |
| Chase | 1,047 | 60.24% | 691 | 39.76% | 0 | 0.00% | 356 | 20.48% | 1,738 |
| Cherry | 1,683 | 67.03% | 828 | 32.97% | 0 | 0.00% | 855 | 34.05% | 2,511 |
| Cheyenne | 2,133 | 62.17% | 1,298 | 37.83% | 0 | 0.00% | 835 | 24.34% | 3,431 |
| Clay | 1,964 | 55.59% | 1,569 | 44.41% | 0 | 0.00% | 395 | 11.18% | 3,533 |
| Colfax | 2,395 | 60.15% | 1,587 | 39.85% | 0 | 0.00% | 808 | 20.29% | 3,982 |
| Cuming | 2,814 | 65.56% | 1,478 | 34.44% | 0 | 0.00% | 1,336 | 31.13% | 4,292 |
| Custer | 2,617 | 54.35% | 2,198 | 45.65% | 0 | 0.00% | 419 | 8.70% | 4,815 |
| Dakota | 2,501 | 58.28% | 1,790 | 41.72% | 0 | 0.00% | 711 | 16.57% | 4,291 |
| Dawes | 1,988 | 65.42% | 1,050 | 34.55% | 1 | 0.03% | 938 | 30.87% | 3,039 |
| Dawson | 3,673 | 58.34% | 2,623 | 41.66% | 0 | 0.00% | 1,050 | 16.68% | 6,296 |
| Deuel | 780 | 69.27% | 346 | 30.73% | 0 | 0.00% | 434 | 38.54% | 1,126 |
| Dixon | 2,088 | 72.20% | 804 | 27.80% | 0 | 0.00% | 1,284 | 44.40% | 2,892 |
| Dodge | 6,748 | 59.15% | 4,661 | 40.85% | 0 | 0.00% | 2,087 | 18.29% | 11,409 |
| Douglas | 57,371 | 49.06% | 59,439 | 50.83% | 126 | 0.11% | -2,068 | -1.77% | 116,936 |
| Dundy | 703 | 61.34% | 443 | 38.66% | 0 | 0.00% | 260 | 22.69% | 1,146 |
| Fillmore | 2,153 | 61.16% | 1,367 | 38.84% | 0 | 0.00% | 786 | 22.33% | 3,520 |
| Franklin | 1,005 | 51.54% | 945 | 48.46% | 0 | 0.00% | 60 | 3.08% | 1,950 |
| Frontier | 823 | 60.38% | 540 | 39.62% | 0 | 0.00% | 283 | 20.76% | 1,363 |
| Furnas | 1,541 | 58.04% | 1,114 | 41.96% | 0 | 0.00% | 427 | 16.08% | 2,655 |
| Gage | 4,700 | 58.19% | 3,377 | 41.81% | 0 | 0.00% | 1,323 | 16.38% | 8,077 |
| Garden | 799 | 65.28% | 425 | 34.72% | 0 | 0.00% | 374 | 30.56% | 1,224 |
| Garfield | 604 | 58.70% | 425 | 41.30% | 0 | 0.00% | 179 | 17.40% | 1,029 |
| Gosper | 443 | 52.36% | 403 | 47.64% | 0 | 0.00% | 40 | 4.73% | 846 |
| Grant | 349 | 74.57% | 119 | 25.43% | 0 | 0.00% | 230 | 49.15% | 468 |
| Greeley | 599 | 41.77% | 835 | 58.23% | 0 | 0.00% | -236 | -16.46% | 1,434 |
| Hall | 6,658 | 50.28% | 6,584 | 49.72% | 0 | 0.00% | 74 | 0.56% | 13,242 |
| Hamilton | 1,901 | 56.95% | 1,437 | 43.05% | 0 | 0.00% | 464 | 13.90% | 3,338 |
| Harlan | 1,028 | 49.12% | 1,065 | 50.88% | 0 | 0.00% | -37 | -1.77% | 2,093 |
| Hayes | 408 | 61.26% | 258 | 38.74% | 0 | 0.00% | 150 | 22.52% | 666 |
| Hitchcock | 883 | 60.77% | 570 | 39.23% | 0 | 0.00% | 313 | 21.54% | 1,453 |
| Holt | 2,741 | 60.40% | 1,797 | 39.60% | 0 | 0.00% | 944 | 20.80% | 4,538 |
| Hooker | 252 | 70.79% | 104 | 29.21% | 0 | 0.00% | 148 | 41.57% | 356 |
| Howard | 1,134 | 47.45% | 1,256 | 52.55% | 0 | 0.00% | -122 | -5.10% | 2,390 |
| Jefferson | 2,475 | 62.63% | 1,477 | 37.37% | 0 | 0.00% | 998 | 25.25% | 3,952 |
| Johnson | 1,473 | 58.18% | 1,059 | 41.82% | 0 | 0.00% | 414 | 16.35% | 2,532 |
| Kearney | 1,340 | 46.87% | 1,519 | 53.13% | 0 | 0.00% | -179 | -6.26% | 2,859 |
| Keith | 1,808 | 58.38% | 1,289 | 41.62% | 0 | 0.00% | 519 | 16.76% | 3,097 |
| Keya Paha | 414 | 71.26% | 167 | 28.74% | 0 | 0.00% | 247 | 42.51% | 581 |
| Kimball | 1,329 | 68.54% | 610 | 31.46% | 0 | 0.00% | 719 | 37.08% | 1,939 |
| Knox | 3,037 | 74.77% | 1,025 | 25.23% | 0 | 0.00% | 2,012 | 49.53% | 4,062 |
| Lancaster | 32,545 | 59.69% | 21,979 | 40.31% | 0 | 0.00% | 10,566 | 19.38% | 54,524 |
| Lincoln | 4,887 | 46.42% | 5,635 | 53.53% | 5 | 0.05% | -748 | -7.11% | 10,527 |
| Logan | 201 | 50.63% | 196 | 49.37% | 0 | 0.00% | 5 | 1.26% | 397 |
| Loup | 271 | 55.31% | 219 | 44.69% | 0 | 0.00% | 52 | 10.61% | 490 |
| Madison | 6,270 | 69.30% | 2,777 | 30.70% | 0 | 0.00% | 3,493 | 38.61% | 9,047 |
| McPherson | 140 | 56.45% | 108 | 43.55% | 0 | 0.00% | 32 | 12.90% | 248 |
| Merrick | 1,625 | 54.70% | 1,346 | 45.30% | 0 | 0.00% | 279 | 9.39% | 2,971 |
| Morrill | 1,136 | 63.57% | 651 | 36.43% | 0 | 0.00% | 485 | 27.14% | 1,787 |
| Nance | 970 | 49.31% | 997 | 50.69% | 0 | 0.00% | -27 | -1.37% | 1,967 |
| Nemaha | 2,109 | 63.81% | 1,196 | 36.19% | 0 | 0.00% | 913 | 27.62% | 3,305 |
| Nuckolls | 1,336 | 47.51% | 1,476 | 52.49% | 0 | 0.00% | -140 | -4.98% | 2,812 |
| Otoe | 3,311 | 59.74% | 2,230 | 40.24% | 1 | 0.02% | 1,081 | 19.51% | 5,542 |
| Pawnee | 1,140 | 63.62% | 652 | 36.38% | 0 | 0.00% | 488 | 27.23% | 1,792 |
| Perkins | 878 | 55.36% | 708 | 44.64% | 0 | 0.00% | 170 | 10.72% | 1,586 |
| Phelps | 2,291 | 57.84% | 1,667 | 42.09% | 3 | 0.08% | 624 | 15.75% | 3,961 |
| Pierce | 2,327 | 75.60% | 748 | 24.30% | 3 | 0.10% | 1,579 | 51.30% | 3,078 |
| Platte | 5,150 | 51.89% | 4,774 | 48.11% | 0 | 0.00% | 376 | 3.79% | 9,924 |
| Polk | 1,479 | 55.58% | 1,182 | 44.42% | 0 | 0.00% | 297 | 11.16% | 2,661 |
| Red Willow | 2,314 | 62.91% | 1,364 | 37.09% | 0 | 0.00% | 950 | 25.83% | 3,678 |
| Richardson | 2,667 | 56.60% | 2,045 | 43.40% | 0 | 0.00% | 622 | 13.20% | 4,712 |
| Rock | 573 | 63.46% | 330 | 36.54% | 0 | 0.00% | 243 | 26.91% | 903 |
| Saline | 2,705 | 53.33% | 2,367 | 46.67% | 0 | 0.00% | 338 | 6.66% | 5,072 |
| Sarpy | 7,417 | 48.82% | 7,740 | 50.94% | 37 | 0.24% | -323 | -2.13% | 15,194 |
| Saunders | 3,656 | 55.16% | 2,968 | 44.78% | 4 | 0.06% | 688 | 10.38% | 6,628 |
| Scotts Bluff | 5,227 | 60.23% | 3,449 | 39.74% | 2 | 0.02% | 1,778 | 20.49% | 8,678 |
| Seward | 3,266 | 64.79% | 1,775 | 35.21% | 0 | 0.00% | 1,491 | 29.58% | 5,041 |
| Sheridan | 1,733 | 72.39% | 661 | 27.61% | 0 | 0.00% | 1,072 | 44.78% | 2,394 |
| Sherman | 757 | 39.24% | 1,172 | 60.76% | 0 | 0.00% | -415 | -21.51% | 1,929 |
| Sioux | 522 | 68.59% | 239 | 31.41% | 0 | 0.00% | 283 | 37.19% | 761 |
| Stanton | 1,379 | 70.14% | 587 | 29.86% | 0 | 0.00% | 792 | 40.28% | 1,966 |
| Thayer | 1,848 | 62.54% | 1,107 | 37.46% | 0 | 0.00% | 741 | 25.08% | 2,955 |
| Thomas | 312 | 68.87% | 141 | 31.13% | 0 | 0.00% | 171 | 37.75% | 453 |
| Thurston | 1,125 | 62.81% | 666 | 37.19% | 0 | 0.00% | 459 | 25.63% | 1,791 |
| Valley | 1,356 | 53.92% | 1,159 | 46.08% | 0 | 0.00% | 197 | 7.83% | 2,515 |
| Washington | 2,896 | 56.72% | 2,204 | 43.16% | 6 | 0.12% | 692 | 13.55% | 5,106 |
| Wayne | 2,322 | 73.09% | 855 | 26.91% | 0 | 0.00% | 1,467 | 46.18% | 3,177 |
| Webster | 1,057 | 48.89% | 1,105 | 51.11% | 0 | 0.00% | -48 | -2.22% | 2,162 |
| Wheeler | 234 | 49.79% | 236 | 50.21% | 0 | 0.00% | -2 | -0.43% | 470 |
| York | 3,832 | 68.21% | 1,786 | 31.79% | 0 | 0.00% | 2,046 | 36.42% | 5,618 |
