= Senator Bauer =

Senator Bauer may refer to:

- Albert Bauer (1928–2021), Washington State Senate
- André Bauer (born 1969), South Carolina State Senate
- Carl W. Bauer (1933–2013), Louisiana State Senate
- Hal Bauer (1927–1993), Nebraska State Senate
- Stanley J. Bauer (1913–1972), New York State Senate
