= Rex Haberman =

American politician (1924–1999)

Member of the Nebraska Legislature from the 44th district
- In office January 3, 1979 – January 4, 1995
- Preceded by: Shirley Parks
- Succeeded by: Owen Elmer

Personal details
- Born: January 23, 1924 Friend, Nebraska
- Died: April 1, 1999 (aged 75) Imperial, Nebraska
- Party: Republican
- Spouse: Phyllis L. Kavan (m. 1948)
- Children: 4 (Mary Lou, George, Rex II, Phillip)
- Education: University of Nebraska; Colorado State University
- Occupation: Farm management, photographer

Rex Haberman (January 23, 1924 – April 1, 1999) was a Republican politician from Nebraska who served as a member of the Nebraska Legislature from the 44th district from 1979 to 1995.

== Early life ==
Haberman was born in 1924, in Friend, Nebraska, and graduated from Friend High School. Haberman attended the University of Nebraska and Colorado State University, and served in the U.S. Air Force during World War II. He worked as a photographer and a farm manager, and later served on the Imperial City Council and the Adams County Board of Supervisors.

== Nebraska Legislature ==
In 1978, State Senator Jack Mills declined to seek re-election, and Haberman ran to succeed him in the 44th district, which was based in western Nebraska and included Arthur, Chase, Deuel, Dundy, Garden, Hitchcock, Keith, and Perkins counties. In the nonpartisan primary, he faced former State Senator Ramey Whitney. Haberman narrowly placed first over Whitney in the primary, receiving 53 percent of the vote to Whitney's 47 percent. In the general election, Haberman defeated Whitney, winning 55–45 percent.

Haberman ran for re-election in 1982, and was re-elected unopposed. He sought a third term in 1986, He was challenged by Sandra Grothman McDermott, an agribusiness executive, and placed first in the primary by a wide margin, receiving 66 percent of the vote to McDermott's 34 percent. However, on August 7, 1986, McDermott dropped out of the race, citing personal reasons, and Haberman was re-elected unopposed in the general election.

In 1990, Haberman ran for a fourth term, and was challenged by attorney Judith Owens. He only narrowly placed first in the primary, receiving 54 percent of the vote to Owens's 46 percent. They advanced to the general election, where Haberman defeated Owens, winning 53–47 percent.

Following redistricting, State Senator Owen Elmer, who represented the 38th district, was moved into the 44th district, and he ran for re-election there in 1994. Haberman declined to seek a fifth term, instead opting to retire from the legislature.

== Death ==
Haberman died April 1, 1999.
