= Ramey Whitney =

American politician (1908–1988)

Member of the Nebraska Legislature from the 44th district
- In office January 5, 1965 – January 8, 1975
- Preceded by: District created
- Succeeded by: Jack Mills

Personal details
- Born: November 16, 1908 Elba, Nebraska
- Died: February 17, 1988 (aged 79) Lincoln, Nebraska
- Party: Republican
- Spouse: Doris E. Bemis (m. 1931)
- Children: 2 (Charles, Charlene)
- Education: University of Nebraska (B.S., M.A.); University of Minnesota (Ph.D.)
- Occupation: Agricultural economics professor

Ramey C. Whitney (November 16, 1908 – February 17, 1988) was a Republican politician from Nebraska who served as a member of the Nebraska Legislature from the 44th district from 1965 to 1975.

== Early life ==
Whitney was born in Elba, Nebraska in 1908, and graduated from Deuel County High School. He attended the University of Nebraska, receiving his bachelor's and master's degrees in economics. Whitney then attended the University of Minnesota, graduating with his doctorate, and subsequently taught economics at the University of Nebraska, University of Missouri, and University of Colorado. He retired from teaching to tend to his farm, and in 1958, he was elected Mayor of Chappell, narrowly defeating incumbent Mayor Chris Christensen. He was re-elected without opposition in 1960.

== Nebraska Legislature ==
In 1962, Whitney ran for the state legislature from the 39th district, which was based in western Nebraska, challenging incumbent State Senator Lewis Webb for re-election. In the nonpartisan primary, he finished third, receiving 22 percent of the vote to Webb's 32 percent and former Congressman Donald McGinley's 38 percent. McGinley ultimately defeated Webb.

Following redistricting in 1964, McGinley ran for re-election in the newly created 44th district, and he was challenged by Whitney and car dealer Bud Clemens. Whitney narrowly placed first in the primary election, receiving 45 percent of the vote to McGinley's 39 percent and Clemens's 15 percent. Whitney and McGinley advanced to the general election, but on August 24, 1964, McGinley announced that he was dropping out of the race, citing his need to focus attention on his family's business. Clemens automatically filled McGinley's place on the ballot. Whitney defeated Clemens in a landslide, receiving 65 percent of the vote to his 35 percent.

Whitney ran for re-election in 1966, and was re-elected without opposition.

In 1970, Whitney sought a third term, and was challenged by attorney William Padley, rancher Jack Brogan, and former Paxton Village Board member Marvin Platt. In the primary election, Whitney placed first in the primary, receiving 43 percent of the vote to Padley's 24 percent. They advanced to the general election, where Whitney defeated Padley by a wide margin, winning 62–38 percent.

Whitney declined to seek a fourth term in 1974, and was succeeded by Jack Mills.

In 1978, Mills did not run for re-election, and Whitney ran to succeed him. In the primary, he faced former Adams County Supervisor Rex Haberman. Whitney narrowly placed second in the primary, winning 47 percent of the vote to Haberman's 53 percent, and in the general election, was ultimately defeated, 55–45 percent.

== Death ==
Whitney died on February 17, 1988.
