= David Karnes =

American politician (1948–2020)

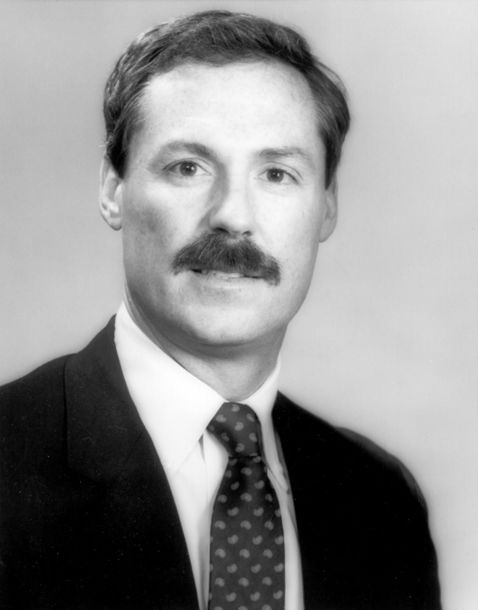

United States Senator from Nebraska
- In office March 11, 1987 – January 3, 1989
- Appointed by: Kay Orr
- Preceded by: Edward Zorinsky
- Succeeded by: Bob Kerrey

Personal details
- Born: David Kemp Karnes; December 12, 1948 Omaha, Nebraska, U.S.
- Died: October 25, 2020 (aged 71) Boston, Massachusetts, U.S.
- Party: Republican
- Spouses: Elizabeth Lueder (m. 1971; died 2003); Kristine Dorn (m. 2008)
- Children: 6
- Education: University of Nebraska–Lincoln (BA, JD)

David Kemp Karnes (December 12, 1948 – October 25, 2020) was an American politician, businessman, and attorney. He was a United States senator from Nebraska from 1987 to 1989, and was president and chief executive officer of The Fairmont Group Incorporated, a merchant banking/consulting company with offices in Omaha and the District of Columbia. Karnes also served in an "of counsel" capacity to the national law firm of Kutak Rock and practiced out of the firm's Omaha, Nebraska and Washington, D.C. offices. Karnes was also involved in numerous civic, educational, and charitable organizations both in Nebraska and nationally.

== Early life ==
Karnes was born in Omaha, Nebraska. He attended Benson High School and the University of Nebraska in Lincoln, where he was a member of the swimming team and graduated in 1971. As an undergrad he joined Beta Theta Pi fraternity, serving one term as chapter president. He remained in Lincoln to attend law school.

In 1981, Karnes was selected and served as a White House Fellow, only the second Nebraskan to achieve that honor. Following his tenure at the White House, in 1982 Karnes became executive assistant to the Under Secretary of Housing and Urban Development under President Ronald Reagan and subsequently served as special counsel for the Federal Home Loan Bank Board.

In 1983 he became chairman of the Federal Home Loan Bank of Topeka Board of Directors, serving in that capacity from 1983 to 1987. During that time he also served as general counsel for an agribusiness and merchandising firm.

== U.S. Senate ==
=== Appointment ===
On March 11, 1987, Governor Kay A. Orr appointed him as a Republican to the United States Senate to fill the vacancy in the Senate term ending January 3, 1989, caused by the death of Edward Zorinsky. The appointment shocked many observers as the 38-year old Karnes was virtually unknown in Nebraska political circles. He became known to Orr by working on her campaign for governor the previous year.

=== Tenure ===
While in the Senate, Karnes served on the Banking Committee, including its Securities and Consumer Credit subcommittees, as well as the Agriculture Committee and Small Business Committees. Karnes's areas of principal activity included federal, state, and international relations, corporate law, real estate, and financial institutions.

His governmental and later business experience involved many areas which were germane to Kutak Rock's finance and structured transaction practices, as well as a very broad range of clients and special issues. He also was one of the principals of the firm's technology, venture capital, and emerging companies national practice group. He served in senior executive positions in federal executive, regulatory, and legislative bodies and had broad expertise and familiarity with state and federal agency operations, including the White House, the United States Department of Housing and Urban Development, and the Federal Home Loan Bank Board.

At the state level, Karnes served as the attorney in charge of the firm's engagement as special tax counsel to the Nebraska Legislature as it revised the state's personal property tax system and, more recently, served as counsel to the State in the development and implementation of Nebraska's Section 529 College Savings Plan. He was a member of the board of directors of the $35 billion Federal Home Loan Bank of Topeka, a principal secured credit source for saving and loans, savings banks, commercial banks, credit unions, and insurance companies in Nebraska, Colorado, Oklahoma, and Kansas.

=== 1988 election ===
Running in his own right in 1988, Karnes successfully captured the Republican nomination against Congressman Hal Daub, but lost to former governor Bob Kerrey, a Democrat, in the general election. Kerrey won by a margin of 100,467 votes, taking 57% to Karnes's 42%. Karnes made a memorable faux pas when, during a campaign stop at the Nebraska State Fair, he said, "What this nation needs is fewer farmers."

Although President George W. Bush personally encouraged him to run for the Senate again in 2006, Karnes never again ran for public office.

== Post political career ==
Karnes served on the boards of, or acted as an advisor to, publicly traded U.S. companies, including Fannie Mae, Data Transmission Network Corporation, and RJT Securities, Inc.

He served on the Omaha Airport Authority board, and was a director of several private companies, including Frontier Bank, FSB of Park City, Utah, El Paseo Bank of Palm Desert, California, Orion Healthcare Corporation (healthcare technology), Waitt Media, Inc. (broadcasting, commercial advertising and entertainment), Tri Med Research, Inc. (medical technology), Farnam Group, Inc. (multifamily real estate development), Regency Court, L.L.C. (retail real estate), and Big Red Companies, Inc. (gaming and technology).

Karnes' additional affiliations included the Advisory Board of Financial Institutions Partners II ($100 million financial services hedge fund), the University of Nebraska Technology Park L.L.C. (director and executive committee), eOne Group, Inc. (web development and systems integration) (director), and Solutionary, Inc. (data, internet and systems security) (director).

Karnes served as a member of the United States Advisory Committee on Trade Policy and Negotiations. This committee is appointed by the president and is composed of chief executive officers of 40 of America's largest corporations as well as presidents of key agriculture and labor organizations. The Committee, established by the U.S. Congress in 1974, is the principal trade advisory group representing America's private sector to the president and Congress on all trade issues such as the Uruguay Round of the General Agreement on Tariffs and Trade (GATT), the World Trade Organization, and the North American Free Trade Agreement.

In January 2016, Karnes endorsed New Jersey governor Chris Christie for president in that year's election.

== Personal life and death ==
He was married to Elizabeth Karnes from 1971 to her death in 2003; they had four daughters. On June 14, 2008, Karnes married Kristine Dorn, a partner at Kutak Rock and 1998 Graduate of Creighton University School of Law. They had two children together.

In 2019, Karnes was diagnosed with metastatic squamous cell skin cancer. He was part of a clinical trial in Boston, Massachusetts, but treatment was unsuccessful, and he died there on October 25, 2020, at age 71.

Party political offices
Preceded by Jim Keck	Republican nominee for U.S. Senator from Nebraska (Class 1); 1988	Succeeded by Jan Stoney
U.S. Senate
Preceded by Edward Zorinsky	U.S. Senator (Class 1) from Nebraska; 1987–1989; Served alongside: J. James Exon	Succeeded by Bob Kerrey
Honorary titles
Preceded by Don Nickles	Baby of the United States Senate; 1987–1989	Succeeded by Don Nickles
