= Helen Boosalis =

American politician

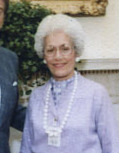
- Boosalis with President Ronald Reagan in 1981

44th Mayor of Lincoln
- In office May 19, 1975 – May 16, 1983
- Preceded by: Sam Schwartzkopf
- Succeeded by: Roland Luedtke

39th President of the United States Conference of Mayors
- In office 1981–1982
- Preceded by: Richard Hatcher
- Succeeded by: Coleman Young

Personal details
- Born: Helen Geankoplis; August 28, 1919 Minneapolis, Minnesota, U.S.
- Died: June 15, 2009 (aged 89) Lincoln, Nebraska, U.S.
- Party: Democratic
- Spouse: Michael G. Boosalis (m. 1945)
- Children: Mary Beth Boosalis
- Education: University of Minnesota, Twin Cities (BA)

Helen Boosalis (née Geankoplis; August 28, 1919 – June 15, 2009) was an American Democratic Party politician from Nebraska.

== Early life ==
Helen Boosalis was born as Helen Geankoplis in Minneapolis, Minnesota, to Greek immigrant parents, where she grew up working in her father's Minneapolis restaurant. In 1945 she married Michael Gus "Mike" Boosalis, a World War II veteran and graduate of the University of Minnesota. Their daughter, Mary Beth, was born three years later. In 1951, the family moved to Lincoln, Nebraska, where her husband had accepted a job at the University of Nebraska.

== Career ==
In 1959 Boosalis was elected to the Lincoln City Council, scoring an upset victory over an incumbent, and was subsequently reelected three times. She won another upset victory over incumbent Sam Schwartzkopf to become the city's first woman mayor in 1975. From 1981 to 1982, she served as the first female President of the U.S. Conference of Mayors.

Shortly after completing her tenure as Mayor in 1983, Boosalis was appointed as Director of the Nebraska Department of Aging in the Cabinet of then-Governor Bob Kerrey. She served in that post until she announced her candidacy for Governor of Nebraska in the 1986 election. Boosalis received a plurality of the vote in the crowded Democratic primary with 43.8% of the votes.

Democratic gubernatorial primary results, May 13, 1986
Party	Candidate	Votes	%
Democratic	Helen Boosalis	63,830	44.01
Democratic	David Domina	37,975	26.18
Democratic	Chris Beutler	31,605	21.79
Democratic	Robert Prokop	5,160	3.56
Democratic	Marge Higgins	4,433	3.06
Democratic	Barton Chandler	1,260	.87
Democratic	Mina Dillingham	402	.28
Democratic	Write-in	369	.25

In the primary, Boosalis carried 77 of Nebraska's 93 counties, Domina carried 16 counties in the Northeast section of the state, and Beutler carried no counties.

Boosalis went on to lose to the Republican candidate, State Treasurer Kay A. Orr, in the general election. Boosalis received 47.1% of the vote, and Orr received 52.9%. This election was the first state gubernatorial election in U.S. history where the candidates of both major national parties were women.

=== Post-politics ===
Following her electoral defeat, Boosalis was an active member of several state and national organizations, most notably serving as Chairwoman of Board of Directors of the American Association of Retired Persons.

== Personal life ==
Boosalis died from a brain tumor on June 15, 2009, at the age of 89.

== Sources ==
1. "Boosalis, Helen". The Political Graveyard.

Political offices
Preceded by Sam Schwartzkopf	Mayor of Lincoln; 1975–1983	Succeeded by Roland Luedtke
Party political offices
Preceded by Bob Kerrey	Democratic nominee for Governor of Nebraska; 1986	Succeeded by Ben Nelson
