= Monolith Inc. =

American chemical manufacturer

- Industry: Chemical and materials production
- Founded: 2012 in Redwood City, United States
- Founders: Robert Hanson; Pete Johnson
- Headquarters: Lincoln, Nebraska, United States
- Products: Carbon black, anhydrous ammonia, hydrogen
- Number of employees: 200 (2022)
- Website: https://monolith-corp.com/

Monolith Inc. (formerly Boxer Industries) is an American chemical and materials producer based in Lincoln, Nebraska. The company is known for being the first company to use methane pyrolysis to split natural gas into carbon and hydrogen gas on a commercial scale. The carbon resulting from the process is converted into carbon black. The company is building a plant where the hydrogen gas from the process will be converted to anhydrous ammonia. Monolith was founded by Robert Hanson and Pete Johnson in 2012, in Redwood City, California.

== Overview ==
Monolith is a clean technology startup that produces chemical compounds and commodities using natural gas. It has a corporate office in Lincoln, Nebraska, as well as a research and development center, where it studies and analyzes carbon black's properties. As of January 2022, the company employed 200 people. The company uses a process called methane pyrolysis to break apart natural gas molecules into carbon and hydrogen by heating them without exposure to oxygen. The carbon created by the process is converted into carbon black, and Monolith is building a plant where the hydrogen gas will be converted to ammonia using the Haber-Bosch process. SK Inc., a minority stake holder in Monolith, described their process of hydrogen production as sitting somewhere between green hydrogen gas produced through hydrolysis and blue hydrogen, which uses fossil fuels and carbon capture to eliminate emissions. According to the Associated Press, Monolith was the first company to use methane pyrolysis in the production of carbon black. The Wall Street Journal reported that Monolith's process creates approximately 95% fewer emissions than traditional methods.

== History ==
=== Founding and pilot plant ===
Monolith was originally founded as Boxer Industries in 2012 by Robert Hanson and Pete Johnson. Forbes reported that Hanson and Johnson did not have a specific plan when they started the company, but a goal of "finding a business idea that was both environmentally transformative and financially sustainable".

Boxer Industries raised US$10 million in 2013, and in 2014, it received approval for its pilot plant in the Port of Redwood City. It was the first carbon black plant built in the US in 30 years. Monolith chose the location for its industrial land, and access to Silicon Valley. There, it piloted its process for creating carbon black, a powder typically made from crude oil that is used to reinforce rubber products and as a pigment. The port approved the plant with a "mitigated negative declaration" following its California Environmental Quality Act review. The company said impacts from the project would be mitigated to an acceptable level, and that the only emissions were from construction and below the air quality management district's acceptable levels. The original plant was expected to produce 190 metric tons of carbon black annually and employed a staff of up to four, with 11 offsite engineers.

=== Relocation ===
In 2015, the company announced that it was building a new plant near Hallam, Nebraska, named Olive Creek, with the capacity to produce approximately 14,000 tons of carbon black annually. Monolith broke ground on the facility in 2016, after investigating 18 potential locations across the US and Canada. The company also announced an agreement to provide the hydrogen gas it generated to the Nebraska Public Power District (NPPD). The plan was to retrofit the Sheldon Power Station to burn hydrogen instead of coal. However, the retrofitting project was later scrapped due to its cost and complexity. Hanson said an alternative use had been found, and the company later announced the hydrogen gas would be converted to anhydrous ammonia and sold as fertilizer. In 2018, the company moved its headquarters from California to Nebraska. Bob Kerrey, who formerly served as a US senator and as Nebraska's governor, joined Monolith's board in 2019.

By 2020, the company had raised $274 million in funding. The Olive Creek facility was completed that year with a cost of $100 million. In June 2020, the company reported its proposed Olive Creek expansion would require 2.3 to 4.6 billion gallons of groundwater per year to operate, drawing criticism from the community and natural resource managers in the area. Hanson said that the initial water use estimates the company received from consultants were hurried, and that projected annual water needs had lowered to 450 to 800 million gallons. The expanded plant was expected to cost $1 billion, and produce an additional 180,000 tons of carbon black, 12 times more than the original Olive Creek plant, and include a place with capacity to produce 275,000 tons of anhydrous ammonia from hydrogen gas annually. In September that year, the original Olive Creek plant began production. On November 30, 2020, Mitsubishi Heavy Industries announced that it had invested in Monolith.

=== Expansion ===
In June 2021, the South Korean firm SK Inc. purchased a minority stake in Monolith, along with NextEra Energy. The Lower Platte South Natural Resources District approved three new wells in July 2021, allowing the company to pump up to 420 million gallons of water per year. The new wells cleared the way for the Olive Creek expansion, with the company estimating it would be complete by 2026. Some community members expressed concern about the expanded plant's water use in the case of a prolonged drought. Monolith noted that in such a case it would adjust its water usage. As part of the permits, the company is required to monitor and report several measurements related to water quality and availability. Like the original Olive Creek plant, the expansion will run entirely using sustainable energy and is also expected to reduce greenhouse gas emissions by up to 1 million metric tons compared to annual emissions from traditional carbon black and hydrogen gas production methods.

Monolith entered into an agreement with Goodyear Tire and Rubber Company in December 2021 to supply the tire maker with carbon black, which is used in approximately one third of all tires to improve durability. That month, the company also received a $1 billion loan guarantee from the United States Department of Energy to expand the Olive Creek Plant through a program to support expansion of clean energy production. It was the first non-nuclear loan issued from the program since 2016.

In July 2022, Monolith received another $300 million in funding, including investments by TPG's climate fund, and Decarbonization Partners, which is a collaboration between BlackRock and Temasek Holdings. The funding round brought the company's valuation over $1 billion, making it one of the sectors' largest startups.
