= 1994 United States Senate election in Nebraska =

- November 8, 1994
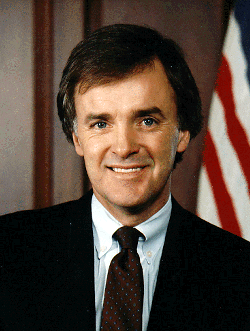

Nominee	Bob Kerrey	Jan Stoney
Party	Democratic	Republican
Popular vote	317,297	260,668
Percentage	54.78%	45.00%
- County results Kerrey: 50–60% 60–70% 70–80% Stoney: 50–60% 60–70% 70–80%
U.S. senator before election
Bob Kerrey
Democratic
Elected U.S. Senator
Bob Kerrey
Democratic

The 1994 Nebraska United States Senate election was held on November 8, 1994. Incumbent Democratic Senator Bob Kerrey ran for re-election to a second term. He was challenged in the general election by Republican nominee Jan Stoney, a retired telecommunications executive. Despite nationwide Republican gains, Kerrey won re-election by a comfortable margin.

== Democratic primary ==
=== Candidates ===
- Bob Kerrey, incumbent Senator

=== Results ===
Democratic primary results
Party	Candidate	Votes	%
Democratic	Bob Kerrey (inc.)	107,137	99.25%
Democratic	Write-ins	806	0.75%
Total votes		107,943	100.00%

== Republican primary ==
=== Candidates ===
- Jan Stoney, retired telecommunications executive
- Otis Glebe, perennial candidate

=== Results ===
Republican primary results
Party	Candidate	Votes	%
Republican	Jan Stoney	150,896	86.27%
Republican	Otis Glebe	23,796	13.60%
Republican	Write-ins	220	0.13%
Total votes		174,912	100.00%

== General election ==
1994 United States Senate election in Nebraska
Party	Candidate	Votes	%	±%
Democratic	Bob Kerrey (inc.)	317,297	54.78%	−1.92%
Republican	Jan Stoney	260,668	45.00%	+3.34%
Write-in		1,240	0.21%	—
Majority		56,629	9.78%	−5.27%
Total votes		579,205	100.00%	
Democratic hold				

== See also ==
- 1994 United States Senate elections
