= David E. Van Zandt =

American attorney, legal scholar, and academic administrator

David Van Zandt

8th President of The New School
- In office January 1, 2011 – April 15, 2020
- Preceded by: Bob Kerrey
- Succeeded by: Dwight A. McBride

Personal details
- Born: David Edgar Van Zandt Montgomery Township, New Jersey, U.S.
- Spouse: Lisa Huestis
- Children: 2
- Education: Princeton University (BA); Yale University (JD); London School of Economics (PhD)

David Van Zandt (born 1953) is an American attorney, legal scholar, and academic administrator. He served as president of The New School from January 2011 to April 15, 2020. He previously served as the dean of Northwestern University Pritzker School of Law from 1995 to 2011. He has taught courses in international financial markets, business associations, property, practical issues in business law, and legal realism.

== Early life and education ==
Van Zandt was born in 1953 in Montgomery, New Jersey, and raised in the state along with his three siblings. He graduated from Princeton University with a Bachelor of Arts degree in sociology. In 1981, he earned a Juris Doctor from Yale Law School, where he served as managing editor of the Yale Law Journal. He also earned a Ph.D. in sociology from the London School of Economics.

== Career ==
Van Zandt joined the Northwestern University faculty in 1985 and became dean in 1995.

He is also a member of the Council on Foreign Relations.

== Selected works ==
- "The Breadth of Life in the Law" (Cardozo Law Review, 1992)
- "An Alternative Theory of Practical Reason in Judicial Decisions" (Tulane Law Review 1991)
- "Commonsense Reasoning, Social Change, and the Law" (Northwestern Law Review 1987; M. Perry & R. Levin eds., Cambridge University Press, 1990)
- "Neutralizing the Regulatory Burden: The Use of Equity Securities by Foreign Corporate Acquirers" (Yale Law Journal, 1980)

== See also ==
- List of law clerks for the second seat of the Supreme Court of the United States
