= Lewis Webb =

American politician (1888–1973)

Member of the Nebraska Legislature from the 39th district
- In office January 6, 1959 – January 1, 1963
- Preceded by: Donald McGinley
- Succeeded by: Donald McGinley

Personal details
- Born: March 23, 1888 Drip Rock, Kentucky
- Died: June 17, 1973 (aged 85) Pawnee City, Nebraska
- Party: Republican
- Spouse: Edna Stinson (m. 1908)
- Children: 2
- Occupation: Contractor, highway inspector

Lewis Webb (March 23, 1888 – June 17, 1973) was an American Republican politician from Nebraska who served as a member of the Nebraska Legislature from the 39th district from 1959 to 1963.

== Early life ==
Webb was born in Drip Rock, Kentucky, in 1888, and moved to Fairbury, Nebraska, in 1908. He worked as a contractor; owned and operated Silent Night Rooms, a rooming house in Ogallala; and was an inspector for the state highway department.

== Nebraska Legislature ==
In 1958, State Senator Donald McGinley opted to successfully run for Congress rather than seek re-election. Webb ran to succeed him in the 39th district, which included Arthur, Blaine, Deuel, Garden, Grant, Hooker, Keith, Logan, McPherson, and Thomas counties. In the nonpartisan primary, Webb faced Keith County Sheriff Wayne Elliott, farmer Ed Prochaska, and rancher Jack Brogan. Webb placed first in the primary, winning 38 percent of the vote to Prochaska's 36 percent, and they advanced to the general election. Webb narrowly defeated Prochaska, winning 53–47 percent, and entered the legislature identifying as a Republican.

Webb ran for re-election in 1960, and was challenged by Brogan and farmer Dewey Jensen. Webb placed first in the primary by a wide margin, winning 48 percent of the vote to Brogan's 28 percent and Jensen's 24 percent, and he advanced to the general election with Brogan. Webb defeated Brogan, winning 57 percent of the vote to Brogan's 43 percent.

In 1962, Webb ran for a third term, and was challenged by former Congressman Donald McGinley, who was defeated for re-election in 1960; Chappell Mayor Ramey Whitney; and former Logan County Supervisor Robert McPherrin. In the primary election, McGinley placed first, winning 38 percent of the vote to Webb's 32 percent, and they advanced to the general election. McGinley narrowly defeated Webb, winning 51–49 percent.

== Death ==
Webb died on June 17, 1973.
