= David Martin (Nebraska politician) =

American politician (1907–1997)

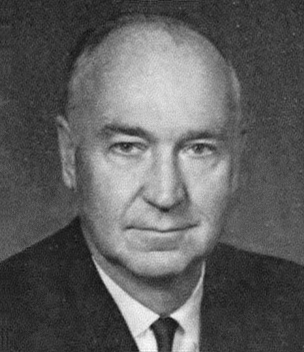

Member of the U.S. House of Representatives from Nebraska
- In office January 3, 1961 – December 31, 1974
- Preceded by: Donald McGinley
- Succeeded by: Virginia D. Smith
- Constituency: 4th district (1961-1963); 3rd district (1963-1974)

Personal details
- Born: July 9, 1907 Kearney, Nebraska
- Died: May 15, 1997 (aged 89) Kearney, Nebraska
- Party: Republican
- Education: Dartmouth College

David Thomas Martin (July 9, 1907 – May 15, 1997) was an American Republican Party politician who served seven terms in the United States House of Representatives from 1961 to 1974.

Martin was born in Kearney, Nebraska and graduated from Dartmouth College in 1929 before entering the lumber business. He was a member of the Nebraska Republican Committee and Republican National Committee in the 1950s; in 1954, he was an unsuccessful primary candidate for United States Senate.

Martin ran for Congress in 1960, defeating freshman Democrat Donald McGinley by a slim margin. He served as the minority chairman of the House Rules Committee and was also a member of the Education and Labor Committee. He was the ranking Republican on the Rules Committee in his last three terms. He cochaired with Rep. Richard Howard Ichord Jr. of Missouri the Select Committee on the Reorganization of the Congress in 1973-74. In 1974, he was a floor leader in the confirmation of Nelson Rockefeller, his Dartmouth classmate, as Vice President of the United States.

After leaving Congress, Martin became a member of the Nebraska State College Board and was a visiting professor at Kearney State College, now the University of Nebraska at Kearney. In 1980, he served as Nebraska chairman for the unsuccessful presidential bid of George H. W. Bush.

Martin died in his hometown of Kearney after suffering from pneumonia and a heart ailment at age 89.

U.S. House of Representatives
Preceded by Donald Francis McGinley (D)	United States Representative for the 4th Congressional District of Nebraska; 1961 - 1963	Succeeded by Seat merged
Preceded by Ralph F. Beermann (R)	United States Representative for the 3rd Congressional District of Nebraska; 1963 - 1974	Succeeded by Virginia Smith (R)
