= 1988 United States Senate election in Nebraska =

- November 8, 1988
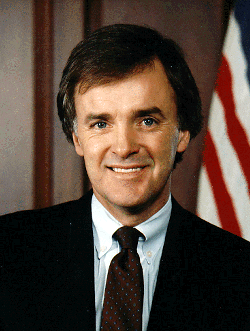

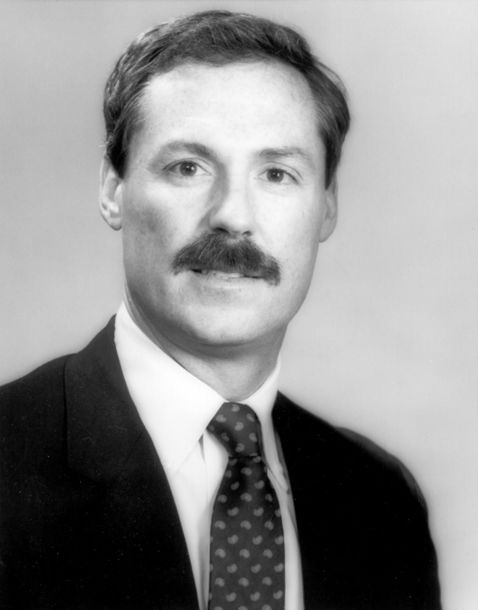
Nominee	Bob Kerrey	David Karnes
Party	Democratic	Republican
Popular vote	378,717	278,250
Percentage	56.71%	41.66%
- County results Kerrey: 40–50% 50–60% 60–70% 70–80% Karnes: 40–50% 50–60% 60–70% 70–80% Tie: 40–50%
U.S. senator before election
David Karnes
Republican
Elected U.S. Senator
Bob Kerrey
Democratic

The 1988 United States Senate election in Nebraska was held on November 8, 1988 to select the U.S. Senator from the state. Incumbent Republican Senator David Karnes, who was appointed to the Senate in 1987 upon the death of Democratic Senator Edward Zorinsky, sought election to his first full term. After beating back a challenge from Congressman Hal Daub in the Republican primary, Karnes advanced to the general election, where he faced former Governor Bob Kerrey, the Democratic nominee. Though Vice President George H. W. Bush, the Republican nominee for President, won Nebraska in a landslide, Karnes was ultimately defeated by Kerrey by a wide margin. This is the last time a Senator from Nebraska lost re-election.

== Democratic primary ==
=== Candidates ===
- Bob Kerrey, former Governor of Nebraska
- Ken L. Michaelis, disbarred attorney, 1986 Democratic candidate for Lieutenant Governor

=== Results ===
Democratic primary results
Party	Candidate	Votes	%
Democratic	Bob Kerrey	156,498	91.43%
Democratic	Ken L. Michaelis	14,248	8.32%
Democratic	Write-ins	423	0.25%
Total votes		171,169	100.00%

== Republican primary ==
Republican Primary results by county: Karnes: 50–60%; 60–70%; 70–80%; 80–90%; Daub: 50–60%; 60–70%

=== Candidates ===
- David Karnes, incumbent Senator
- Hal Daub, U.S. Representative from Nebraska's 2nd congressional district

=== Results ===
Republican primary results
Party	Candidate	Votes	%
Republican	David Karnes (inc.)	117,439	54.82%
Republican	Hal Daub	96,436	45.02%
Republican	Write-ins	350	0.16%
Total votes		214,225	100.00%

== General election ==
1988 United States Senate election in Nebraska
Party	Candidate	Votes	%	±%
Democratic	Bob Kerrey	378,717	56.71%	−9.88%
Republican	David Karnes (inc.)	278,250	41.66%	+13.12%
New Alliance	Ernie Chambers	10,372	1.55%	—
Write-in		521	0.08%	—
Majority		100,467	15.04%	−23.00%
Total votes		667,860	100.00%	
Democratic gain from Republican				

== See also ==
- 1988 United States Senate elections
