= Roland Luedtke =

American politician (1924–2005)

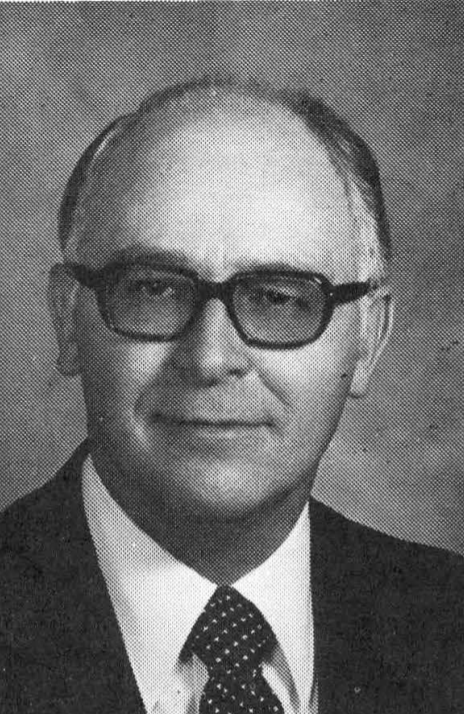

45th Mayor of Lincoln
- In office May 16, 1983 – May 18, 1987
- Preceded by: Helen Boosalis
- Succeeded by: Bill Harris

31st Lieutenant Governor of Nebraska
- In office January 4, 1979 – January 6, 1983
- Governor: Charles Thone
- Preceded by: Gerald Whelan
- Succeeded by: Donald McGinley

22nd Speaker of the Nebraska Legislature
- In office January 5, 1977 – January 3, 1979
- Preceded by: Jules Burbach
- Succeeded by: Richard D. Marvel

Member of the Nebraska Legislature from the 28th district
- In office January 3, 1967 – January 3, 1979
- Preceded by: Hal Bauer
- Succeeded by: Chris Beutler

Personal details
- Born: January 4, 1924 Lincoln, Nebraska
- Died: July 22, 2005 (aged 81) Lincoln, Nebraska
- Party: Republican
- Spouse: Helen D. Snyder
- Profession: Attorney

Roland Alfred Luedtke (January 4, 1924 – July 22, 2005) was an American politician who served as the 31st lieutenant governor of Nebraska from 1979 to 1983.

Luedtke was born in Lincoln, Nebraska, on January 4, 1924, to Alfred C. and Carolina (Senne) Luedtke. After graduating from Lincoln High School in 1942 he served in World War II in the U.S. Army. He then attended University of Nebraska–Lincoln and received a bachelor's degree in 1949 followed by a law degree.

Luedtke served as Nebraska Deputy Secretary of State from 1953 to 1959. In November 1966 he was first elected to the Nebraska Legislature. He became Speaker of the Legislature in 1977.

He was elected lieutenant governor and served in that position from 1979 to 1983. He was next elected as the mayor of Lincoln, serving from 1983 to 1987.

Luedtke married Helen D. Snyder on December 1, 1951, and they had two sons. He was diagnosed with Alzheimer's disease in his later years, and died on July 22, 2005.

Party political offices
Preceded by Anne Stuart Batchelder	Republican nominee for Lieutenant Governor of Nebraska; 1978, 1982	Succeeded by William E. Nichol
Political offices
Preceded by Gerald Whelan	Lieutenant Governor of Nebraska; 1979–1983	Succeeded by Donald McGinley
Preceded by Hal W. Bauer	Nebraska State Senator- District 28; 1967–1979	Succeeded by Chris Beutler
Preceded by Helen Boosalis	Mayor of Lincoln; 1983 to 1987	Succeeded by Bill Harris
