= 1978 United States Senate election in Nebraska =

- November 7, 1978
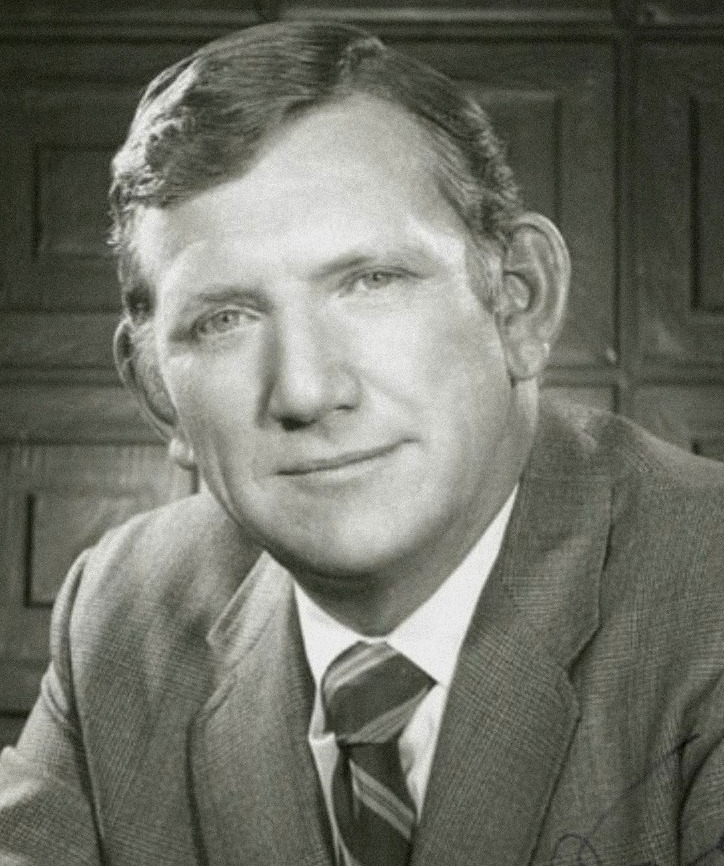

Nominee	J. James Exon	Donald Shasteen
Party	Democratic	Republican
Popular vote	334,276	159,806
Percentage	67.62%	32.33%
- County results Exon: 50–60% 60–70% 70–80% Shasteen: 50–60%
U.S. senator before election
Carl Curtis
Republican
Elected U.S. Senator
J. James Exon
Democratic

The 1978 United States Senate election in Nebraska was held on November 7, 1978. Incumbent Republican Senator Carl Curtis declined to seek re-election to a fifth term. Governor J. James Exon won the Democratic nomination uncontested and then faced Republican Donald Shasteen, an aide to Senator Curtis, in the general election. Despite nationwide Republican gains, Exon defeated Shasteen in a landslide, picking up the seat. Exon's victory made him the first Democrat to ever win the Class II Senate seat, and the first non-Republican to do so since George W. Norris's victory as an independent in 1936.

== Democratic primary ==
=== Candidates ===
- J. James Exon, Governor of Nebraska

=== Results ===
Democratic primary results
Party	Candidate	Votes	%
Democratic	J. J. Exon	127,142	99.35%
Democratic	Write-ins	828	0.65%
Total votes		127,970	100.00%

== Republican primary ==
=== Candidates ===
- Don Shasteen, aide to outgoing Senator Carl Curtis
- Lenore Etchison, perennial candidate

=== Results ===
Republican primary results
Party	Candidate	Votes	%
Republican	Don Shasteen	129,525	78.68%
Republican	Lenore Etchison	34,916	21.21%
Republican	Write-ins	174	0.11%
Total votes		164,615	100.00%

== General election ==
1978 United States Senate election in Nebraska
Party	Candidate	Votes	%	±%
Democratic	J. James Exon	334,276	67.62%	+20.85%
Republican	Donald Shasteen	159,806	32.33%	−20.76%
Write-in		286	0.06%	—
Majority		174,470	35.29%	+28.97%
Total votes		494,368	100.00%	
Democratic gain from Republican				

== See also ==
- 1978 United States Senate elections
