= Commission on Industrial Relations (Nebraska) =

The Commission on Industrial Relations is a tribunal dealing with labor disputes in Nebraska. It was called the Court of Industrial Relations (CIR) until 1979. It is authorized by the Nebraska State Constitution and was created by state legislation in 1947 as the Court of Industrial Relations. The court has withstood legal challenges. In 2018, legislative battles over it and the largely public union organizations it has jurisdiction over were taking place.

The court handles various matters including wage disputes, union representation certifications, and allegations of prohibited conduct against employers.

Donald McGinley became a judge in the Court of Industrial Relations in Lincoln, Nebraska from 1976 to 1980. Brad Ashford served as a judge on the Nebraska Commission on Industrial Relations from 1984 to 1986.
