= 1982 Nebraska gubernatorial election =

- November 2, 1982
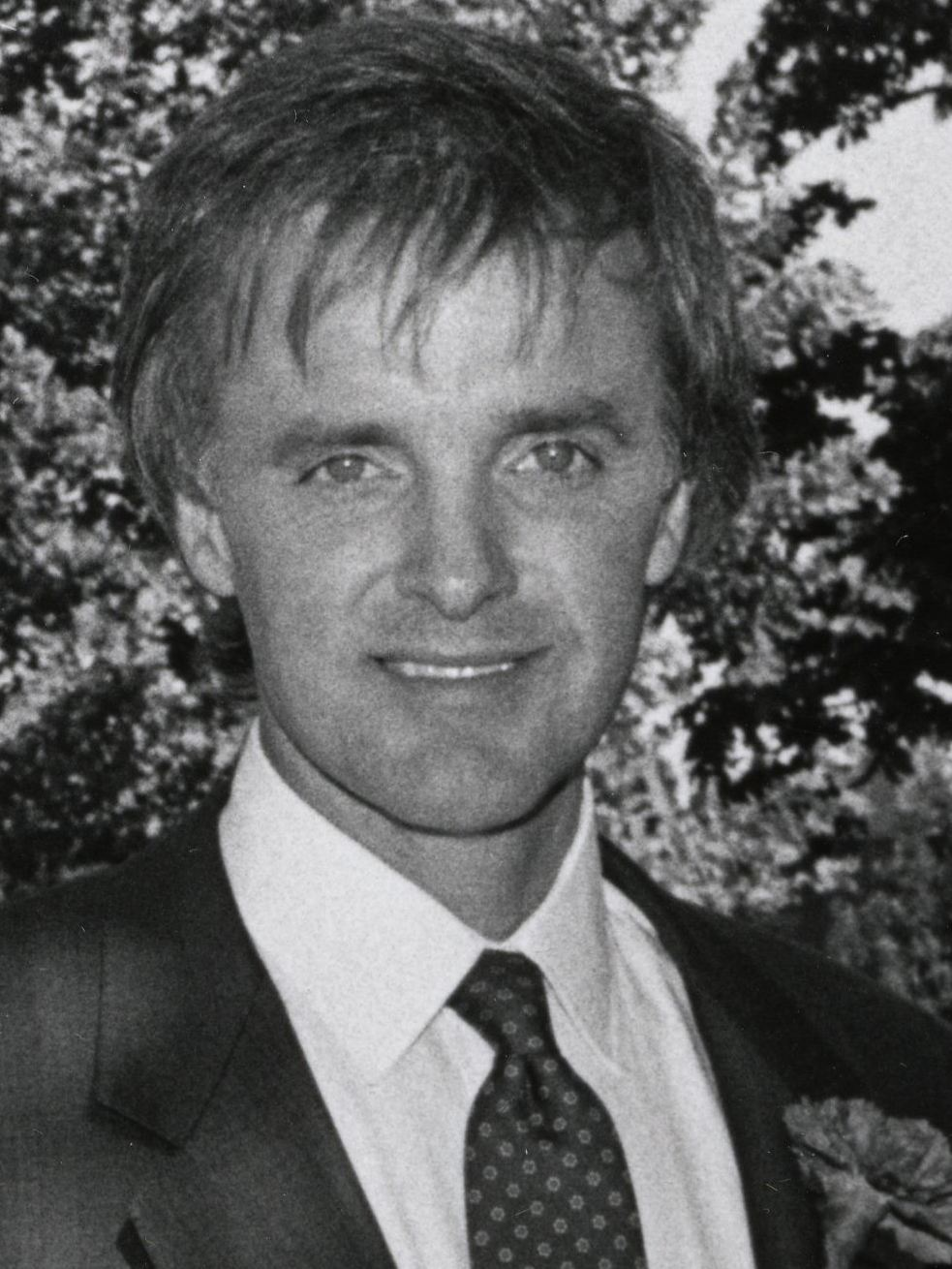

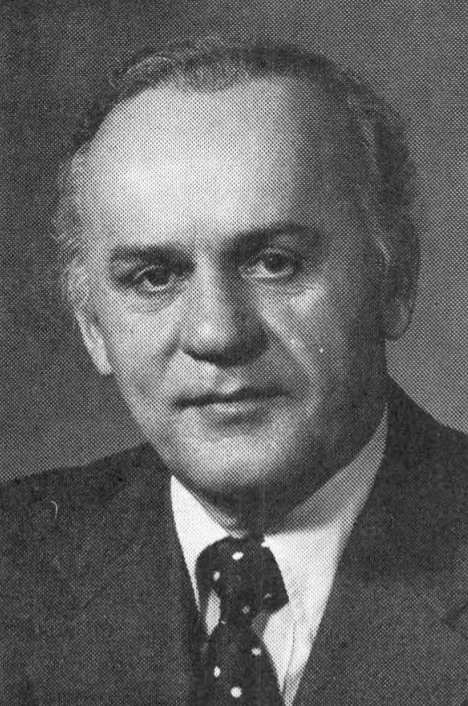
Nominee	Bob Kerrey	Charles Thone
Party	Democratic	Republican
Running mate	Donald McGinley	Roland Luedtke
Popular vote	277,436	270,203
Percentage	50.64%	49.32%
- County results Kerrey: 50–60% 60–70% Thone: 50–60% 60–70% 70–80% 80–90%
Governor before election
Charles Thone
Republican
Elected Governor
Bob Kerrey
Democratic

The 1982 Nebraska gubernatorial election was held on November 2, 1982, and featured businessman Bob Kerrey, a Democrat, narrowly defeating incumbent Republican governor Charles Thone.

== Democratic primary ==
=== Governor ===
==== Candidates ====
- George B. Burrows, Nebraska state senator
- Bob Kerrey, businessman and Vietnam War veteran

==== Results ====
Democratic gubernatorial primary results
Party	Candidate	Votes	%
Democratic	Bob Kerrey	87,913	70.98
Democratic	George "Bill" Burrows	35,426	28.60
Democratic	Write-in	514	0.42

=== Lieutenant governor ===
==== Candidates ====
- Edward Conradt, political newcomer who was a tower operator and clerk for Burlington Northern Railroad from Lincoln, Nebraska
- Donald F. McGinley, former United States Representative from 1959 to 1961 and former member of the Nebraska Legislature in what was then District 39 from 1955 to 1959 and 1963 to 1965 from Ogallala, Nebraska.

==== Results ====
Democratic lieutenant gubernatorial primary results
Party	Candidate	Votes	%
Democratic	Donald F. McGinley	67,047	65.61
Democratic	Edward Conradt	34,901	34.15
Democratic	Write-in	239	0.23

== Republican primary ==
=== Governor ===
==== Candidates ====
- Barton E. Chandler
- Stan Deboer
- Charles Thone, incumbent governor

==== Results ====
Republican gubernatorial primary results
Party	Candidate	Votes	%
Republican	Charles Thone (incumbent)	115,750	62.49
Republican	Stan Deboer	55,983	30.22
Republican	Barton E. Chandler	13,086	7.06
Republican	Write-in	426	0.23

=== Lieutenant governor ===
==== Candidates ====
- Howard A. Lamb, member of the Nebraska Legislature in District 43 since 1977 from Anselmo, Nebraska.
- Roland Luedtke, incumbent Nebraska Lieutenant Governor
- Ken Smith, farmer from Ithaca, Nebraska, and Saunders County supervisor

==== Results ====
Republican lieutenant gubernatorial primary results
Party	Candidate	Votes	%
Republican	Roland Luedtke (incumbent)	90,922	53.27
Republican	Howard A. Lamb	57,871	33.90
Republican	Ken Smith	21,822	12.78
Republican	Write-in	81	0.05

== General election ==
=== Results ===
Nebraska gubernatorial election, 1982
Party	Candidate	Votes	%
Democratic	Bob Kerrey	277,436	50.64%
Republican	Charles Thone (incumbent)	270,203	49.32%
Write-in	Others	263	0.05%
Total votes		547,902	100.0%
Democratic gain from Republican			

==== By County ====
By county

County	Person Democratic		Person Republican		Various candidates Other parties		Margin		Total votes
County	#	%	#	%	#	%	#	%	Total votes
Adams County									
Antelope County									
Arthur County									
Banner County									
Blaine County									
Boone County									
Box Butte County									
Boyd County									
Brown County									
Buffalo County									
Burt County									
Butler County									
Cass County									
Cedar County									
Chase County									
Cherry County									
Cheyenne County									
Clay County									
Colfax County									
Cuming County									
Custer County									
Dakota County									
Dawes County									
Dawson County									
Deuel County									
Dixon County									
Dodge County									
Douglas County									
Dundy County									
Fillmore County									
Franklin County									
Frontier County									
Furnas County									
Gage County									
Garden County									
Garfield County									
Gosper County									
Grant County									
Greeley County									
Hall County									
Hamilton County									
Hayes County									
Hitchcock County									
Holt County									
Hooker County									
Howard County									
Jefferson County									
Johnson County									
Kearney County									
Keith County									
Keya Paha County									
Kimball County									
Knox County									
Lancaster County									
Lincoln County									
Logan County									
Loup County									
Madison County									
McPherson County									
Merrick County									
Morrill County									
Nance County									
Nance County									
Nemaha County									
Nuckolls County									
Otoe County									
Pawnee County									
Perkins County									
Phelps County									
Pierce County									
Platte County									
Polk County									
Red Willow County									
Richardson County									
Rock County									
Saline County									
Sarpy County									
Saunders County									
Scotts Bluff County									
Seward County									
Sheridan County									
Sioux County									
Stanton County									
Thayer County									
Stanton County									
Thurston County									
Valley County									
Washington County									
Wayne County									
Webster County									
Wheeler County									
York County									
Totals									
