= Hal Bauer =

American politician (1927–1993)

Member of the Nebraska Legislature from the 28th district
- In office January 5, 1965 – January 3, 1967
- Preceded by: Frank Nelson
- Succeeded by: Roland Luedtke

Personal details
- Born: April 7, 1927 Lincoln, Nebraska
- Died: November 26, 1993 (aged 66) Lincoln, Nebraska
- Party: Democratic
- Spouse: Ethel Louise Sindelar (m. 1963, divorced)
- Children: 3 (Diann, Dawn, Debi)
- Education: University of Nebraska (B.S., LL.B.)
- Occupation: Attorney

Harold W. "Hal" Bauer (April 7, 1927 – November 26, 1993) was a Democratic politician from Nebraska who served as a member of the Nebraska Legislature from the 28th district from 1965 to 1967.

== Early life ==
Bauer was born in Lincoln, Nebraska, in 1927. He attended the University of Nebraska, receiving his bachelor's degree in business administration and his bachelor of laws degree. Bauer worked as an attorney in Lincoln.

In 1958, Bauer ran for one of two at-large trustee seats on the Lancaster County Sanitary District No. 1. He won the Democratic primary, and faced the two Republican nominees, incumbent trustee Neil C. Vandemoer and David Fenton. In the general election, Bauer and Fenton won. In 1962, the Sanitary District was abolished, and was replaced by the Salt-Wahoo Watershed District.

Bauer ran for Attorney General in 1960. He ran against former Thayer County Attorney W. O. Baldwin, Omaha attorney James Moylan, and Bridgeport attorney Paul Rhodes. Bauer received 25 percent of the vote and narrowly lost the primary to Baldwin, who received 27 percent of the vote and defeated Rhodes by 12 votes.

== Nebraska Legislature ==
In 1964, following redistricting, Bauer ran in the newly created 28th district, which was based in Lancaster County. Bauer ran in a crowded primary, and faced merchant A. A. Andros, attorney Herbert Friedman, businessman T. O. Haas, former Deputy Secretary of State Roland Luedtke, attorney Lawrence Murphy, and Burlington Railroad employee Lawrence Sintek. In the primary, Bauer placed second, receiving 29 percent of the vote to Luedtke's 40 percent, and they advanced to the general election. Though Luedtke was seen as the favorite, Bauer ultimately defeated him, winning 53-47 percent.

== Post-legislative career ==
In 1966, Bauer declined to seek re-election, and instead ran for a seat on the University of Nebraska Board of Regents from the 1st district, which included Cass, Johnson, Lancaster, Nemaha, Otoe, Pawnee, and Richardson counties in southeastern Nebraska. He challenged incumbent Regent Clarence Swanson for re-election, and was joined in the primary by Leo Bartunek, an attorney, and Edward Schwartzkopf, a Lincoln Public Schools education coordinator. Bauer placed third in the primary, receiving 23 percent of the vote to Swanson's 36 percent and Schwarzkopf's 30 percent.

After leaving the legislature, Bauer continued his legal practice, and was a partner in the law firm of Bauer, Galter, O'Brien, Allan and Butler.

== Death ==
Bauer died on November 26, 1993.
