= Jack Mills (Nebraska politician) =

American politician (1937–2019)

Member of the Nebraska Legislature from the 44th district
- In office January 8, 1975 – September 1, 1978
- Preceded by: Ramey Whitney
- Succeeded by: Shirley Parks

Personal details
- Born: August 22, 1937 Holdrege, Nebraska
- Died: February 14, 2019 (aged 81) Lincoln, Nebraska
- Party: Democratic
- Spouse: Norma Thorell Swanson (m. 1976)
- Children: 4 (Kevin, Melanie, Jody, Stephanie)
- Occupation: Farmer, lobbyist

Jaclund "Jack" Dale Mills (August 22, 1937 – February 14, 2019) was a Democratic politician from Nebraska who served as a member of the Nebraska Legislature from the 44th district from 1975 to 1978.

== Early life ==
Mills was born in Holdrege, Nebraska, in 1937, and grew up in Colorado and Nebraska, graduating from Superior High School. He settled in Big Springs, grew dryland wheat, sold grain and fertilizer, and worked for Dorn Elevator as a manager. Mills served on the Big Springs Board of Education from 1971 to 1974.

== Nebraska Legislature ==
In 1974, State Senator Ramey Whitney declined to seek re-election, and Mills ran to succeed him in the 44th district, which included Arthur, Chase, Deuel, Dundy, Garden, Hitchcock, Keith, and Perkins counties in western Nebraska. In the primary, he faced minister T. J. Fraser and Herbert Hughes, a wheat farmer. Mills placed first in the primary, winning 40 percent of the vote to Hughes's 34 percent and Fraser's 26 percent. Though the race was formally nonpartisan, Hughes was a Republican, and endorsed by Whitney as his successor, and Mills was a Democrat. Mills defeated Hughes by a wide margin, receiving 60 percent of the vote to Hughes's 40 percent.

Mills declined to seek a second term in 1978, citing "personal and business responsibilities."

== Post-legislative career ==
In August 1978, Mills was hired by the Nebraska Association of County Officials as its executive director, succeeding former State Senator Gerald Stromer. He resigned from the legislature on September 1, 1978. He served as executive director of the association until he retired on June 30, 2000. Mills also served on the board of directors of Blue Cross Blue Shield of Nebraska, including as chief executive officer and as chairman of the board, ultimately retiring in 2012.

== Death and legacy ==
Mills died on February 14, 2019. In 2025, when the Nebraska Association of County Officials opened the NACO West Training Center in Ogallala, it named the training center for Mills.
