= Donald McGinley =

American politician (1920–2005)

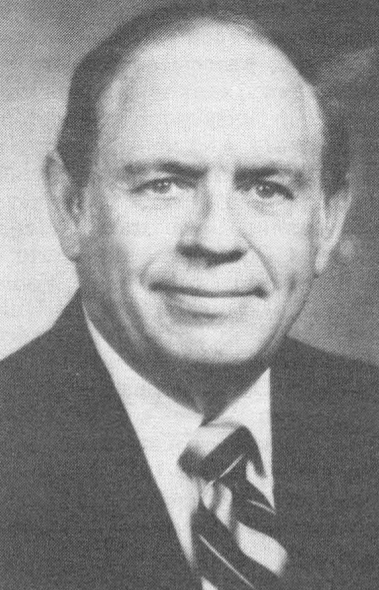

32nd Lieutenant Governor of Nebraska
- In office January 6, 1983 – January 9, 1987
- Governor: Bob Kerrey
- Preceded by: Roland Luedtke
- Succeeded by: William E. Nichol

Member of the U.S. House of Representatives from Nebraska's 4th district
- In office January 3, 1959 – January 3, 1961
- Preceded by: Arthur L. Miller
- Succeeded by: David Martin

Member of the Nebraska Legislature from the 39th district
- In office January 1, 1963 – January 5, 1965
- Preceded by: Lewis Webb
- Succeeded by: Albert Kjar (redistricted)
- In office January 4, 1955 – January 6, 1959
- Preceded by: Clyde Cretsinger
- Succeeded by: Lewis Webb

Personal details
- Born: June 30, 1920 Keith County, Nebraska
- Died: July 6, 2005 (aged 85) Lincoln, Nebraska
- Party: Democratic
- Education: University of Notre Dame; Georgetown University
- Profession: Attorney

Donald Francis McGinley (June 30, 1920 – July 6, 2005) was a Democratic politician from Nebraska who served a single term in the United States House of Representatives from 1959 to 1961 and as Nebraska's 32nd lieutenant governor from 1983 to 1987 under Governor Bob Kerrey.

McGinley was a highly educated attorney with degrees from the University of Notre Dame and Georgetown University. Before practicing law, he served in the United States Army Air Forces during World War II and was a reporter for the Denver Register.

He was admitted to the bar and began his practice in Ogallala in 1950. After returning to Nebraska, McGinley was elected to the state legislature in 1954 and to Congress four years later. He served a single term before losing to Republican David Martin.

He was a delegate to the 1964 Democratic National Convention and the 1968 Democratic National Convention. He became a judge in the Court of Industrial Relations in Lincoln, Nebraska from 1976 to 1980.

More than two decades later, McGinley made a political comeback as the running mate of Nebraska Gov. Bob Kerrey. He served as the state's lieutenant governor for four years and was later appointed by Gov. Ben Nelson to chair the Nebraska Selective Service Commission. He died in Lincoln on July 6, 2005. He was a member of the American Legion, Veterans of Foreign Wars, the Elks, the Knights of Columbus.

Party political offices
Preceded by Orval Keyes	Democratic nominee for Lieutenant Governor of Nebraska; 1982, 1986	Succeeded by Maxine Moul
U.S. House of Representatives
Preceded by Arthur L. Miller	United States Representative for the 4th congressional district of Nebraska; 1959–1961	Succeeded by David Martin
Political offices
Preceded by Roland Luedtke	Lieutenant Governor of Nebraska; 1983–1987	Succeeded by William E. Nichol
