= Bob Kerrey =

American politician and naval officer (born 1943)

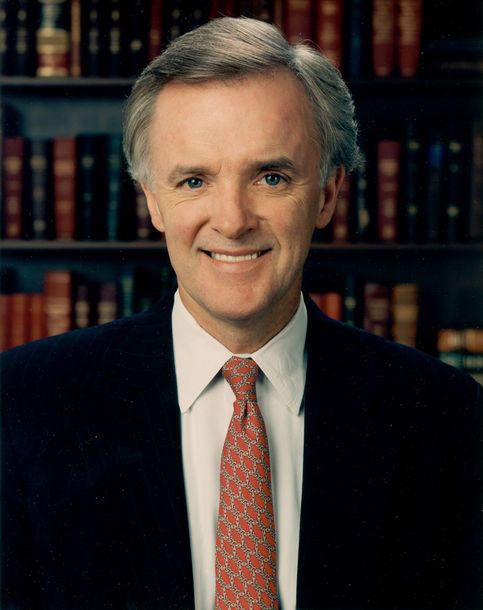
- Official portrait, c. 1999

7th President of The New School
- In office 2001–2010
- Preceded by: Jonathan Fanton
- Succeeded by: David E. Van Zandt

United States Senator from Nebraska
- In office January 3, 1989 – January 3, 2001
- Preceded by: David Karnes
- Succeeded by: Ben Nelson
Senate positions
Chair of the Democratic Senatorial Campaign Committee
In office January 3, 1995 – January 3, 1999
| Leader | Tom Daschle |
| Preceded by | Bob Graham |
| Succeeded by | Robert Torricelli |
Ranking Member of the Senate Intelligence Committee
In office January 3, 1995 – January 3, 1999
| Preceded by | John Warner |
| Succeeded by | Richard Bryan |

35th Governor of Nebraska
- In office January 6, 1983 – January 9, 1987
- Lieutenant: Donald McGinley
- Preceded by: Charles Thone
- Succeeded by: Kay Orr

Personal details
- Born: Joseph Robert Kerrey; August 27, 1943 (age 83) Lincoln, Nebraska, U.S.
- Party: Democratic (1978–present)
- Other political affiliations: Republican (before 1978)
- Spouses: Beverly Defnall (m. 1974; div. 1978); Sarah Paley (m. 2001)
- Children: 3
- Education: University of Nebraska (BS)

Military service
- Allegiance: United States
- Branch/service: United States Navy
- Years of service: 1966–1969
- Rank: Lieutenant (junior grade)
- Unit: SEAL Team 1
- Battles/wars: Vietnam War (WIA)
- Awards: Medal of Honor; Bronze Star Medal; Purple Heart
- Kerrey's voice Kerrey on the importance of regulating the tobacco industry and reducing youth smoking. Recorded May 21, 1998

Joseph Robert Kerrey (born August 27, 1943) is an American politician and businessman who served as the 35th governor of Nebraska from 1983 to 1987 and as a United States senator from Nebraska from 1989 to 2001.

Before entering politics, he served in the Vietnam War, as a United States Navy SEAL officer and was awarded the Medal of Honor for bravery in combat. During the action for which he was awarded the Medal of Honor, he was severely wounded, precluding further naval service. He later faced controversy for being the commanding officer during the Thanh Phong raid, where numerous civilians were killed.

Kerrey was a candidate for the Democratic presidential nomination in 1992. He retired from the Senate in 2000 and was replaced by former governor and fellow Democrat Ben Nelson. From 2001 to 2010, he served as president of The New School, a university in New York City. In May 2010, he was selected to become the head of the Motion Picture Association of America. The MPAA, however, could not reach an agreement with him and chose former Connecticut Senator Chris Dodd instead. In 2012, Kerrey sought election to his old Senate seat to succeed his successor, the retiring Democratic incumbent Ben Nelson. He lost to Republican nominee Deb Fischer.

In 2013, Kerrey joined the Carmen Group lobbying firm. Kerrey is a former co-chair of the advisory board of Issue One, an organization that describes its mission as "fighting for real solutions to the problem of money in politics". In 1987, Kerrey was elected to the Common Cause National Governing Board.

== Early life and education ==
Kerrey was born in Lincoln, Nebraska on August 27, 1943, the son of Elinor Fern (née Gonder), a University of Nebraska instructor, and James Henry Kerrey, a builder and businessman. He attended the public schools of Lincoln and graduated from Lincoln Northeast High School in 1961. He went on to earn a Bachelor of Science degree in pharmacy from the University of Nebraska in 1966. Kerrey pledged Phi Gamma Delta fraternity, and during his senior year he was admitted into the Society of Innocents, the chancellor's senior honorary society of spirit boosters.

== Military service ==
Kerrey served in the United States Navy as a SEAL officer during the Vietnam War. He completed Officer Candidate School in Newport, Rhode Island, in 1967. He then received assignment to Naval Amphibious Base Coronado and subsequently completed Basic Underwater Demolition/SEAL (BUD/S) training with class 42 in December 1967. He received direct assignment to SEAL Team ONE, a separate organization from the Underwater Demolition Teams to which new personnel were normally assigned. After extensive pre-deployment training, Kerrey deployed to the Republic of Vietnam as assistant platoon commander with Delta Platoon, SEAL Team ONE in January 1969.

Kerrey was seriously wounded and lost the lower part of his right leg in combat on Hon Tre island near Nha Trang Bay on March 14, 1969. While suffering shrapnel wounds and blood loss, Kerrey organized his squad in a counterattack that killed or captured enemy Viet Cong. He was later medically discharged from the US Navy due to his wounds. On May 14, 1970, President Richard Nixon awarded Kerrey the Medal of Honor for his heroic actions.

=== Medal of Honor citation ===
His Medal of Honor citation reads:

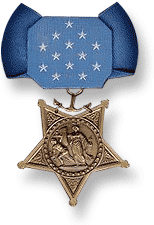
The U.S. Navy's variant of the Medal of Honor.

For conspicuous gallantry and intrepidity at the risk of his life above and beyond the call of duty on 14 March 1969 while serving as a SEAL Team Leader during action against enemy aggressor (Viet Cong) forces in the Republic of Vietnam. Acting in response to reliable intelligence, Lieutenant (jg) Kerrey led his SEAL Team on a mission to capture important members of the enemy's area political cadre known to be located on an island in the bay of Nha Trang. In order to surprise the enemy, he and his team scaled a 350-foot sheer cliff to place themselves above the ledge on which the enemy was located. Splitting his team in two elements and coordinating both, Lieutenant (jg) Kerrey led his men in the treacherous downward descent to the enemy's camp. Just as they neared the end of their descent, intense enemy fire was directed at them, and Lieutenant (jg) Kerrey received massive injuries from a grenade which exploded at his feet and threw him backward onto the jagged rocks. Although bleeding profusely and suffering great pain, he displayed outstanding courage and presence of mind in immediately directing his element's fire into the heart of the enemy camp. Utilizing his radioman, Lieutenant (jg) Kerrey called in the second element's fire support which caught the confused Viet Cong in a devastating cross fire. After successfully suppressing the enemy's fire, and although immobilized by his multiple wounds, he continued to maintain calm, superlative control as he ordered his team to secure and defend an extraction site. Lieutenant (jg) Kerrey resolutely directed his men, despite his near-unconscious state, until he was eventually evacuated by helicopter. The havoc brought to the enemy by this very successful mission cannot be overestimated. The enemy who were captured provided critical intelligence to the allied effort. Lieutenant (jg) Kerrey's courageous and inspiring leadership, valiant fighting spirit, and tenacious devotion to duty in the face of almost overwhelming opposition, sustain and enhance the finest traditions of the United States Naval Service.

=== Thanh Phong raid ===
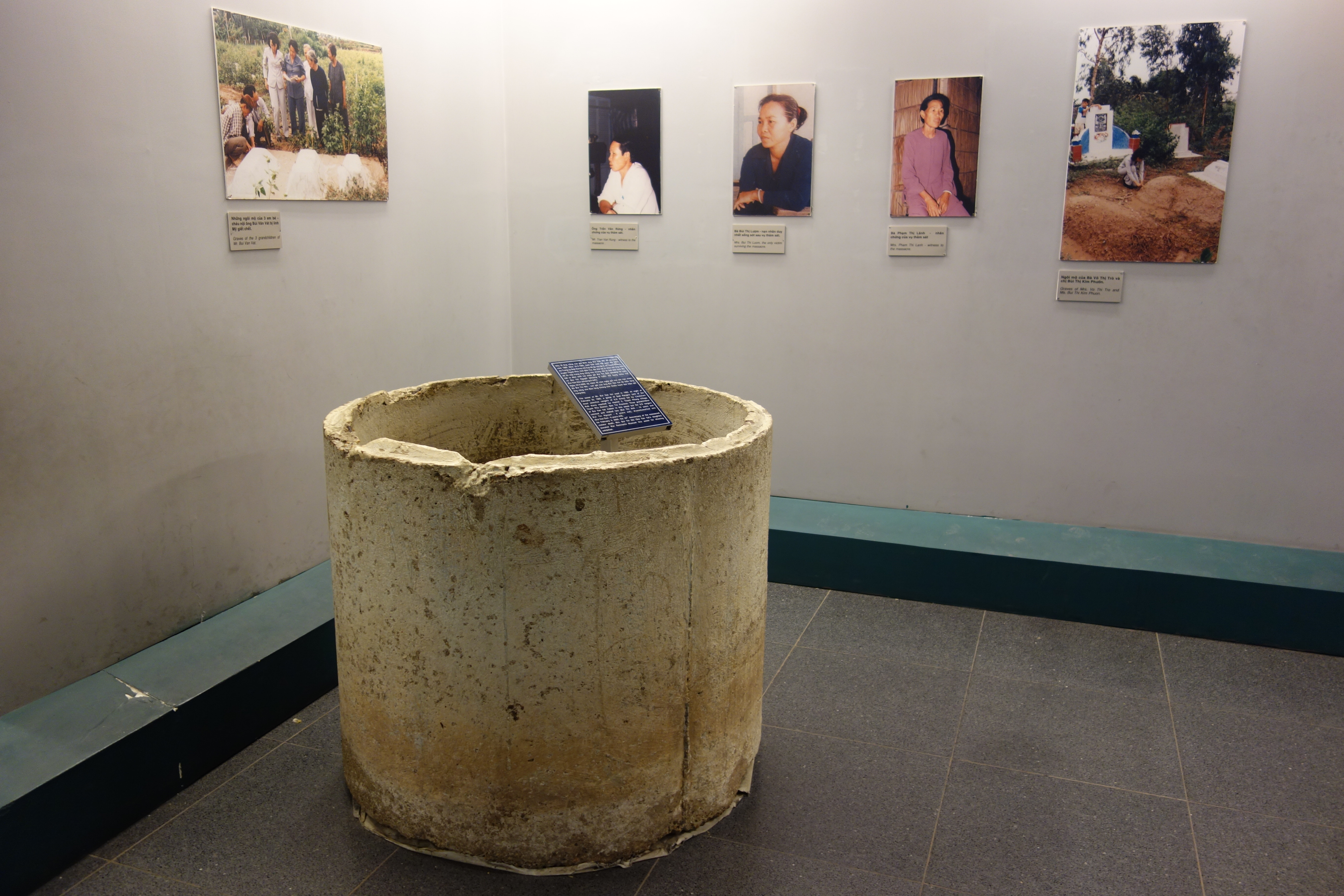
The Thanh Phong sewer pipe in which three children hid before being killed is on display at the War Remnants Museum in Ho Chi Minh City

In 2001, The New York Times Magazine and 60 Minutes II carried reports on an incident that occurred during Kerrey's Vietnam War service. On February 25, 1969, he and his squad, known as Kerrey's Raiders, led a Swift Boat raid on the isolated peasant village of Thanh Phong, Vietnam, targeting a Viet Cong leader who intelligence suggested would be present. The village was considered part of a free-fire zone by the U.S. military.

Kerrey's SEAL team first encountered a villager's hut. Later, according to Kerrey, the team was "shot at" from the village and returned fire, only to find after the battle that some of the killed appeared to be children. "The thing that I will remember until the day I die, is walking in and finding, I don't know, 14 or so, I don't even know what the number was, women and children who were dead", Kerrey said in 1998. "I was expecting to find Viet Cong soldiers with weapons, dead. Instead I found women and children." Kerrey denied personally participating in the operation, but admitted to his own complicity.

Gerhard Klann, a member of Kerrey's SEAL team, gave a different version. According to Klann, the team rounded up civilians and decided to "kill them and get out of there", for fear that they would alert enemy soldiers. He said that Kerrey gave the order. Kerrey responded to Klann's account by stating "it's not my memory of it". Another witness, Pham Tri Lanh, said she hid in a banana grove as the soldiers entered the village. She says she witnessed the soldiers kill five civilians. Another survivor, Bui Thi Luom, was twelve at the time of the attack. She says seven men entered their hut of sixteen civilians, including five of her relatives, and killed the occupants with gunfire and an explosive device. She was the only survivor.

Kerrey expressed anguish and guilt over the events of that night, saying: "You can never, can never get away from it. It darkens your day. I thought dying for your country was the worst thing that could happen to you, and I don't think it is. I think killing for your country can be a lot worse. Because that's the memory that haunts."

In a speech to ROTC candidates at Virginia Military Institute in 2001, Kerrey acknowledged using "lethal procedures when there was doubt." And admitted "It was a tragedy, and I had ordered it," he said. "Though it could be justified militarily, I could never make my own peace with what happened that night. I have been haunted by it for 32 years."

He was awarded a Bronze Star for the raid on Thanh Phong, after his unit had falsely reported all the dead civilians as enemy guerrillas. The citation for the medal reads, "The net result of his patrol was 21 Viet Cong killed, two hooches [huts] destroyed and two enemy weapons captured."

A display at the War Remnants Museum in Ho Chi Minh City is based on the incident. It includes several photos and a drain pipe, which it describes as the place where three children hid before they were found and killed.

== Business career ==
After his military service, Kerrey pursued a business career. From 1972 to 1982, he owned and operated Grandmother's Inc. a chain of restaurants known as Grandmother's Skillet. Another company, Kerrey Holdings, included several fitness centers and a bowling alley. After he ceded active management to his brother-in-law in 1983, the businesses grew to include 10 restaurants, three fitness centers, a bowling alley, and other enterprises. Kerrey's other ventures included trading in cattle futures and a partnership that invested in commercial real estate including shopping centers.

While engaged in his business career, Kerrey gained his initial political experience. These activities included working on a 1971 voter registration drive with anti-war activist Allard K. Lowenstein. Kerrey also managed a friend's successful campaign for a seat in the state legislature. In addition, he served as a member of the city of Lincoln's Human Rights Commission.

== Governor of Nebraska (1983–1987) ==
In 1982, Kerrey ran for Governor of Nebraska; he easily won the Democratic nomination 71% to 29% over state senator George "Bill" Burrows, then achieved a narrow victory over incumbent Republican Charles Thone, 51% to 49%. He served as one term, 1983 to 1987, and did not run for reelection. During his governorship, Kerrey pursued policies including welfare reform, education reform, job training, and environmental conservation. Several of these programs became models for other states and the federal government.

In 1986, Kerrey served as chair of the Midwestern Governors Association. As governor, he was known for his transparency and criticism of "politics as usual" obfuscating and clichés. He was the subject of nationwide news coverage in July 1986, when he ordered the Nebraska State Patrol to halt a train after the federal government failed to notify him of a rail shipment of nuclear waste that would pass through Nebraska, and directed the Nebraska Army National Guard to park a tank on the tracks at the Kansas-Nebraska border to ensure that the train did not proceed. After Kerrey's chief of staff and the head of the state patrol met with federal authorities in Kansas, the train was allowed to proceed, with representatives of the federal government agreeing to notify state officials of the dates, times and routes for similar trains in the future.

== United States Senator (1989–2001) ==
=== Elections ===
==== 1988 ====
In 1988, Kerrey ran for the U.S. Senate seat held by recently appointed incumbent Republican David Karnes. He won the Democratic primary with 92% of the vote. In the general election, he defeated Karnes 57% to 42%.

==== 1994 ====
Kerrey won re-election to a second term defeating businesswoman Jan Stoney 55% to 45%

==== 2012 ====
Kerrey ran again for his old Senate seat after the retirement of incumbent Democratic Senator Ben Nelson in 2012, but was defeated by Republican candidate State Senator Deb Fischer.

=== Tenure ===
Senator Kerrey was a member of the Agriculture Committee and the Finance Committee, and was a member of the Appropriations Committee from 1989 to 1996. He also served as vice chairman of the Intelligence Committee from 1995 to 1999. He was the chairman of the Democratic Senatorial Campaign Committee for the 104th Congress before retiring in 2001.

Kerrey voted for the Gramm–Leach–Bliley Act which repealed the Glass–Steagall Act in 1999, defending his position against opposition by stating, "The concerns that we will have a meltdown like 1929 are dramatically overblown". Most famously, Kerrey cast the deciding vote in favor of President Bill Clinton's 1993 budget plan.

== 1992 presidential election ==
1992 presidential campaign logo

In September 1991, Kerrey announced his candidacy for the 1992 Democratic nomination for president. In a small field of five second-tier candidates devoid of an early frontrunner, Kerrey was seen as the early favorite. However, his performance on the campaign trail sometimes seemed lackluster, especially in comparison to that of Arkansas governor Bill Clinton.

Kerrey finished third in the New Hampshire primary in February 1992, despite spending heavily on television advertising. He briefly rebounded after winning the South Dakota primary but soon dropped out of the race after finishing fourth in the Colorado primary. Kerrey was on Clinton's "short list" of vice presidential candidates, but Tennessee Senator Al Gore received the nod instead.

== 9/11 Commission ==
After his retirement from the Senate, Kerrey served on the National Commission on Terrorist Attacks Upon the United States, commonly known as the 9/11 Commission. The commission was created by Congressional legislation to investigate the circumstances of the attacks on September 11, 2001, and to provide recommendations of actions that could help prevent future similar attacks. It was a bipartisan commission of five Democrats and five Republicans. The commission issued its final report, the 9/11 Commission Report on July 22, 2004.

Kerrey criticized the 2014 Senate Intelligence Committee report on CIA torture as "unfair" and "partisan".

== The New School ==
Kerrey served as President of The New School from 2001 to 2010. During this time he more than doubled the endowment, taking it from $94 million in 2001 to $206 million. He also secured substantial federal funding for the school. Both of these factors helped the New School accomplish major academic growth and expansion in the decade that Kerrey was president.

Kerrey presided over an ambitious program of academic development at the university. Under his leadership, the university launched numerous new academic programs, including several joint degree programs. Enrollment increased by 44% to over 10,200, and online course enrollment doubled. He also oversaw an increase in the size of the faculty. The number of full-time faculty members grew from 156 in 2001 to more than 372 in 2009. He also helped to establish the Faculty Senate, which allowed the school to set university-wide standards for promotion, hiring, and faculty evaluation. Additionally, tenure was instituted for all academic departments.

On April 14, 2005, Kerrey announced that the university was changing its name from "New School University" to "The New School", and rebranding its eight divisions as specialized, separate entities serving different constituencies.

On April 17, 2005, a week after accepting a position as head of Democrats for Bloomberg in support of Michael Bloomberg's re-election as Mayor of New York City, Kerrey publicly stated that he was considering running against Bloomberg in the 2005 New York City mayoral election. Three days after announcing his interest, Kerrey announced that he would not run for Mayor, focusing instead on his position as President of the New School.

On December 10, 2008, it was announced that Kerrey had received a vote of no confidence from the university's senior faculty. This was perceived to have come as a response to his management style. The no-confidence vote was largely a symbolic gesture. The Board of Trustees offered their unanimous support for Kerrey at a meeting following the faculty vote.

On December 16, 2008, dozens of students took over the cafeteria in the 65 5th Avenue building; as the occupation continued, the group grew into hundreds of students from the New School, other New York City based universities, labor union members, and other supporters. Initially, the students stated that they would not leave the building unless several school officials resigned. Kerrey attempted to have a discussion with the students at the beginning of the occupation, but the students voted down that option. The occupation ended after 30 hours when the two parties accepted a treaty; Kerrey agreed to amnesty for the students involved in the occupation, more student space, and more student input in school investments and decision making.

Early in the morning of April 10, 2009, 19 students took over the 65 5th Avenue building, erecting an anarchist flag and demanding once again that Kerrey resign. A few hours later, about 20 police officers entered the building, arresting 22 students and ending the occupation after five hours.

In December 2012, the Chronicle of Higher Education reported that in 2010, the year of his anticipated departure, his salary was more than $600,000, and his total take-home pay, including bonuses, deferred compensation and nontaxable benefits, was $3,047,703, making Kerrey the highest-paid private college president in the United States.

Kerrey's time as president concluded on January 1, 2011. He was succeeded by David E. Van Zandt. Kerrey was then appointed President Emeritus.

== Fulbright University Vietnam controversy ==
While visiting Vietnam in May 2016, then Secretary of State John Kerry announced that the United States had appointed Kerrey to be chairman of the Board of Trustees of Fulbright University Vietnam. This announcement unleashed a heated controversy, in view of Kerrey's role as the person in charge of the Thanh Phong village massacre in 1969.

Outspoken Vietnamese critics of the appointment of Kerrey included Tôn Nữ Thị Ninh, a former ambassador to the European Union, who exclaimed: "the decision to appoint Bob Kerrey to be chairman of the board of the first American-style university in Vietnam strikes me as insensitive to the Vietnamese at best, and taking us for granted at worst." and the award-winning Vietnamese-American author Viet Thanh Nguyen. On the other hand, Kerrey's appointment was endorsed by Đinh La Thăng, who at that time was Communist Party Secretary of Ho Chi Minh City and a member of the Politburo, but in January 2018 was tried, convicted, and sentenced to 13 years in prison on corruption charges.

A critic Bao Anh Thai, a lawyer in Ho Chi Minh City, said that leading a university was not the proper place for a man with Kerrey's war record. "Please tell me the name of any prestigious university in this world, where a killer in cold blood of women and children — which he admitted to it and he is not charged for it — could be the president!," also pointing out Kerrey's previous tenure as President of The New School.

Nguyen Duc Hien, another critic and journalist at a legal newspaper, noted that Kerrey kept quiet about the atrocities in Thanh Phong for more than 30 years and only spoke publicly about it when journalists had exposed him and forced his hand. "After killing and lying, he should not represent knowledge and contributing the values of America in Vietnam!"

In May 2018, H. Kim Bottomly, former president of Wellesley College, was appointed to succeed Kerrey.

== Failed comeback bid ==
On December 27, 2011, Political Wire reported that Ben Nelson, who had succeeded Kerrey in the Senate, would not seek re-election, and asserted that Kerrey was in talks with senior Democrats about the possibility of replacing him. The Washington Post reported that Kerrey would neither confirm nor deny the rumor. American Crossroads had been running advertisements critical of Kerrey's potential Nebraska Senate run, focusing on the fact that Kerrey had been living in New York for the last ten years. Kerrey responded to the ads with an invitation for Karl Rove to eat at one of Kerrey's restaurants in Nebraska, or to work out at one of his gyms that he owns in that state. On February 27, 2012, The Washington Post reported that Kerrey had earlier decided against a run, but that an aide had confirmed that he was now filing to seek election to his old Senate seat. He won the May 15 Democratic primary against four minor candidates. However, he was defeated on November 6 by Republican state senator Deb Fischer in a landslide. Kerrey narrowly won the state's two largest counties, Douglas and Lancaster—home to Omaha and Lincoln, respectively—but only won three other counties. His margin in Omaha and Lincoln was not nearly enough to overcome Fischer's margin in the more rural parts of the state.

== Relationship with Jeffrey Epstein ==
In January 2026, it was revealed that Kerrey met with Jeffrey Epstein twice in 2013 and communicated with him several times via email. From 2013 to 2014, the emails show scheduling social meetings such as lunches, dinners, and breakfasts, as well as book recommendations and potential investments. Following the revelation, Kerrey resigned from his position as Chairman of Monolith Inc., a clean energy start up on February 25, 2026.

== Personal life ==
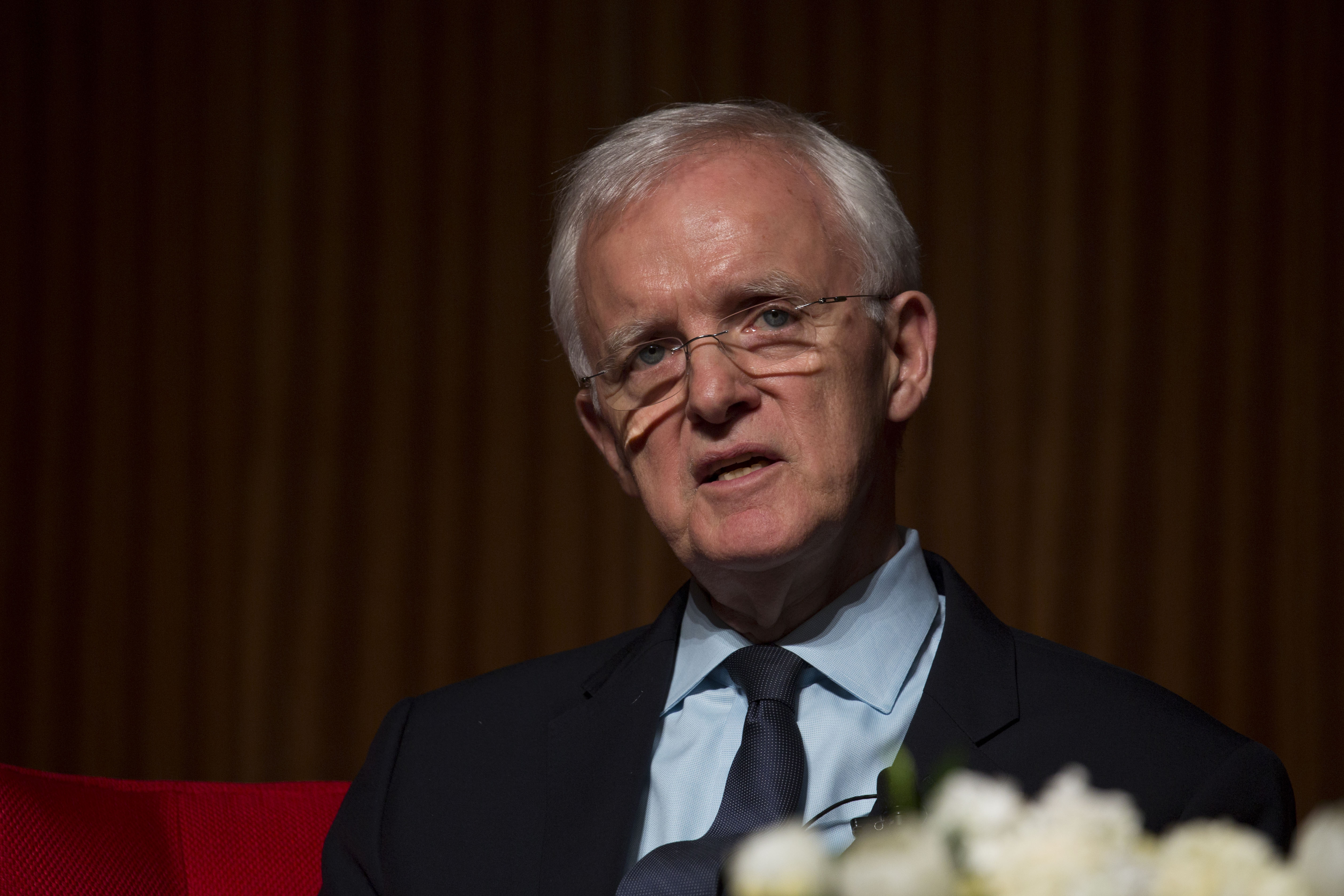
Kerrey at the LBJ Library in 2016

While he was Governor of Nebraska, Kerrey dated actress Debra Winger while the latter was in Lincoln filming Terms of Endearment (part of which is set in Nebraska), which won the 1983 Oscar for Best Picture. When confronted with intense questioning by the press over the nature of the relationship, Kerrey famously replied; "What can I say – she swept me off my foot", alluding to the fact that the lower part of one of his legs was amputated because of injuries sustained in his Medal of Honor action in Vietnam.

Kerrey is friends with fellow Vietnam veteran Jim Webb. In 2006 he became involved in convincing Webb to run for the US Senate. Webb entered the Virginia Democratic Primary, and Kerrey volunteered to serve as Webb's National Finance Chair. Webb went on to win the extremely close election in Virginia, defeating George Allen. Kerrey also endorsed and appeared at campaign events for Al Franken in his bid for the U.S. Senate in Minnesota.

Kerrey married Sarah Paley in 2001. They have a son. He has two children from his previous marriage.

In a 2012 New York Times column by Frank Bruni, Kerrey was introduced as a self-described agnostic; he said that during his political career, he refrained from using religious references such as "God bless America" in speeches because of his support for the separation of church and state, but remarked that in American politics, "If you talk openly about your doubts, you can get into trouble". In a 1989 congressional directory, he listed himself as member of a Presbyterian church.

On September 9, 2008, a pedestrian bridge connecting Omaha, Nebraska with Council Bluffs, Iowa was named in Kerrey's honor by the Omaha City Council.

In 2011, Kerrey was awarded an Honorary Doctorate from The New School.

In 2016, Kerrey received an honorary doctorate and delivered the postgraduate commencement address for Southern New Hampshire University.

== Awards and decorations ==
=== Medals and ribbons ===
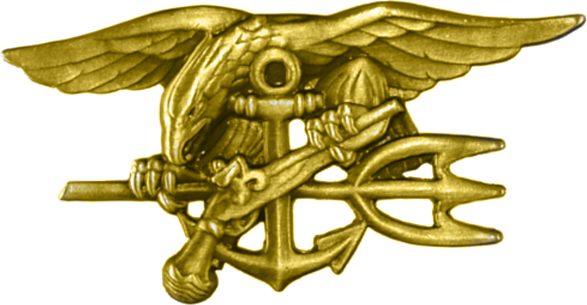

Special Warfare insignia
Medal of Honor
| Bronze Star Medal | Purple Heart Medal | Combat Action Ribbon |
| National Defense Service Medal | Vietnam Service Medal | Vietnam Campaign Medal |
Naval Parachutist Insignia

== Legacy ==
The US Navy has authorized a ship named in his honor;

- USS Robert Kerrey (DDG-146), an Arleigh Burke-class guided missile destroyer.

== See also ==
- List of Medal of Honor recipients for the Vietnam War
- Bob Kerrey Pedestrian Bridge
- List of United States Navy SEALs

== Notes ==
Party political offices
| Preceded by Gerald Whelan | Democratic nominee for Governor of Nebraska; 1982 | Succeeded by Helen Boosalis |
| Preceded by Edward Zorinsky | Democratic nominee for U.S. Senator from Nebraska (Class 1); 1988, 1994 | Succeeded by Ben Nelson |
| Preceded by Bob Graham | Chair of the Democratic Senatorial Campaign Committee; 1995–1999 | Succeeded by Robert Torricelli |
| Preceded by Ben Nelson | Democratic nominee for U.S. Senator from Nebraska (Class 1); 2012 | Succeeded by Jane Raybould |
Political offices
| Preceded by Charles Thone | Governor of Nebraska; 1983–1987 | Succeeded by Kay Orr |
U.S. Senate
| Preceded by David Karnes | United States Senator (Class 1) from Nebraska; 1989–2001; Served alongside: James Exon, Chuck Hagel | Succeeded by Ben Nelson |
U.S. order of precedence (ceremonial)
| Preceded by Richard Bryan as Former U.S. Senator | Order of precedence of the United States as Former U.S. Senator | Succeeded by Ben Nelson as Former U.S. Senator |
