= Charles Thone =

American politician (1924–2018)

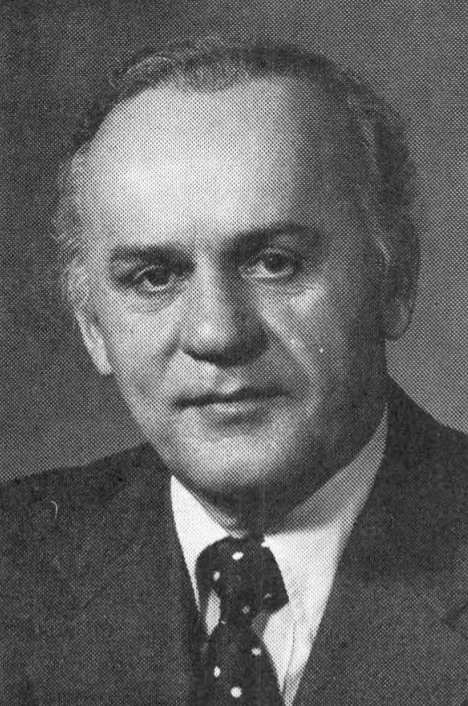

34th Governor of Nebraska
- In office January 4, 1979 – January 6, 1983
- Lieutenant: Roland Luedtke
- Preceded by: James Exon
- Succeeded by: Bob Kerrey

Member of the U.S. House of Representatives from Nebraska's 1st district
- In office January 3, 1971 – January 3, 1979
- Preceded by: Robert V. Denney
- Succeeded by: Doug Bereuter

Personal details
- Born: January 4, 1924 Hartington, Nebraska
- Died: March 7, 2018 (aged 94) Lincoln, Nebraska, U.S.
- Party: Republican
- Spouse: Ruth Raymond
- Education: University of Nebraska (JD)

Charles Thone (January 4, 1924 – March 7, 2018) was an American Republican politician. He was the 34th governor of Nebraska, serving from 1979 to 1983. He previously served as a member of the United States House of Representatives, representing Nebraska's 1st congressional district, from 1971 to 1979.

== Early life ==
Thone was born in Hartington, Nebraska. He was one of four sons, including John Jr. He graduated from Hartington High School. During World War II, he served in the Infantry and in the field artillery and the Army Air Corps of the United States Army as a non-commissioned officer and as an officer.

== Political career ==
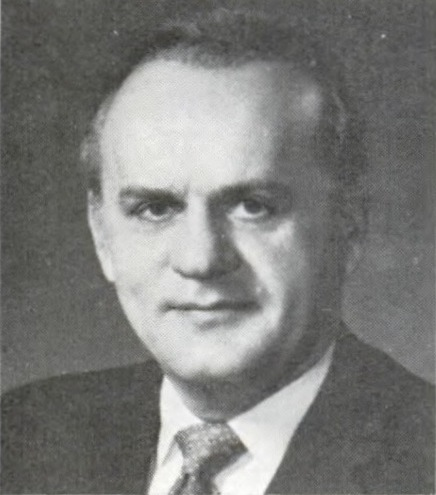
Thone as a congressman.

While attending the University of Nebraska–Lincoln, Thone served as the pledge president of the Phi Gamma Delta fraternity. During that time, one of the pledges was a young Johnny Carson whom Thone agreed to sponsor because he felt that Carson's humor would be an asset to the fraternity.

Following graduation from the University of Nebraska College of Law in 1950, he set up private practice in Lincoln, Nebraska. He served as deputy secretary of state of Nebraska from 1951 to 1952. In 1952, he became President of the Nebraska Junior Chamber of Commerce. He married Ruth Raymond on August 16, 1953. From 1954 to 1970, he served as Administrative Assistant to U.S. Senator Roman Hruska.

Thone was elected to the United States House of Representatives in 1970, representing Nebraska's 1st congressional district from 1971 to 1979. During his tenure in Congress, he served as assistant minority whip, and as a member of the House Select Committee on Assassinations.

=== Governorship ===
In the 1978 election, he was elected the 34th Governor of Nebraska, a post he held until he was narrowly defeated for reelection in the 1982 election by Bob Kerrey, leaving office in January 1983. He chaired the Old West Economic Development Commission from 1981 to 1982, and the Agricultural Committee of the President's Export Council from 1982 to 1985.

=== Later career ===
In the 1992 presidential election, he cast one of the state's five electoral votes for President George H. W. Bush. In 2008, he did the same for John McCain.

After retiring from public life, he practiced law in the Lincoln, Nebraska office of Erickson and Sederstrom.

Thone died on March 7, 2018, at age 94.

U.S. House of Representatives
Preceded by Robert V. Denney	Member of the U.S. House of Representatives from Nebraska's 1st congressional district 1971–1979	Succeeded by Doug Bereuter
Party political offices
Preceded by Dwight Burney	Republican nominee for Lieutenant Governor of Nebraska; 1964	Succeeded by John Everroad
Preceded by Richard Marvel	Republican nominee for Governor of Nebraska; 1978, 1982	Succeeded by Kay A. Orr
Political offices
Preceded by James Exon	Governor of Nebraska; 1979–1983	Succeeded by Bob Kerrey
