= J. James Exon =

American politician (1921–2005)

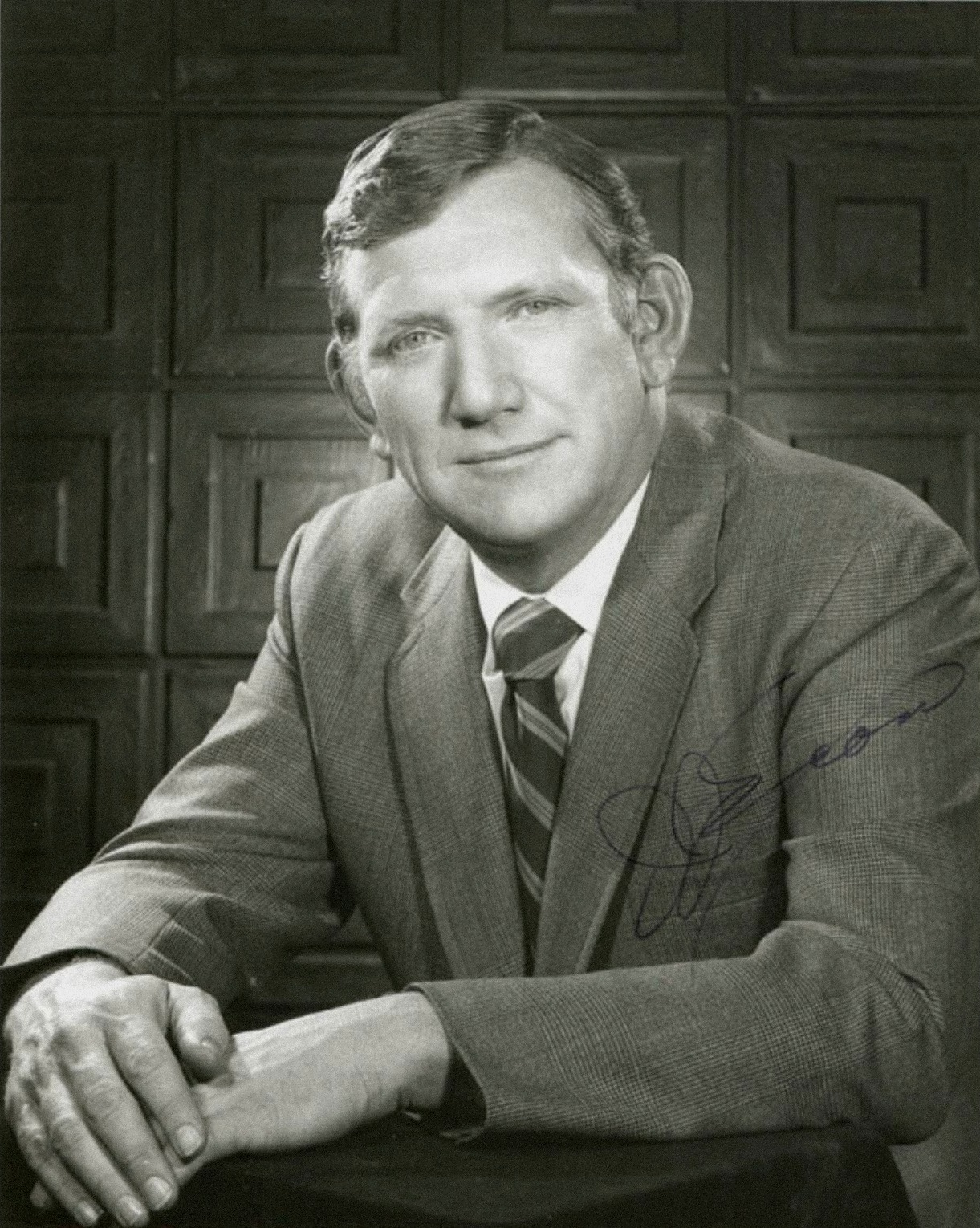
- Exon in 1979

United States Senator from Nebraska
- In office January 3, 1979 – January 3, 1997
- Preceded by: Carl Curtis
- Succeeded by: Chuck Hagel

33rd Governor of Nebraska
- In office January 7, 1971 – January 4, 1979
- Lieutenant: Frank Marsh; Gerald Whelan
- Preceded by: Norbert Tiemann
- Succeeded by: Charles Thone

Personal details
- Born: John James Exon; August 9, 1921 Geddes, South Dakota, U.S.
- Died: June 10, 2005 (aged 83) Lincoln, Nebraska, U.S.
- Resting place: Wyuka Cemetery
- Party: Democratic
- Spouse: Patricia Exon
- Education: University of Nebraska Omaha

Military service
- Branch/service: United States Army
- Unit: Signal Corps
- Battles/wars: World War II
- Exon's voice Exon discusses his concerns with FY1992 defense appropriations Recorded November 23, 1991

John James Exon (August 9, 1921 – June 10, 2005) was an American businessman and politician who served as the 33rd governor of Nebraska from 1971 to 1979, and as a United States senator from Nebraska from 1979 to 1997. A member of the Democratic Party, Exon never lost an election, and was the only Democrat ever to hold Nebraska's Class 2 U.S. Senate seat. He was elected governor in 1970, re-elected in 1974, elected to the Senate in 1978, and re-elected to that seat in 1984 and 1990.

== Early career ==
Exon was born in Geddes, South Dakota, on August 9, 1921, and grew up in Lake Andes, South Dakota. His grandfather, an immigrant from England, founded the Democratic Party of South Dakota. He moved to Nebraska in 1939 to attend the University of Omaha (now University of Nebraska Omaha) between 1939 and 1941. Exon joined the United States Army Signal Corps in 1942, and served two years overseas in New Guinea, the Philippines and Japan during World War II. He was honorably discharged as a master sergeant in December 1945 and served in the Army Reserve until 1949.

After the war, he returned to Nebraska and worked as the branch manager of a financial services institution in Fremont. He founded Exon Office Supplies (later Exon's Inc.) in Lincoln in 1953 and served as its president until 1971. In 1972, when Esso (Standard Oil Company of New Jersey) changed its name to Exxon, the secretary of state of Nebraska, Allen J. Beermann, declined to register the name due to the existence of Exon's Inc. Exon later claimed that he received an unspecified settlement from Exxon in exchange for renaming his business the J.J. Exon Company.

He started his political career as a precinct worker for the Democrats. In 1964, he was a delegate to the Democratic National Convention for Nebraska and served as a delegate for that state in every convention between 1972 and 2004. He served as a member of the Nebraska Democratic State Central Committee between 1964 and 1968 and was a member of the Democratic National Committee from 1968 to 1970. Exon was Chair of the Nebraska Democratic Party in 1970 when he decided to run for governor.

== Governor of Nebraska (1971–1979) ==
Exon's first bid for public office was his successful campaign for Governor of Nebraska in 1970, defeating incumbent Republican Norbert Tiemann. The term of the governor had been extended to four years beginning with Tiemann's win in 1966. Exon was re-elected in a landslide in 1974, becoming the first person to serve eight years as Nebraska governor.

His repeated vetoes of the legislature's spending programs earned Exon the reputation as a fiscal conservative. He vetoed 141 bills in his final seven years as governor or an average of 20 a year.

Exon opposed gay rights. As a candidate for governor, he voiced his opposition to a 'homophile studies' class at the University of Nebraska–Lincoln, taught by Louis Crompton. As governor, Exon vetoed the legalization of gay sex in 1977, expressing opposition to "perverts, homos, and gays." The legislature overrode his veto, and Nebraska became among the first states to legalize same-sex intercourse.

== United States Senator (1979–1997) ==
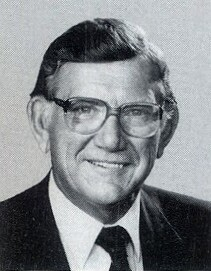
1995, Congressional Pictorial Directory

Exon's popularity as governor carried over to his 1978 campaign for the U.S. Senate, and he was elected with 68 percent of the vote. He had a reputation as a moderate Democrat, often working with Republicans on fiscal and military issues. While serving on the Senate Armed Services Committee, Exon was a strong defender of the B-2 stealth bomber.

On October 19, 1983, Exon was one of four Democratic senators to vote against a bill establishing Martin Luther King, Jr. Day. The legislation was signed into law by President Ronald Reagan the following month.

In 1984, Exon had the closest election in his political career, eventually winning re-election by 25,000 votes. He was re-elected to his third term in 1990.

He helped sponsor the Exon-Florio Amendment, which prevented takeovers or mergers by foreign companies of U.S. companies, if said merger was found to be a threat to national security.

In 1988, Exon took 10 vacations paid for by lobbying groups.

In October 1991, he was one of eleven Democrats who voted to confirm Clarence Thomas to the U.S. Supreme Court in a 52-48 vote.

Exon helped to write and secure support for a spending reduction in the U.S. budget of $14 billion in 1994, which he stated was his proudest political achievement. His Communications Decency Act of 1996 was Congress' first effort to try to regulate content on the Internet with the goal of preventing access or transmission of pornography on the internet. It was later overturned by a unanimous U.S. Supreme Court as an unconstitutional infringement of the First Amendment.

== Final years and death ==
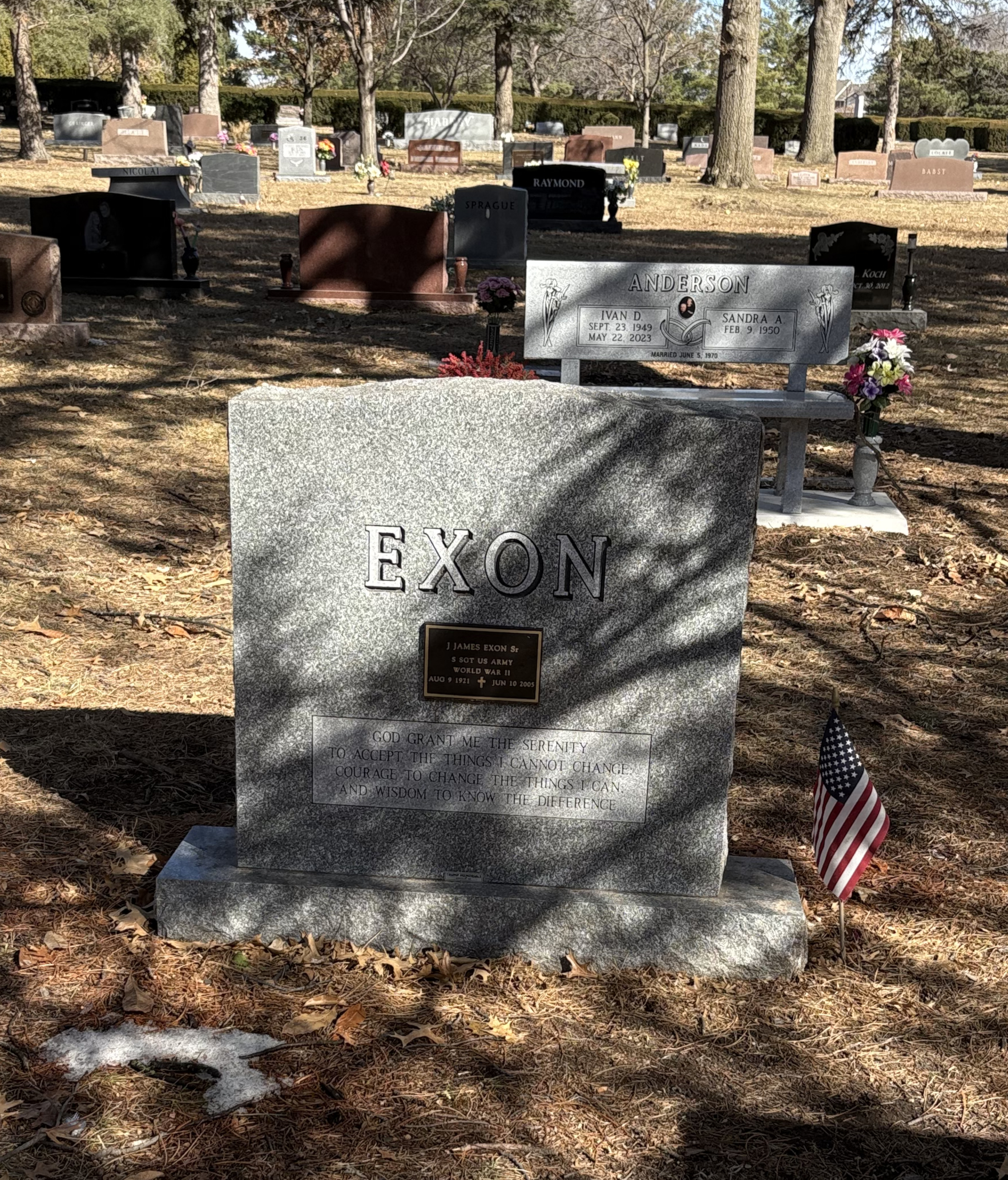
Exon's grave at Wyuka Cemetery

After his retirement, Exon served on a Committee established by Congress and led by John M. Deutch on the threat of weapons of mass destruction. In the report, Exon warned of the dangers if such weapons fell into the hands of terrorists and recommended the formation of an agency with a similar role to the Department of Homeland Security.

He was treated for cancer in the last years of his life, although he claimed in 2003 that it wasn't "highly malignant". Exon died of natural causes at Madonna Rehabilitation Hospital in Lincoln, Nebraska on June 10, 2005. He was the first person to lie in state for public viewing in the rotunda of the State Capitol building.

He was buried at Wyuka Cemetery in Lincoln.

Party political offices
Preceded by Philip Sorensen	Democratic nominee for Governor of Nebraska; 1970, 1974	Succeeded by Gerald Whelan
Preceded by Terry Carpenter	Democratic nominee for U.S. Senator (Class 2) from Nebraska; 1978, 1984, 1990	Succeeded by Ben Nelson
Political offices
Preceded by Norbert Tiemann	Governor of Nebraska; January 7, 1971 – January 3, 1979	Succeeded by Charles Thone
U.S. Senate
Preceded by Carl Curtis	U.S. senator (Class 2) from Nebraska; January 3, 1979 – January 3, 1997; Served alongside: Edward Zorinsky, David Karnes, Bob Kerrey	Succeeded by Chuck Hagel
Preceded by Pete Domenici	Ranking Member of the Senate Budget Committee; 1995–1997	Succeeded by Frank Lautenberg
