= 1984 United States Senate election in Nebraska =

- November 6, 1984
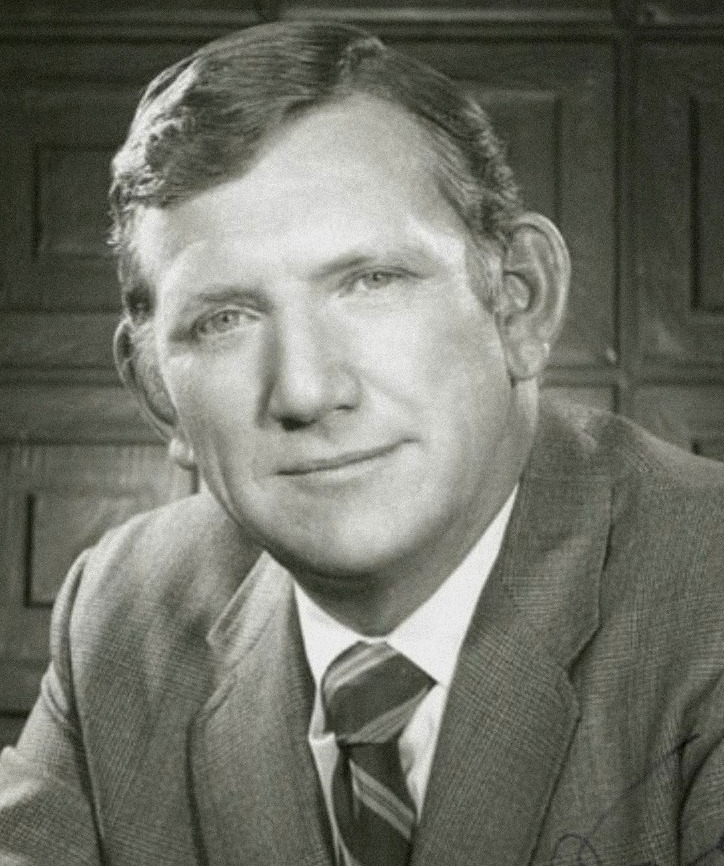

Nominee	J. James Exon	Nancy Hoch
Party	Democratic	Republican
Popular vote	332,217	307,147
Percentage	51.94%	48.02%
- County results Exon: 50–60% 60–70% Hoch: 50–60% 60–70% 70–80%
U.S. senator before election
J. James Exon
Democratic
Elected U.S. Senator
J. James Exon
Democratic

The 1984 United States Senate election in Nebraska was held on November 6, 1984. Incumbent Democratic Senator J. James Exon ran for re-election to a second term. He was challenged by Nancy Hoch, the Republican nominee and a member of the University of Nebraska Board of Regents. Owing in part to President Ronald Reagan's landslide victory over Democratic challenger Walter Mondale in the state, Exon only narrowly defeated Hoch, winning 52% of the vote.

== Democratic primary ==
=== Candidates ===
- J. James Exon, incumbent Senator

=== Results ===
Democratic primary results
Party	Candidate	Votes	%
Democratic	J. J. Exon (inc.)	135,242	99.32%
Democratic	Write-ins	930	0.68%
Total votes		136,172	100.00%

== Republican primary ==
=== Candidates ===
- Nancy Hoch, member of the University of Nebraska Board of Regents
- John DeCamp, State Senator
- Richard N. Thompson, Lincoln businessman and finance chairman of the Nebraska Republican Party
- Fred A. Lockwood, Gering accountant
- Ken Cameron, Blair salesman
- George A. Boucher, Ravenna agribusinessman

=== Results ===
Republican primary results
Party	Candidate	Votes	%
Republican	Nancy Hoch	61,009	40.46%
Republican	John DeCamp	24,730	16.40%
Republican	Richard N. Thompson	23,720	15.73%
Republican	Fred A. Lockwood	21,115	14.00%
Republican	Ken Cameron	16,123	10.69%
Republican	George A. Boucher	3,926	2.60%
Republican	Write-ins	178	0.12%
Total votes		150,801	100.00%

== General election ==
1984 United States Senate election in Nebraska
Party	Candidate	Votes	%	±%
Democratic	J. James Exon (inc.)	332,217	51.94%	−15.68%
Republican	Nancy Hoch	307,147	48.02%	+15.69%
Write-in		304	0.05%	—
Majority		25,070	3.92%	−31.37%
Total votes		639,668	100.00%	
Democratic hold				

== See also ==
- United States Senate elections, 1984
