= 2018 United States Senate election in Nebraska =

- November 6, 2018
- Turnout: 57.32%
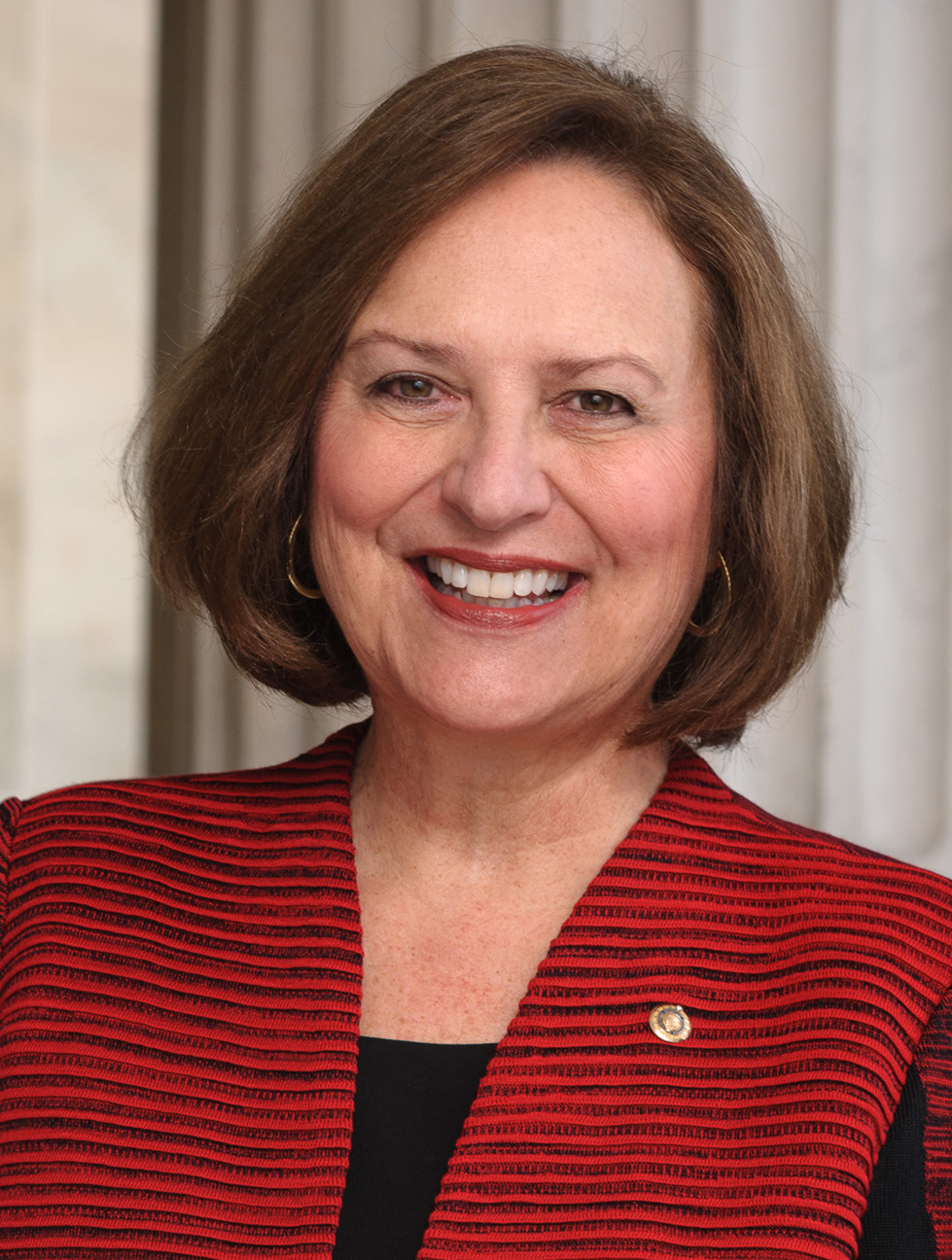

Nominee	Deb Fischer	Jane Raybould
Party	Republican	Democratic
Popular vote	403,151	269,917
Percentage	57.69%	38.62%
- Fischer: 40–50% 50–60% 60–70% 70–80% 80–90% >90% Raybould: 40–50% 50–60% 60–70% 70–80% 80–90% >90% Tie: 40–50% No votes
U.S. senator before election
Deb Fischer
Republican
Elected U.S. Senator
Deb Fischer
Republican

The 2018 United States Senate election in Nebraska took place on November 6, 2018, to elect a member of the United States Senate to represent the state of Nebraska. Incumbent Republican Deb Fischer was re-elected to a second term against Lincoln city councilwoman Jane Raybould and Libertarian candidate Jim Schultz.

The candidate filing deadline was March 1, 2018, and the primary election was held on May 15, 2018.

== Republican primary ==
=== Candidates ===
==== Nominated ====
- Deb Fischer, incumbent U.S. senator

==== Eliminated in primary ====
- Jack Heidel, retired University of Nebraska at Omaha professor
- Dennis Frank Macek
- Jeffrey Lynn Stein
- Todd Watson, businessman and independent candidate for the U.S. Senate in 2014

==== Declined ====
- Shane Osborn, former state treasurer and candidate for the U.S. Senate in 2014
- Don Stenberg, state treasurer, former attorney general, nominee for the U.S. Senate in 2000 and candidate in 1996, 2006 and 2012

=== Endorsements ===
Deb Fischer

Federal officials

- Donald Trump, president of the United States

Governors

- Dave Heineman, Nebraska (former)
- Kay Orr, Nebraska (former)
- Pete Ricketts, Nebraska
- Charles Thone, Nebraska (former)

U.S. senators

- Ben Sasse, Nebraska

U.S. representatives

- Don Bacon, Nebraska
- Jeff Fortenberry, Nebraska
- Adrian Smith, Nebraska

Statewide politicians

- Mike Foley, lieutenant governor
- Charlie Janssen, Auditor of Public Accounts
- Shane Osborn, former State Treasurer
- Doug Peterson, Attorney General
- Don Stenberg, State Treasurer and former Attorney General

Mayors

- Jean Stothert, Omaha

Organizations

- Maggie's List
- National Federation of Independent Business
- National Right to Life
- Nebraska Cattlemen
- Nebraska Farm Bureau
- Omaha Professional Fire Fighters Association, IAFF L385
- Susan B. Anthony List
- U.S. Chamber of Commerce

=== Results ===
Results by county: Fischer: 80–90%; 70–80%; 60–70%; 50–60%

Republican primary results
Party	Candidate	Votes	%
Republican	Deb Fischer (inc.)	128,157	75.79%
Republican	Todd F. Watson	19,661	11.63%
Republican	Jack Heidel	9,413	5.57%
Republican	Jeffrey Lynn Stein	6,380	3.77%
Republican	Dennis Frank Macek	5,483	3.24%
Total votes		169,094	100.00%

== Democratic primary ==
=== Candidates ===
==== Nominated ====
- Jane Raybould, Lincoln City Councilwoman, former Lancaster County Commissioner and nominee for lieutenant governor in 2014

==== Eliminated in primary ====
- Chris Janicek, businessman
- Larry Marvin, perennial candidate
- Frank Svoboda

=== Endorsements ===
Jane Raybould

U.S. senators

- Ben Nelson, Nebraska (2001–2013)

Local and statewide politicians

- Chris Beutler, mayor of Lincoln

Labor unions

- National Education Association Fund
- Nebraska State Education Association

Organizations

- End Citizens United
- League of Conservation Voters
- Planned Parenthood Action Fund
- Rachel's Action Network
- Sierra Club

=== Results ===
Results by county: Raybould: 80–90%; 70–80%; 60–70%; 50–60%; 40–50%; 30–40%; Svoboda: 50–60%; 40–50%; 30–40%

Democratic primary results
Party	Candidate	Votes	%
Democratic	Jane Raybould	59,067	63.75%
Democratic	Chris Janicek	18,752	20.24%
Democratic	Frank B. Svoboda	10,548	11.38%
Democratic	Larry Marvin	4,393	4.74%
Total votes		92,660	100.00%

== Libertarian primary ==
=== Candidates ===
==== Declared ====
- Jim Schultz

=== Results ===
Results by county: Schultz: 100%; No votes: No votes

Libertarian primary results
Party	Candidate	Votes	%
Libertarian	Jim Schultz	1,202	100.00%
Total votes		1,202	100.00%

== General election ==
=== Predictions ===
Source	Ranking	As of
The Cook Political Report	Safe R	October 26, 2018
Inside Elections	Safe R	November 1, 2018
Sabato's Crystal Ball	Safe R	November 5, 2018
Fox News	Likely R	July 9, 2018
CNN	Safe R	July 12, 2018
RealClearPolitics	Safe R	November 5, 2018

=== Debates ===
Host network/sponsors	Date	Link(s)	Participants	
Host network/sponsors	Date	Link(s)	Jane Raybould (D)	Deb Fischer (R)
KMTV-TV	August 27, 2018		Invited	Invited

=== Polling ===
Poll source	Date(s) administered	Sample size	Margin of error	Deb Fischer (R)	Jane Raybould (D)	Undecided
DFM Research	October 23–27, 2018	683	± 3.8%	54%	39%	7%
Grassroots Targeting (R)	Late June 2018	1,000	± 3.1%	63%	28%	–
Meeting Street Research (R-Fischer)	January 24–28, 2018	500	–	51%	34%	–
Public Policy Polling (D-Raybould)	November 10–12, 2017	1,190	± 2.8%	42%	31%	27%

Hypothetical polling

Poll source	Date(s) administered	Sample size	Margin of error	Generic Republican	Generic Democrat	Undecided
Meeting Street Research (R-Fischer)	January 24–28, 2018	500	–	47%	32%	–

=== Results ===
2018 United States Senate election in Nebraska
Party	Candidate	Votes	%	±%
Republican	Deb Fischer (inc.)	403,151	57.69%	−0.08%
Democratic	Jane Raybould	269,917	38.62%	−3.61%
Libertarian	Jim Schultz	25,349	3.63	—
Write-in		466	0.07%	—
Majority		133,234	19.06%	+3.52%
Total votes		698,883	100.00%	
Republican hold				

==== By county ====
From Secretary of State of Nebraska

County	Deb Fischer Republican		Jane Raybould Democratic		Jim Schultz Libertarian		Write-in		Total votes
County	%	#	%	#	%	#	%	#	Total votes
Adams	63.44%	6,487	32.61%	3,334	3.93%	402	0.02%	2	10,225
Antelope	81.56%	2,061	15.67%	396	2.65%	67	0.12%	3	2,527
Arthur	87.07%	202	10.34%	24	2.59%	6	0.00%	0	232
Banner	83.76%	263	12.42%	39	3.82%	12	0.00%	0	314
Blaine	84.79%	223	12.93%	34	2.28%	6	0.00%	0	263
Boone	76.56%	1,757	19.91%	457	3.22%	74	0.31%	7	2,295
Box Butte	72.51%	2,632	23.00%	835	4.41%	160	0.08%	3	3,630
Boyd	83.11%	797	13.35%	128	3.55%	34	0.00%	0	959
Brown	83.25%	1,153	13.72%	190	3.03%	42	0.00%	0	1,385
Buffalo	66.86%	10,939	29.12%	4,765	3.97%	650	0.04%	7	16,361
Burt	67.93%	1,995	28.46%	836	3.54%	104	0.07%	2	2,937
Butler	71.00%	2,470	25.04%	871	3.94%	137	0.03%	1	3,479
Cass	63.97%	6,787	31.98%	3,393	3.99%	423	0.06%	6	10,609
Cedar	81.56%	2,866	15.28%	537	3.16%	111	0.00%	0	3,514
Chase	85.73%	1,340	11.77%	184	2.43%	38	0.06%	1	1,563
Cherry	80.18%	1,913	13.16%	314	6.08%	145	0.59%	14	2,386
Cheyenne	78.76%	2,566	17.77%	579	3.41%	111	0.06%	2	3,258
Clay	73.87%	1,979	22.10%	592	4.03%	108	0.00%	0	2,679
Colfax	69.27%	1,731	27.73%	693	3.00%	75	0.00%	0	2,499
Cuming	79.45%	2,672	17.96%	604	2.56%	86	0.03%	1	3,363
Custer	81.78%	3,797	14.80%	687	3.40%	158	0.02%	1	4,643
Dakota	59.02%	2,677	37.28%	1,691	3.62%	164	0.09%	4	4,536
Dawes	68.79%	2,334	26.94%	914	4.19%	142	0.09%	3	3,393
Dawson	69.77%	4,363	26.50%	1,657	3.63%	227	0.10%	6	6,253
Deuel	80.61%	578	15.20%	109	4.18%	30	0.00%	0	717
Dixon	74.38%	1,655	21.93%	488	3.64%	81	0.04%	1	2,225
Dodge	64.90%	7,827	31.71%	3,824	3.36%	405	0.03%	4	12,060
Douglas	46.30%	94,777	50.35%	103,070	3.29%	6,727	0.06%	133	204,707
Dundy	84.07%	649	12.82%	99	2.98%	23	0.13%	1	772
Fillmore	67.99%	1,718	27.31%	690	4.67%	118	0.04%	1	2,527
Franklin	77.39%	1,044	18.90%	255	3.71%	50	0.00%	0	1,349
Frontier	79.90%	831	16.63%	173	3.46%	36	0.00%	0	1,040
Furnas	80.36%	1,719	15.61%	334	4.02%	86	0.00%	0	2,139
Gage	58.74%	4,896	36.28%	3,024	4.91%	409	0.07%	6	8,335
Garden	81.52%	816	13.89%	139	4.40%	44	0.20%	2	1,001
Garfield	83.48%	667	14.14%	113	2.25%	18	0.13%	1	799
Gosper	79.69%	667	17.56%	147	2.75%	23	0.00%	0	837
Grant	93.69%	282	4.65%	14	1.66%	5	0.00%	0	301
Greeley	73.57%	732	23.92%	238	2.51%	25	0.00%	0	995
Hall	62.45%	10,483	33.50%	5,624	3.96%	665	0.09%	15	16,787
Hamilton	74.88%	3,076	21.81%	896	3.24%	133	0.07%	3	4,108
Harlan	77.11%	1,149	19.26%	287	3.49%	52	0.13%	2	1,490
Hayes	89.06%	350	8.14%	32	2.54%	10	0.25%	1	393
Hitchcock	82.48%	890	14.27%	154	3.24%	35	0.00%	0	1,079
Holt	77.75%	3,226	17.47%	725	4.60%	191	0.17%	7	4,149
Hooker	82.96%	258	15.76%	49	0.96%	3	0.32%	1	311
Howard	70.20%	1,696	25.25%	610	4.51%	109	0.04%	1	2,416
Jefferson	64.22%	1,913	31.02%	924	4.63%	138	0.13%	4	2,979
Johnson	62.06%	1,101	32.75%	581	5.07%	90	0.11%	2	1,774
Kearney	74.22%	1,952	22.51%	592	3.23%	85	0.04%	1	2,630
Keith	79.19%	2,542	17.66%	567	3.12%	100	0.03%	1	3,210
Keya Paha	87.05%	336	10.88%	42	2.07%	8	0.00%	0	386
Kimball	81.30%	1,122	14.64%	202	3.99%	55	0.07%	1	1,380
Knox	78.37%	2,812	18.65%	669	2.98%	107	0.00%	0	3,588
Lancaster	42.22%	49,449	53.94%	63,175	3.77%	4,412	0.08%	95	117,131
Lincoln	71.99%	8,999	23.09%	2,886	4.85%	606	0.07%	9	12,500
Logan	90.80%	306	6.82%	23	2.37%	8	0.00%	0	337
Loup	80.46%	247	16.61%	51	2.93%	9	0.00%	0	307
Madison	75.61%	7,949	21.27%	2,236	3.07%	323	0.05%	5	10,513
McPherson	87.02%	228	8.40%	22	4.58%	12	0.00%	0	262
Merrick	76.21%	2,563	19.24%	647	4.52%	152	0.03%	1	3,363
Morrill	80.33%	1,699	14.56%	308	5.06%	107	0.05%	1	2,115
Nance	71.54%	885	25.46%	315	2.99%	37	0.00%	0	1,237
Nemaha	68.48%	1,788	27.84%	727	3.68%	96	0.00%	0	2,611
Nuckolls	75.40%	1,321	20.83%	365	3.77%	66	0.00%	0	1,752
Otoe	64.62%	4,098	31.17%	1,977	4.10%	260	0.11%	7	6,342
Pawnee	67.13%	774	28.79%	332	4.08%	47	0.00%	0	1,153
Perkins	82.60%	1,011	14.71%	180	2.70%	33	0.00%	0	1,224
Phelps	79.50%	3,068	17.39%	671	3.01%	116	0.10%	4	3,859
Pierce	84.59%	2,339	12.33%	341	3.04%	84	0.04%	1	2,765
Platte	75.85%	8,372	21.23%	2,343	2.87%	317	0.05%	5	11,037
Polk	75.20%	1,574	21.40%	448	3.39%	71	0.00%	0	2,093
Red Willow	78.49%	3,051	17.91%	696	3.60%	140	0.00%	0	3,887
Richardson	69.29%	2,137	27.82%	858	2.82%	87	0.06%	2	3,084
Rock	85.56%	569	11.88%	79	2.56%	17	0.00%	0	665
Saline	53.46%	2,255	41.06%	1,732	5.43%	229	0.05%	2	4,218
Sarpy	58.08%	39,306	37.99%	25,706	3.86%	2,610	0.08%	51	67,673
Saunders	68.06%	6,479	27.99%	2,664	3.90%	371	0.05%	5	9,519
Scotts Bluff	68.84%	7,398	26.87%	2,887	4.19%	450	0.10%	11	10,746
Seward	65.21%	4,607	30.77%	2,174	3.99%	282	0.03%	2	7,065
Sheridan	81.98%	1,670	13.50%	275	4.47%	91	0.05%	1	2,037
Sherman	67.67%	873	28.68%	370	3.57%	46	0.08%	1	1,290
Sioux	83.24%	447	12.85%	69	3.91%	21	0.00%	0	537
Stanton	80.36%	1,817	16.05%	363	3.58%	81	0.00%	0	2,261
Thayer	71.89%	1,606	24.13%	539	3.98%	89	0.00%	0	2,234
Thomas	86.09%	291	10.65%	36	3.25%	11	0.00%	0	338
Thurston	53.03%	970	44.67%	817	2.13%	39	0.16%	3	1,829
Valley	77.20%	1,388	19.97%	359	2.78%	50	0.06%	1	1,798
Washington	70.28%	6,462	26.52%	2,438	3.17%	291	0.03%	3	9,194
Wayne	74.21%	2,388	22.50%	724	3.26%	105	0.03%	1	3,218
Webster	73.09%	997	23.31%	318	3.59%	49	0.00%	0	1,364
Wheeler	82.85%	343	14.49%	60	2.66%	11	0.00%	0	414
York	71.41%	3,659	25.00%	1,281	3.51%	180	0.08%	4	5,124

Counties that flipped from Democratic to Republican

- Dakota (largest municipality: South Sioux City)
- Saline (largest municipality: Crete)
- Thurston (largest municipality: Pender)

==== By congressional district ====
Fischer won all three congressional districts.

District	Fischer	Raybould	Representative
1st	55%	42%	Jeff Fortenberry
2nd	49%	48%	Don Bacon
3rd	72%	24%	Adrian Smith
