= Lois Capps =

American politician (born 1938)

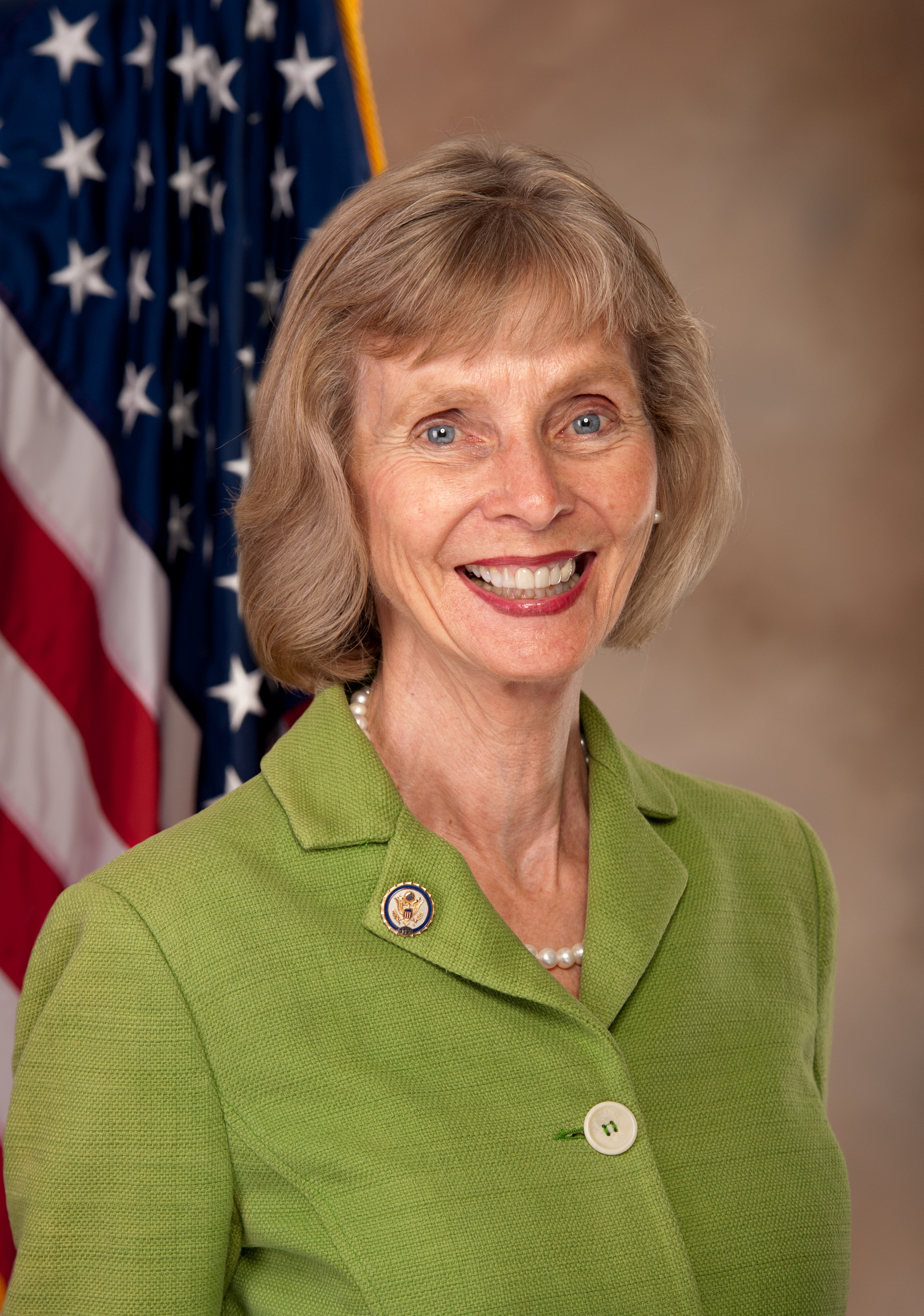

Member of the U.S. House of Representatives from California
- In office March 10, 1998 – January 3, 2017 (Note: Capps's official service begins on the date of the special election, while she was not sworn in until March 17, 1998.)
- Preceded by: Walter Capps
- Succeeded by: Salud Carbajal
- Constituency: 22nd district (1998–2003); 23rd district (2003–2013); 24th district (2013–2017)

Personal details
- Born: Lois Ragnhild Grimsrud; January 10, 1938 (age 88) Ladysmith, Wisconsin, U.S.
- Party: Democratic
- Spouse: Walter Capps (m. 1960; died 1997)
- Children: 3
- Education: Pacific Lutheran University (BS); Yale University (MA); University of California, Santa Barbara (MA)
- Capps's voice Capps on public awareness of strokes. Recorded May 17, 2006

Lois Ragnhild Capps (née Grimsrud; January 10, 1938) is an American politician who served as the U.S. representative for California's 24th congressional district from 1998 to 2017. She is a member of the Democratic Party. The district, numbered as the 22nd District from 1998 to 2003 and the 23rd from 2003 to 2013, includes all of Santa Barbara and San Luis Obispo counties and a portion of Ventura County.

Capps served on the U.S. House Committee on Energy and Commerce, where she was a member of the Energy and Air Quality Subcommittee and the Subcommittee on Health. She was a member of the New Democrat Coalition.

== Early life and education ==
Capps was born Lois Ragnhild Grimsrud in Ladysmith, Wisconsin, the daughter of Solveig Magdalene (née Gullixson) and Rev. Jurgen Milton Grimsrud, a Lutheran minister. Both of her parents' families came from Norway. She has lived in Santa Barbara since 1964. She was educated at Pacific Lutheran University with a bachelor's degree in nursing. She earned a Master of Arts in Religion at Yale Divinity School in 1964 and a Master of Arts in education at the University of California, Santa Barbara (UCSB) in 1990.

== U.S. House of Representatives ==
=== Elections ===
Walter Capps was elected to Congress in 1996 in a rematch of his 1994 race against Republican Andrea Seastrand. However, he died of a heart attack on October 28, 1997, only nine months into his term. His widow won the then-22nd District seat by defeating Republican Tom Bordonaro in a special election on March 10, 1998. She was sworn into the 105th Congress on March 17. Lois Capps defended her seat against Bordonaro in a general election later that year and commenced her first full term in office.

In 2000, Capps retained the 22nd district seat, defeating Republican Mike Stoker with 53% of the vote. She was the first Democrat to hold the district for more than one term in over 50 years (the district, known as the 11th from its formation in 1943 until 1953, the 13th from 1953 to 1975, and the 19th from 1975 to 1993, had been held by Republicans from 1947 until Walter Capps was sworn in 1997).

Capps' district was renumbered as the 23rd after the 2000 census and made somewhat safer, and she was reelected without serious opposition in 2002, 2004, 2006, 2008, and 2010. Her district was renumbered as the 24th District after the 2010 census. David Wasserman, House editor of The Cook Political Report, predicted that this would be a more difficult race, and local Republicans confirmed that Capps was one of their top targets in California. The reconfigured district still included Santa Barbara and San Luis Obispo, but was redrawn to include most of the more Republican inland areas of Santa Barbara County. Capps eventually beat her opponent, Abel Maldonado, with 54.8% of the vote.

In 2014, Capps ran against Republican Chris Mitchum, an actor, screenwriter, and businessman. Mitchum is the son of legendary film star Robert Mitchum. This was Mitchum's second consecutive try for the 24th district, having previously lost the 2012 primary to Abel Maldonado. In the closest race of her entire congressional career, Capps ultimately won with only a 3.8% margin over Mitchum.

Capps announced in April 2015 that she would not seek reelection in 2016.

=== Political positions ===
Capps has been described as a "solid liberal". In The Washingtonian magazine's 2006 "Best and Worst of Congress" poll of congressional staffers, Capps was named the nicest member of Congress.

In 2011, Capps voted for the National Defense Authorization Act for Fiscal Year 2012 as part of a controversial provision that allows the government and the military to detain American citizens and others without trial indefinitely.

Health care

Capps supported the Obama administration's economic stimulus and the Patient Protection and Affordable Care Act. She was strongly critical of the Stupak–Pitts Amendment to the latter, which placed limits on taxpayer-funding of abortions (except in the cases of rape, incest, or threat to the mother's life). Capps had earlier sponsored the Capps Amendment, which was defeated and replaced by the Stupak Amendment. Capps introduced the National Pediatric Research Network Act of 2013 which would, if enacted, authorize the NIH to support, fund, and coordinate data from research on rare pediatric diseases.

Foreign policy

In 2012, she was the only member of the House to vote "no" on Resolution 556 to condemn the government of Iran for its continued persecution, imprisonment, and sentencing of Youcef Nadarkhani of the charge of apostasy. The resolution passed 417–1 with 15 non-votes. Her spokeswoman later said that Capps strongly supported the resolution, but cast the no vote by mistake.

Environmental policy

In 2004, the House passed her legislation prohibiting "comprehensive inventory of oil and gas resources beneath the outer continental shelf." She was also a vocal opponent of drilling for oil in the Los Padres National Forest and offshore drilling off the coast of California.

=== Legislation sponsored ===
- H.R. 3008; 113th Congress -- "to provide for the conveyance of a small parcel of National Forest System land in Los Padres National Forest in California"—Capps introduced this bill, which would swap a parcel of federal land with the White Lotus Foundation in exchange for a parcel of their land. The White Lotus Foundation offers training in yoga and wanted the land to build better access to their site.

=== Committee assignments ===
- Committee on Energy and Commerce
  - Subcommittee on Energy and Power
  - Subcommittee on Environment and Economy
  - Subcommittee on Health

=== Caucus membership ===
- Co-chair of the Congressional Caucus on Women's Issues
- Co-chair of the National Marine Sanctuary Caucus
- Co-chair of the Congressional Coastal Caucus
- Co-chair of the Biomedical Research Caucus
- Co-chair of the House Cancer Caucus
- Co-chair of the Congressional Heart and Stroke Coalition
- Co-founder and co-chair of the Congressional Caucus on Infant Health and Safety
- Founded the Congressional Nursing Caucus
- Founded the School Health and Safety Caucus
- Member of the Veterinary Medicine Caucus

== Personal life ==
In 1960, while at Yale, she married Walter Capps, a divinity student who later became a prominent religious studies professor at UCSB; they eventually had three children. Walter died in 1997 and their eldest daughter died in 2000. Lois Capps worked for 20 years as a nurse and health advocate for the Santa Barbara public schools and also taught early childhood education part-time at Santa Barbara City College. Capps' daughter Laura was married to Bill Burton, a political consultant who served as Deputy White House Press Secretary in the Obama administration.

== Electoral history ==
Lois Capps electoral history

1998 United States House of Representatives Special Election in California
Party	Candidate	Votes	%
Democratic	Lois Capps	93,392	53.46%
Republican	Tom Bordonaro	78,224	44.78%
Libertarian	Robert Bakhaus	3,079	1.76%
Total votes		174,695	100.00%
Turnout			
Democratic hold			

1998 United States House of Representatives elections in California
Party	Candidate	Votes	%
Democratic	Lois Capps (incumbent)	111,388	55.09%
Republican	Tom J. Bordonaro Jr.	86,921	42.99%
Libertarian	Robert Bakhaus	2,618	1.29%
Reform	Richard D. "Dick" Porter	1,263	0.62%
Total votes		202,190	100.0%
Turnout			
Democratic hold			

2000 United States House of Representatives elections in California
Party	Candidate	Votes	%
Democratic	Lois Capps (incumbent)	135,538	53.2%
Republican	Mike Stoker	113,094	44.4%
Reform	Richard D. "Dick" Porter	2,490	0.9%
Libertarian	Joe Furcinite	2,060	0.8%
Natural Law	J. Carlos Aguirre	1,888	0.7%
Total votes		255,070	100.0%
Turnout			
Democratic hold			

2002 election
Party	Candidate	Votes	%
Democratic	Lois Capps (Redistricted incumbent)	95,752	59.1%
Republican	Beth Rogers	62,604	38.6%
Libertarian	James E. Hill	3,866	2.3%
Total votes		162,222	100.0%
Turnout			
Democratic hold			

2004 election
Party	Candidate	Votes	%
Democratic	Lois Capps (Incumbent)	153,980	63.1%
Republican	Don Regan	83,926	34.3%
Libertarian	Michael Favorite	6,391	2.6%
Total votes		244,297	100.0%
Turnout			
Democratic hold			

2006 election
Party	Candidate	Votes	%
Democratic	Lois Capps (Incumbent)	114,661	65.2%
Republican	Victor G. Tognazzini	61,272	34.8%
No party	H.A. Gardner Jr. (write-in)	18	0.0%
Total votes		175,951	100.0%
Turnout			
Democratic hold			

2008 election
Party	Candidate	Votes	%
Democratic	Lois Capps (Incumbent)	171,403	68.07%
Republican	Matt Kokkonen	80,385	31.93%
Total votes		251,788	100.00%
Turnout			77.41%
Democratic hold			

2010 election
Party	Candidate	Votes	%
Democratic	Lois Capps (Incumbent)	111,768	57.8%
Republican	Tom Watson	72,744	37.6%
Libertarian	Darrell M. Stafford	3,326	1.7%
No party	John V. Hager	5,625	2.9%
Total votes		193,463	100.0%
Turnout			
Democratic hold			

2012 election
Party	Candidate	Votes	%
Republican	Kevin McCarthy (Redistricted incumbent)	158,161	73.2%
No party preference	Terry Phillips	57,842	26.8%
Total votes		216,003	100.0%
Republican hold			

California's 24th congressional district election, 2012
Primary election
Party	Candidate	Votes	%
Democratic	Lois Capps (incumbent)	72,356	46.4
Republican	Abel Maldonado	46,295	29.7
Republican	Chris Mitchum	33,604	21.5
No party preference	Matt Boutté	3,832	2.5
Total votes		156,087	100.0
General election
Democratic	Lois Capps (incumbent)	156,749	55.1
Republican	Abel Maldonado	127,746	44.9
Total votes		284,495	100.0
Democratic hold			

California's 24th congressional district election, 2014
Primary election
Party	Candidate	Votes	%
Democratic	Lois Capps (incumbent)	45,482	44.5
Republican	Christopher Mitchum	15,927	15.6
Republican	Justin Donald Fareed	15,013	14.7
Republican	Dale Francisco	12,256	12.0
Republican	Bradley Allen	6,573	6.4
Democratic	Sandra J. Marshall-Eminger	3,675	3.6
Democratic	Paul H. Coyne, Jr.	1,753	1.7
No party preference	Steve Isakson	947	0.9
Republican	Alexis Stuart	527	0.5
Total votes		102,153	100.00
General election
Democratic	Lois Capps (incumbent)	103,228	52%
Republican	Christopher Mitchum	95,566	48%
Total votes		198,794	100%
Democratic hold			

== See also ==
- Women in the United States House of Representatives

U.S. House of Representatives
Preceded by Walter Capps	Member of the U.S. House of Representatives from California's 22nd congressional district 1998–2003	Succeeded by Bill Thomas
Preceded by Elton Gallegly	Member of the U.S. House of Representatives from California's 23rd congressional district 2003–2013	Succeeded by Kevin McCarthy
Preceded by Elton Gallegly	Member of the U.S. House of Representatives from California's 24th congressional district 2013–2017	Succeeded by Salud Carbajal
Preceded by Ginny Brown-Waite	Chair of the Congressional Women's Caucus; 2007–2009	Succeeded by Jan Schakowsky
Party political offices
Preceded by Hilda Solis	Chair of the Democratic Women's Working Group; 2007–2009	Succeeded by Jan Schakowsky
U.S. order of precedence (ceremonial)
Preceded by John Doolittle as Former U.S. Representative	Order of precedence of the United States as Former U.S. Representative	Succeeded by Les AuCoin as Former U.S. Representative
