= 1994 Nebraska gubernatorial election =

- November 8, 1994
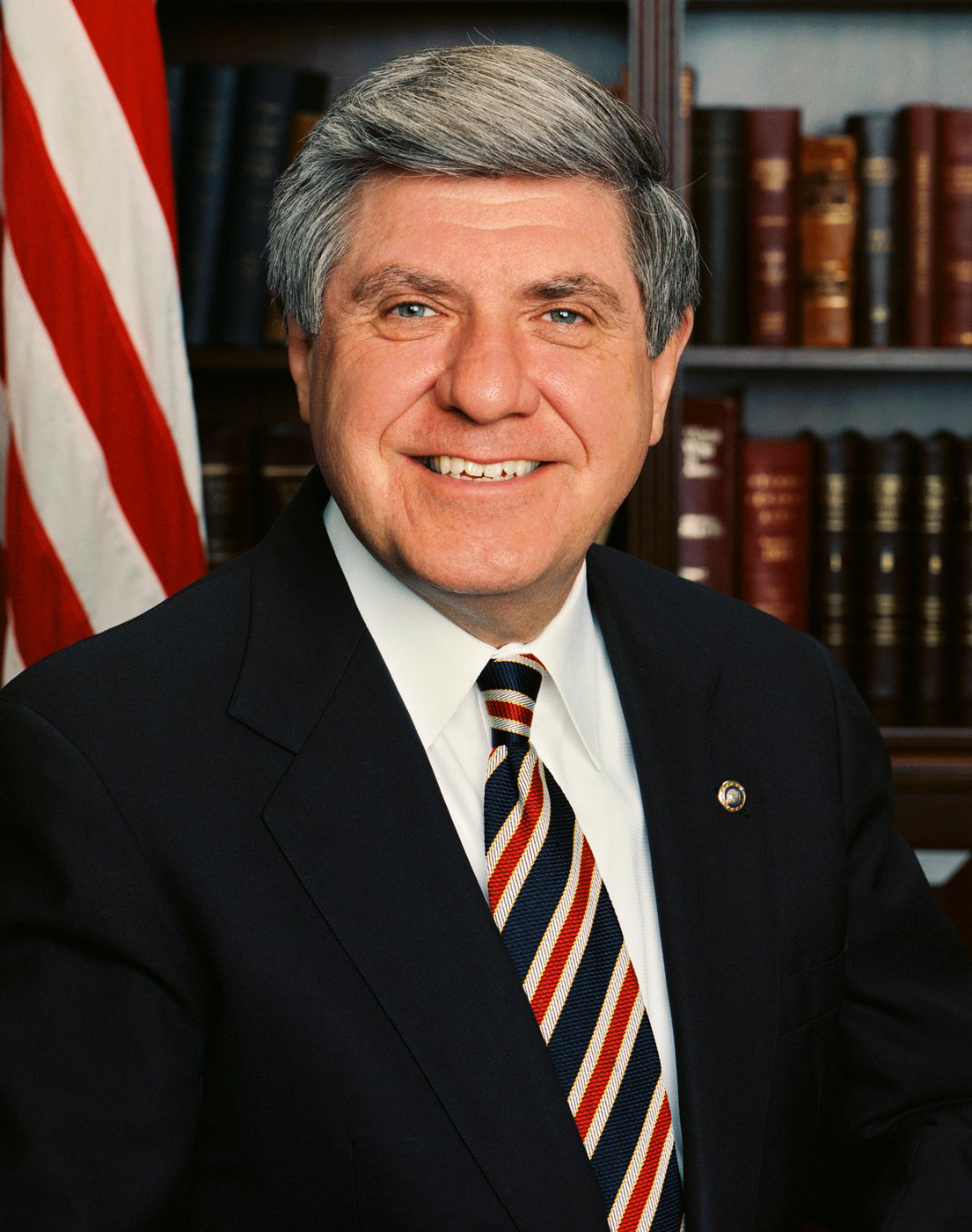

| Nominee | Ben Nelson | Gene Spence |
| Party | Democratic | Republican |
| Running mate | Kim Robak | Kate Witek |
| Popular vote | 423,270 | 148,230 |
| Percentage | 73.03% | 25.58% |
- County results Nelson: 50–60% 60–70% 70–80% 80–90% Spence: 50–60%
Governor before election
Ben Nelson
Democratic
Elected Governor
Ben Nelson
Democratic

The 1994 Nebraska gubernatorial election was held on November 8, 1994. Incumbent governor Ben Nelson won re-election to a second term in a landslide, defeating Republican businessman Gene Spence by 47.4 percentage points and sweeping all but two counties (Garden and Sheridan), despite the concurrent 1994 Republican Revolution. As of 2026, this is the last time that a Democrat was elected governor of Nebraska.

== Democratic primary ==
=== Governor ===
==== Candidates ====
- Ben Nelson, incumbent governor of Nebraska
- Robb Nimic
- Robert Franklin Winingar

==== Results ====
Democratic gubernatorial primary results
| Party | Candidate | Votes | % |
|---|---|---|---|
| Democratic | Ben Nelson (incumbent) | 101,422 | 88.10 |
| Democratic | Robert Franklin Winingar | 6,993 | 6.07 |
| Democratic | Robb Nimic | 6,373 | 5.54 |
| Democratic | Write-ins | 327 | 0.28 |
| Total votes | | 115,115 | 100.00 |

=== Lieutenant governor ===
==== Candidates ====
Kim Robak ran unopposed for the Democratic nomination for lieutenant governor. She was the incumbent Nebraska Lieutenant Governor who was appointed in 1993 by Governor Ben Nelson after Maxine Moul resigned.

==== Results ====
Democratic lieutenant gubernatorial primary results
| Party | Candidate | Votes | % |
|---|---|---|---|
| Democratic | Kim Robak (incumbent) | 94,936 | 99.53 |
| Democratic | Write-ins | 447 | 0.47 |
| Total votes | | 95,383 | 100.00 |

== Republican primary ==
=== Governor ===
==== Candidates ====
- John DeCamp, former Nebraska State Senator
- Alan Jacobsen, roofing company owner
- Ralph Knobel, farmer and former chairman of the Republican Party of Nebraska
- Gene Spence, businessman
- Mort Sullivan, perennial candidate

==== Results ====
Republican gubernatorial primary results
| Party | Candidate | Votes | % |
|---|---|---|---|
| Republican | Gene Spence | 69,529 | 38.07 |
| Republican | Ralph Knobel | 57,719 | 31.60 |
| Republican | Alan Jacobsen | 27,374 | 14.99 |
| Republican | John DeCamp | 24,414 | 13.37 |
| Republican | Mort Sullivan | 3,363 | 1.84 |
| Republican | Write-ins | 234 | 0.13 |
| Total votes | | 182,633 | 100.00 |

=== Lieutenant governor ===
==== Candidates ====
- De Carlson, co-owner of the Upper Missouri Trading Company and former member of the board of governors of Northeast Community College from Crofton, Nebraska
- Willie J. Carr, Jr. from Omaha, Nebraska, who filed as a pauper candidate (meaning he didn't pay the filing fee) and did not conduct an active campaign
- Horace "Hoss" Dannehl, feed dealer and livestock breeder from Riverdale, Nebraska
- Kate Witek, member of the Nebraska Legislature in District 31 since 1993 from Omaha, Nebraska.

==== Results ====
Republican lieutenant gubernatorial primary results
| Party | Candidate | Votes | % |
|---|---|---|---|
| Republican | Kate Witek | 68,113 | 44.80 |
| Republican | De Carlson | 47,262 | 31.09 |
| Republican | Hoss Dannehl | 20,437 | 13.44 |
| Republican | Willie J. Carr, Jr. | 16,111 | 10.60 |
| Republican | Write-ins | 114 | 0.07 |
| Total votes | | 152,037 | 100.00 |

== General election ==
=== Campaign ===
Though Nelson ultimately did approve of an action to prevent foster children from living with homosexuals or unmarried couples after he was re-elected, Spence hammered the governor for not supporting restrictions on foster homes. Ultimately, four weeks before the elections, many prominent Republicans accused Spence of "throwing in the towel" and essentially conceding defeat to Nelson before any ballots were cast. The divided Republican primary and Gene Spence's inability to unite the party following his plurality victory in the primary eventually led to Nelson's overwhelming re-election.

=== Results ===
Nebraska gubernatorial election, 1994
| Party | Candidate | Votes | % |
|---|---|---|---|
| Democratic | Ben Nelson (incumbent) | 423,270 | 73.03% |
| Republican | Gene Spence | 148,230 | 25.58% |
| Write-in | Ernie Chambers | 2,510 | 0.43% |
| Write-in | Others | 5,551 | 0.96% |
| Total votes | | 579,561 | 100.0% |
| Democratic hold | | | |

==== By County ====
By county

| County | Person Democratic | | Person Republican | | Various candidates Other parties | | Margin | | Total votes |
| County | # | % | # | % | # | % | # | % | Total votes |
|---|---|---|---|---|---|---|---|---|---|
| Adams County | | | | | | | | | |
| Antelope County | | | | | | | | | |
| Arthur County | | | | | | | | | |
| Banner County | | | | | | | | | |
| Blaine County | | | | | | | | | |
| Boone County | | | | | | | | | |
| Box Butte County | | | | | | | | | |
| Boyd County | | | | | | | | | |
| Brown County | | | | | | | | | |
| Buffalo County | | | | | | | | | |
| Burt County | | | | | | | | | |
| Butler County | | | | | | | | | |
| Cass County | | | | | | | | | |
| Cedar County | | | | | | | | | |
| Chase County | | | | | | | | | |
| Cherry County | | | | | | | | | |
| Cheyenne County | | | | | | | | | |
| Clay County | | | | | | | | | |
| Colfax County | | | | | | | | | |
| Cuming County | | | | | | | | | |
| Custer County | | | | | | | | | |
| Dakota County | | | | | | | | | |
| Dawes County | | | | | | | | | |
| Dawson County | | | | | | | | | |
| Deuel County | | | | | | | | | |
| Dixon County | | | | | | | | | |
| Dodge County | | | | | | | | | |
| Douglas County | | | | | | | | | |
| Dundy County | | | | | | | | | |
| Fillmore County | | | | | | | | | |
| Franklin County | | | | | | | | | |
| Frontier County | | | | | | | | | |
| Furnas County | | | | | | | | | |
| Gage County | | | | | | | | | |
| Garden County | | | | | | | | | |
| Garfield County | | | | | | | | | |
| Gosper County | | | | | | | | | |
| Grant County | | | | | | | | | |
| Greeley County | | | | | | | | | |
| Hall County | | | | | | | | | |
| Hamilton County | | | | | | | | | |
| Hayes County | | | | | | | | | |
| Hitchcock County | | | | | | | | | |
| Holt County | | | | | | | | | |
| Hooker County | | | | | | | | | |
| Howard County | | | | | | | | | |
| Jefferson County | | | | | | | | | |
| Johnson County | | | | | | | | | |
| Kearney County | | | | | | | | | |
| Keith County | | | | | | | | | |
| Keya Paha County | | | | | | | | | |
| Kimball County | | | | | | | | | |
| Knox County | | | | | | | | | |
| Lancaster County | | | | | | | | | |
| Lincoln County | | | | | | | | | |
| Logan County | | | | | | | | | |
| Loup County | | | | | | | | | |
| Madison County | | | | | | | | | |
| McPherson County | | | | | | | | | |
| Merrick County | | | | | | | | | |
| Morrill County | | | | | | | | | |
| Nance County | | | | | | | | | |
| Nance County | | | | | | | | | |
| Nemaha County | | | | | | | | | |
| Nuckolls County | | | | | | | | | |
| Otoe County | | | | | | | | | |
| Pawnee County | | | | | | | | | |
| Perkins County | | | | | | | | | |
| Phelps County | | | | | | | | | |
| Pierce County | | | | | | | | | |
| Platte County | | | | | | | | | |
| Polk County | | | | | | | | | |
| Red Willow County | | | | | | | | | |
| Richardson County | | | | | | | | | |
| Rock County | | | | | | | | | |
| Saline County | | | | | | | | | |
| Sarpy County | | | | | | | | | |
| Saunders County | | | | | | | | | |
| Scotts Bluff County | | | | | | | | | |
| Seward County | | | | | | | | | |
| Sheridan County | | | | | | | | | |
| Sioux County | | | | | | | | | |
| Stanton County | | | | | | | | | |
| Thayer County | | | | | | | | | |
| Stanton County | | | | | | | | | |
| Thurston County | | | | | | | | | |
| Valley County | | | | | | | | | |
| Washington County | | | | | | | | | |
| Wayne County | | | | | | | | | |
| Webster County | | | | | | | | | |
| Wheeler County | | | | | | | | | |
| York County | | | | | | | | | |
| Totals | | | | | | | | | |
