= Kim Robak =

American politician (born 1955)

35th Lieutenant Governor of Nebraska
- In office October 6, 1993 – January 7, 1999
- Governor: Ben Nelson
- Preceded by: Maxine Moul
- Succeeded by: David Maurstad

37th Chair of the National Lieutenant Governors Association
- In office 1996–1997
- Preceded by: Joy Corning
- Succeeded by: Mary Fallin

Personal details
- Born: October 4, 1955 (age 70) Columbus, Nebraska, U.S.
- Party: Democratic
- Education: University of Nebraska–Lincoln (BS, JD)

Kim M. Robak (born October 4, 1955) is an American lawyer, lobbyist, and retired politician from Nebraska. She is a member of the Democratic Party.

Robak was appointed the 35th lieutenant governor of Nebraska by Governor Ben Nelson, following the resignation of incumbent Maxine B. Moul in 1993. She was elected to a full term in 1994, ultimately serving from October 1993 to January 1999. Previously, she served as Chief of Staff to Governor Nelson (1991–1992) and Legal Counsel to Governors Ben Nelson, Kay Orr, and Bob Kerrey.

She is currently a senior partner in Mueller Robak, LLC. Previously, she was the vice president of external affairs and corporation secretary for the University of Nebraska–Lincoln (1999–2004). She also serves on the board of directors for the Ameritas Mutual Holding Company and Ameritas Life Insurance Corp.

Her mother was Jennie Robak, who served in the Nebraska Legislature.

== See also ==
- List of female lieutenant governors in the United States

Party political offices
Preceded by Maxine Moul	Democratic nominee for Lieutenant Governor of Nebraska; 1994	Succeeded by Pam Bataillon
Political offices
Preceded by Maxine B. Moul	Lieutenant Governor of Nebraska; 1993–1999	Succeeded by David I. Maurstad
