= National Pediatric Research Network Act of 2013 =

- Long title: To amend title IV of the Public Health Service Act to provide for a National Pediatric Research Network, including with respect to pediatric rare diseases or conditions.
- Announced in: the 113th United States Congress
- Sponsored by: Rep. Lois Capps (D, CA-24)
- Number of co-sponsors: 5

Codification
- Acts affected: Public Health Service Act
- U.S.C. sections created: 42 U.S.C. 284h,
- Agencies affected: National Institutes of Health, Centers for Disease Control and Prevention, Food and Drug Administration

Legislative history
- Introduced in the House as H.R. 225 by Rep. Lois Capps (D, CA-24) on January 14, 2013; Committee consideration by United States House Committee on Energy and Commerce, Passed the House on February 4, 2013 (Roll Call Vote 31: 375-27)

National Pediatric Research Network Act of 2013 (H.R. 225) is a bill in the 113th United States Congress on February 4, 2013. It passed the United States House of Representatives and was sent to the Senate, where it was referred to the United States Senate Committee on Health, Education, Labor, and Pensions.

The purpose of the bill is "to amend title IV of the Public Health Service Act to provide for a National Pediatric Research Network, including with respect to pediatric rare diseases or conditions." The bill has received some support for researchers in the area of pediatric health who support the bill's goal of facilitating research, although there are some concerns about avoiding the creation of government red tape.

== Background ==
In the 112th United States Congress a previous version of the Bill passed twice, one as a stand-alone bill and one as part of a larger piece of legislation. Neither version was adopted because they did not make it out of the Senate.

== Procedural history ==
=== Introduction ===
The Bill was introduced on January 14, 2013 by Rep. Lois Capps (D-CA). She was joined by Rep. Cathy McMorris Rodgers (R-WA) and four other original cosponsors.

==== Sponsor ====
- Rep. Lois Capps (D-CA)

==== Original Co-Sponsors ====
- Rep. Cathy McMorris Rodgers (R-WA)
- Rep. Diana DeGette (D-CO)
- Rep. Gregg Harper (R-MS)
- Rep. Doris O. Matsui (D-CA)
- Rep. Peter T. King (R-NY)

==== Additional Co-Sponsors ====
- Rep. Donna M. Christensen (D-VI)
- Rep. Janice D. Schakowsky (D-IL)
- Rep. Henry A. Waxman (D-CA)
- Rep. Frank Pallone Jr. (D-NJ)
- Rep. Kathy Castor (D-FL)

=== Committee ===
The Bill was referred to the United States House Committee on Energy and Commerce. It was reported out of Committee on February 4, 2013.

=== Final debate and passage ===
The Bill was passed by the House on February 4, 2013 by a vote of 375-27. It was considered under a suspension of the rules, something which typically only happens in the case of noncontroversial bills.

=== Senate Referral ===
After being passed by the House, the Bill was received by the United States Senate on February 7, 2013 and referred to the United States Senate Committee on Health, Education, Labor, and Pensions.

== Provisions/Elements of the bill ==
The National Pediatric Research Network Act of 2013 (113hr225ih). A bill, H.R. 225, that was introduced into the United States House of Representatives in the 113th Congress. The bill passed the House on February 4, 2013.

The Bill would amend the Public Health Service Act to authorize the Director of the National Institutes of Health (NIH), in carrying out the Pediatric Research Initiative, to establish a National Pediatric Research Network.

The bill authorizes the Director of the NIH to award funding to public or private nonprofit groups that those groups can use to plan, establish, or improve pediatric research consortia. The money can also be used to provide basic operating support for those consortia, including doing actual clinical research and training other researchers. The awards should go to 20 or fewer consortia. The Bill goes into greater specifics about the characteristics of these consortia and the rules they must agree to follow in order to get the funding. The bill indicates that this support will be for five years, with the option of a renewal.

The bill also requires the Director of the NIH to ensure that some of the awards go to consortia that will focus primarily on pediatric rare diseases of conditions and their treatment. It also requires the creation of a data coordinating center to help network different doctors, hospitals, and clinics so that their research can be pooled. The bill also includes a variety of reporting requirements and established a requirement that the consortia cooperate with the Centers for Disease Control and Prevention (CDC) to track patients.

== See also ==
- United States Public Health Service
- Public Health Service Act
- Title 42 of the United States Code
