= 2006 United States Senate election in Nebraska =

- November 7, 2006
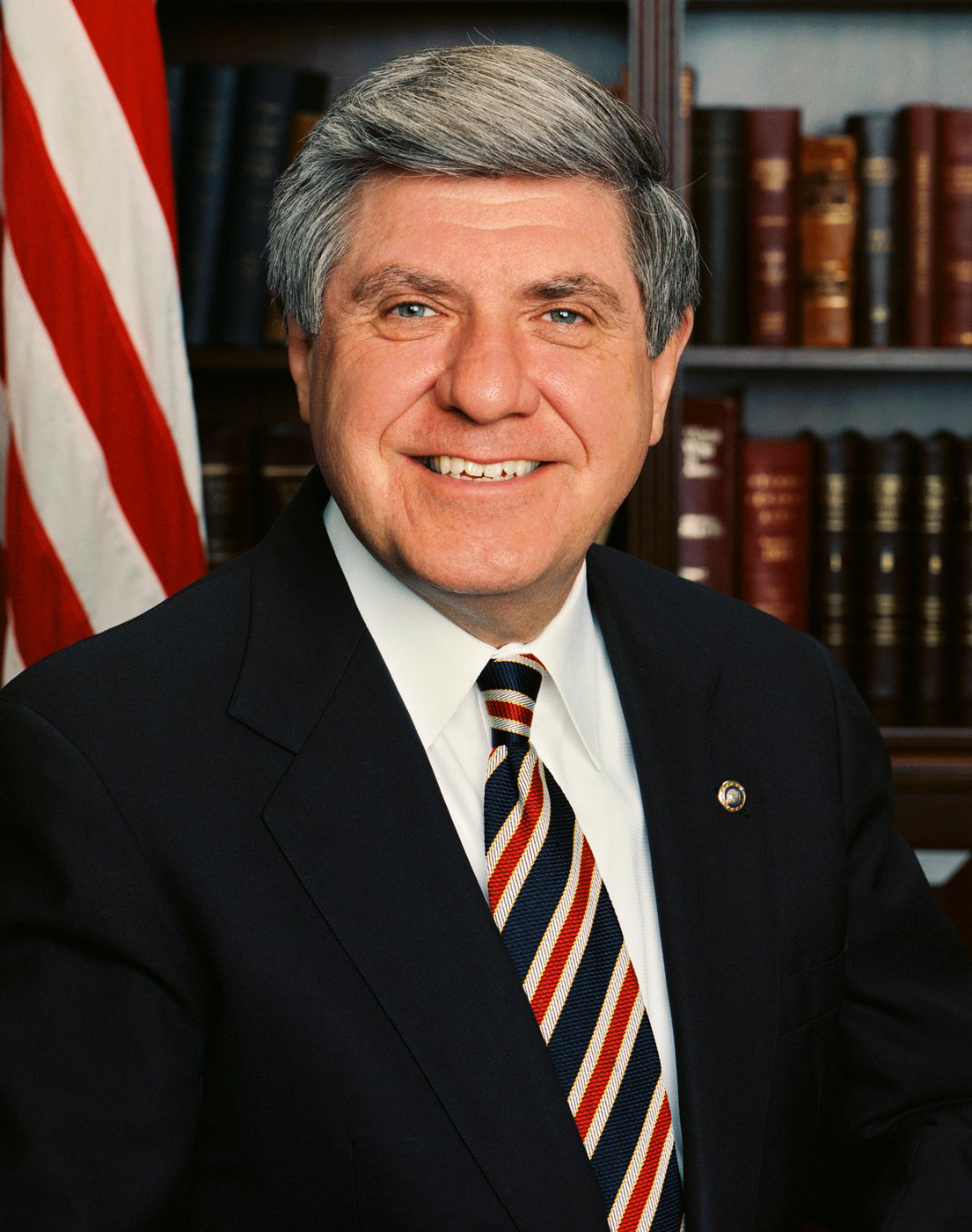

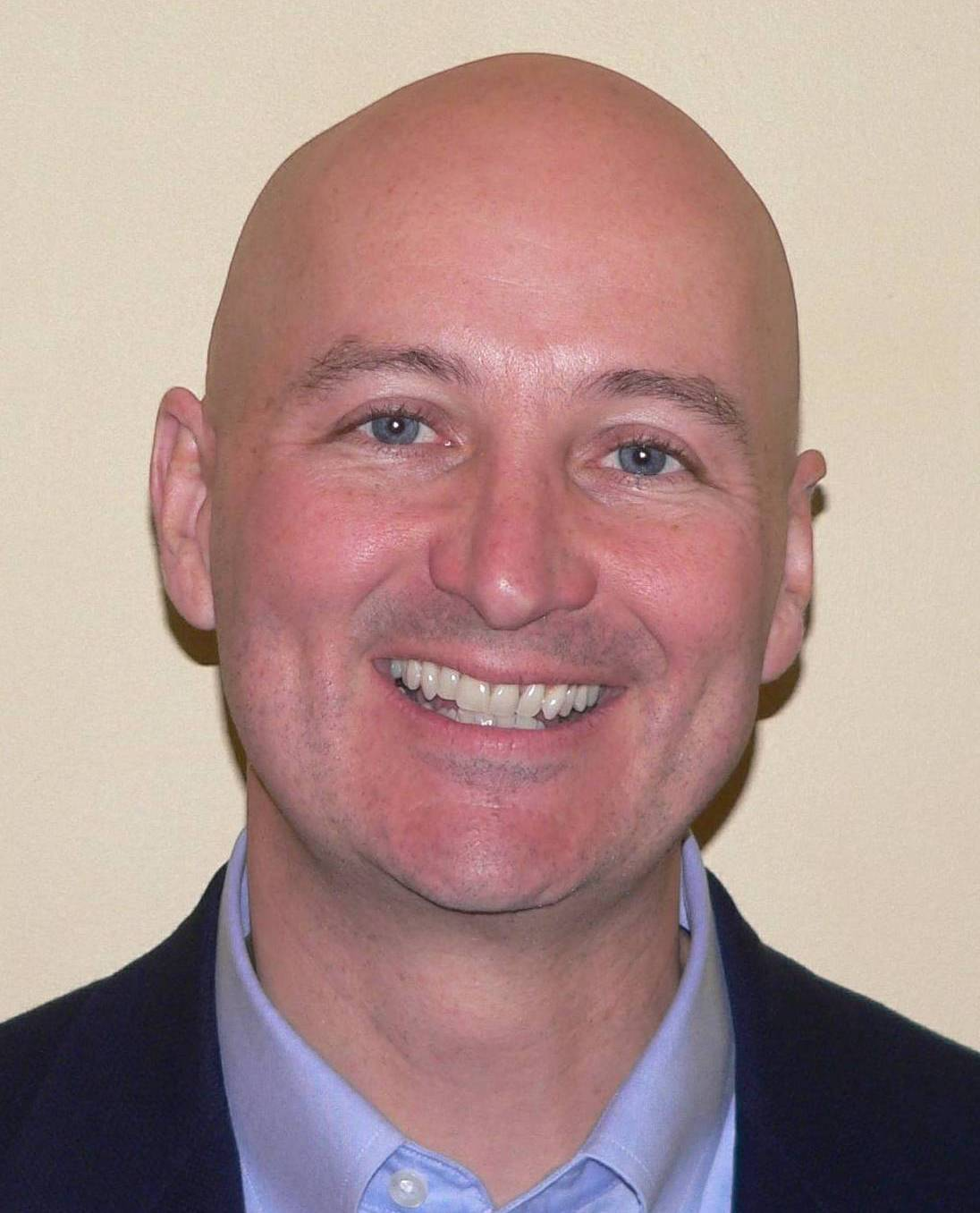
Nominee	Ben Nelson	Pete Ricketts
Party	Democratic	Republican
Popular vote	378,388	213,928
Percentage	63.88%	36.12%
- Nelson: 40–50% 50–60% 60–70% 70–80% 80–90% >90% Ricketts: 40–50% 50–60% 60–70% 70–80% 80–90% >90% Tie: 40–50% 50% No data
U.S. senator before election
Ben Nelson
Democratic
Elected U.S. Senator
Ben Nelson
Democratic

The 2006 United States Senate election in Nebraska was held on November 7, 2006. Incumbent Democrat Ben Nelson won re-election to a second term, easily defeating Republican Pete Ricketts. Nelson won 63.9% of the vote to Ricketts's 36.1%. Ricketts was later appointed in January 2023 to Nebraska's other Senate seat after serving as Governor of Nebraska from 2015 to 2023.

This was one of five Democratic-held Senate seats up for election in a state that George W. Bush won in the 2004 presidential election.

As of 2026, this remains the last time Democrats won any statewide election in Nebraska. This was the first election since 1978 that the winner was of a different party than the concurrent gubernatorial election.

== Democratic primary ==
=== Candidates ===
- Ben Nelson, incumbent U.S. Senator

=== Results ===
Democratic primary results
Party	Candidate	Votes	%
Democratic	Ben Nelson (inc.)	92,501	100.00%
Total votes		92,501	100.00%

== Republican primary ==
=== Candidates ===
- Pete Ricketts, former COO of TD Ameritrade
- Don Stenberg, former Attorney General of Nebraska and nominee for the U.S. Senate in 2000
- David J. Kramer, Former Chairman of the Nebraska Republican Party

=== Campaign ===
Since Ricketts was a millionaire, he could finance his own campaign. His opponents could not raise enough money to keep up. Kramer raised $330,000 and Stenberg raised $246,000 in 2005.

=== Results ===
Republican primary results by county Ricketts: 30–40%; 40–50%; 50–60%; 60–70%; Stenberg: 30–40%; 40–50%; 50–60%

Republican primary results
Party	Candidate	Votes	%
Republican	Pete Ricketts	129,643	48.14%
Republican	Don Stenberg	96,496	35.83%
Republican	David J. Kramer	43,185	16.03%
Total votes		269,324	100.00%

== General election ==
=== Candidates ===
- Ben Nelson (D), incumbent U.S. Senator
- Pete Ricketts (R), former COO of TD Ameritrade

=== Campaign ===
The primary election was held May 9, 2006. Pete Ricketts won the Republican nomination with 48% of the vote. Ben Nelson was unopposed for the Democratic nomination. Nelson was elected in 2000 by a margin of 51% to 49% after serving as the state's governor for two terms. Nelson, considered the most conservative Democrat in the Senate, was the lone Democrat in Nebraska's Congressional delegation. This election was one of the most expensive in Nebraska history. In 2005, Ben Nelson raised $3.9 million for his re-election campaign. Pete Ricketts contributed $14.35 million of his own money to his campaign; he raised an additional $485,000 in contributions. The race also attracted national attention and generated several high-level campaign appearances. President George W. Bush appeared at a rally for Ricketts on November 5, 2006, in Grand Island, while then-U.S. Senator Barack Obama appeared at a fundraiser for Nelson and other Nebraska Democrats on May 5, 2006, in Omaha. However, he won re-election by a large margin.

=== Predictions ===
Source	Ranking	As of
The Cook Political Report	Solid D	November 6, 2006
Sabato's Crystal Ball	Likely D	November 6, 2006
Rothenberg Political Report	Likely D	November 6, 2006
Real Clear Politics	Safe D	November 6, 2006

=== Polling ===
Source	Date	Ben Nelson (D)	Pete Ricketts (R)
Rasmussen	November 23, 2005	52%	29%
Rasmussen	April 26, 2006	54%	36%
Rasmussen	May 13, 2006	54%	35%
Rasmussen	July 17, 2006	57%	31%
Rasmussen	August 17, 2006	55%	32%
Rasmussen	September 26, 2006	55%	32%
Rasmussen	October 19, 2006	54%	34%

=== Results ===
2006 United States Senate election in Nebraska
Party	Candidate	Votes	%	±%
Democratic	Ben Nelson (incumbent)	378,388	63.88%	+12.88%
Republican	Pete Ricketts	213,928	36.12%	−12.70%
Majority		164,460	27.83%	+25.65%
Total votes		590,961	100.00%	
Democratic hold				

==== By county ====
From CNN

County	Ben Nelson Democratic		Pete Ricketts Republican		Total votes
County	%	#	%	#	Total votes
Adams	67.18%	10,222	32.82%	4,993	15,215
Antelope	57.54%	1,556	42.46%	1,148	2,704
Arthur	40.60%	95	59.40%	139	234
Banner	47.85%	156	52.15%	170	326
Blaine	54.95%	150	45.05%	123	273
Boone	65.23%	1,664	34.77%	887	2,551
Box Butte	68.23%	2,489	31.77%	1,159	3,648
Boyd	63.53%	622	36.47%	357	979
Brown	51.09%	706	48.91%	676	1,382
Buffalo	56.41%	8,367	43.59%	6,466	14,833
Burt	69.49%	2,034	30.51%	893	2,927
Butler	73.10%	2,527	26.90%	930	3,457
Cass	62.85%	5,819	37.15%	3,440	9,259
Cedar	66.34%	2,608	33.66%	1,323	3,931
Chase	49.05%	799	50.95%	830	1,629
Cherry	53.17%	1,436	46.83%	1,265	2,701
Cheyenne	46.18%	1,450	53.82%	1,690	3,140
Clay	64.47%	1,662	35.53%	916	2,578
Colfax	69.44%	1,947	30.56%	857	2,804
Cuming	63.45%	1,953	36.55%	1,125	3,078
Custer	58.88%	2,880	41.12%	2,011	4,891
Dakota	69.32%	3,260	30.68%	1,443	4,703
Dawes	57.42%	1,706	42.58%	1,265	2,971
Dawson	58.66%	3,910	41.34%	2,755	6,665
Deuel	48.70%	392	51.30%	413	805
Dixon	66.54%	1,589	33.46%	799	2,388
Dodge	66.70%	7,950	33.30%	3,969	11,919
Douglas	65.16%	92,133	34.84%	49,257	141,390
Dundy	61.16%	570	38.84%	362	932
Fillmore	71.49%	1,780	28.51%	710	2,490
Franklin	64.88%	946	35.12%	512	1,458
Frontier	65.34%	820	34.66%	435	1,255
Furnas	65.55%	1,347	34.45%	708	2,055
Gage	72.98%	6,451	27.02%	2,388	8,839
Garden	48.45%	500	51.55%	532	1,032
Garfield	59.09%	543	40.91%	376	919
Gosper	62.89%	622	37.11%	367	989
Grant	40.85%	134	59.15%	194	328
Greeley	75.99%	807	24.01%	255	1,062
Hall	61.52%	10,371	38.48%	6,487	16,858
Hamilton	59.36%	2,660	40.64%	1,821	4,481
Harlan	64.63%	1,124	35.37%	615	1,739
Hayes	57.09%	282	42.91%	212	494
Hitchcock	68.10%	824	31.90%	386	1,210
Holt	51.44%	2,288	48.56%	2,160	4,448
Hooker	56.23%	185	43.77%	144	329
Howard	69.16%	1,803	30.84%	804	2,607
Jefferson	71.41%	2,265	28.59%	907	3,172
Johnson	75.18%	1,369	24.82%	452	1,821
Kearney	58.76%	1,614	41.24%	1,133	2,747
Keith	48.79%	1,588	51.21%	1,667	3,255
Keya Paha	54.50%	303	45.50%	253	556
Kimball	46.42%	753	53.58%	869	1,622
Knox	63.65%	2,054	36.35%	1,173	3,227
Lancaster	70.07%	60,309	29.93%	25,762	86,071
Lincoln	61.23%	7,664	38.77%	4,852	12,516
Logan	52.51%	199	47.49%	180	379
Loup	64.36%	242	35.64%	134	376
Madison	54.61%	5,730	45.39%	4,762	10,492
McPherson	44.83%	117	55.17%	144	261
Merrick	63.24%	1,923	36.76%	1,118	3,041
Morrill	48.48%	912	51.52%	969	1,881
Nance	71.70%	1,206	28.30%	476	1,682
Nemaha	61.79%	1,745	38.21%	1,079	2,824
Nuckolls	66.98%	1,375	33.02%	678	2,053
Otoe	62.51%	3,550	37.49%	2,129	5,679
Pawnee	67.39%	835	32.61%	404	1,239
Perkins	52.97%	669	47.03%	594	1,263
Phelps	57.90%	2,269	42.10%	1,650	3,919
Pierce	55.99%	1,378	44.01%	1,083	2,461
Platte	62.97%	6,664	37.03%	3,919	10,583
Polk	62.92%	1,432	37.08%	844	2,276
Red Willow	70.60%	3,016	29.40%	1,256	4,272
Richardson	64.63%	2,226	35.37%	1,218	3,444
Rock	54.99%	413	45.01%	338	751
Saline	78.78%	3,615	21.22%	974	4,589
Sarpy	59.27%	24,640	40.73%	16,935	41,575
Saunders	67.62%	5,393	32.38%	2,582	7,975
Scotts Bluff	51.98%	5,834	48.02%	5,389	11,223
Seward	67.39%	3,930	32.61%	1,902	5,832
Sheridan	43.55%	820	56.45%	1,063	1,883
Sherman	70.99%	1,018	29.01%	416	1,434
Sioux	39.85%	216	60.15%	326	542
Stanton	53.92%	1,067	46.08%	912	1,979
Thayer	70.16%	1,627	29.84%	692	2,319
Thomas	53.12%	179	46.88%	158	337
Thurston	73.89%	1,296	26.11%	458	1,754
Valley	61.90%	1,290	38.10%	794	2,084
Washington	57.95%	4,394	42.05%	3,189	7,583
Wayne	63.90%	1,963	36.10%	1,109	3,072
Webster	67.36%	1,164	32.64%	564	1,728
Wheeler	65.72%	255	34.28%	133	388
York	57.50%	3,118	42.50%	2,305	5,423

Counties that flipped from Republican to Democratic

- Burt (largest village: Tekamah)
- Antelope (largest city: Neligh)
- Box Butte (largest city: Alliance)
- Boyd (largest city: Spencer)
- Brown (largest city: Ainsworth)
- Buffalo (largest city: Kearney)
- Butler (largest city: David City)
- Cherry (largest city: Valentine)
- Clay (largest city: Sutton)
- Colfax (largest city: Schuyler)
- Cuming (largest city: West Point)
- Custer (largest city: Broken Bow)
- Dawes (largest city: Chadron)
- Dawson (largest city: Lexington)
- Dundy (largest city: Benkelman)
- Franklin (largest city: Franklin)
- Frontier (largest city: Curtis)
- Furnas (largest city: Cambridge)
- Garfield (largest city: Burwell)
- Gosper (largest city: Elwood)
- Grant (largest city: Hyannis)
- Hamilton (largest city: Aurora)
- Harlan (largest city: Alma)
- Hayes (largest city: Palisade)
- Hitchcock (largest city: Culbertson)
- Holt (largest city: O'Neill)
- Hooker (largest city: Mullen)
- Kearney (largest city: Minden)
- Keya Paha (largest city: Springview)
- Knox (largest city: Creighton)
- Logan (largest city: Stapleton)
- Loup (largest city: Taylor)
- Madison (largest city: Norfolk)
- Merrick (largest city: Central City)
- Nemaha (largest city: Auburn)
- Nance (largest city: Fullerton)
- Nuckolls (largest city: Superior)
- Boone (largest city: Albion)
- Perkins (largest city: Grant)
- Phelps (largest city: Holdrege)
- Pierce (largest city: Pierce)
- Platte (largest city: Columbus)
- Polk (largest city: Stromsburg)
- Richardson (largest city: Falls City)
- Rock (largest city: Bassett)
- Sarpy (largest city: Bellevue)
- Scotts Bluff (largest city: Scottsbluff)
- Sherman (largest city: Gordon)
- Stanton (largest city: Stanton)
- Thayer (largest city: Hebron)
- Thomas (largest city: Thedford)
- Valley (largest city: Ord)
- Washington (largest city: Blair)
- Wheeler (largest city: Bartlett)
- York (largest city: York)

== Aftermath ==
Ricketts later was elected governor of Nebraska in 2014 and 2018. In 2023, he was appointed to fill a vacancy in the other Nebraska senate seat. He won a special election to that seat in 2024, and is the Republican nominee for re-election in 2026.

== See also ==
- 2006 United States Senate elections
