= Nelson Amendment =

The Nelson Amendment is an amendment intended to restrict federal funding of elective abortions in the Senate version of America's Affordable Health Choices Act of 2009.

== History ==
Democratic Senator Ben Nelson said that he would not support a bill that "doesn't make it clear that it does not fund abortion with government money".

Nelson introduced a Senate version of the Stupak–Pitts Amendment and threatened to support a filibuster of the Senate bill if the language was not included.

Nelson later accepted a version that would allow people to use federal subsidies to buy plans that include abortion coverage while requiring them to pay for elective abortion coverage separately, without subsidies. States could exclude plans providing abortion coverage from their respective exchanges.

After criticism from national anti-abortion organizations, Nelson shifted his position and indicated that he would lobby for tighter restrictions on elective abortion funding similar to the Stupak-Pitts Amendment.

Until Scott Brown's election to the Senate in January 2010, the Nelson Amendment was viewed by the pro-choice leadership of the Democratic party as one of the big hurdles in passing legislation, along with other significant issues such as the public option.
