= Capps Amendment =

Proposed Amendment to a US law

The Capps Amendment was a provision sponsored in the House by Rep. Lois Capps and included in America's Affordable Health Choices Act of 2009 (H.R. 3200).

As reported out of committee, it would have prohibited federal funding for abortions except in cases allowed by the Hyde Amendment, and was described, by political commentators and fact-checker PolitiFact.com as well as its supporters, as a compromise which aimed to maintain the status quo for new programs created through the legislation.

The amendment was eventually replaced by the Stupak–Pitts Amendment.
