= Stupak–Pitts Amendment =

Proposed U.S. legislation

The Stupak–Pitts Amendment was a proposed amendment to the Affordable Health Care for America Act of 2010 (AHCAA). It was submitted by Representatives Bart Stupak (Democrat of Michigan) and Joseph R. Pitts (Republican of Pennsylvania). Its stated purpose was to prohibit the use of federal funds "to pay for any abortion or to cover any part of the costs of any health plan that includes coverage of abortion" except in cases of rape, incest or danger to the life of the mother. It was adopted by the House but not included in the Senate's version, the Patient Protection and Affordable Care Act (PPACA). Representatives who support abortion rights said they would oppose AHCAA with the Stupak-Pitts language, and proposed to adopt PPACA. Stupak and several supporters said they would oppose PPACA without the amendment, but withdrew their opposition after President Barack Obama promised an executive order to bar such funding. Anti-abortion groups criticized this action, saying that the executive order would not be effective.

== Introduction of the amendment ==
Under the Hyde Amendment, the federal government was prohibited from paying for abortion services. The AHCAA was to provide a "public option", under which individuals could buy subsidized health insurance from a federal agency, and also to set up health insurance exchanges through which individuals could buy health insurance from private companies, with federal financial assistance. Anti-abortion groups noted that both the public option and the exchanges allowed federal funds to pay for insurance which could pay for abortions, thus creating a loophole in the Hyde Amendment.

The amendment to close this apparent loophole was submitted in late 2009 by Stupak and Pitts. Other prominent supporters of the amendment included Representatives Brad Ellsworth, Marcy Kaptur, Kathy Dahlkemper, Daniel Lipinski and Chris Smith. Its stated purpose was to prohibit the use of federal funds "to pay for any abortion or to cover any part of the costs of any health plan that includes coverage of abortion" except in cases of rape, incest or danger to the life of the mother. This was interpreted by some to mean that the costs of abortions not included in the exceptions might therefore not be covered in the public option or in any exchange's private plans that accepted subsidized customers. The exceptions are similar to those included in the Hyde Amendment. The amendment also specifically allowed individuals to purchase supplementary insurance that covers other abortions.

== Opposition ==
NARAL Pro-Choice America criticized the amendment, stating it could mean that people whose health insurance currently covers abortions will lose that service. Those who voted against the amendment argued that, because premiums of private individuals would pay for the abortions, they were distinguished from situations covered by the Hyde Amendment.

The American Civil Liberties Union joined the opposition to the amendment, saying it "jeopardizes the abortion coverage that millions of women currently have".

According to the Guttmacher Institute, 13% of all abortions in 2001 were directly billed to private insurance companies. Some in the debate used this statistic to argue that relatively few women seemed to use private insurance coverage to pay for abortion services, and therefore that absence of coverage would have minimal impact. The Institute responded that arguments based on the statistic alone misrepresented the situation: it omitted both women who paid for the procedure out of pocket, later seeking reimbursement from their insurance company, and those who had coverage but chose not to use it because they wanted their employer, insurer or primary policyholder (such as their spouse or parent) not to know that they obtained an abortion.

An analysis published by policy researchers at the George Washington University Medical School Department of Health Policy concluded that the Stupak–Pitts Amendment would have the effect of eliminating coverage of medically indicated abortions for all women, not just those receiving subsidies or participating in the exchange. The analysis also said the Amendment's restrictions would hinder the insurance industry's ability to market supplemental coverage for abortions, and impact the current ability of individual states to provide such supplemental coverage to Medicaid recipients. Another issue raised was the possibility of private insurance companies denying coverage for other procedures if a relationship between those procedures and an abortion existed, especially in cases where an abortion was the result of other serious health conditions.

Catholic lay anti-abortion activist Judie Brown of the American Life League criticized the Stupak–Pitts Amendment for being insufficiently anti-abortion. She said without the amendment, AHCAA would not have passed in the House, but the United States Conference of Catholic Bishops' (USCCB) support for the amended bill "gave cover for approximately 40 supposedly pro-life representatives to seemingly support the pro-life cause while also supporting all of the Pelosi bill’s major components." Brown said the bill as passed contained "anti-life" "provisions for abortion, contraception, medical 'care' that allows euthanasia, promiscuity-promoting sex education, 'family planning services' provided by organizations such as Planned Parenthood, contradictory and inconsistent language regarding conscience protection and other loopholes." She added, "USCCB made it possible for Catholic Democrats in the House to pay lip service to Church teaching on abortion while voting for a bill that violates Church teachings in several ways, including abortion."

== Congressional action ==
=== House action ===
The House approved the Stupak–Pitts amendment on November 7, 2009, by a vote of 240–194. Stupak, the lead sponsor, had stated in late September that he wanted a full vote on the House floor on the amendment. After the amendment was adopted, Stupak voted in favor of the amended bill.

Even though the Stupak–Pitts Amendment was part of AHCAA as enacted by the House, its fate remained uncertain in early 2010. In mid-November 2009 it was reported that 40 House Democrats had said they would not support a final bill containing the Amendment's provisions. Subsequently, Stupak said that between 15 and 20 Democrats would not support adoption of the Senate bill because of objections to its abortion provisions, as well as its tax on high-value health insurance plans.

In March 2010, Stupak revealed that he would vote for the Senate legislation without the language of his amendment; this drew criticism from anti-abortion activists.

=== Senate action ===
The Patient Protection and Affordable Care Act, presented by Senate leader Harry Reid, did not include the language of the Stupak–Pitts Amendment. Instead, it contained provisions similar to the Capps Amendment. The failure of the Reid bill to incorporate the additional restrictions included in Stupak–Pitts was criticized by anti-abortion organizations, and Democratic Senator Ben Nelson said he would not support a bill that "doesn't make it clear that it does not fund abortion with government money", resulting in inclusion of the Nelson Amendment in the bill passed by the Senate.

== Public opinion ==
A poll taken on November 10 and 11 by Angus Reid Global Monitor found that 54% of Americans supported "prohibiting the use of federal funding for insurance that covers elective abortions". Among self-identified Democrats, 46% expressed support. The poll results had a 3.1% margin of error.

In a November 12–15 Washington Post – ABC News poll, 61% responded they "support barring coverage for abortions for those receiving public subsidies"; asked whether "with segregated private money used to cover abortion procedures", as provided by the earlier Capps Amendment, 56% said "insurance offered to those using government assistance should be able to include such coverage".

A November 13–15 CNN–Opinion Research Corporation poll found that 60% of the respondents oppose public funding of abortion. When asked whether private and employer-sponsored insurance plans should cover any costs of abortion or whether women should have to pay the entire cost themselves, a 51–45% majority said women should have to pay the full costs themselves. CNN said the 6% difference is within the poll's sampling error.

A poll taken by the Quinnipiac University Polling Institute showed that voters opposed public money in the health care bill to pay for abortions by 72% to 23%.

== Outcome ==
On March 21, 2010, Stupak made a deal with Obama whereby he and his bloc of Democrats would vote for the final bill if Obama signed an executive order barring federal funding of abortion under the bill. The deal resulted in the final bill being passed in the House by a vote of 219–212. The deal was condemned by both advocates and opponents of abortion rights.

== See also ==
- Executive Order 13535
