= Jane Raybould =

American politician

Member of the Nebraska Legislature from the 28th district
- Incumbent
- Assumed office January 4, 2023
- Preceded by: Patty Pansing Brooks

Personal details
- Born: November 1, 1958 (age 67) Lincoln, Nebraska, U.S.
- Party: Democratic
- Spouse: Jose Herrero
- Children: 2
- Education: Creighton University (BA); Georgetown University (MA)
- Website: Campaign website

Jane Michele Raybould is a member of the Nebraska Legislature from Lincoln, Nebraska, in District 28. She is a former member of the Lincoln city council.

Raybould works with her family at their employee-owned grocery business, B&R Stores, as vice chairman and director of buildings and equipment. She oversees capital investments and real estate developments, remodels and construction, and property management.

Raybould served as a Lancaster County commissioner from 2010 to 2014. She was chosen by Democratic gubernatorial nominee Chuck Hassebrook to be his running mate as lieutenant governor in the 2014 Nebraska gubernatorial election, ultimately losing to Governor Pete Ricketts and his running mate Mike Foley. Raybould ran unsuccessfully for the United States Senate in 2018 as the Democratic nominee against incumbent Senator Deb Fischer.

== Electoral history ==
Nebraska's 28th Legislative District Election, 2022
Primary election
Party	Candidate	Votes	%
Democratic	Jane Raybould	4,919	64.49
Republican	Roy Christensen	2,708	35.51
Total votes		7,627	100.00
General election
Democratic	Jane Raybould	7,879	66.46
Republican	Roy Christensen	3,977	33.54
Total votes		11,856	100.00
Democratic hold			

United States Senate election in Nebraska, 2018
Party	Candidate	Votes	%	±%
Republican	Deb Fischer (incumbent)	403,151	57.69%	−0.08%
Democratic	Jane Raybould	269,917	38.62%	−3.61%
Libertarian	Jim Schultz	25,349	3.63%	N/A
Write-in		466	0.07%	N/A
Total votes		698,883	100%	N/A
Republican hold				

Party political offices
Preceded by Anne Boyle	Democratic nominee for Lieutenant Governor of Nebraska; 2014	Succeeded by Lynne Walz
Preceded by Bob Kerrey	Democratic nominee for U.S. Senator from Nebraska (Class 1); 2018	Most recent
Nebraska Legislature
Preceded by Patty Pansing Brooks	Member of the Nebraska Legislature from the 28th district 2023–present	Incumbent
