= Don Stenberg =

American lawyer and politician

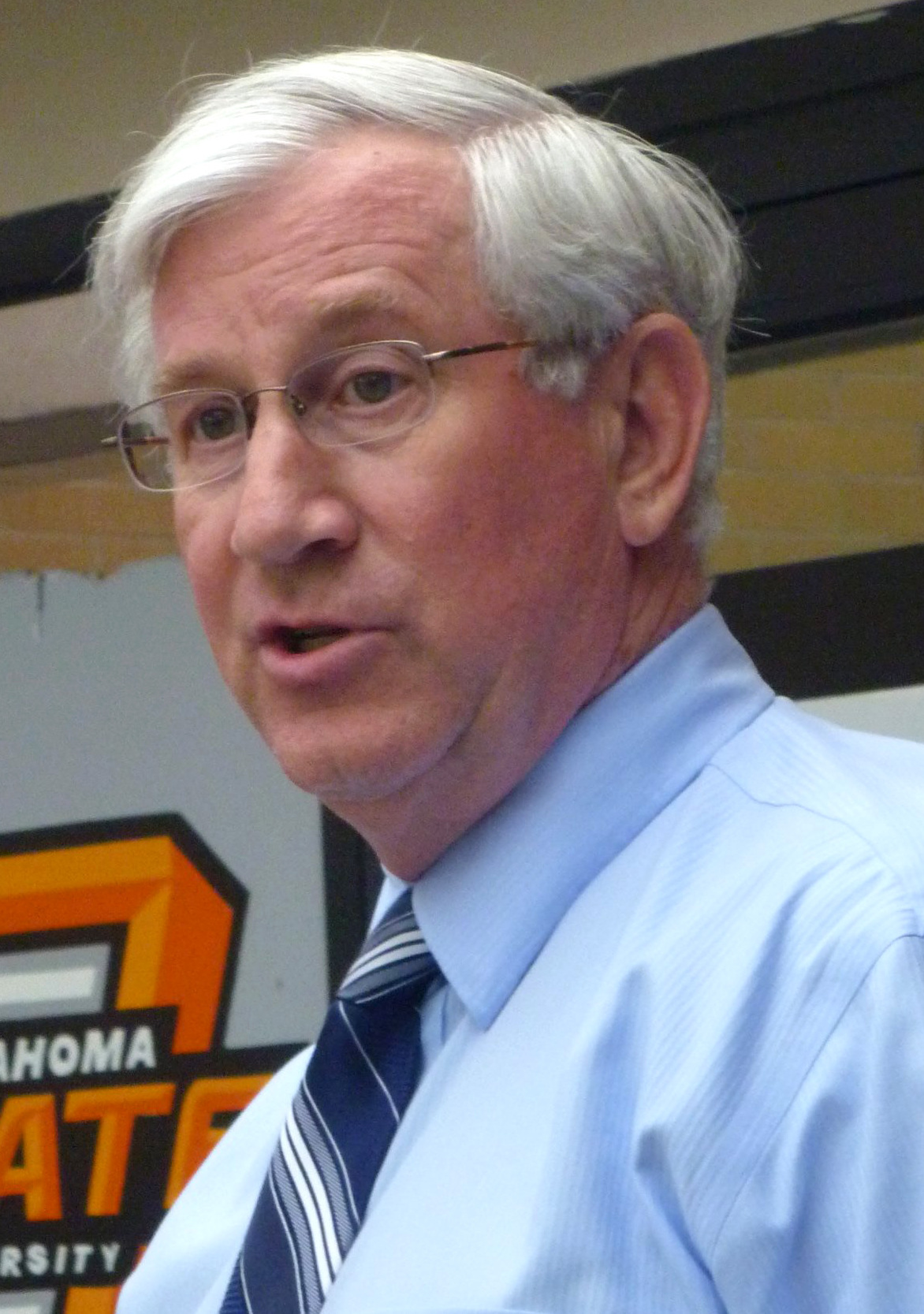
- Stenberg in 2011

41st Treasurer of Nebraska
- In office January 6, 2011 – January 9, 2019
- Governor: Dave Heineman; Pete Ricketts
- Preceded by: Shane Osborn
- Succeeded by: John Murante

30th Attorney General of Nebraska
- In office January 9, 1991 – January 9, 2003
- Governor: Ben Nelson; Mike Johanns
- Preceded by: Robert Spire
- Succeeded by: Jon Bruning

Personal details
- Born: September 20, 1948 (age 77) Tekamah, Nebraska, U.S.
- Party: Republican
- Spouse: Sue Hoegemeyer
- Education: University of Nebraska–Lincoln (BA); Harvard University (JD, MBA)
- Website: Campaign website

Don Stenberg (born September 30, 1948) is an American lawyer and politician who served as the 31st attorney general of Nebraska from 1991 to 2003 and 43rd treasurer of Nebraska from 2011 to 2019. A member of the Republican Party, he previously was legal counsel to Governor Charles Thone from 1979 to 1983.

He unsuccessfully ran for Lieutenant Governor of Nebraska in 1978; Attorney General of Nebraska in 1986; and the United States Senate in 1996, 2000, 2006, and 2012.

== Early life, education, and law career ==
Stenberg was born and raised in Tekamah, Nebraska. To pay for college, he detasseled corn, hauled bales, mowed lawns, and life guarded at the local swimming pool. After graduating from University of Nebraska–Lincoln (1970), Harvard Law School (1974), and Harvard Business School (1974) he practiced law in Lincoln.

== Early political career (1978–1989) ==
=== 1978 run for lieutenant governor ===
In 1978, Stenberg ran for Lieutenant Governor of Nebraska, coming in fourth in the Republican primary with just 13% of the vote. Roland Luedtke won the primary with a plurality of 31%.

=== Thone administration ===
In 1979, he was named as legal counsel to Republican governor of Nebraska Charles Thone. Stenberg has also served as director of the Governor's Policy Research Office, assistant to the governor, and director of the Department of Administrative Services.

=== 1986 run for attorney general ===
He first ran for Nebraska Attorney General in 1986, but lost in the Republican primary to incumbent Robert Spire 53%–47%.

== State attorney general (1991–2003) ==
=== Elections ===
In 1990, he ran for attorney general again. In the Republican primary, he won with a plurality of 38%. In the general election, he defeated Democrat Gene Crump 54%–46%. He won re-election in 1994 (67%) and 1998 (68%).

=== Tenure ===
Stenberg was the named defendant in the noted Supreme Court abortion case, Stenberg v. Carhart 530 U.S. 914 (2000).

=== 1996 U.S. Senate election ===
Stenberg first ran for the U.S. Senate in 1996 to succeed retiring Democratic U.S. Senator J. James Exon. Initially seen as the frontrunner, he was defeated by business executive Chuck Hagel 62%–38%. Hagel went on to win an upset against Democratic Governor Ben Nelson.

=== 2000 U.S. Senate election ===
After being re-elected Attorney General in 1998, Stenberg again ran for the U.S. Senate in 2000 to succeed retiring Democratic U.S. Senator Bob Kerrey. He won the six candidate primary with 50% of the vote. In one of the closest elections in Nebraska history, Nelson defeated Stenberg 51%–49%, even as Republican presidential nominee George W. Bush won the state with 62%.

== Post-Attorney General career (2003–present) ==
=== Private sector ===
Stenberg left office as attorney general in 2003 and returned to work in the private sector as of counsel at Erickson and Sederstrom, the same firm where his former boss, Charles Thone, is a partner.

=== 2006 U.S. Senate election ===
In 2006, Stenberg launched his third bid for the U.S. Senate. Once again, an early frontrunner, he was defeated by former Ameritrade chief operating officer Pete Ricketts 48%–38%. Ricketts went on to lose to incumbent U.S. Senator Nelson.

=== State Treasurer ===
In 2010, Stenberg ran for Nebraska State Treasurer to succeed retiring Shane Osborn. He won the primary over state Senator Tony Fulton 52%–28% and won the general election with 73% of the vote.

=== 2012 U.S. Senate election ===
In 2011, he announced his intention to run for the U.S. Senate a fourth time.

After receiving endorsements from Club for Growth and Freedomworks, Stenberg split the Tea Party vote with attorney general Jon Brunning. Stenberg came in third place, taking 18.8% of the vote. The nomination went to State senator Deb Fischer.

=== 2014 election ===
Following the withdrawal of the two leading candidates for the Republican nomination for Governor, Stenberg said that he would consider "what is the best way to serve the state of Nebraska". He has said that it was "unlikely, but possible" that he would run for governor. He also considered running for the open U.S. Senate seat, but decided instead to run for re-election to a second term as Treasurer.

== Personal life ==
He is married to Sue Hoegemeyer of Hooper, Nebraska. They have been married 39 years and have four children.

== Electoral history ==
Nebraska Lieutenant Governor Republican Primary Election, 1978
Party	Candidate	Votes	%
Republican	Roland Luedtke	53,762	30.68
Republican	Dennis Rasmussen	50,627	28.89
Republican	Rosemary Mara Skrupe	29,532	16.85
Republican	Don Stenberg	22,592	12.89
Republican	Herbert Duis	18,736	10.69

Nebraska Attorney General Republican Primary Election, 1986
Party	Candidate	Votes	%
Republican	Robert Spike	99,578	55.41
Republican	Don Stenberg	80,130	44.59

Nebraska Attorney General Republican Primary Election, 1990
Party	Candidate	Votes	%
Republican	Don Stenberg	72,177	38.28
Republican	Mike Heavican	69,478	36.85
Republican	John DeCamp	46,880	24.87

Nebraska Attorney General Election, 1990
Party	Candidate	Votes	%
Republican	Don Stenberg	297,815	53.68
Democratic	Gene Crump	256,686	46.26
Write-ins	Write-ins	335	0.06

Nebraska Attorney General Election, 1994
Party	Candidate	Votes	%
Republican	Don Stenberg (inc.)	367,396	67.48
Democratic	Steve Scherr	176,594	32.44
Write-ins	Write-ins	463	0.09

Nebraska U.S. Senate Republican Primary Election, 1996
Party	Candidate	Votes	%
Republican	Chuck Hagel	112,953	56.22
Republican	Don Stenberg	87,974	43.78

Nebraska Attorney General Election, 1998
Party	Candidate	Votes	%
Republican	Don Stenberg (inc.)	353,939	68.07
Democratic	Pat Knapp	151,054	29.05
Libertarian	Andrew Sullivan	14,693	2.83
Write-ins	Write-ins	253	0.05

Nebraska U.S. Senate Republican Primary Election, 2000
Party	Candidate	Votes	%
Republican	Don Stenberg	91,981	50.22
Republican	Scott Moore	39,493	21.56
Republican	David Hergert	31,560	17.23
Republican	George Grogan	7,943	4.34
Republican	John DeCamp	7,096	3.87
Republican	Elliott Rustad	5,074	2.77

Nebraska U.S. Senate Election, 2000
Party	Candidate	Votes	%
Democratic	Ben Nelson	353,093	51.00
Republican	Don Stenberg	337,977	48.82
Write-ins	Write-ins	1,280	0.18

Nebraska U.S. Senate Republican Primary Election, 2006
Party	Candidate	Votes	%
Republican	Pete Ricketts	129,643	48.02
Republican	Don Stenberg	96,496	35.75
Republican	David Kramer	43,815	16.23

Nebraska Treasurer Republican Primary Election, 2010
Party	Candidate	Votes	%
Republican	Don Stenberg	83,461	51.77
Republican	Tony Fulton	44,771	27.77
Republican	Tom Nesbitt	32,979	20.46

Nebraska Treasurer Election, 2010
Party	Candidate	Votes	%
Republican	Don Stenberg	345,661	72.94
Democratic	Mark Stoj	128,231	27.06

Nebraska U.S. Senate Republican Primary Election, 2012
Party	Candidate	Votes	%
Republican	Deb Fischer	79,941	40.99
Republican	Jon Bruning	70,067	35.92
Republican	Don Stenberg	36,727	18.83
Republican	Pat Flynn	5,413	2.78
Republican	Spencer Zimmerman	1,601	0.82
Republican	Sharyn Elander	1,294	0.66

Nebraska Treasurer Republican Primary Election, 2014
Party	Candidate	Votes	%
Republican	Don Stenberg (inc.)	172,861	84.97
Republican	Christopher Costello	30,566	15.03

Nebraska Treasurer Election, 2014
Party	Candidate	Votes	%
Republican	Don Stenberg (inc.)	357,474	68.14
Democratic	Michael O'Hara	139,101	26.52
Libertarian	Michael Knebel	28,009	5.34

Legal offices
Preceded by Robert Spire	Attorney General of Nebraska; 1991–2003	Succeeded by Jon Bruning
Party political offices
Preceded by Robert Spire	Republican nominee for Nebraska Attorney General; 1990, 1994, 1998	Succeeded by Jon Bruning
Preceded by Jan Stoney	Republican nominee for U.S. Senator from Nebraska (Class 1); 2000	Succeeded by Pete Ricketts
Preceded by Shane Osborn	Republican nominee for Nebraska State Treasurer; 2010, 2014	Succeeded by John Murante
Political offices
Preceded by Shane Osborn	Treasurer of Nebraska; 2011–2019	Succeeded by John Murante
