= 2000 United States Senate election in Nebraska =

United states senate election

- November 7, 2000
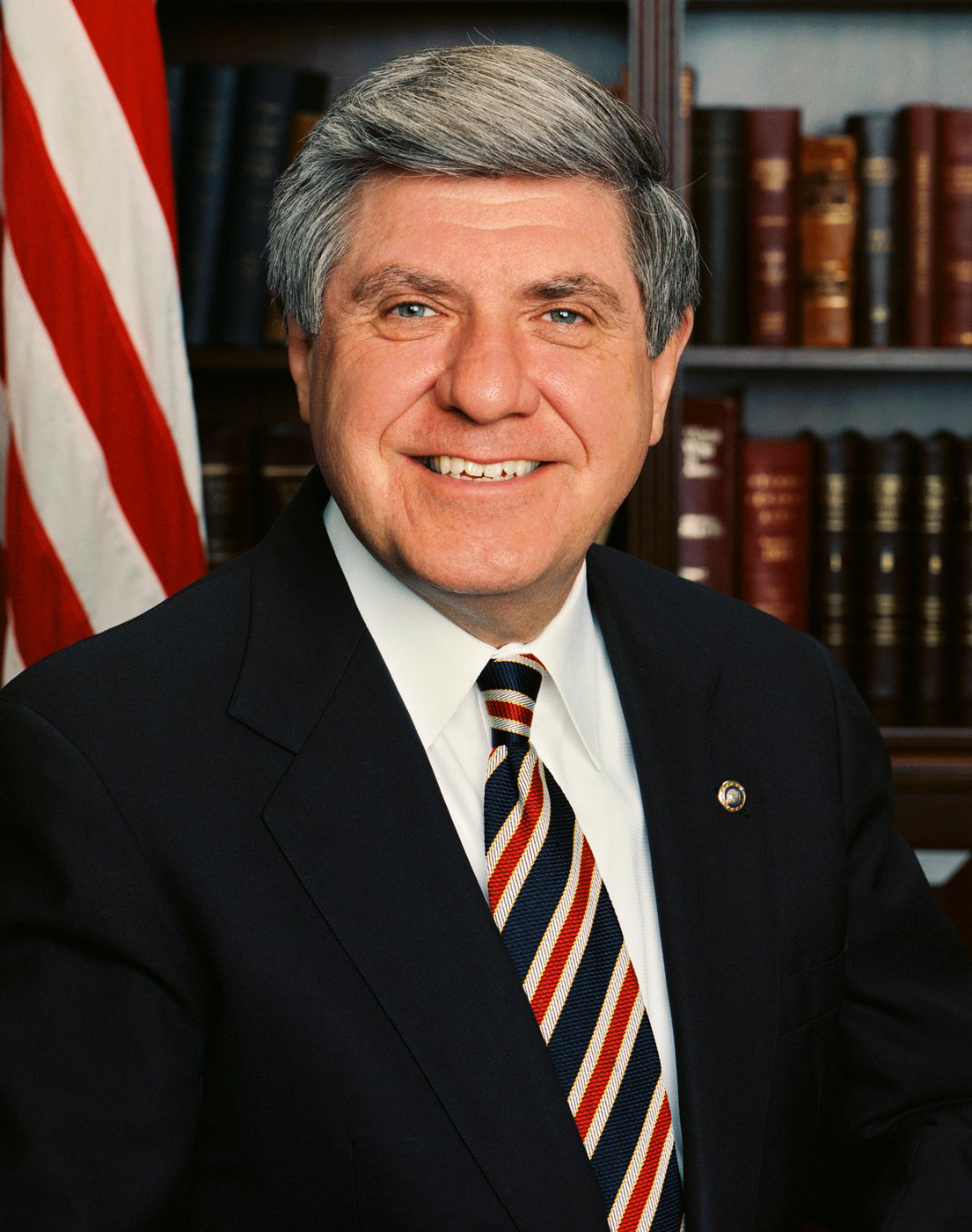

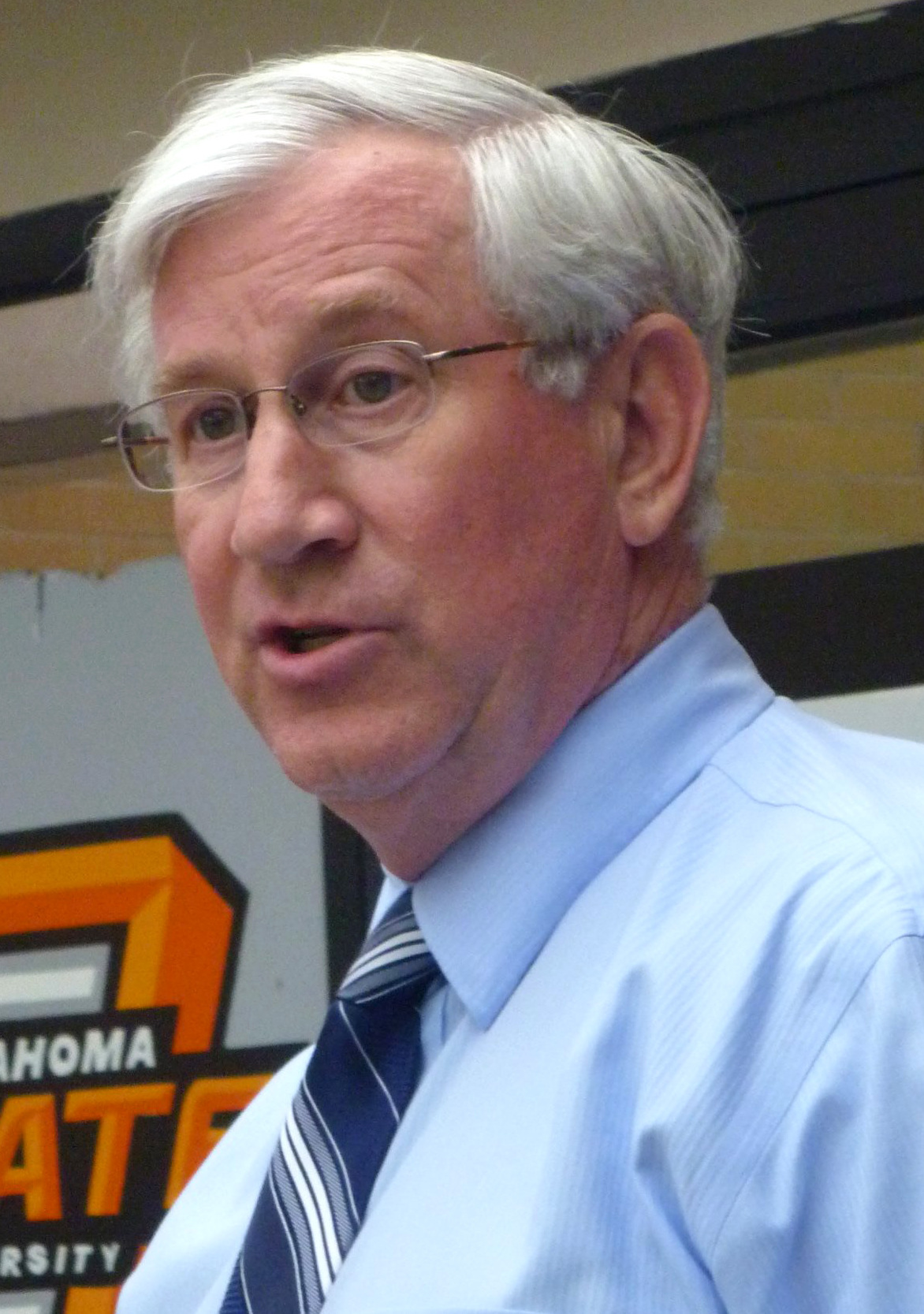
Nominee	Ben Nelson	Don Stenberg
Party	Democratic	Republican
Popular vote	353,093	337,977
Percentage	51.00%	48.82%
- County results Nelson: 50–60% 60–70% Stenberg: 50–60% 60–70% 70–80%
U.S. senator before election
Bob Kerrey
Democratic
Elected U.S. Senator
Ben Nelson
Democratic

The 2000 United States Senate election in Nebraska was held on November 7, 2000. Democratic incumbent Bob Kerrey declined to run for a third term in office. Former governor Ben Nelson won the open seat over Don Stenberg.

Nelson won despite Republican presidential nominee George W. Bush carrying the state in a landslide in the concurrent presidential election. As of 2026, this is the last time Nebraska voted for a Senate candidate and a presidential candidate of different political parties.

== Democratic primary ==
=== Candidates ===
- Ben Nelson, former governor of Nebraska and 1996 Senate nominee
- Al Hamburg, perennial candidate

=== Results ===
Democratic primary results
Party	Candidate	Votes	%
Democratic	Ben Nelson	105,661	92.12%
Democratic	Al Hamburg	8,482	7.39%
Democratic	Write-ins	558	0.49%
Total votes		114,701	100.00%

== Republican primary ==
=== Candidates ===
- John DeCamp, former state senator from Neligh
- George Grogan
- David Hergert
- Scott Moore, secretary of state of Nebraska
- Elliott Rustad
- Don Stenberg, Nebraska attorney general

=== Results ===
Republican primary results
Party	Candidate	Votes	%
Republican	Don Stenberg	94,394	49.99%
Republican	Scott Moore	41,120	21.77%
Republican	David Hergert	32,228	17.07%
Republican	George Grogan	8,293	4.39%
Republican	John DeCamp	7,469	3.96%
Republican	Elliott Rustad	5,317	2.82%
Republican	Write-ins	21	0.01%
Total votes		188,842	100.00%

== General election ==
=== Candidates ===
- Ben Nelson, former governor of Nebraska and 1996 Senate nominee (Democratic)
- Don Stenberg, Nebraska attorney general (Republican)

=== Debates ===
- Complete video of debate, September 21, 2000

=== Polling ===
Poll source	Date(s)	Sample size	Margin of error	Don Stenberg (R)	Ben Nelson (D)	Other / undecided (Note: Calculated by taking the difference of 100% and all other candidates combined.)
Harris Insights & Analytics	November 3, 2000	1,477	—	46%	53%	1%
RKM Research and Communications Inc.	October 26, 2000	1,007 (RV)	—	37%	49%	14%

=== Results ===
General election results
Party	Candidate	Votes	%	±%
Democratic	Ben Nelson	353,093	51.00%	−3.78%
Republican	Don Stenberg	337,977	48.82%	+3.81%
Write-in		1,280	0.18%	—
Majority		15,116	2.18%	−7.60%
Total votes		692,350	100.00%	
Democratic hold				

==== Counties that flipped from Democratic to Republican ====
- Burt (largest village: Tekamah)
- Box Butte (largest city: Alliance)
- Butler (largest city: David City)
- Clay (largest city: Sutton)
- Colfax (largest city: Schuyler)
- Furnas (largest city: Cambridge)
- Gosper (largest city: Elwood)
- Harlan (largest city: Alma)
- Hitchcock (largest city: Culbertson)
- Knox (largest city: Creighton)
- Kearney (largest city: Minden)
- Merrick (largest city: Central City)
- Nemaha (largest city: Auburn)
- Nance (largest city: Fullerton)
- Boone (largest city: Albion)
- Polk (largest city: Stromsburg)
- Richardson (largest city: Falls City)
- Sarpy (largest city: Bellevue)
- Thayer (largest city: Hebron)
- Washington (largest city: Blair)
- Franklin (largest city: Franklin)

==== Counties that flipped from Republican to Democratic ====
- Lincoln (largest city: North Platte)

== See also ==
- 2000 United States Senate elections
