= Maxine Moul =

American politician (born 1947)

Maxine B. Moul
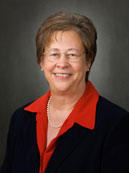

34th Lieutenant Governor of Nebraska
- In office January 9, 1991 – October 6, 1993
- Governor: Ben Nelson
- Preceded by: William E. Nichol
- Succeeded by: Kim Robak

Personal details
- Born: Maxine Burnett; January 26, 1947 (age 79) Oakland, Nebraska, U.S.
- Party: Democratic

Maxine Burnett Moul (born January 26, 1947) is an American politician who served as the 34th lieutenant governor of Nebraska from 1991 to 1993, the first woman to hold that position in the state. Moul is a member of the Democratic Party.

== Life and politics ==
Moul was raised in Burt County, Nebraska. She graduated from Oakland High School and received her Bachelor's degree in journalism from the University of Nebraska–Lincoln in 1969.

Growing up, she lived in a rural neighborhood northeast of Oakland, Nebraska and worked as a babysitter and babysat former state senator Brett Lindstrom's father, Dan Lindstrom, and uncles.

She later worked as a writer and photographer for the Sioux City Journal in Sioux City from 1969 to 1971. She married Francis Moul in 1972 with whom she purchased the Syracuse Journal-Democrat. The Mouls eventually expanded the newspaper into Maverick Media, a larger newspaper and magazine publishing company.

Moul served as the lieutenant governor of Nebraska from 1991 to 1993, with governor Ben Nelson. She resigned in 1993 to become the director of the Nebraska Department of Economic Development, post she held until 1999. From 2001 to 2003 she served as the president of the Nebraska Community Foundation, a charitable organization providing financial management, strategic development, and training services to Nebraska communities and organizations. In 2006, she ran for Congress for Nebraska's 1st congressional district and was defeated by Republican incumbent Jeff Fortenberry by a margin of 18 percentage points. In 2009 she was appointed as U.S. Department of Agriculture's Rural Development Director for Nebraska.

Moul, a life-long Democrat, briefly registered as Republican in 2022 in order to vote in the closed, "hotly-contested" 2022 Republican gubernatorial primaries for Brett Lindstrom, citing her familiarity with his father as well as Lindstrom's "more moderate" politics and "positive" advertising compared to fellow Republican candidates Charles Herbster and Jim Pillen.

== See also ==
- List of female lieutenant governors in the United States

Party political offices
| Preceded by Donald McGinley | Democratic nominee for Lieutenant Governor of Nebraska; 1990 | Succeeded by Kim Robak |
