= 1996 United States Senate election in Nebraska =

- November 5, 1996
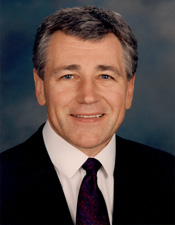

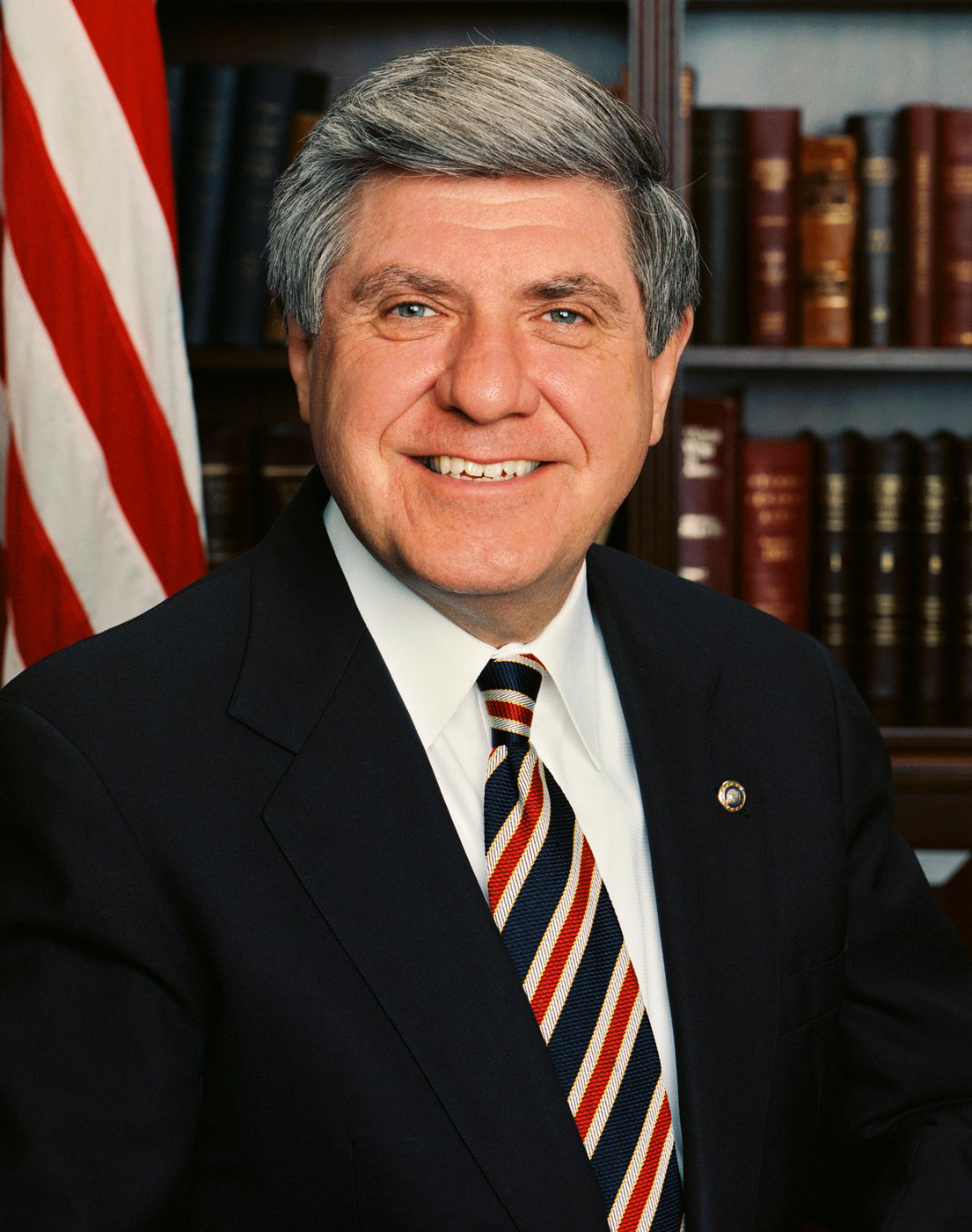
Nominee	Chuck Hagel	Ben Nelson
Party	Republican	Democratic
Popular vote	379,933	281,904
Percentage	56.14%	41.65%
- County results Hagel: 50–60% 60–70% 70–80% 80–90% Nelson: 40–50% 50–60%
U.S. senator before election
J. James Exon
Democratic
Elected U.S. Senator
Chuck Hagel
Republican

The 1996 United States Senate election in Nebraska was held on November 5, 1996. Incumbent Democratic U.S. Senator J. James Exon decided to retire instead of seeking a fourth term. Republican nominee Chuck Hagel won the open seat by 14 points, defeating incumbent Democratic governor Ben Nelson, who later held Nebraska’s other Senate seat from 2001 to 2013, serving alongside Hagel until he retired from the Senate in 2009.

As of 2026, this is the last time an incumbent governor failed to hold a Senate seat for his party. This was also the first time since Carl Curtis was elected to his final term in 1972 that a Republican was elected to either of Nebraska's Senate seats. (Note: David Karnes was appointed to the Senate seat left vacant following the 1987 death of Democratic Senator Ed Zorinsky but was defeated in his bid for a full term by Democratic candidate and former Governor Bob Kerrey.)

== Democratic primary ==
=== Candidates ===
- Ben Nelson, governor of Nebraska

=== Results ===
Democratic primary results
Party	Candidate	Votes	%
Democratic	Ben Nelson	93,140	96.97%
Democratic	Write-ins	2,912	3.03%
Total votes		96,052	100.00%

== Republican primary ==
=== Candidates ===
- Chuck Hagel, businessman
- Don Stenberg, Attorney General of Nebraska

=== Results ===
Republican primary results
Party	Candidate	Votes	%
Republican	Chuck Hagel	112,953	62.24%
Republican	Don Stenberg	67,974	37.46%
Republican	Write-ins	544	0.30%
Total votes		181,471	100.00%

== Libertarian primary ==
=== Results ===
Libertarian primary results
Party	Candidate	Votes	%
Libertarian	Chuck Hagel (write-in)	14	23.33%
Libertarian	John DeCamp (write-in)	11	18.33%
Libertarian	Write-ins	35	58.33%
Total votes		60	100.00%

=== Nomination ===
No candidates filed for the Libertarian Party's nomination, but a primary election was still held, and 60 write-in votes were cast. Of those, 14 votes were cast for Republican Chuck Hagel and 11 for former State Senator John DeCamp. The Nebraska Board of State Canvassers voted 3-2 to certify Hagel as the nominee, but Hagel ultimately declined the nomination, which then went to DeCamp, who accepted it. Though the Nebraska Republican Party filed a lawsuit seeking to block DeCamp's nomination, the lawsuit was dismissed by a state trial court judge and DeCamp was placed on the ballot.

== General election ==
=== Candidates ===
- John DeCamp (Libertarian), former state senator
- Bill Dunn (Natural Law)
- Chuck Hagel (Republican), businessman
- Ben Nelson (Democratic), governor of Nebraska

=== Results ===
1996 United States Senate election in Nebraska
Party	Candidate	Votes	%	±%
Republican	Chuck Hagel	379,933	56.14%	+15.21%
Democratic	Ben Nelson	281,904	41.65%	−17.25%
Libertarian	John DeCamp	9,483	1.40%	
Natural Law	Bill Dunn	4,806	0.71%	
Write-in		663	0.10%	—
Majority		98,029	14.48%	−3.49%
Total votes		676,958	100.00%	
Republican gain from Democratic				

== See also ==
- 1996 United States Senate elections
