= Ben Nelson =

American attorney and politician (born 1941)

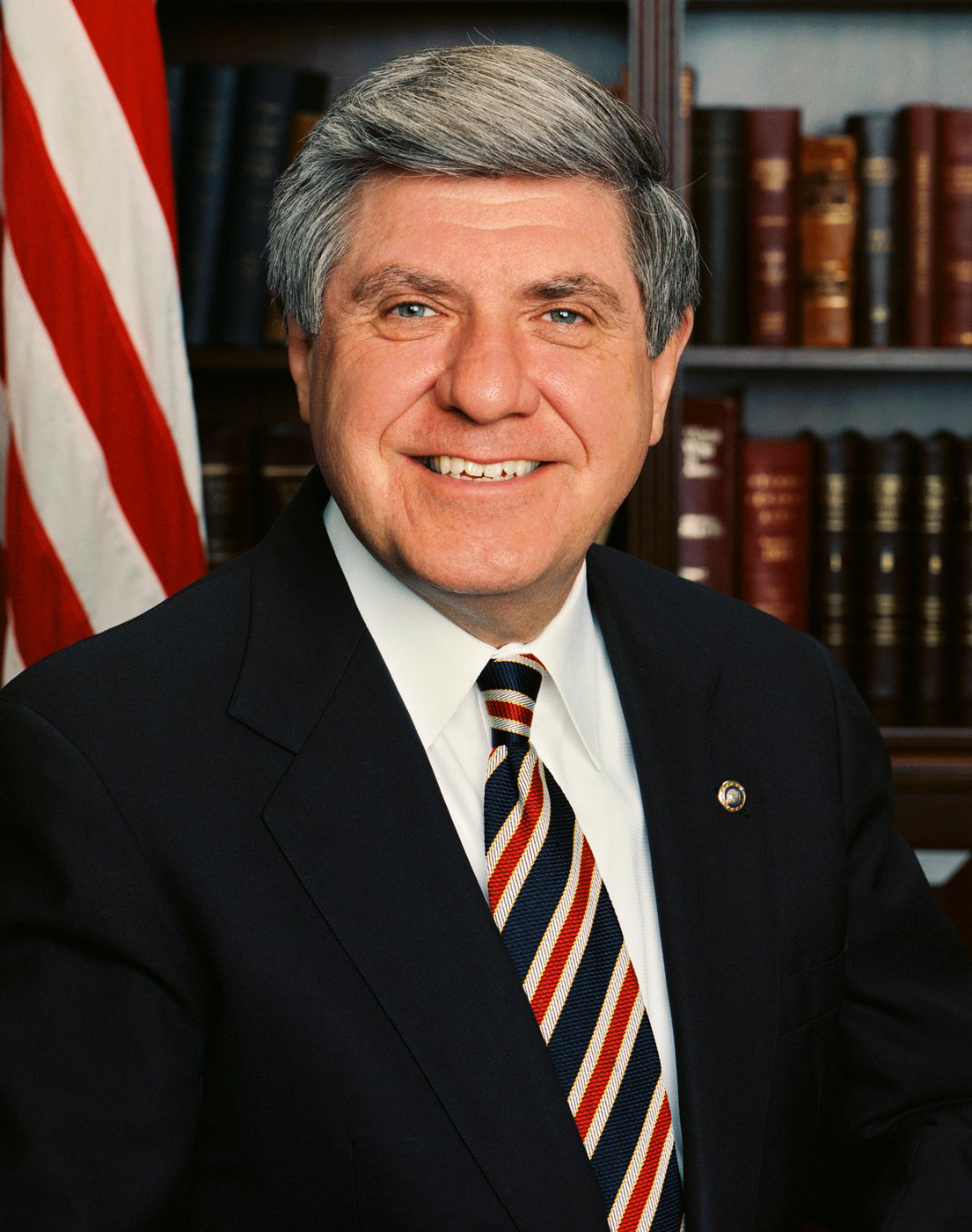
- Official portrait, c. 2005

United States Senator from Nebraska
- In office January 3, 2001 – January 3, 2013
- Preceded by: Bob Kerrey
- Succeeded by: Deb Fischer

37th Governor of Nebraska
- In office January 9, 1991 – January 7, 1999
- Lieutenant: Maxine Moul; Kim Robak
- Preceded by: Kay Orr
- Succeeded by: Mike Johanns

Director of the Nebraska Department of Insurance
- In office 1975–1976
- Governor: J. James Exon
- Preceded by: James Jackson
- Succeeded by: Berri Balka

Personal details
- Born: Earl Benjamin Nelson; May 17, 1941 (age 85) McCook, Nebraska, U.S.
- Party: Democratic
- Spouse: Diane Nelson
- Children: 4 (1 deceased)
- Education: University of Nebraska (BA, MA, JD)
- Ben Nelson's voice Ben Nelson questioning witnesses at a Senate Armed Services Committee hearing on military operations and strategy in Iraq. Recorded September 29, 2005

Earl Benjamin Nelson (born May 17, 1941) is an American politician, attorney, and businessman who served as a United States senator from Nebraska from 2001 to 2013. A member of the Democratic Party, he previously served as the 37th governor of Nebraska from 1991 to 1999. As of 2026, he is the last Democrat to have won or held statewide office in Nebraska.

Nelson was an insurance executive before he entered politics. His first run for office was in 1990, when he narrowly defeated incumbent Republican governor Kay Orr. He was reelected by a landslide in 1994. He ran for an open U.S. Senate seat in 1996, losing in an upset to Republican Chuck Hagel. He was elected to Nebraska's other Senate seat in 2000, and reelected in 2006. He did not run for a third term in 2012, and was succeeded by Republican Deb Fischer.

Nelson was the most conservative Democrat during his time in the U.S. Senate, frequently voting against his party.

== Early life, education, and early career ==
Earl Benjamin Nelson was born on May 17, 1941, in McCook, in southwestern Nebraska. He is the only child of Birdella and Benjamin Earl Nelson. He is an Eagle Scout.

He earned a Bachelor of Arts in 1963, a Master's degree in 1965, and a Juris Doctor in 1970—all from the University of Nebraska–Lincoln.

After graduating from law school, Nelson landed a job as assistant general counsel for Central National Insurance Group of Omaha. After several years in the business, in 1975 the governor appointed him state insurance director. After the administration changed, he returned to work for Central National Insurance as an executive vice president and eventually president.

== Political career ==
Nelson became involved in state politics, joining the Democratic Party. In 1986, he served as state chairman of Democrat Helen Boosalis's gubernatorial campaign. She was mayor of Lincoln, Nebraska. Boosalis was defeated by state treasurer Republican Kay Orr, 53% to 47%.

=== Governor of Nebraska (1991-1999) ===
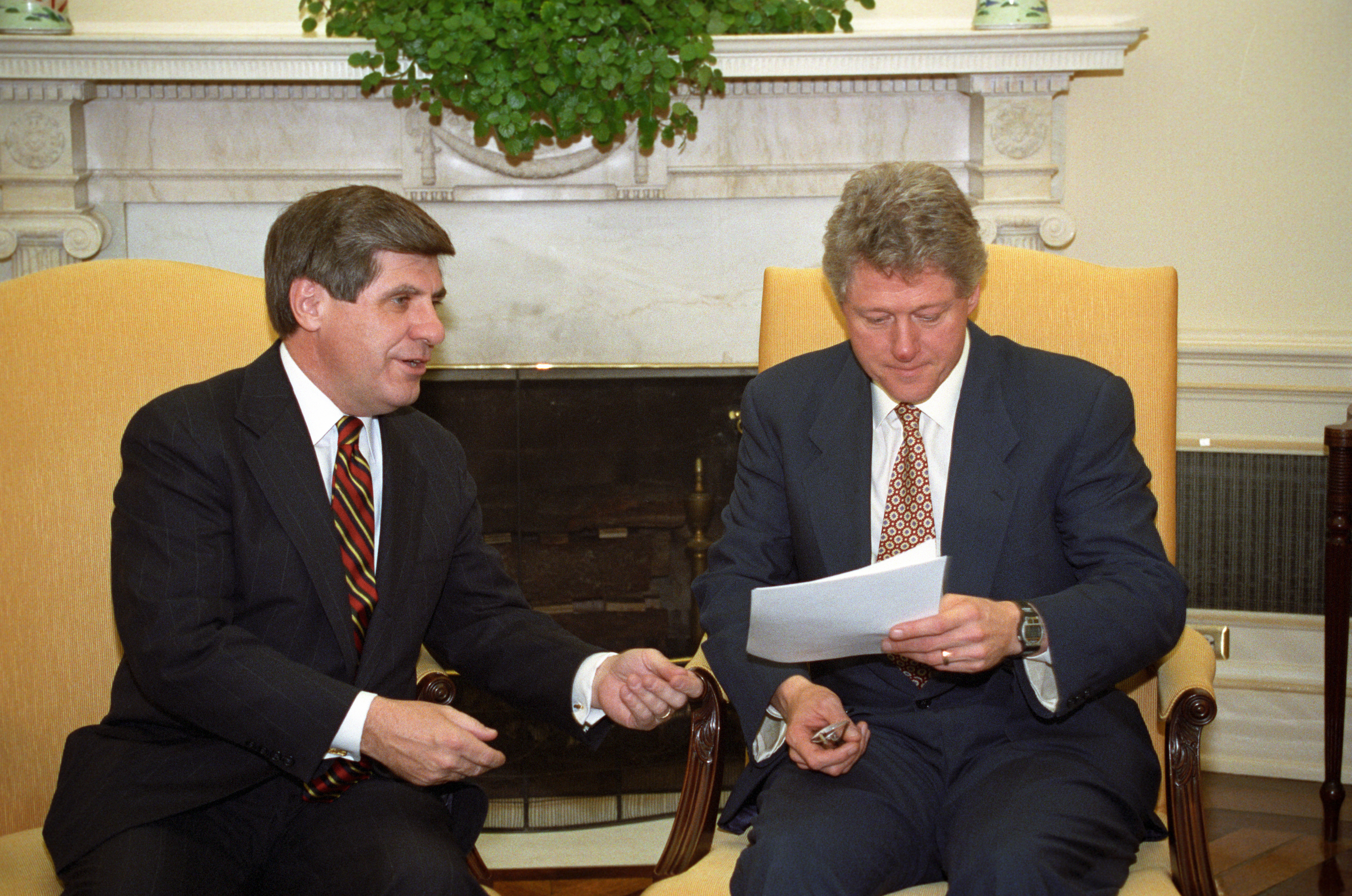
Nelson with President Bill Clinton in 1993

Nelson first ran for electoral office in 1990, defeating first-term Republican incumbent Orr by 4,030 votes out of over 586,000 cast. He was reelected in 1994 with 73% of the vote, the largest margin of victory for a governor in half a century, despite the national Republican gains that year.

During his tenure, he introduced legislation to cut crime through the Safe Streets Act and Juvenile Crime Bill, advocated for low-income families through the Kids Connection health care system, and enacted welfare reforms. He also cut taxes for over 400,000 middle-income families.

As governor, Nelson took some conservative stances on issues in right-leaning Nebraska. He pushed welfare reform before it was done at a national level and opposed President Bill Clinton's efforts on health care.

During the 1990 campaign, Nelson attacked Orr's support for a proposed low-level nuclear waste dump in the state. During his tenure, the Nebraska State Department of Environmental Quality denied the dump's application for an operating license, prompting a lawsuit that Nebraska settled for $145 million.

Nelson ran for a seat in the U.S. Senate in 1996 when fellow Democrat Jim Exon retired. He was defeated by Republican businessman and Vietnam veteran Chuck Hagel in an upset.

In 1998, Nelson was ineligible to run for re-election because of Nebraska's term-limits law. He was succeeded as governor by Mike Johanns, the Republican mayor of Lincoln. As of 2026, Nelson is the last Democrat to serve as governor of Nebraska.

=== U.S. Senator (2001-2013) ===
==== 2000 election ====
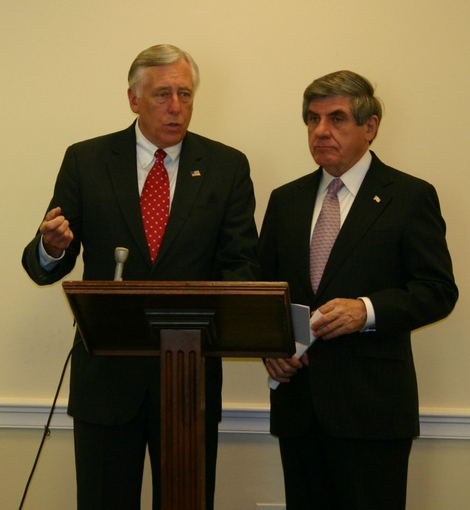
Senator Ben Nelson (right) with House Majority Leader Steny Hoyer (D-MD)

Nelson was nominated by the Democrats for the Senate in the 2000 election after his fellow Democrat, incumbent Bob Kerrey, announced his retirement. His opponent was Attorney General Don Stenberg. Nelson won the election with 51% of the vote after a campaign in which he spent 50% more ($1,004,985) than Stenberg. Despite initially pledging to work together, Nelson and his fellow colleague Hagel had a somewhat frosty relationship.

==== 2006 election ====
Election results by county for Nelson's 2006 re-election bid

Nelson was thought to be in danger of losing his seat in 2006, as it was thought his successor as governor, Mike Johanns, was almost certain to run against him; that speculation ended when Johanns was appointed U.S. Secretary of Agriculture. With Johanns' move to Washington, few high-profile Republicans stepped up to run against Nelson, as the state party focused its attention on the governor's race. The Republican nomination was won by Pete Ricketts, a former TD Ameritrade executive.

In the general election, Nelson was endorsed by the National Rifle Association of America, Nebraska Right to Life (National Right to Life's state affiliate), Nebraskans United for Life, the U.S. Chamber of Commerce, the National Federation of Independent Business, Nebraska Farmers Union PAC, National Farmers Union PAC, the Veterans of Foreign Wars PAC, the Business-Industry Political Action Committee, and the Omaha Police Union, all conservative-leaning groups.

Nelson defeated Ricketts 64%-36%, the biggest victory margin for a Democratic Senate candidate in Nebraska since Edward Zorinsky won 66% of the vote in 1982. In doing so, he received the votes of 42% of Republicans and 73% of Independents on top of 96% of those from his own party. He also won all but 13 counties in the western part of the state, a surprising feat in normally heavily Republican Nebraska.

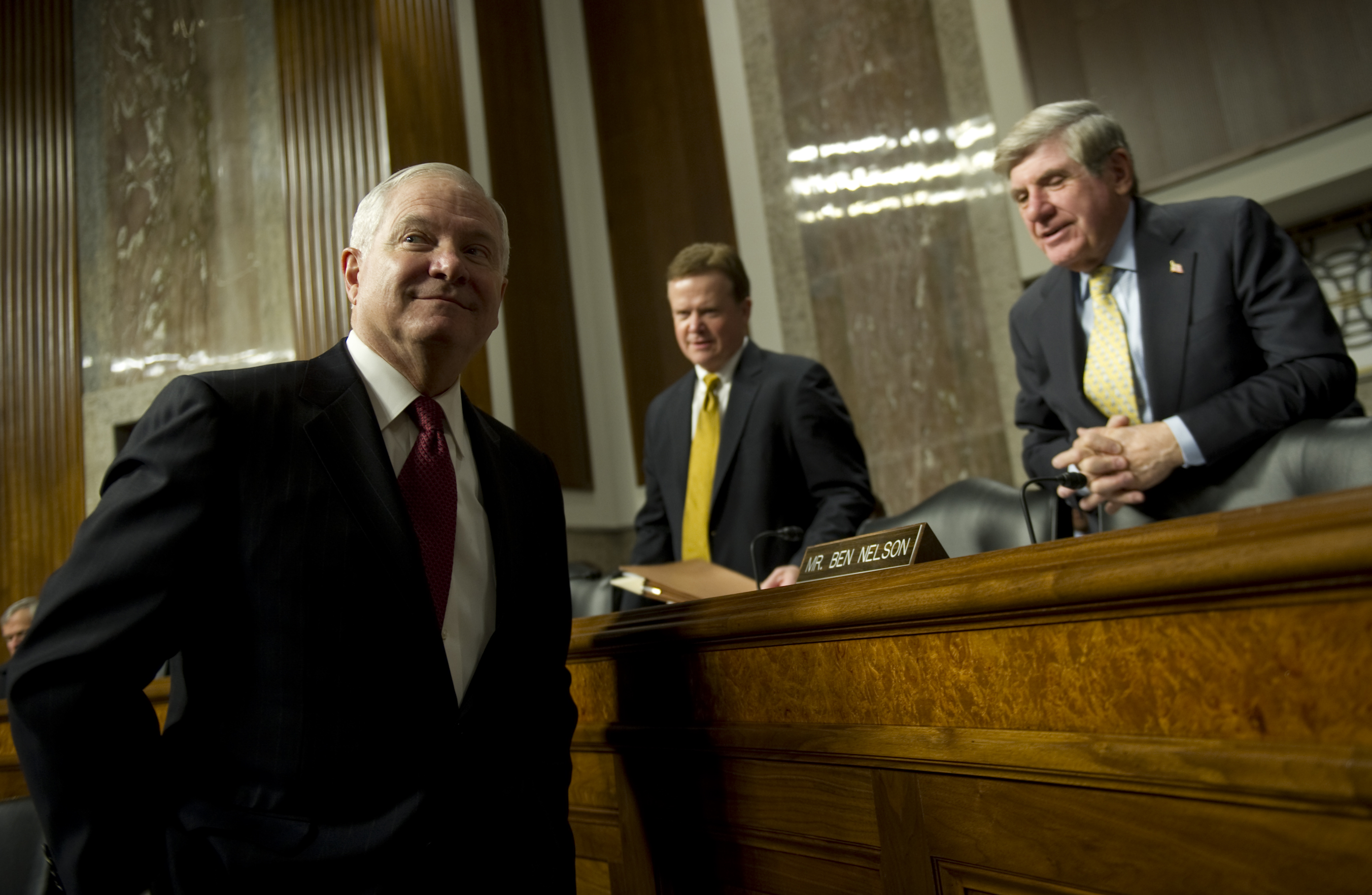
Defense Secretary Robert Gates and Senators Ben Nelson and Jim Webb prior to a hearing before the Senate Armed Services Committee on the START Treaty.

== Political positions ==
=== Abortion ===
Nelson is anti-abortion. In the 2006 election, he was endorsed by Nebraska Right to Life and Nebraskans United for Life. He lost Nebraska Right to Life's support after voting for the Senate version of health-care legislation, the Affordable Care Act, which did not contain the Stupak language. Nelson introduced the Nelson Amendment to the America's Affordable Health Choices Act of 2009 to restrict federal funding of elective abortions.

=== Earmarks ===
In July 2007, Senator Tom Coburn of Oklahoma criticized earmarks that Nelson had inserted into the 2007 defense spending bill, alleging that they would benefit Nelson's son Patrick's employer with millions in federal dollars, and that the situation violated terms of the Federal Funding Accountability and Transparency Act of 2006, which the Senate passed but had not yet been voted on in the House. Nelson's spokesperson said he did nothing wrong and was acting with "an abundance of caution" when he withdrew the amendment after the new Senate Ethics Rules were passed. Some government watchdogs, including Public Citizen, commented that the earmark probably didn't violate ethics rules. More than one publication questioned Coburn's motives, as his criticism did not include his own state delegation's earmark requests.

=== Health care and "Cornhusker Kickback" ===
In late 2009, the Senate's 40 Republicans unanimously opposed the Patient Protection and Affordable Care Act, the Senate's version of health-care legislation. To end a Republican filibuster and pass the measure, the Democrats needed the votes of all 58 of their senators, plus those of two independents who caucused with their party. Nelson was the 60th and final senator to vote for cloture.

According to Nelson, he wanted to ensure that the final version of the law prohibited the use of public funds for abortions. His cloture vote came after the measure was amended to permit states to opt out of allowing insurance exchange plans to provide abortion coverage. People with plans that covered abortion costs would pay for that coverage separately from their payment for the rest of the plan. The bill also provided full and permanent federal reimbursement for the expenses Nebraska would incur in its mandated expansion of Medicaid eligibility, an amount the Congressional Budget Office estimated at $100 million. Nelson also opposed a public health insurance option in the bill.

The health-care measure was controversial, and Nelson's vote provoked a strong response. Opponents of the Medicaid reimbursement scheme derided it as the "Cornhusker Kickback". Among those denouncing the provision was Dave Heineman, Nebraska's Republican governor. To these criticisms, Nelson responded that he had been attempting to eliminate an unfunded federal mandate upon the states, and that the Nebraska item was a "placeholder", intended from the start to be replaced by a revision that would provide reimbursement for the increased Medicaid costs of every state.

Anti-abortion organizations also responded negatively to Nelson's vote. In April 2010, Nebraska Right to Life declared that it would never again endorse Nelson.

Nelson's popularity fell among Nebraskans in the wake of his cloture vote. According to Omaha.com, "Almost overnight, the controversial vote knocked [Nelson's] Nebraska voter approval rating from 78 percent, the highest in the Senate, to 42 percent, according to one poll, and prompted relentless criticism, with many observers saying his political career was over." A December 2009 Rasmussen poll indicated that in a hypothetical Nelson–Heineman race, the Republican would get 61% of the vote to Nelson's 30%. In the same poll, 64% of the Nebraska voters surveyed opposed the health-care bill.

With the surprise victory of Republican Scott Brown in the special election to fill the Senate seat vacated by the death of Senator Ted Kennedy, Democrats lost their filibuster-proof majority. Since Brown had declared himself opposed to the health-care measure, the party's leadership opted to enact the legislation through the budget reconciliation process. Nelson voted against the final version of the legislation, the Health Care and Education Reconciliation Act of 2010. His support for the measure was no longer essential to its passage, since the reconciliation bill was not subject to filibuster and required only a simple majority.

The measure as ultimately passed eliminated the special Medicaid reimbursement for Nebraska, as Nelson had requested in a letter to Senate Majority Leader Harry Reid about a month after his crucial cloture vote. Nelson said his opposition to the final measure arose from newly added provisions related to student loans that would adversely affect Nebraska-based student-lending firm Nelnet. Despite voting against it, he subsequently defended the law, saying, "I am willing to fight to improve it, but not to repeal it."

=== Iraq ===
On March 15, 2007, Nelson was among two Democratic senators to have voted against invoking cloture on a resolution aimed at withdrawing most American combat troops from Iraq in 2008. The vote, requiring 60 votes to pass, was 50 to 48 against.

As a result of traveling to Iraq four times, the last in September 2007, Nelson took the position that a transition of the mission in Iraq was necessary, as opposed to full withdrawal of troops. The Jones Commission supported his view on September 6, 2007, when General James L. Jones presented a report to Congress claiming that "The circumstances of the moment may continue to present the opportunity for considering a shift in the disposition and employment of our forces... such a strategy would include placing increasing responsibilities for the internal security of the nation on the ISF, especially in urban areas. Coalition forces could be re-tasked to better ensure the territorial defense of the state by increasingly concentrating on the eastern and western borders and the active defense of the critical infrastructures essential to Iraq." The premise that stability in Iraq would only be achieved through political reconciliation acted on through legislation, a view long held by Nelson, was also recommended by Jones, reporting, "The future of Iraq… hinges on the ability of the Iraqi people and the government to begin the process of achieving national reconciliation and to ending sectarian violence."

In the spring of 2007, Senators Nelson, Susan Collins of Maine, and John Warner of Virginia authored a list of measures, or "benchmarks", that were included in the Iraq Supplemental bill. These benchmarks allowed for progress to be measured in certain areas such as recognition of minority groups, strengthening of internal security forces, and equal distribution of oil revenue. President George W. Bush and General David Petraeus were required to report on the advancement of these "benchmarks".

Nelson and Collins also introduced legislation on July 11, 2007, that would transition U.S. troops out of Baghdad. The legislation called for turning over internal security efforts to Iraqi forces after which the U.S. military would secure the borders, protect the infrastructure, and continue to search for al-Qaeda forces.

=== Judicial appointments ===
Nelson was the lead Democratic senator among the "Gang of 14," a bloc of 14 senators who, on May 23, 2005, forged a compromise on the Democrats' use of the judicial filibuster, thus blocking the Republican leadership's attempt to implement the so-called "nuclear option". Under the gang's agreement, Democrats would retain the power to filibuster one of Bush's judicial nominees only in an "extraordinary circumstance", and the three most conservative Bush appellate court nominees (Janice Rogers Brown, Priscilla Owen and William Pryor) would receive a vote by the full Senate. Nelson was the only Democrat to vote to confirm Brown; he was later the first Democratic senator to support Samuel Alito's confirmation to the U.S. Supreme Court. Nelson also voted twice, with three other Democrats, to end Senate debate over Bush's United Nations Ambassador nominee John Bolton.

In an op-ed column, Nelson wrote: "The president's nominees, especially to the Supreme Court, deserve an up-or-down vote, even if the nominee isn't popular with the special-interest groups in Washington."

In 2010, when Barack Obama nominated Elena Kagan to the Supreme Court, Nelson was the only Democrat to vote against her confirmation, saying "I have heard concerns from Nebraskans regarding Ms. Kagan, and her lack of a judicial record makes it difficult for me to discount the concerns raised by Nebraskans, or to reach a level of comfort that these concerns are unfounded. Therefore, I will not vote to confirm Ms. Kagan's nomination"

=== Same-sex marriage ===
In 1996, Nelson proposed and supported legislation to prevent Nebraska from recognizing same-sex marriages formed in other states. This was his response to a court case in Hawaii that Nelson feared would legalize gay marriage.

Nelson supported Initiative 416, an amendment to the Nebraska constitution prohibiting same-sex marriage and domestic partnership.

=== Taxes ===
Nelson was among five Democratic senators to vote for the Economic Growth and Tax Relief Reconciliation Act of 2001. The measure called for $1.35 trillion in tax cuts over 11 years and nearly $2 trillion in spending for the next fiscal year. The spending was close to that proposed by Bush; the tax cuts were slightly less than the $1.6 trillion Bush sought. Nelson also voted for passage of the 2003 tax cut which accelerated many of the provisions in the 2001 tax cut in addition to benefits for small businesses.

In October 2009, Americans for Tax Reform stated that Nelson was the only Democratic senator who had signed its Taxpayer Protection Pledge, and launched an advocacy campaign to urge him to oppose the health care reform proposals in Congress, which, they asserted, contained "billions of dollars in income tax hikes."

In July 2012, Nelson, with 18 other senators, cosponsored a bill that would allow states to collect sales taxes on interstate sales, including catalogue and Internet sales. The bill (Marketplace Fairness Act, S.1832) would require any seller who sold a product or service to a consumer from another state to calculate, collect and pay to that other state the sales tax based on that state's tax rates. Proponents argued that the measure would redress an unfair economic advantage enjoyed by online sellers over local businesses arising from the fact that the former were often not required to collect sales taxes from their customers. Opponents maintained that it would be unfair to require interstate merchants to collect sales taxes in jurisdictions where they had no physical presence, and thus derived no benefit from the taxes; and that the variety and complexity of state and local sales taxes would place a burden on merchants required to keep track of them in order to collect the taxes.

=== Other votes ===
Nelson's votes in the Senate often placed him at odds with the leadership of his party. A National Journal congressional vote rating from 2006 placed him to the right of five Senate Republicans (Gordon Smith, Olympia Snowe, Arlen Specter, Susan Collins, and Lincoln Chafee). Mary Landrieu was the only other Democrat to the right of any Republicans (she placed to the right of Chafee). A similar 2007 National Journal rating went even further, placing Nelson to the right of eight Senate Republicans (the above five as well as Richard Lugar, Norm Coleman, and Mike DeWine), with Landrieu once again to Chafee's right and the only other Democrat to the right of any Republicans. For 2012, the American Conservative Union rated his overall performance at 48 percent, the highest of any Democratic senator.

Nelson was one of only two Democratic senators to vote against the Bipartisan Campaign Reform Act of 2002. He voted with Republicans on bankruptcy reform, environmental protection, class action lawsuits, and trade. In 2004 he was one of only three Democratic senators to vote to invoke cloture on the proposed Federal Marriage Amendment; in 2006 he was one of only two Democratic senators to vote that way. He was the only Democratic senator to vote against a 2006 bill that would have extended federal funding for stem cell research. But he consistently voted against drilling in the Arctic National Wildlife Refuge. He also opposed Bush's plan to send 21,500 more troops to Iraq. Early in Bush's first term he voted with the majority of his party against scrapping President Bill Clinton's expansive new rules on ergonomics regulation for workers; many of his fellow conservative Democrats like John Breaux, Max Baucus, Blanche Lincoln, and Zell Miller voted with Republicans on the issue. On April 26, 2010, Nelson was one of two Democratic senators in attendance to vote against the motion to move a financial regulations bill forward, siding with Senate Republicans. The other was Harry Reid, who voted against his own proposed bill for procedural reasons.

On December 18, 2010, Nelson voted with Democrats for the Don't Ask, Don't Tell Repeal Act of 2010.

== Post-Senate career ==
In January 2013, Nelson was named chief executive officer of the National Association of Insurance Commissioners, an organization of state insurance regulatory agencies for the United States and several of its territories. The body establishes standards and coordinates regulatory oversight for the state agencies. He left the association and returned to his private law practice in January 2016.

== Personal life ==
Nelson lives in Omaha with his wife, Diane. They had 4 children together, and have 5 grandchildren. In 2016, their daughter Sarah died at the age of 46 after a fall at her home in Palm Springs, California.

== Electoral history ==
1990 Nebraska gubernatorial election
Party	Candidate	Votes	%
Democratic	Ben Nelson	292,771	49.91
Republican	Kay Orr (incumbent)	288,741	49.23
Write-in	Mort Sullivan	1,887	0.32
Write-in	Others	3,143	0.54

1994 Nebraska gubernatorial election
Party	Candidate	Votes	%
Democratic	Ben Nelson (incumbent)	423,270	73.0
Republican	Gene Spence	148,230	25.6
Write-in	Ernie Chambers	2,510	0.4
Write-in	Others	5,551	1.0

Nebraska U.S. Senate Election 1996
Party	Candidate	Votes	%	±%
Republican	Chuck Hagel	379,933	56.14%	+15.21%
Democratic	Ben Nelson	281,904	41.65%	−17.25%
Libertarian	John DeCamp	9,483	1.40%	
Natural Law	Bill Dunn	4,806	0.71%	
Write-ins		663	0.10%	

Nebraska U.S. Senate Election 2000
Party	Candidate	Votes	%	±%
Democratic	Ben Nelson	353,093	51.00%	−3.78%
Republican	Don Stenberg	337,977	48.82%	+3.81%
Write-ins		1,280	0.18%	

Nebraska U.S. Senate Election 2006
Party	Candidate	Votes	%	±%
Democratic	Ben Nelson (Incumbent)	378,388	63.88%	+12.88%
Republican	Pete Ricketts	213,928	36.12%	−12.70%

== See also ==
- Conservative Democrat

Party political offices
Preceded by Helen Boosalis	Democratic nominee for Governor of Nebraska; 1990, 1994	Succeeded by Bill Hoppner
Preceded by J. James Exon	Democratic nominee for U.S. Senator from Nebraska (Class 2); 1996	Succeeded by Charlie Matulka
Preceded by Bob Kerrey	Democratic nominee for U.S. Senator from Nebraska (Class 1); 2000, 2006	Succeeded by Bob Kerrey
Political offices
Preceded by Kay Orr	Governor of Nebraska; 1991–1999	Succeeded by Mike Johanns
U.S. Senate
Preceded by Bob Kerrey	U.S. Senator (Class 1) from Nebraska; 2001–2013; Served alongside: Chuck Hagel, Mike Johanns	Succeeded by Deb Fischer
U.S. order of precedence (ceremonial)
Preceded by Bob Kerrey as Former U.S. Senator	Order of precedence of the United States as Former U.S. Senator	Succeeded by Gary Hart as Former U.S. Senator
