= 2024 in Nebraska =

- Decades: 2000s; 2010s; 2020s
- See also: History of Nebraska; Historical outline of Nebraska; List of years in Nebraska; 2024 in the United States

The following is a list of events of the year 2024 in Nebraska.

== Incumbents ==
=== State government ===
- Governor: Jim Pillen (R)
- Lieutenant Governor: Joe Kelly (R)

== Events ==
- April 22
  - 2024 Bennet Train Sabotage
- April 26 – Tornado outbreak sequence of April 25–28, 2024: A tornado outbreak in areas near Omaha, leads to the issuance of multiple tornado emergencies across the states of Nebraska and Iowa.
- May 14 –
  - 2024 Nebraska Democratic presidential primary
  - 2024 Nebraska Republican presidential primary
- July 31 – Strong thunderstorms and winds in eastern Nebraska cause significant destruction, causing widespread power outages in Lincoln and Omaha.
- November 5 –
  - 2024 Nebraska Right to Abortion Initiative
  - 2024 United States presidential election in Nebraska
  - Nebraska votes approve the use of Medical cannabis

== See also ==
- 2024 in the United States
