= 2025 in Nebraska =

- Decades: 2000s; 2010s; 2020s
- See also: History of Nebraska; Historical outline of Nebraska; List of years in Nebraska; 2025 in the United States

The following is a list of events of the year 2025 in Nebraska.

== Incumbents ==
=== State government ===
- Governor: Jim Pillen (R)
- Lieutenant Governor: Joe Kelly (R)

== Events ==
- February 25–April 30 – A series of wildfires take place in the state.
- May 3 – Warren Buffett, CEO of Omaha-based Berkshire Hathaway, announces he will step down from his role and have Greg Abel replace him.
- May 13 – 2025 Omaha mayoral election – Democrat John Ewing Jr. defeats incumbent Republican Jean Stothert to win election as Mayor of Omaha, becoming the first African American to hold the office.
- July 2 – Community Hospital announces they will be closing Curtis Medical Center in Curtis in response to expected cuts to Medicaid.
- July 4 – In Seward, a time capsule from 1975 once called the world's largest is reopened.
- July 16 – The state of Nebraska sues Colorado, claiming they take too much water from the South Platte River.
- July 29 – Two girls and an employee are killed in an explosion at a biofuel plant in Fremont.
- August 19 – Governor Pillen announces the state of Nebraska will convert the Work Ethic Camp in McCook into an Immigration and Customs Enforcement facility called the "Cornhusker Clink".

== Sports ==
- May: 2025 Summit League baseball tournament

== See also ==
- 2025 in the United States
