= 2021 in Nebraska =

- Decades: 2000s; 2010s; 2020s
- See also: History of Nebraska; Historical outline of Nebraska; List of years in Nebraska; 2021 in the United States

The following is a list of events of the year 2021 in Nebraska.

== Incumbents ==
=== State government ===
- Governor: Pete Ricketts (R)
- Lieutenant Governor: Mike Foley (R)

== Events ==
- April 6 - Hayes Center, Nebraska, becomes the first city in Nebraska to outlaw abortion by local ordinance, declaring itself a "sanctuary city for the unborn."
- October 21 - Superior, Nebraska shooting
- October-December - 2021 Kellogg's strike

== See also ==
- 2021 in the United States
