= 2026 in Nebraska =

- Decades: 2000s; 2010s; 2020s
- See also: History of Nebraska; Historical outline of Nebraska; List of years in Nebraska; 2026 in the United States

The following is a list of events of the year 2026 in Nebraska.

== Incumbents ==
=== State government ===
- Governor: Jim Pillen (R)
- Lieutenant Governor: Joe Kelly (R)

== Events ==
=== January ===
- January 5 – 2025–26 United States measles outbreak: Three confirmed cases of measles are reported in Platte County, bringing the total to four, all in the same household.
- January 13 – State Senator Dan McKeon (R-Amherst) announces his resignation ahead of an expulsion vote over accusations he sexually harassed a legislative staffer.

=== March ===
- March 1 – A 4.1 magnitude earthquake strikes south-central Nebraska, with the epicenter being three miles east of Cowles.

=== August ===
- August 18 – Omaha Public Schools Superintendent Matthew Ray requests school resource officers (SROs) cease using gloves that can deliver electric shocks, saying he was unaware of SROs using them until the previous week.

=== November ===
- November 3 – 2026 Nebraska elections:
  - 2026 Nebraska Legislature election
  - 2026 Nebraska gubernatorial election: Jim Pillen wins reelection.
  - 2026 Nebraska State Board of Education election
  - 2026 Douglas County, Nebraska, elections
  - 2026 Nebraska Public Service Commission election
  - 2026 United States House of Representatives elections in Nebraska
  - 2026 United States Senate election in Nebraska: Pete Ricketts wins reelection, beating challenger Dan Osborn.
  - 2026 University of Nebraska Board of Regents election

== Sports ==
- 2025–26 Nebraska Cornhuskers men's basketball team
- 2025–26 Nebraska Cornhuskers women's basketball team

== See also ==
- 2026 in the United States
