= 2023 in Nebraska =

- Decades: 2000s; 2010s; 2020s
- See also: History of Nebraska; Historical outline of Nebraska; List of years in Nebraska; 2023 in the United States

The following is a list of events of the year 2023 in Nebraska.

== Incumbents ==
=== State government ===
- Governor: Pete Ricketts (R) (until January 5), Jim Pillen (R) (starting January 5)
- Lieutenant Governor: Mike Foley (R) (until January 5), Joe Kelly (R) (starting January 5)

== Events ==
- June 30 – Biden v. Nebraska: In a 6–3 decision, the U.S. Supreme Court rules that the secretary of education does not have the power to waive student loans under the HEROES Act.
- August 30 – In an event billed as "Volleyball Day in Nebraska", 92,003 people fill the University of Nebraska's Memorial Stadium for a match between the Nebraska Cornhuskers and Omaha Mavericks, setting a new verified attendance record for a women's sports event.
- September 14 – An explosion at the Union Pacific Railroad Bailey Yard in North Platte, the world’s largest railyard, causes evacuations in the area due to toxic smoke.

== See also ==
- 2023 in the United States
