= 2022 in Nebraska =

- Decades: 2000s; 2010s; 2020s
- See also: History of Nebraska; Historical outline of Nebraska; List of years in Nebraska; 2022 in the United States

The following is a list of events of the year 2022 in Nebraska.

== Incumbents ==
=== State government ===
- Governor: Pete Ricketts (R)
- Lieutenant Governor: Mike Foley (R)

== Events ==
- May 21- Josh fight The anniversary event was organized by the Arizonan Swain, with donations once again going to the CH&MC.

Viking Saga censorship incident

== See also ==
- 2022 in the United States
