= 2024 Bennet Train Sabotage =

Non-fatal train crash in Bennet, Nebraska

- Location: 40.67812186°N 96.50706489°W; Bennet, Nebraska
- Date: April 22, 2024; 6:10 p.m. (CST)
- Target: BNSF Railway
- Attack type: Rail sabotage
- Victims: 2
- Motive: fame from viral video
- Charges: Criminal mischief
- Convicted: Zachary Hertzler

On April 22, 2024, a BNSF Railway freight train crashed into an empty coal car in Bennet, Nebraska. The incident was filmed by a railfan named Zachary Hertzler, who uploaded the footage to his YouTube channel. Hertzler's footage went viral being viewed by at least 600,000 times. Hertzler was later convicted of causing the crash.

== Incident ==
At 6:10 p.m., on April 22, 2024, a train carrying coal was traveling east in Bennet, Nebraska. The railroad switch was turned the wrong way, leading the train towards a coal car. The conductor noticed the switch and started an emergency stop. The train crashed into the coal car and derailed, but stayed upright. 17-year-old Zachary Hertzler filmed the incident.

== Aftermath ==
The Lancaster County Sheriff's Office and Bennet Fire and Rescue were dispatched to the scene, but did not provide any assistance.

The incident cost a combined $344,000 in repairs. It cost BNSF $194,000 to repair the cars, and Omaha Public Power District $150,000 to repair the track.

On April 23, 2024, Hertzler uploaded the footage to his YouTube channel “Capitol City Rail Productions.” The video includes a voiceover intro explaining the background of the crash, footage of the crash, and footage taken after the crash. Hertzler alleges the crew who left the coal car on the track forgot to move the switch back. The video went viral, netting at least 611,000 views before deletion. Hertzler would also send his footage to KOLN.

On May 7, 2024, Hertzler uploaded a followup video where he responds to comments on the first video. Hertzler responds to comments pointing out inconsistencies in his narrative, specifically that the crew could not have kept driving on if they had left the switch turned off-track. Hertzler explained he was just repeating what an investigator told him. The investigator denies ever saying this. Hertzler goes on to show footage of other trains he captured and more footage from the crash site. The video was viewed at least 11,000 times.

On May 23, 2024, Hertzler uploaded a third video where he returned to the crash site. The video was viewed at least 8,000 times.

== Investigation ==
The crash was investigated by the BNSF Police Department. A padlock that was meant to be on the switch was missing, suggesting tampering. Hertzler approached the investigator and asked him what happened. The investigator said they did not know, to which Hertzler responded, “Obviously, a switch was flipped the wrong way.” Hertzler then showed the investigator his footage of the crash, and other footage he had taken of trains. Police began to look through surveillance footage from areas around the crash site. The footage showed a male driving a 1996 Buick Park Avenue shortly before the crash. One camera showed Hertzler walking towards the switch, off-camera, walking back, and driving off. He later returned and set up a tripod four minutes before the crash.

On May 14, 2024, police were able to confirm the model and license plate matched Hertzler’s vehicle.

On July 8, 2024, police got a search warrant for Hertzler's cell phone, but were unable to get any information from it.

== Sentencing ==
Hertzler was charged with two counts of criminal mischief over $5,000. His bond was set at $500. On August 19, 2024, Judge Roger Heideman moved to have Hertzler tried as an adult, citing notoriety as a motive. Hertzler appealed the decision, which was denied on January 20, 2025. On April 6, 2026, Hertzler pleaded no contest on one count of criminal mischief. On June 22, 2026, Hertzler was sentenced to five years probation.

== See also ==
- List of BNSF Railway accidents and incidents
- History of Bennet, Nebraska
