= Outline of Nebraska =

Overview of and topical guide to Nebraska

The flag of Nebraska

The seal of Nebraska

The location of the state of Nebraska in the United States of America

The following outline is provided as an overview of and topical guide to the U.S. state of Nebraska:

Nebraska – U.S. state located in the Great Plains of the Midwestern United States. Nebraska was once considered part of the Great American Desert, but it is now a leading farming and ranching state.

== General reference ==
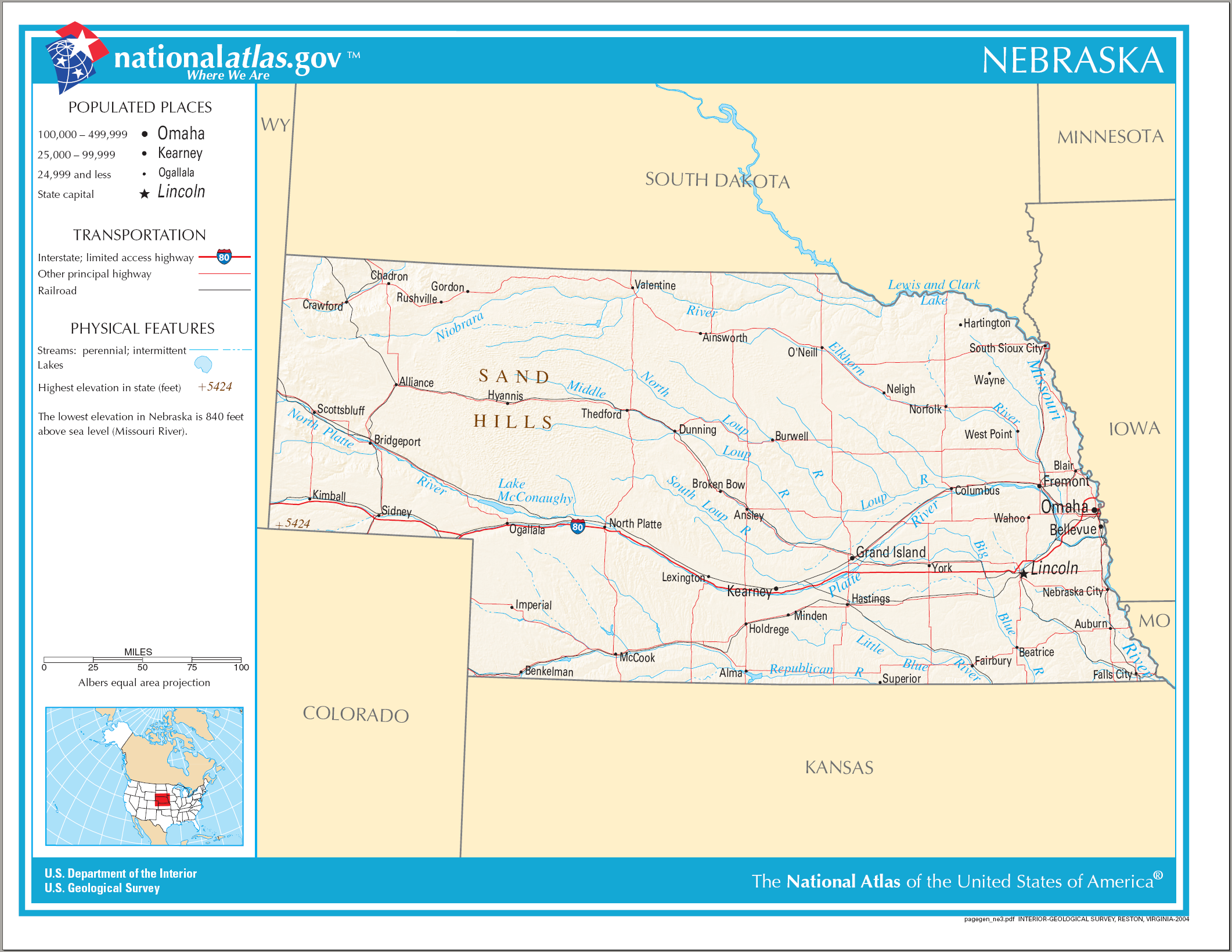
An enlargeable map of the state of Nebraska

- Names
  - Common name: Nebraska
    - Pronunciation: /nəˈbræskə/
  - Official name: State of Nebraska
  - Abbreviations and name codes
    - Postal symbol: NE
    - ISO 3166-2 code: US-NE
    - Internet second-level domain: .ne.us
  - Nicknames
    - Beef State (previously used on license plates)
    - Cornhusker State (previously used on license plates)
    - Tree Planter's State
- Adjectival: Nebraska
- Demonym: Nebraskan

== Geography of Nebraska ==
Geography of Nebraska

- Nebraska is: a U.S. state, a federal state of the United States of America
- Location
  - Northern Hemisphere
  - Western Hemisphere
    - Americas
      - North America
        - Anglo America
        - Northern America
          - United States of America
            - Contiguous United States
              - Central United States
                - Corn Belt
                - West North Central States
              - Midwestern United States
          - Great Plains
- Population of Nebraska: 1,826,341 (2010 U.S. Census)
- Area of Nebraska: 77,347.428 sq mi (200,328.919 km^{2})
- Atlas of Nebraska

=== Places in Nebraska ===
- Historic places in Nebraska
  - National Historic Landmarks in Nebraska
  - National Register of Historic Places listings in Nebraska
    - Bridges on the National Register of Historic Places in Nebraska
- National Natural Landmarks in Nebraska
- National parks in Nebraska
- State parks in Nebraska

=== Environment of Nebraska ===
- Climate of Nebraska
- Superfund sites in Nebraska
- Wildlife of Nebraska
  - Fauna of Nebraska
    - Birds of Nebraska

==== Natural geographic features of Nebraska ====
- Lakes of Nebraska
- Rivers of Nebraska

=== Regions of Nebraska ===
- Western Nebraska

==== Administrative divisions of Nebraska ====
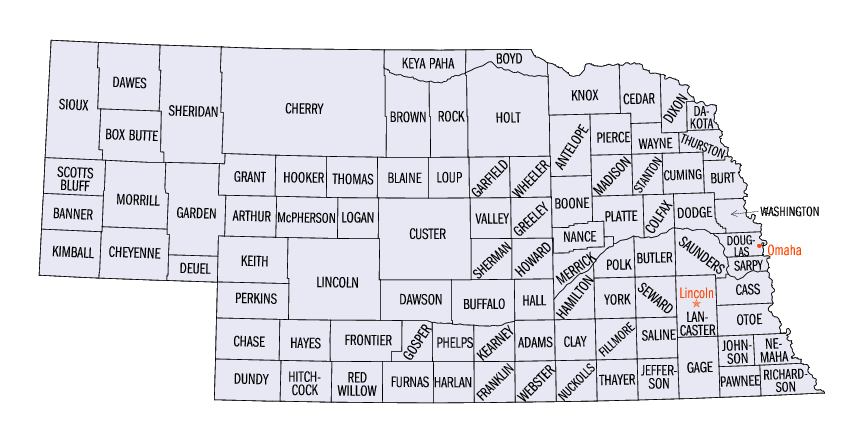
An enlargeable map of the 93 counties of the state of Nebraska

- The 93 counties of the state of Nebraska
  - Townships in Nebraska
  - Precincts in Nebraska
  - Cities in Nebraska
  - Villages in Nebraska
  - Unincorporated communities in Nebraska

=== Demography of Nebraska ===
Demographics of Nebraska

== Government and politics of Nebraska ==
Politics of Nebraska

- Form of government: U.S. state government
- Nebraska's congressional delegations
- Nebraska State Capitol
- Elections in Nebraska
  - Electoral reform in Nebraska
- Political party strength in Nebraska

=== Branches of the government of Nebraska ===
Government of Nebraska

==== Executive branch of the government of Nebraska ====
- Governor of Nebraska
  - Lieutenant Governor of Nebraska
  - Secretary of State of Nebraska
- State departments
  - Nebraska Department of Roads

==== Legislative branch of the government of Nebraska ====
- Nebraska Legislature (unicameral)

==== Judicial branch of the government of Nebraska ====
Courts of Nebraska

- Supreme Court of Nebraska

=== Law and order in Nebraska ===
- Law of Nebraska
- Cannabis in Nebraska
- Capital punishment in Nebraska
  - Individuals executed in Nebraska
- Constitution of Nebraska
- Crime in Nebraska
- Gun laws in Nebraska
- Law enforcement in Nebraska
  - Law enforcement agencies in Nebraska

=== Military in Nebraska ===
- Nebraska Air National Guard
- Nebraska Army National Guard

== History of Nebraska ==
History of Nebraska

=== History of Nebraska, by period ===
The location of the state of Nebraska in the United States of America

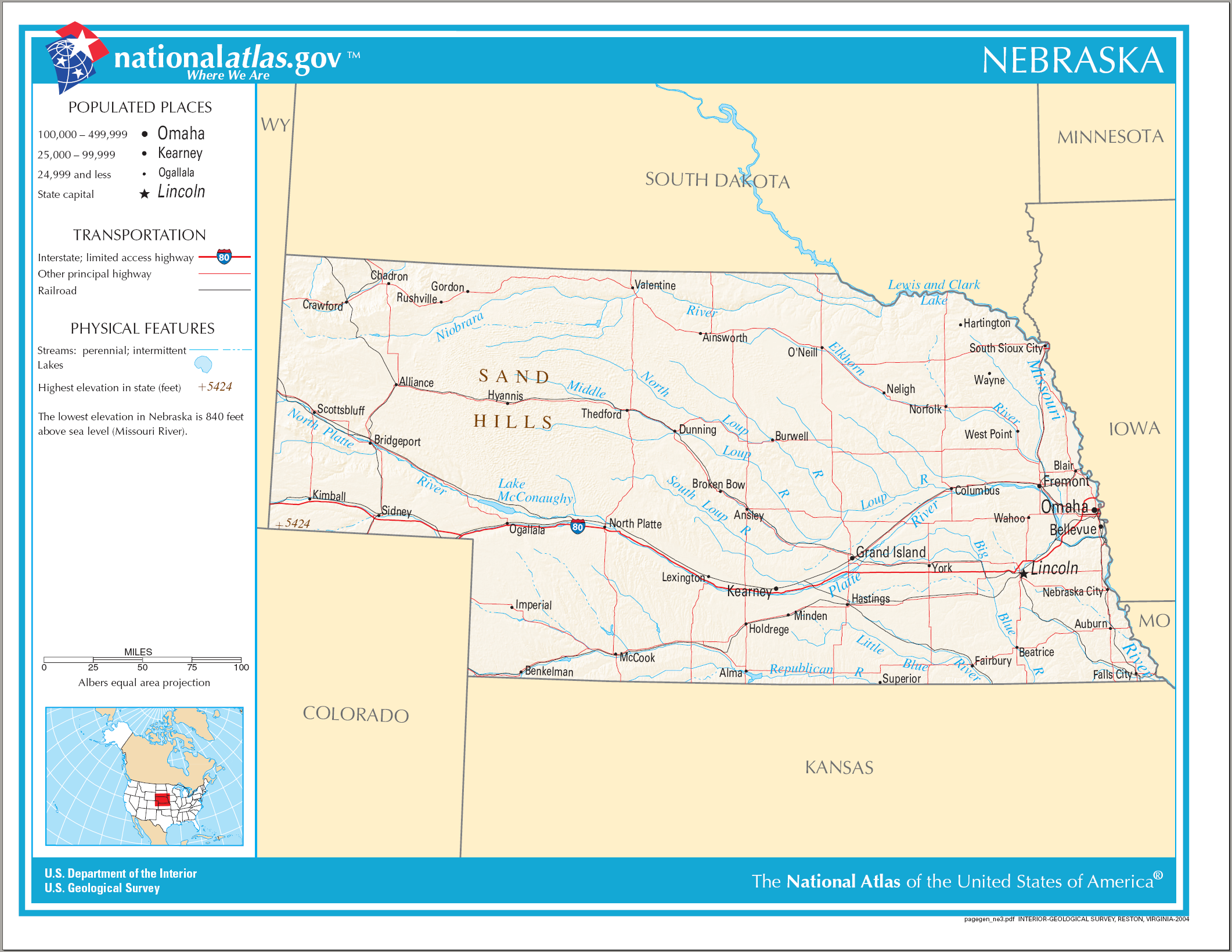
An enlargeable map of the state of Nebraska

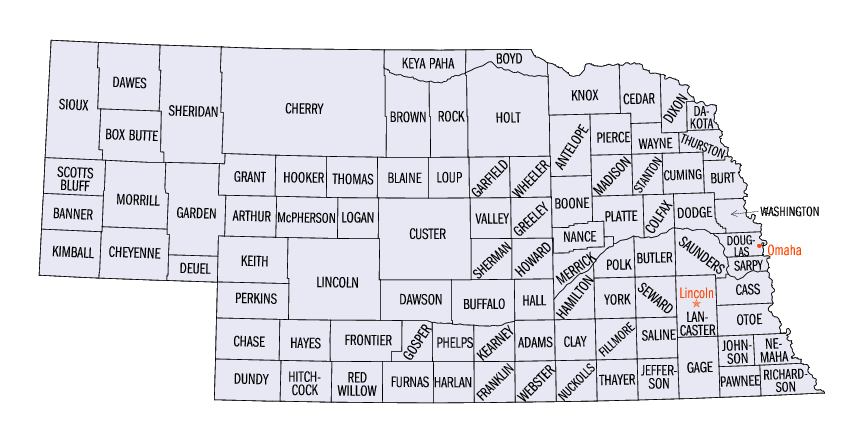
An enlargeable map of the 93 counties of the state of Nebraska

- Prehistory of Nebraska
- French colony of Louisiane, 1699–1764
  - Treaty of Fontainebleau of 1762
- Spanish (though predominantly Francophone) district of Alta Louisiana, 1764–1803
  - Third Treaty of San Ildefonso of 1800
- French district of Haute-Louisiane, 1803
  - Louisiana Purchase of 1803
- Unorganized U.S. territory created by the Louisiana Purchase, 1803–1804
  - Lewis and Clark Expedition, 1804–1806
- District of Louisiana, 1804–1805
- Territory of Louisiana, 1805–1812
- Territory of Missouri, 1812–1821
  - War of 1812, June 18, 1812 – March 23, 1815
    - Treaty of Ghent, December 24, 1814
- Unorganized Territory, 1821–1854
  - Mexican–American War, April 25, 1846 – February 2, 1848
  - Treaty of Fort Laramie of 1851
- Nebraska Territory, 1854–1867
  - Kansas–Nebraska Act of 1854
  - History of slavery in Nebraska
  - Territory of Jefferson (extralegal), 1859–1861
  - Pony Express, 1860–1861
  - American Civil War, April 12, 1861 – May 13, 1865
    - Nebraska in the American Civil War
  - First Transcontinental Telegraph completed 1861
- State of Nebraska becomes 37th State admitted to the United States of America on March 1, 1867
  - Gerald Ford becomes 38th President of the United States on August 9, 1974

=== History of Nebraska, by region ===
- By city
  - History of Lincoln, Nebraska
  - History of Omaha, Nebraska
    - History of North Omaha, Nebraska

=== History of Nebraska, by subject ===
- List of Nebraska state legislatures
- History of slavery in Nebraska

== Culture of Nebraska ==
Culture of Nebraska

- Museums in Nebraska
- Religion in Nebraska
  - Episcopal Diocese of Nebraska
- Scouting in Nebraska
- State symbols of Nebraska
  - Flag of the State of Nebraska
  - Great Seal of the State of Nebraska

=== The Arts in Nebraska ===
- Music of Nebraska

=== Sports in Nebraska ===
Sports in Nebraska

== Economy and infrastructure of Nebraska ==
Economy of Nebraska

- Communications in Nebraska
  - Newspapers in Nebraska
  - Radio stations in Nebraska
  - Television stations in Nebraska
- Energy in Nebraska
  - List of power stations in Nebraska
  - Solar power in Nebraska
  - Wind power in Nebraska
- Health care in Nebraska
  - Hospitals in Nebraska
- Transportation in Nebraska
  - Airports in Nebraska

== Education in Nebraska ==
Education in Nebraska

- Schools in Nebraska
  - School districts in Nebraska
    - High schools in Nebraska
  - Colleges and universities in Nebraska
    - University of Nebraska–Lincoln

== See also ==
- Topic overview:
  - Nebraska
  - Index of Nebraska-related articles
