= History of Nebraska =

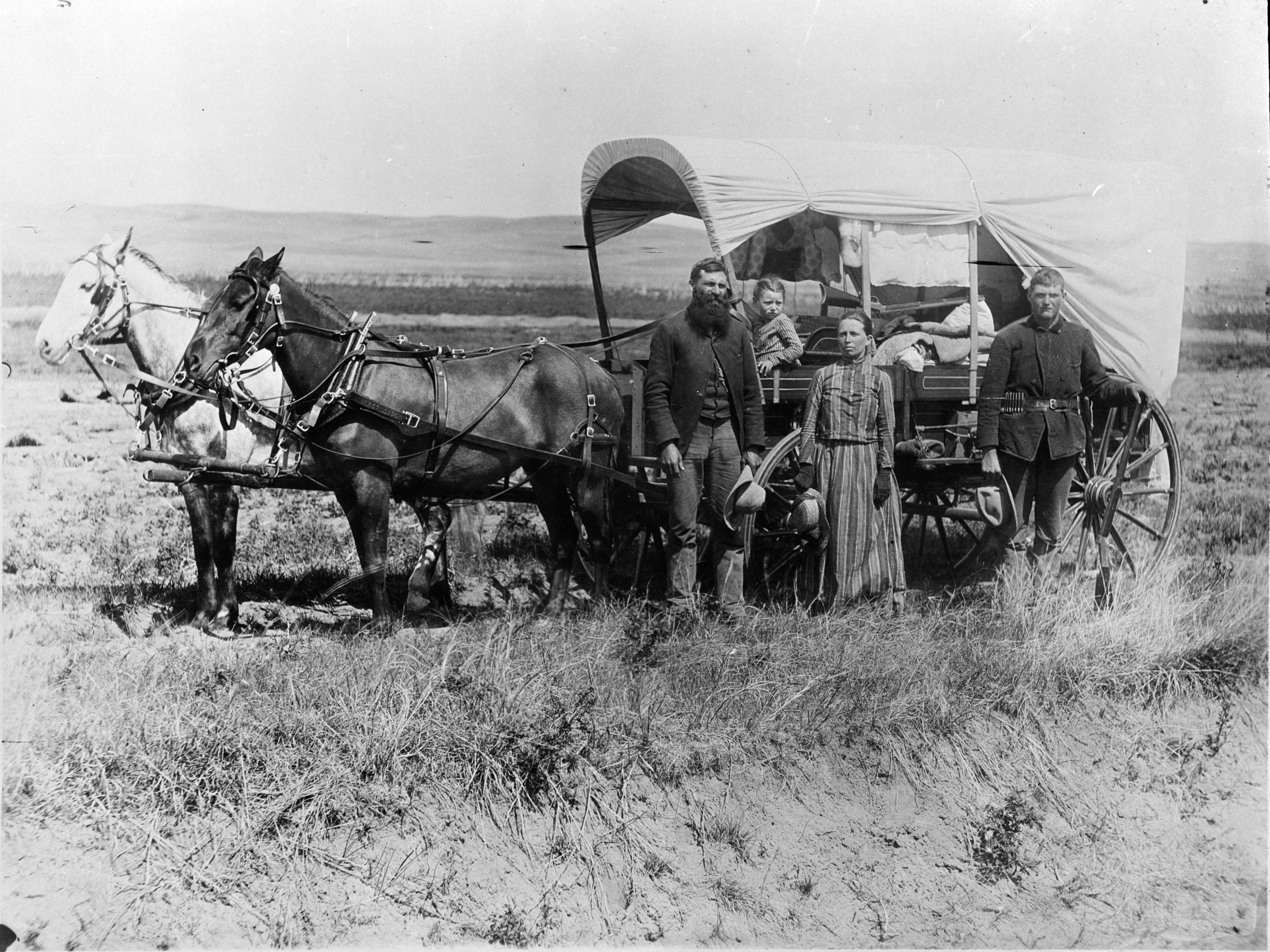
Homesteaders in central Nebraska in 1866

The history of the U.S. state of Nebraska dates back to its formation as a territory by the Kansas–Nebraska Act, passed by the United States Congress on May 30, 1854. The Nebraska Territory was settled extensively under the Homestead Act of 1862 during the 1860s, and in 1867 was admitted to the Union as the 37th U.S. state. The Plains Indians are the descendants of a long line of succeeding cultures of indigenous peoples in Nebraska who occupied the area for thousands of years before European arrival and continue to do so today.

== Prehistoric ==
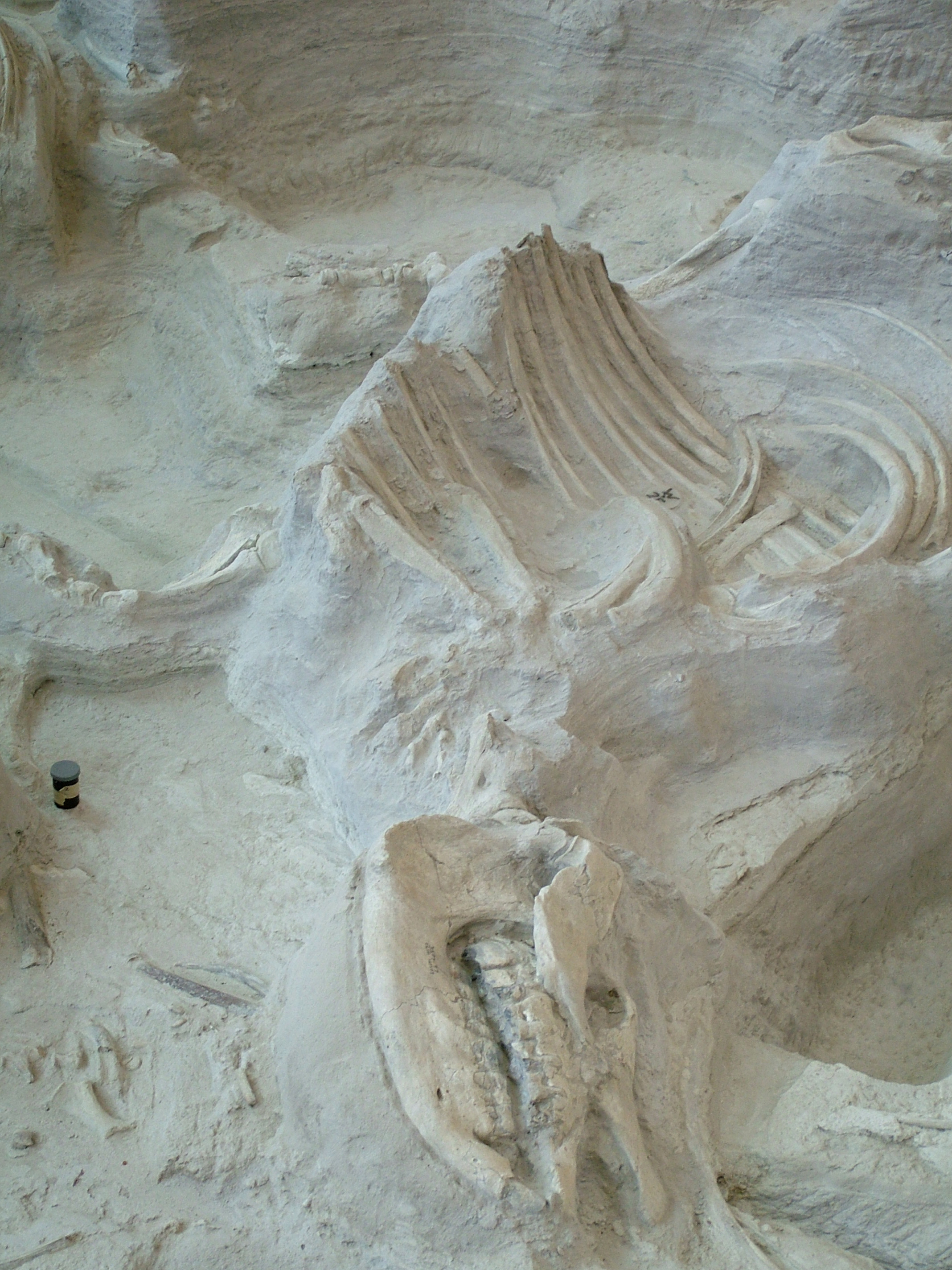
A Dinohippus fossil horse from the late Pliocene found at Ashfall State Historical Park near Royal

=== Mesozoic ===
During the Late Cretaceous, between 66 million to 99 million years ago, three-quarters of Nebraska was covered by the Western Interior Seaway, a large body of water that covered one-third of the United States. The sea was occupied by mosasaurs, ichthyosaurs, and plesiosaurs. Additionally, sharks such as Squalicorax, and fish such as Pachyrhizodus, Enchodus, and the Xiphactinus, a fish larger than any modern bony fish, occupied the sea. Other sea life included invertebrates such as mollusks, ammonites, squid-like belemnites, and plankton. Fossil skeletons of these animals and period plants were embedded in mud that hardened into rock and became the limestone that appears today on the sides of ravines and along the streams of Nebraska.

=== Cenozoic ===
==== Pliocene ====
As the sea bottom slowly rose, marshes and forests appeared. After thousands of years the land became drier, and trees of all kinds grew, including oak, maple, beech and willow. Fossil leaves from ancient trees are found today in the state's red sandstone rocks. Animals occupying the state during this period included camels, tapirs, monkeys, tigers and rhinos. The state also had a variety of horses native to its lands.

==== Pleistocene ====
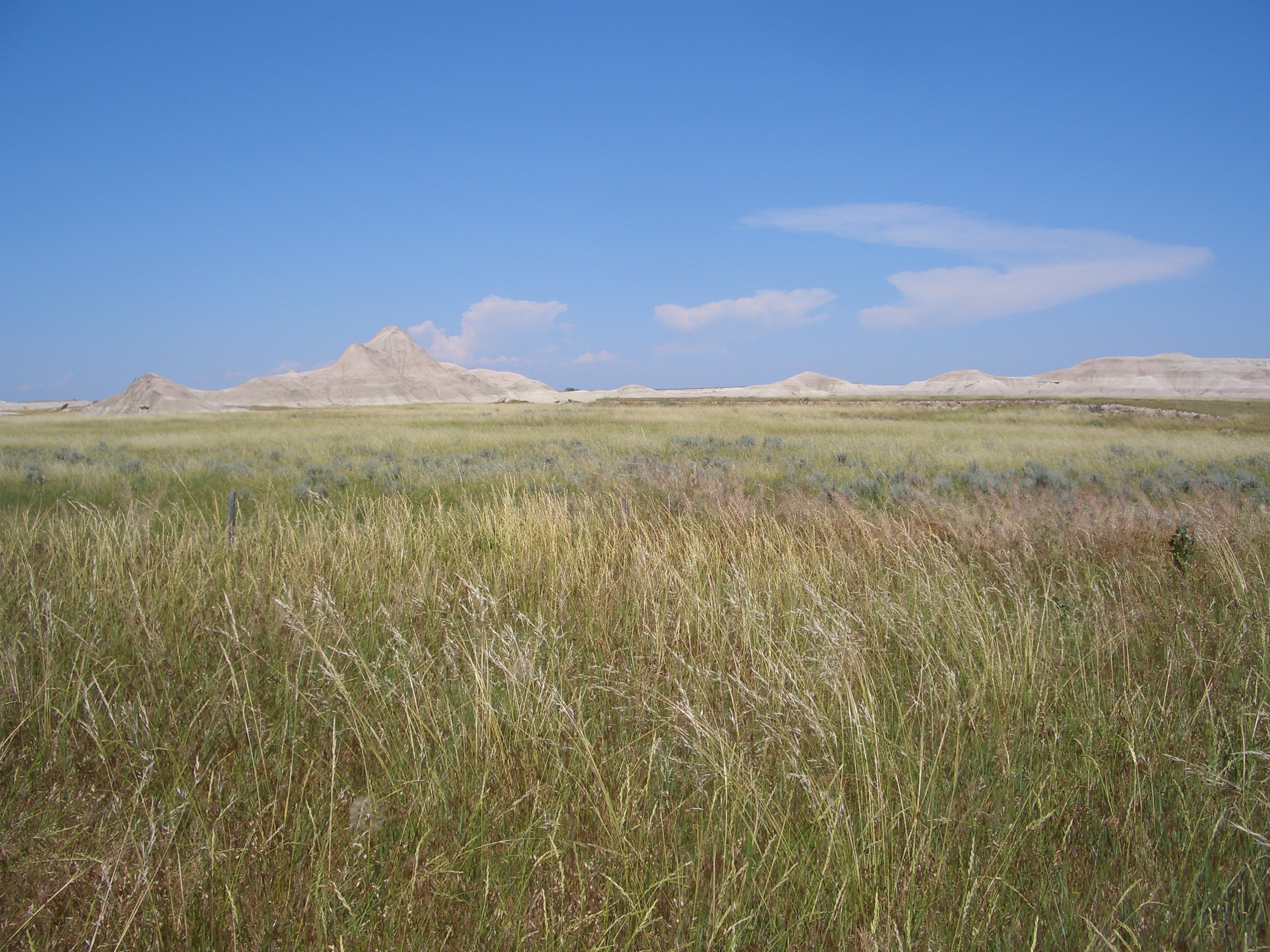
The Oglala National Grassland near Chadron, Nebraska

During the last ice age, continental ice sheets repeatedly covered eastern Nebraska. The exact timing that these glaciations occurred remain uncertain. Likely, they occurred between two million to 600,000 years ago. During the last two million years, the climate alternated between cold and warm phases, respectively called "glacial" and "interglacial" periods instead of a continuous ice age. Clayey tills and large boulders, called "glacial erratics", were left on the hillsides during the period when ice sheets covered eastern Nebraska two or three times. During various periods of the remainder of the Pleistocene and into the Holocene, the glacial drift was buried by silty, wind-blown sediment called "loess".

==== Holocene (present-day) ====
As the climate became drier grassy plains appeared, rivers began to cut their present valleys, and present Nebraska topography was formed. Animals appearing during this period remain in the state to this day.

== Indigenous settlement ==
Several language groups were represented by the American Indians in present-day Nebraska. The Algonquian-speaking Arapaho lived for more than 1,000 years throughout the western part of Nebraska. In a prehistoric period; Nebraska was home to the Arikara, who spoke a Caddoan language, as did the Pawnee; after 1823 they returned from present-day North Dakota to live with the Skidi Pawnee for two years. The Kiowa once occupied western Nebraska. The eastern range of the Algonquian-speaking Cheyenne included western Nebraska, after the Comanche who had formerly lived in the territory had moved south toward Texas.

The Great Sioux Nation, including the Ihanktowan-Ihanktowana and the Lakota located to the north and west, used Nebraska as a hunting and skirmish ground, although they did not have any long-term settlements in the state.

The Omaha belong to the Siouan-language family of the Dhegihan branch, and have been located along the Missouri River in northeastern Nebraska since the late 17th century, after having migrated from eastern areas together with other tribes. Originally living along the Ohio and Wabash rivers to the east, the Omaha, along with the Dhegihan Ponca, moved into Nebraska in the 1670s. Other Siouan-Dheigihan tribes who moved west from the Ohio River about then were the Osage, Kansa and Quapaw, who settled to the southwestern part of the territory. At that point the Ponca split, and the Omaha settled on Bow Creek in present-day Cedar County. Before 1700, the Iowa, a Siouan people whose language was Chiwere, moved from the Red Pipestone Quarry into Nebraska.

== European exploration: 1682–1853 ==
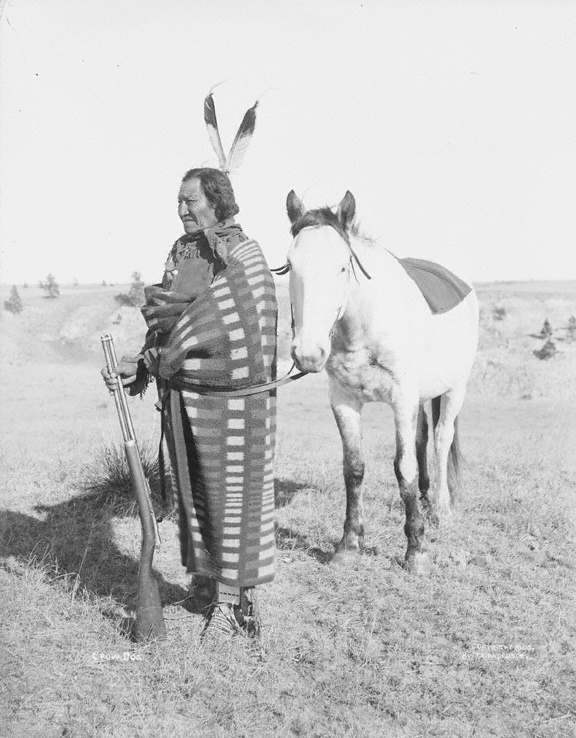
"Crow Dog", a Brulé Native American in 1898.

Several explorers from across Europe explored the lands that became Nebraska. In 1682, René-Robert Cavelier, Sieur de La Salle claimed the area first when he named all the territory drained by the Mississippi River and its tributaries for France, naming it the Louisiana Territory. In 1714, Etienne de Bourgmont traveled from the mouth of the Missouri River in Missouri to the mouth of the Platte River, which he called the Nebraskier River, becoming the first person to approximate the state's name.

In 1720, Spaniard Pedro de Villasur led an overland expedition that followed an Indian trail from Santa Fe to Nebraska. In a battle with the Oto and Pawnee, Villasur and 34 members of his party were killed near the juncture of the Loup and Platte Rivers just south of present-day Columbus, Nebraska. The survivors included twelve or thirteen Spanish soldiers and more than fifty Pueblo and Apache allies. Spanish influence over the region would never recover.

With the goal of reaching Santa Fe by water, a pair of French-Canadian explorers named Pierre and Paul Mallet reached the mouth of what they named the Platte River in 1739. They ended up following the south fork of the Platte into Colorado.

In 1762, by the Treaty of Fontainebleau after France's defeat by Great Britain in the Seven Years' War, France ceded its lands west of the Mississippi River to Spain, causing the future Nebraska to fall under the rule of New Spain, based in Mexico and the Southwest. In 1795 Jacques D'Eglise traveled the Missouri River Valley on behalf of the Spanish crown. Searching for the elusive Northwest Passage, D'Eglise did not go any further than central North Dakota.

=== Early European settlements ===
A group of St. Louis merchants, collectively known as the Missouri Company, funded a series of trading expeditions along the Missouri river. In 1794, Jean-Baptiste Truteau established a trading post 30 miles up the Niobrara River. A Scotsman named John McKay established a trading post on the west bank of the Missouri River in 1795. The post called Fort Charles was located south of present-day Dakota City, Nebraska.

In 1803, the United States purchased the Louisiana Territory from France for $15,000,000. What became Nebraska was under the "rule" of the United States for the first time. In 1812, President James Madison signed a bill creating the Missouri Territory, including the present-day state of Nebraska. Manuel Lisa, a Spanish fur trader from New Orleans, built a trading post called Fort Lisa in the Ponca Hills in 1812. His effort befriending local tribes is credited with thwarting British influence in the area during the War of 1812.

The U.S. Army established Fort Atkinson near today's Fort Calhoun in 1820, in order to protect the area's burgeoning fur trade industry. In 1822, the Missouri Fur Company built a headquarters and trading post about nine miles north of the mouth of the Platte River and called it Bellevue, establishing the first town in Nebraska. In 1824, Jean-Pierre Cabanné established Cabanne's Trading Post for John Jacob Astor's American Fur Company near Fort Lisa at the confluence of Ponca Creek and the Missouri River. It became a well-known post in the region.

In 1833, Moses P. Merill established a mission among the Otoe Indians. The Moses Merill Mission was sponsored by the Baptist Missionary Union. The Presbyterian missionary John Dunbar built a settlement by the Pawnee Indian's main village in 1841 by modern-day Fremont, Nebraska. The settlement grew quickly as government-financed teachers, blacksmiths and farmers joined the Pawnees and Dunbar, but the settlement disappeared practically overnight when Lakota raids scared the gathered whites off the plains. In 1842, John C. Frémont completed his exploration of the Platte River country with Kit Carson in Bellevue. He sold his mules and government wagons at auction in there. On this mapping trip, Frémont used the Otoe word Nebrathka to designate the Platte River. Platte is from the French word for "flat", the translation of Ne-brath-ka, meaning "land of flat waters."

== 1854–1867 ==
=== Territorial period ===
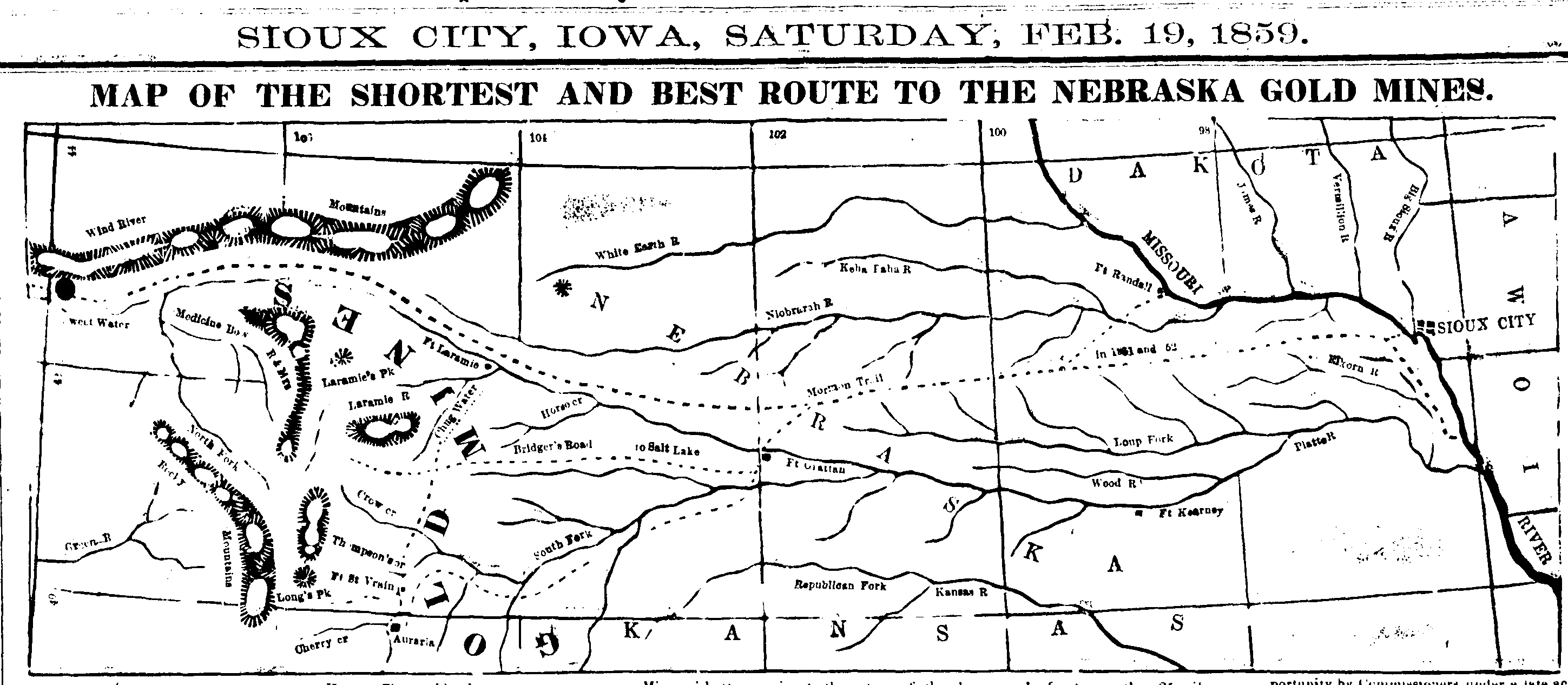
1859 map of route from Sioux City, Iowa, through Nebraska, to gold fields of Wyoming, partially following old Mormon trails.

The Kansas–Nebraska Act of 1854 established the 40th parallel north as the dividing line between the territories of Kansas and Nebraska. As such, the original territorial boundaries of Nebraska were much larger than today; the territory was bounded on the west by the Continental Divide between the Pacific and Atlantic Oceans; on the north by the 49th parallel north (the boundary between the United States and Canada), and on the east by the White Earth and Missouri rivers. However, the creation of new territories by acts of Congress progressively reduced the size of Nebraska.

Most settlers were farmers, but another major economic activity involved support for travelers using the Platte River trails. After gold was discovered in Wyoming in 1859, a rush of speculators followed overland trails through the interior of Nebraska. The Missouri River towns became important terminals of an overland freighting business that carried goods brought up the river in steamboats over the plains to trading posts and Army forts in the mountains. Stagecoaches provided passenger, mail, and express service, and for a few months in 1860–1861 the famous Pony Express provided mail service.

Many wagon trains trekked through Nebraska on the way west. They were assisted by soldiers at Ft. Kearny and other Army forts guarding the Platte River Road between 1846 and 1869. Fort commanders assisted destitute civilians by providing them with food and other supplies while those who could afford it purchased supplies from post sutlers. Travelers also received medical care, had access to blacksmithing and carpentry services for a fee, and could rely on fort commanders to act as law enforcement officials. Fort Kearny also provided mail services and, by 1861, telegraph services. Moreover, soldiers facilitated travel by making improvements on roads, bridges, and ferries. The forts additionally gave rise to towns along the Platte River route.

The wagon trains gave way to railroad traffic as the Union Pacific Railroad—the eastern half of the first transcontinental railroad—was constructed west from Omaha through the Platte Valley. It opened service to California in 1869. In 1867 Colorado was split off and Nebraska, reduced in size to its modern boundaries, was admitted to the Union.

=== Land changes ===
On February 28, 1861, Colorado Territory took portions of the territory south of 41° N and west of 102°03' W (25° W of Washington, DC). On March 2, 1861, Dakota Territory took all of the portions of Nebraska Territory north of 43° N (the present-day Nebraska–South Dakota border), along with the portion of present-day Nebraska between the 43rd parallel north and the Keya Paha and Niobrara rivers (this land would be returned to Nebraska in 1882). The act creating the Dakota Territory also included provisions granting Nebraska small portions of Utah Territory and Washington Territory—present-day southwestern Wyoming, bounded by the 41st parallel north, the 43rd parallel north, and the Continental Divide. On March 3, 1863, Idaho Territory took everything west of 104°03' W (27° W of Washington, DC).

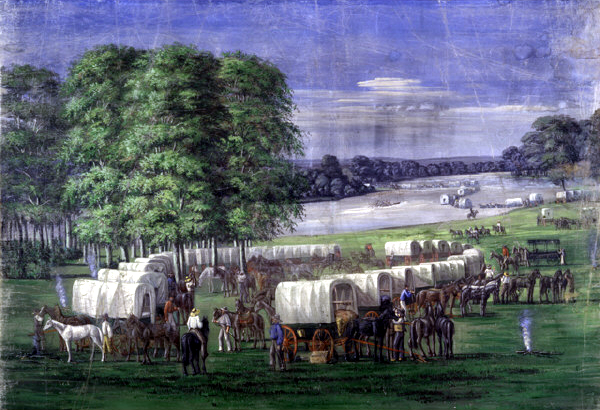
Wagon train headed to California

=== Civil War ===
Governor Alvin Saunders guided the territory during the American Civil War (1861–1865), as well as the first two years of the postbellum era. He worked with the territorial legislature to help define the borders of Nebraska, as well as to raise troops to serve in the Union Army. No battles were fought in the territory, but Nebraska raised three regiments of cavalry to help the war effort, and more than 3,000 Nebraskans served in the military.

=== Capital changes ===
The capital of the Nebraska Territory was at Omaha. During the 1850s there were numerous unsuccessful attempts to move the capital to other locations, including Florence and Plattsmouth. In the Scriptown corruption scheme, ruled illegal by the United States Supreme Court in the case of Baker v. Morton, local businessmen tried to secure land in the Omaha area to give away to legislators. The capital remained at Omaha until 1867 when Nebraska gained statehood, at which time the capital was moved to Lincoln, which was called Lancaster at that point.

== 1867–1900 ==
=== Statehood ===
A constitution for Nebraska was drawn up in 1866. There was some controversy over Nebraska's admission as a state, in view of a provision in the 1866 constitution restricting suffrage to White voters; eventually, on February 8, 1867, the United States Congress voted to admit Nebraska as a state provided that suffrage was not denied to non-white voters. The bill admitting Nebraska as a state was vetoed by President Andrew Johnson, but the veto was overridden by a supermajority in both Houses of Congress. Nebraska became the first–and to this day the only–state to be admitted to the Union by means of a veto override.

All land north of the Keya Paha River (which includes most of Boyd County and a smaller portion of neighboring Keya Paha County) was not originally part of Nebraska at the time of statehood, but was transferred from Dakota Territory in 1882.

== Railroads ==
=== Land sales ===
Railroads played a central role in the settlement of Nebraska. The land was good for farms and ranches, but without transportation would be impossible to raise commercial crops. The railroad companies had been given large land grants that were used to back the borrowings from New York and London that financed construction. They were anxious to locate settlers upon the land as soon as possible, ensuring there would be a steady outflow of farm products and a steady inflow of manufactured items purchased by the farmers. Railroads like Union Pacific also built towns that were needed to service the railroad itself, with dining halls for passengers, construction crews, repair shops and housing for train crews. These towns attracted cattle drives and cowboys.

In the 1870s and 1880s Civil War veterans and immigrants from Europe came by the thousands to take up land in Nebraska, with this migratory influx helping to rapidly extend westward the frontier line of settlement despite severe droughts, grasshopper plagues, economic distress, and other harsh conditions confronting the new settlers. Most of the great cattle ranches that had grown up near the ends of the trails from Texas gave way to farms, although the Sand Hills remained essentially a ranching country.

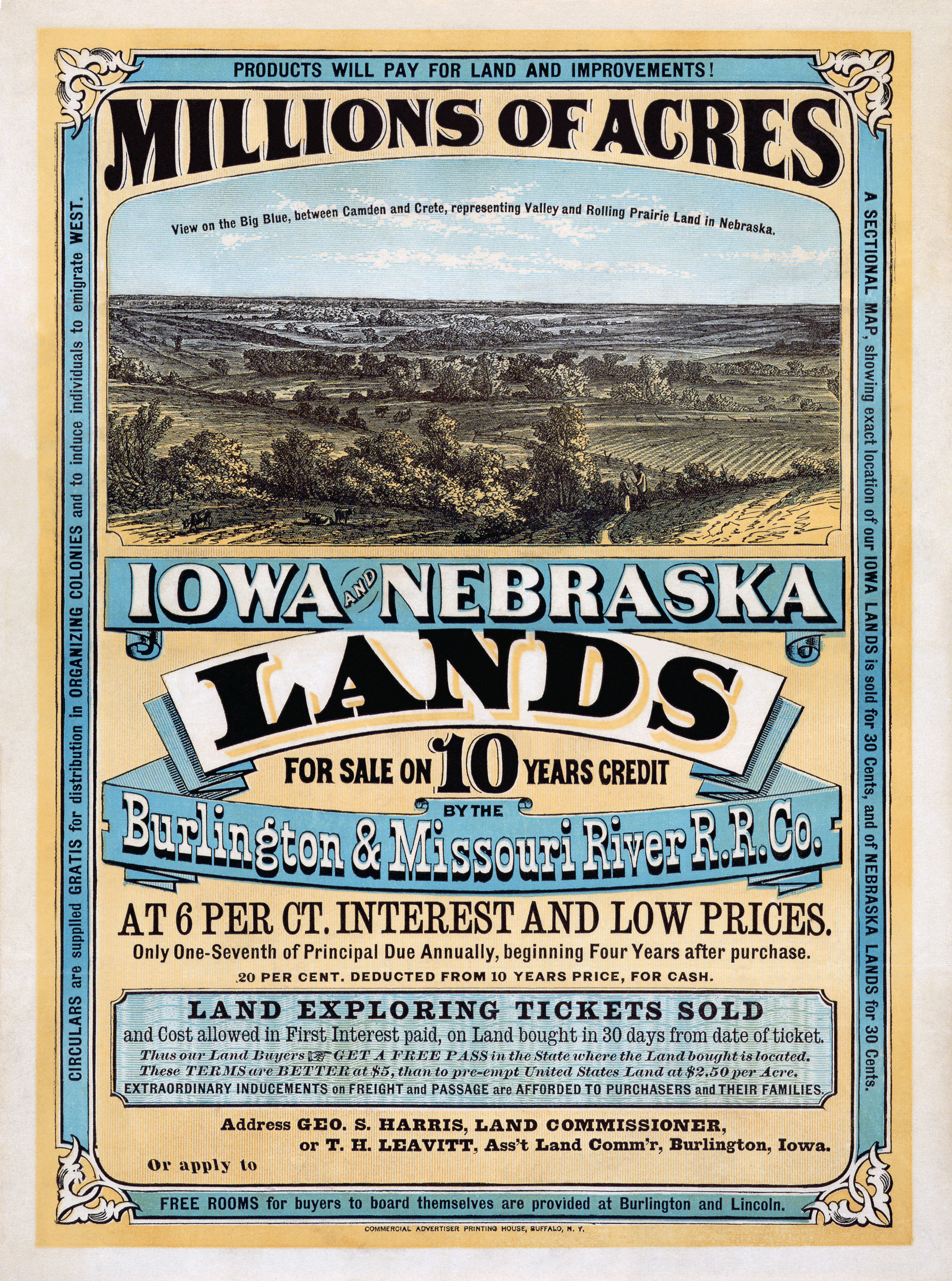
A land offer from the Burlington and Missouri River Railroad, 1872

The Union Pacific (UP) land grant gave it ownership of 12,800 acres per mile of finished track. The federal government kept every other section of land, rendering a surplus of 12,800 acres to sell or give away to homesteaders. The UP's goal was not to make a profit, but rather to build up a permanent clientele of farmers and townspeople who would form a solid basis for routine sales and purchases. The UP, like other major lines, opened sales offices in the East and in Europe to advertise their lands heavily far away and abroad, offering attractive package rates for migrant farmers to sell out and moved their entire family and necessary agricultural tools to the new destination. In 1870 the UP sold rich Nebraska farmland at five dollars an acre, with one fourth down and the remainder in three annual installments. It gave a 10 percent discount for cash. Farmers could also homestead land, getting it free from the federal government after five years, or even sooner by paying $1.50 an acre. Sales were improved by offering large blocks to ethnic colonies of European immigrants. Germans and Scandinavians, for example, could sell out their small farm back home and buy much larger farms for the same money. European ethnics comprised half of the population of Nebraska in the late 19th century. Married couples were usually the homesteaders, but single women were also eligible on their own.

A typical development program was that undertaken by the Burlington and Missouri River Railroad to promote settlement in southeastern Nebraska during 1870–80. The company participated enthusiastically in the boosterism campaigns that drew optimistic settlers to the state. The railroad offered farmers the opportunity to purchase land grant parcels on easy credit terms. Soil quality, topography, and distance from the railroad line generally determined railroad land prices. Immigrants and native-born migrants sometimes clustered in ethnic-based communities, but mostly the settlement of railroad land was by diverse mixtures of migrants. By deliberate campaigns, land sales, and a vast transportation network, the railroads facilitated and accelerated the peopling and development of the Great Plains, with railroads and water key to the potential for success in the Plains environment.

=== Populism ===
Populism was a farmers' movement of the early 1890s that emerged in a period of simultaneous crises in agriculture and politics. Farmers who attempted to raise corn and hogs in the dry regions of Nebraska faced economic disaster when drought unexpectedly occurred. When they sought relief through political means, they found the Republican Party complacent, resting on its past achievement of prosperity. The Democratic Party, meanwhile, was preoccupied with the prohibition issue. The farmers turn to radical politicians leading the Populist party, but it became so enmeshed in vehement battles that it accomplished little for the farmers. Omaha was the location of the 1892 convention that formed the Populist Party, with its aptly titled Omaha Platform written by "radical farmers" from throughout the Midwest.

== 20th century ==
=== Progressive Era ===
In 1900 Populism faded and the Republicans regained power in the state. In 1907 they enacted a number of progressive reform measures, including a direct primary law and a child labor act, in what was one of the most significant legislative sessions in Nebraska's history. Prohibition was of central importance in progressive politics before World War I. Many British-stock and Scandinavian Protestants advocated prohibition as a solution to social problems, while Catholics and German Lutherans attacked prohibition as a menace to their social customs and personal liberty. Prohibitionists supported direct democracy to enable voters to bypass the state legislature in lawmaking. The Republican Party championed the interests of the prohibitionists, while the Democratic Party represented ethnic group interests. After 1914 the issue shifted to the Germans' opposition to Woodrow Wilson's foreign policy. Then both Republicans and Democrats joined in reducing direct democracy in order to reduce German influence in state politics.

The political leader of the state's progressive movement was George W. Norris (1861 – 1944). He served five terms in the U.S. House of Representatives as a Republican from 1903 until 1913 and five terms in the U.S. Senate from 1913 until 1943, four terms as a Republican and the final term as an independent. In the 1930s he supported President Franklin Roosevelt, a Democrat, and the New Deal. Norris was defeated for reelection in 1942.

=== Land use ===
Since 1870 the average size of farms has steadily increased, whereas number of farms rapidly increased until about 1900, remained stable until about 1930, then rapidly decreased, as farmers bought out their neighbors and consolidated their holdings. Total area of cropland in Nebraska increased until the 1930s, but then showed long-term stability with large short-term fluctuations. Crop diversity was highest during 1955–1965, then slowly decreased; corn was always a dominant crop, but sorghum and oats were increasingly replaced by soybeans after the 1960s. Land-use changes were affected by farm policies and programs attempting to stabilize commodity supply and demand, reduce erosion, and reduce impacts to wildlife and ecological systems; technological advances (e.g., mechanization, seeds, pesticides, fertilizers); and population growth and redistribution.

=== Transportation ===
The 450 miles of the Lincoln Highway in Nebraska followed the route of the Platte River Valley, along the narrow corridor where pioneer trails, the Pony Express, and the main line of the Union Pacific Railroad ran. Construction began in 1913, as the road was promoted by a network of state and local boosters until it became U.S. Highway 30 and part of the nation's numbered highway system, with federal highway standards and subsidies. Before 1929 only sixty of its miles were hard surface in Nebraska. Its route was altered repeatedly, most importantly when Omaha was bypassed in 1930. The final section of the roadway was paved west of North Platte, Nebraska, in November 1935. The Lincoln Highway was planned as the most direct route across the country, but such a transcontinental highway was not realized until the 1970s, when Interstate 80 was built parallel to U.S. 30, giving the Lincoln Highway over to local traffic.

=== Retail stores ===
In the rural areas farmers and ranchers depended on general stores that had a limited stock and slow turnover; they made enough profit to stay in operation by selling at high prices. Prices were not marked on each item; instead the customer negotiated a price. Men did most of the shopping, since the main criterion was credit rather than quality of goods. Indeed, most customers shopped on credit, paying off the bill when crops or cattle were later sold; the owner's ability to judge credit worthiness was vital to his success.

In the cities consumers had much more choice, and bought their dry goods and supplies at locally owned department stores. They had a much wider selection of goods than in the country general stores; price tags that gave the actual selling price. The department stores provided a very limited credit, and set up attractive displays and, after 1900, window displays as well. Their clerks were experienced salesmen whose knowledge of the products appealed to the better educated middle-class housewives who did most of the shopping. The keys to success were a large variety of high-quality brand-name merchandise, high turnover, reasonable prices, and frequent special sales. The larger stores sent their buyers to Denver, Minneapolis, and Chicago once or twice a year to evaluate the newest trends in merchandising and stock up on the latest fashions. By the 1920s and 1930s, large mail-order houses such as Sears, Roebuck & Co. and Montgomery Ward provided serious competition, so the department stores relied even more on salesmanship, and close integration with the community.

Many entrepreneurs built stores, shops, and offices along Main Street. The most handsome ones used pre-formed, sheet iron facades, especially those manufactured by the Mesker Brothers of St. Louis. These neoclassical, stylized facades added sophistication to brick or wood-frame buildings throughout the state.

== Government ==
Senator Norris campaigned for the abolition of the bicameral system in the state legislature, arguing it was outdated, inefficient and unnecessarily expensive, and was based on the "inherently undemocratic" British House of Lords. In 1934, a state constitutional amendment was passed mandating a single-house legislature, and also introducing non-partisan elections (where members do not stand as members of political parties).

Government was heavily dominated by men, but there were a few niche roles for women. For example, Nellie Newmark (1888–1978) was the clerk of the District Court at Lincoln for a half-century, 1907–56. She gained a reputation for assisting judges and new attorneys assigned to the court.

=== Regulation of industry ===
With no cohesive federal protective legislation, Nebraska's Live Stock Sanitary Commission was created in 1885 to safeguard the public interest of Nebraska citizens through the regulation of the livestock industry. In 1887 the commission was reorganized into the Board of Live Stock Agents; it increased its collaborative efforts with the federal Bureau of Animal Industry. The Nebraska leadership led to more federal involvement in the livestock industry, including passage of the federal Meat Inspection Act of 1906. The Nebraska initiative exemplified the spirit of the Progressive Movement in the quest to impose scientific standards especially in areas related to public health.

== Women ==
=== Farm life ===
In Nebraska, very few single men attempted to operate a farm or ranch; farmers clearly understood the need for a hard-working wife, and numerous children, to handle the many chores, including child-rearing, feeding and clothing the family, managing the housework, feeding the hired hands, and, especially after the 1930s, handling the paperwork and financial details. During the early years of settlement in the late 19th century, farm women played an integral role in assuring family survival by working outdoors. After a generation or so, women increasingly left the fields, thus redefining their roles within the family. New conveniences such as sewing and washing machines encouraged women to turn to domestic roles. The scientific housekeeping movement, promoted across the land by the media and government extension agents, as well as county fairs which featured achievements in home cookery and canning, advice columns for women in the farm papers, and home economics courses in the schools.

Although the eastern image of farm life in the prairies emphasizes the isolation of the lonely farmer and farm life, in reality rural Nebraskans created a rich social life for themselves. They often sponsored activities that combined work, food, and entertainment such as barn raisings, corn huskings, quilting bees, Grange meeting, church activities, and school functions. The womenfolk organized shared meals and potluck events, as well as extended visits between families.

=== Teachers ===
There were few jobs available for young women awaiting marriage. Prairie schoolwomen, or teachers, played a vital role in modernizing the state. Some were from local families, perhaps with their father on the school board, and they took a job that kept money in the community. Others were well educated and more cosmopolitan, and looked at teaching as a career. They believed in universal education and social reform and were generally accepted as members of the community and as extended members of local families. Teachers were deeply involved in social and community activities. In the rural one-room schools, qualifications of the teachers were minimal and salaries were low: male teachers were paid about as much as a hired hand; women were paid less, about the same as those of a domestic servant. In the towns and especially in the cities, the teachers had some college experience, and were better paid. Those farm families that value the education of their children highly, often moved to town or bought a farm close to town, so their children could attend schools. Those few farm youth who attended high school often boarded in town.

== Great Depression ==
The Great Depression hit Nebraska hard, as grain and livestock prices fell in half, and unemployment was widespread in the cities. The collapse of the stock market in October 1929 did not result in great personal fortunes being lost. The greatest effect the crash had on Nebraska was the fall of farm prices because the state's economy was greatly dependent on their crop. Crop prices began to drop in the final quarter of the year and continued until December 1932 where they reached their lowest in state history. Governor Charles W. Bryan, a Democrat, was at first unwilling to request aid from the national government, but when the Federal Emergency Relief Act became law in 1933 Nebraska took part. Rowland Haynes, the state's emergency relief director, was the major force in implementing such national New Deal relief programs as the Federal Emergency Relief Administration (FERA) and the Civil Works Administration. Roy Cochran, a Democrat who became governor in 1935, sought federal assistance and placed Nebraska among the first American states to adopt a social security law. The enduring impact of FERA and social security in Nebraska was to shift responsibility for social welfare from counties to the state, which henceforth accepted federal funding and guidelines. The change in state and national relations may have been the most important legacy of these New Deal programs in Nebraska.

== World War II ==
Nebraska fully mobilized its labor and economic resources when the federal call to action came at America's entrance into World War II. Besides many young Nebraskan men serving overseas during the war, food production was expanded and munitions plants, such as the Nebraska Ordnance Plant, were built. The Cornhusker Ordnance Plant (COP) in Grand Island, produced its first bombs in November 1942. At its peak it employed 4,200 workers, over 40% of whom were "Women Ordnance Workers" or "WOW's." The WOW's were a major reason that the Quaker Oats Company, which managed the plant, started one of the nation's earliest corporate child care programs. For Grand Island, the plant brought good wages, high retail sales, severe housing shortages, and an end to Depression-level unemployment. The plant became a major social force, demonstrated by its sponsoring of such wide-ranging community groups as local sporting teams and Boy Scouts troops. The city adjusted to the plant's closing in August 1945 with surprising ease. During the Korean and Vietnam conflicts COP resumed production, the ordnance plant finally shutting down in 1973.

During the Second World War Nebraska was home to several prisoner of war camps. Scottsbluff, Fort Robinson, and Camp Atlanta (outside Holdrege) were the main camps. There were many smaller satellite camps at Alma, Bayard, Bertrand, Bridgeport, Elwood, Fort Crook, Franklin, Grand Island, Hastings, Hebron, Indianola, Kearney, Lexington, Lyman, Mitchell, Morrill, Ogallala, Palisade, Sidney, and Weeping Water. Fort Omaha housed Italian POWs. Altogether there were 23 large and small camps scattered across the state. In addition, several U.S. Army Airfields were constructed at various locations across the state.

== Postwar ==
After the war, conservative Republicans held most of the state major offices. A progressive breakthrough came during the administration of Republican Governor Norbert Tiemann (1967–1971) who successfully pushed for a number of major changes. A new revenue act included a sales tax and an income tax, replacing the state property tax and other taxes. The Municipal University of Omaha joined the state University of Nebraska system as the University of Nebraska Omaha. A new department of economic development was created as well as a state personnel office. State economic initiatives paved the way for the bond indebted financing of highway and sewage treatment plant construction projects. Improvement of state mental health facilities and fair housing practices were also enacted, along with the first minimum wage law and new of open-housing legislation.

The nationwide farm crisis of the 1980s hit the state hard with a wave of farm foreclosures. On the positive side, Omaha's geographic centrality in the American Interstate Highway System and large well-educated population made the city an attractive place for many small manufacturing concerns to set up shop. By the early 1990s, Omaha had become a major center of the telecommunications industry, which surpassed meat-packing in terms of employment. After 2000, however, Omaha's call centers faced stiff competition from outsourced foreign operators in India and other developing nations.

On December 5, 2007, the state's deadliest mass shooting occurred at Westroads Mall in Omaha. Nine people died and five were injured.

=== Culture ===
Following World War II, and especially after the 1960s, fine arts projects flourished in Nebraska. During this period existing orchestras were expanded and new ones chartered while local museums and art galleries sprung up in communities across the state, this renaissance occurring in no small part due to the energetic support of Nebraska's higher education institutions and the National Endowment for the Humanities funded Nebraska Arts Council and Nebraska Humanities Council.

=== Hispanics ===
Hispanic Americans have lived in the region since before Nebraska became a state in 1867, but large scale migration didn't began until the 1980s and 1990s. In 1972, Nebraska was the first state to establish a statutory agency devoted to the needs of Hispanics, a group which then numbered about 30,000. Mexicans generally entered low skilled, low-wage occupations in the hospitality, manufacturing, food processing, and agricultural industries. One example was the small city of Schuyler in Colfax County, an area previously dominated by German and Czech ethnics who settled there around the turn of the last century. Another case study is Lexington, seat of Dawson County. The Hispanic population soared tenfold between 1990 and 2000, from just over 400 to about 4,000, and the city's overall population grew from 6,600 to over 10,000. The positive economic trends in the 1990s contrasted sharply with the 1980s, when Dawson County's population and overall employment rate declined rapidly. Fears that immigration would depress wages and raise unemployment rates across the state were unfounded. Indeed, just the reverse happened. The Hispanic migration wave increased both labor supply and demand, businessmen discovering that they could profitably expand their operations in Douglas County with a fresh supply of willing labor. The net result of the growing Hispanic population in Nebraska was an upsurge in employment, average wages, and economic prosperity for all sectors.

== See also ==
- History of African Americans in Nebraska
- Great Plains
- History of Lincoln, Nebraska
- History of Omaha
- History of North Omaha
- History of the Midwestern United States
- Forts in Nebraska
- List of historic bridges in Nebraska
- Landmarks of the Nebraska Territory
- Native American tribes in Nebraska
- Douglas County Historical Society
- Washington County Historical Association
- Nebraska State Historical Society

== Bibliography ==
=== Surveys ===
- The Encyclopedia of Nebraska (1999) [encyclopediaofne0000unse_p8n1 online]
- Andreas, Alfred T. History of the State of Nebraska (1882), a rich mine of information online edition
- Creigh, Dorothy Weyer (1977). Nebraska : a Bicentennial history. New York: Norton. ISBN 0-393-05598-1. OCLC 2896255.
- Hickey, Donald R.; Wunder, Susan A.; Wunder, John R. (2007). Nebraska Moments. Lincoln: University of Nebraska Press. ISBN 978-0-8032-1572-6. OCLC 182559816.
- Luebke, Frederick C. Nebraska: An Illustrated History (1995)
- Morton, J. Sterling, ed. Illustrated History of Nebraska: A History of Nebraska from the Earliest Explorations of the Trans-Mississippi Region. 3 vols. (1905–13) online free vol 1
- Naugle, Ronald C., John J. Montag, and James C. Olson. History of Nebraska (4th ed. University of Nebraska Press, 2015). 568 pp. online review
  - older editions: Olson, James C, and Ronald C. Naugle. History of Nebraska (3rd ed. University of Nebraska Press, 1997) 506pp
- Sheldon, Addison Erwin. Nebraska: The Land and the People. (3 vols. 1931). old detailed narrative, with biographies
- Wishart, David J. Encyclopedia of the Great Plains (2004) excerpt

=== Politics ===
- Barnhart John D. "Rainfall and the Populist Party in Nebraska." American Political Science Review 19 (1925): 527–40. in JSTOR
- Berens; Charlyne. Chuck Hagel: Moving Forward (U. of Nebraska Press, 2006) GOP senator 1997–2008
- Cherny, Robert W. Populism, Progressivism and the Transformation of Nebraska Politics, 1885–1915 (University of Nebraska Press, 1981)
- Folsom, Burton W. "Tinkerers, tipplers, and traitors: ethnicity and democratic reform in Nebraska during the Progressive era." Pacific Historical Review 50.1 (1981): 53–75. online
- Folsom, Burton W Jr. No More Free Markets or Free Beer: The Progressive Era in Nebraska, 1900–1924 (1999).
- Lowitt Richard. George W. Norris (3 vols. 1963–75), emphasis on national role
- Luebke Frederick C. Immigrants and Politics: The Germans of Nebraska, 1880–1900 (University of Nebraska Press, 1969).
- Olson James C. J. Sterling Morton (U. of Nebraska Press, 1942).
- Parsons Stanley B Jr. The Populist Context: Rural versus Urban Power on a Great Plains Frontier (Greenwood Press, 1973).
- Pederson James F, and Kenneth D. Wald. Shall the People Rule? A History of the Democratic Party in Nebraska Politics, 1854–1972 (Lincoln: Jacob North, 1972).
- Potter, James E. Standing Firmly by the Flag: Nebraska Territory and the Civil War, 1861–1867 (University of Nebraska Press, 2012) 375 pp.

=== Social and economic history ===
- Bogue, Allen G. Money at Interest: The Farm Mortgage on the Middle Border (Cornell University Press, 1955)
- Brunner Edmund de S. Immigrant Farmers and Their Children (1929), sociological study.
- Combs, Barry B. "The Union Pacific Railroad and the Early Settlement of Nebraska." Nebraska History 50#1 (1969): 1-26.
- Dick, Everett. The Sod-House Frontier: 1854–1890 (1937), on town and farm life before 1900. online free to borrow
- Dick, Everett. Vanguards of the frontier : a social history of the northern plains and Rocky Mountains from the fur traders to the sod busters (1941) online free to borrow
- Fink, Deborah. Agrarian Women: Wives and Mothers in Rural Nebraska, 1880–1940 (1992)
- Hurt, R. Douglas. The Great Plains During World War II (2008), 524pp
- Meyering; Sheryl L. Understanding O Pioneers! and My Antonia: A Student Casebook to Issues, Sources, and Historical Documents (Greenwood Press, 2002)
- Pound, Louise. Nebraska Folklore (1913) (reprint University of Nebraska Press, 2006)

=== Geography and environment ===
- Archer, J. Clark, et al. Atlas of Nebraska. (University of Nebraska Press, 2017). Pp. xxii+ 214, color maps, illustrations, photographs, charts, graphs, bibliography. online review
- Aucoin; James. Water in Nebraska: Use, Politics, Policies (University of Nebraska Press, 1984)
- Lavin, Stephen J. et al. Atlas of the Great Plains (University of Nebraska Press, 2011) excerpt
- Lonsdale, Richard E. Economic Atlas of Nebraska (1977)
- Williams, James H, and Doug Murfield. Agricultural Atlas of Nebraska (1977)
