= Courts of Nebraska =

Courts of Nebraska include:

State courts of Nebraska

- Nebraska Supreme Court
  - Nebraska Court of Appeals
    - Nebraska District Courts (12 districts)
      - Nebraska County Courts (93 courts, one for each county)
      - Nebraska Juvenile Courts (3 courts, in Douglas, Lancaster, and Sarpy counties)
      - Nebraska Problem-Solving Courts (35 courts statewide)
    - Nebraska Workers' Compensation Court

Federal courts located in Nebraska

- United States District Court for the District of Nebraska

== See also ==
- Nebraska Attorney General
