= Senator Pirsch =

Senator Pirsch may refer to:

- Carol McBride Pirsch (born 1936), Nebraska Legislature, 1979–1997
- Pete Pirsch (born 1969), Nebraska Legislature, 2007–2015
