= Senator Savage =

Senator Savage may refer to:

- Christine Savage (1931–2023), Maine State Senate
- John Savage (Nebraska politician) (1905–1989), Nebraska State Senate
- John Houston Savage (1815–1904), Tennessee State Senate
