= James Monen =

American politician (1933–2011)

Member of the Nebraska Legislature from the 4th district
- In office January 4, 1994 – January 4, 1995
- Preceded by: Thomas Horgan
- Succeeded by: Kermit Brashear

Judge of the Nebraska Workers' Compensation Court
- In office September 1, 1977 – September 1, 1993
- Appointed by: J. James Exon
- Preceded by: Richard S. Wiles
- Succeeded by: Joseph Steven Ramirez

Personal details
- Born: May 6, 1933
- Died: August 18, 2011 (aged 78) Omaha, Nebraska
- Party: Democratic
- Spouse: Maureen
- Children: 6 (Emily, Agnes, James Jr., Michaela, Kate, Sheila)
- Education: Georgetown University (B.A.); Creighton University School of Law (J.D.)
- Occupation: Attorney

James Philip "Jim" Monen, Sr. (May 6, 1933 – August 18, 2011) was a Democratic politician and judge from Nebraska who served as a member of the Nebraska Legislature from the 4th district from 1994 to 1995 and as a judge of the Nebraska Workers' Compensation Court from 1977 to 1993.

== Early career ==
Monen was born in 1933, and graduated from Creighton Preparatory School in Omaha, Nebraska. He then attended Georgetown University and the Creighton University School of Law. Monen worked as a prosecutor and as an attorney in private practice in Omaha and Norfolk.

== Workers' Compensation Court ==
In 1977, following the retirement of Judge Richard S. Wiles, Governor J. James Exon appointed Monen to the Nebraska Workers' Compensation Court, and he was sworn in on September 1, 1977. He faced his first retention election in 1980, and was retained by voters with 76 percent of the vote. Monen was retained with 74 percent of the vote in 1986, and 69 percent in 1992.

Monen announced that he would retire effective September 1, 1993, noting that he wanted to "do something else that would be worthwhile to me and the community."

== Nebraska Legislature ==
In 1993, State Senator Thomas Horgan, a Democrat who represented the 4th district, which was based in West Omaha, announced that he would retire to take an out-of-state job. Governor Ben Nelson appointed Monen to serve out the remaining year of Horgan's term. Monen was sworn in on January 4, 1994, and ran for a full term that year.

Monen was challenged by Kermit Brashear, the former chairman of the Nebraska Republican Party. Brashear narrowly placed first in the primary election, winning 53 percent of the vote to Monen's 47 percent, and the two advanced to the general election. Brashear ultimately defeated Monen by a wide margin, winning 59–41 percent.

== Death ==
Monen died on August 18, 2011.
