= Deborah Suttle =

American politician (born 1945)

Deborah S. Suttle

Member of the Nebraska Legislature from the 10th district
- In office January 8, 1997 – January 8, 2003
- Preceded by: Carol McBride Pirsch
- Succeeded by: Mike Friend

Personal details
- Born: December 28, 1945 (age 80) Charleston, West Virginia
- Party: Democratic
- Spouse: Jim Suttle
- Education: West Virginia University (B.S.)
- Occupation: Nurse

Deborah "Deb" Suttle (née Sindy; born December 28, 1945) is a Democratic politician from the state of Nebraska who served as a member of the Nebraska Legislature from 1997 to 2003 from the 10th district. She is married to former Omaha Mayor Jim Suttle.

== Early career ==
Deborah Sindy was in Charleston, West Virginia, and attended West Virginia University, graduating with her bachelor's degree in nursing in 1967. She married Jim Suttle in 1966, and they relocated to Omaha, Nebraska. Suttle served as president of the League of Women Voters for Greater Omaha from 1991 to 1993.

== Nebraska Legislature ==
In 1994, Suttle challenged State Senator Carol McBride Pirsch for re-election, arguing that Pirsch voted against the interests of Omaha. In the primary election, Pirsch placed first by a wide margin, receiving 63 percent of the vote to Suttle's 37 percent. While both candidates campaigned as moderates in the general election, Pirsch argued that Suttle had changed her positions on the issues, while Suttle argued that Pirsch had been absent from the legislature. Ultimately, Pirsch defeated Suttle with 55 percent of the vote.

Pirsch did not end up serving out her full term, however, and in 1996, was elected to the Douglas County Commission, and resigned from the legislature. Governor Ben Nelson appointed Suttle to serve out the remainder of Pirsch's term. Suttle ran for a full term in 1998, and was challenged by Republican R.L. Kerrigan, a real estate businessman. In the primary election, Suttle placed first over Kerrigan, winning 56 percent of the vote to his 43 percent. In the general election, Suttle narrowly won re-election, receiving 53 percent of the vote to Kerrigan's 47 percent.

Suttle ran for a second full term in 2002, and was opposed by journalist Mike Friend, a Republican, who had worked as a journalist, editor, and technical writer. In the primary election, Suttle narrowly placed first over Friend, but was narrowly defeated in the general election, winning 49 percent of the vote to Friend's 51 percent.
