= Mike Friend =

American politician

Michael "Mike" Friend

Member of the Nebraska Legislature from the 10th district
- In office January 8, 2003 – August 16, 2009
- Preceded by: Deborah Suttle
- Succeeded by: Bob Krist

Personal details
- Born: October 4, 1961 (age 65) Omaha, Nebraska
- Party: Republican
- Occupation: Nebraska Director, Americans for Prosperity

Michael Friend (born October 4, 1961) is a politician from the U.S. state of Nebraska who currently serves as a member of the Douglas County Commission. He represented an Omaha district in the Nebraska Legislature, and later became and the first Director of Nebraska's Office of Violence Prevention.

Friend was born in Omaha, and graduated from Millard Senior High School in 1980. He then attended Kearney State College from 1980 to 1982 and Creighton University in journalism, graduated in 1985 but studied law for an extra year. In 2002, Friend was elected to represent the 10th Legislative District in the Nebraska Legislature. He was re-elected in 2006 with over 76% of the vote. He sat on the General Affairs, Revenue, and Legislative Performance Audit Committees, and chaired the Urban Affairs Committee.

In 2006, Nebraska lawmakers passed a bill sponsored by Friend that restricts picketing and protesting at funerals. The law was designed to prohibit picketing a funeral within 300 feet of a cemetery, mortuary or church between one hour before and two hours following an event. The impetus for the legislation was a group of protesters who made a habit of picketing military funerals, as a form of protest against the United States.

In August 2009, Friend resigned from the Legislature after governor Dave Heineman appointed him Director of the Office of Violence Prevention. The office holds the responsibility of overseeing grants to combat community violence. Friend left the Office of Violence Prevention in 2011.

== Sources ==
1. "Omaha Senator Mike Friend Takes State Job". Sen. Mike Friend.
2. "Mike Friend Gets Crime-Prevention Post". Sen. Mike Friend.
3. "Nebraska Unicameral Legislature". Sen. Mike Friend.
4. "Picketing at funerals restricted by bill". Sen. Mike Friend.
