= Robert Hilkemann =

American politician

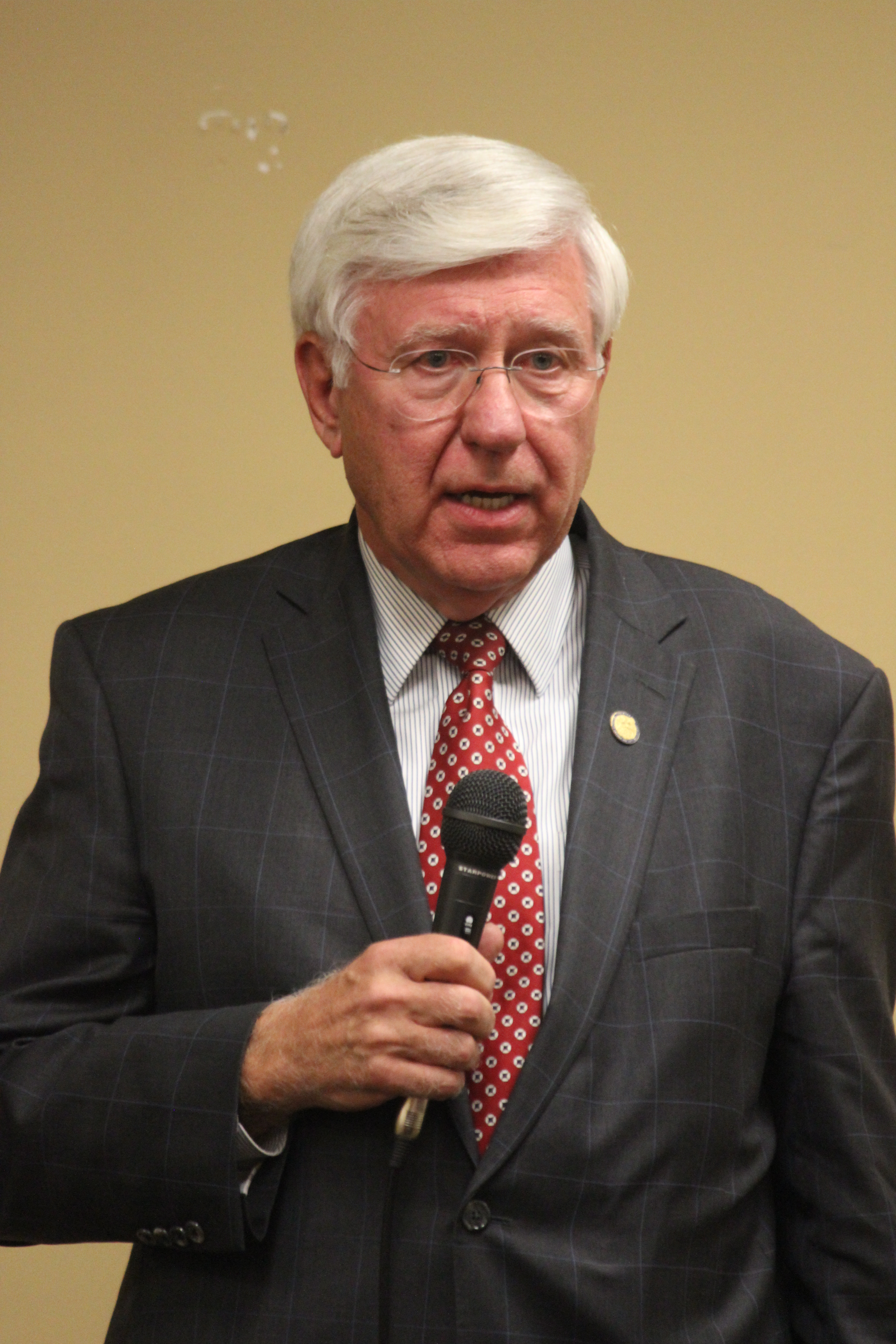
- Robert Hilkemann

Member of the Nebraska Legislature from the 4th district
- In office January 7, 2015 – January 4, 2023
- Preceded by: Pete Pirsch
- Succeeded by: Brad von Gillern

Personal details
- Born: November 23, 1947 (age 78) Norfolk, Nebraska, U.S.
- Party: Republican
- Education: Nebraska Wesleyan University (BS); Illinois College of Podiatric Medicine (DPM)
- Occupation: Retired podiatrist

Robert "Bob" Hilkemann (born November 23, 1947) is a politician from the U.S. state of Nebraska. In 2014, he was elected to the Nebraska Legislature, representing an Omaha district.

== Early life and professional career ==
Hilkemann was born in Norfolk, Nebraska. He grew up near Randolph, Nebraska, and graduated from Randolph Public High School in 1965. In 1969, he obtained a Bachelor of Science in biology from Nebraska Wesleyan University where he became a member of Phi Kappa Tau Fraternity. From 1969 to 1972, he worked as a high-school science teacher and football coach in Table Rock, Nebraska. In 1970, he married Julie Beth Bryngelson and they had three children, Todd, Elizabeth, and Sarah.

Wishing to pursue a career in podiatry, Hilkemann attended the Illinois College of Podiatric Medicine, receiving his Doctor of Podiatric Medicine in 1976. He returned to Nebraska where he began practice in Omaha in 1977. In 1984, he founded the Foot and Ankle Center of Nebraska. He retired from practice in 2013.

== Legislature ==
Upon launching his practice in 1977, Hilkemann had found Nebraska's laws concerning medical practice "antiquated and overly restrictive". He brought three initiatives to the Nebraska Legislature, where he worked with Nebraska senators to amend statute. In the 1980s, he served on the Nebraska State Board of Health, including two years as chairman.

=== 2014 election ===
Upon his retirement from practice, Hilkemann decided to run for a seat in the Legislature in District 4, located in northwest Omaha. Under Nebraska's term-limits law, incumbent Pete Pirsch, a Republican, was ineligible to run for re-election. Five candidates sought to succeed him: Hilkemann, a Republican; Matt Butler, an Omaha entrepreneur and a Republican, who had unsuccessfully run for lieutenant governor in 1998; Stacy Ryan, a Republican described as a "judicial reform activist"; Steve Howard, an Omaha attorney and a Democrat; and Nicholas Pestello, a 23-year-old independent, whose principal issue was the decriminalization of marijuana.

In the nonpartisan primary election, Hilkemann led, with 2357 of the 6133 votes cast, or 38.4% of the total. Ryan came in second, with 1513 votes, or 24.7%. Howard and Butler nearly tied for third, with 1070 and 1068 votes respectively (17.4%); and Pestello received 125 votes, or 2.0%.

Hilkemann and Ryan described themselves as conservative and agreed on the same policies, though their stances differed on the policy of capital punishment. Hilkemann declared that it was "still necessary for the more heinous crimes," while Ryan stated, "I do not support the death penalty."

Hilkemann won, with 6698 of the 11,681 votes cast, or 57.3% of the total. Ryan received 4983 votes, or 42.7%.

=== Legislative tenure ===
==== 2015 session ====
In the 2015 session of the legislature, Hilkemann was appointed as vice-chairman of the Appropriations Committee.

Among the most significant actions taken by the Legislature in its 2015 session were three bills that passed over vetoes by governor Pete Ricketts. LB268 repealed the state's death penalty; Hilkemann voted in favor of the death-penalty repeal, and to override Ricketts's veto of the measure. LB623 reversed the state's previous policy of denying driver's licenses to people who were living illegally in the United States after being brought to the country as children, and who had been granted exemption from deportation under the Barack Obama administration's Deferred Action for Childhood Arrivals (DACA) program; Hilkemann abstained in the vote to pass LB623, and voted to sustain the gubernatorial veto. LB610 increased the tax on gasoline to pay for repairs to roads and bridges; Hilkemann abstained in the vote on the gas-tax increase, then voted to sustain the veto.
