= Larry Stoney =

American politician

Member of the Nebraska Legislature from the 4th district
- In office January 8, 1975 – January 5, 1983
- Preceded by: Richard Fellman
- Succeeded by: Gary Hannibal

Personal details
- Born: November 12, 1937 (age 88) Omaha, Nebraska
- Party: Republican
- Spouse: Jan Stoney
- Children: 1 (Todd)
- Education: University of Omaha
- Occupation: Insurance executive

Larry D. Stoney (born November 12, 1937) is a Republican politician and insurance company executive from Nebraska who served as a member of the Nebraska Legislature from the 4th district from 1975 to 1983.

== Early life ==
Stoney was born in Omaha, Nebraska, in 1937. He graduated from Omaha Benson High School in 1955, and from the University of Omaha in 1964. Stoney worked for Mutual of Omaha, and was the assistant director of the company's special service department.

== Nebraska Senate ==
In 1974, Stoney ran to succeed State Senator Richard Fellman in the Omaha-based 4th district. He faced a crowded field of candidates, including John Hendriks, a businessman; Paul Landow, an employee at a supply company; M. Thomas Perkins, the director of a drug abuse treatment center; Barbara Hosford, an attorney; and Carlin Whitesell, an engineer. Stoney placed first in the primary, winning 29 percent of the vote, and advanced to the general election with Whitesell, who placed second with 26 percent of the vote. Stoney ultimately defeated Whitesell in the general election, winning 59–41 percent.

Stoney ran for re-election in 1978. He was challenged by lobbyist Carol Elrod, whose husband, Don Elrod, previously served in the legislature. In the primary election, Stoney placed first by a wide margin, winning 79 percent of the vote to her 21 percent. Stoney defeated Elrod in the general election, winning his second term, 61–39 percent.

In 1982, Stoney declined to seek re-election to a third term.

== Post-legislative career ==
Following his departure from the legislature, Stoney was appointed a vice president at Mutual of Omaha. His wife, Jan Stoney, became the president of Northwestern Bell, and was the 1994 Republican nominee for U.S. Senate against Democratic Senator Bob Kerrey. They retired to Phoenix, Arizona.
