= Monen (surname) =

Monen is a surname. Notable people with this surname include:

- James Monen (1933–2011), American politician and judge from Nebraska
- Pol Monen (born 1994), Spanish actor
