= Kermit Brashear =

American politician and lawyer

Speaker of the Nebraska Legislature
- In office January 5, 2005 – January 3, 2007
- Preceded by: Curt Bromm
- Succeeded by: Mike Flood

Member of the Nebraska Legislature from the 4th district
- In office January 4, 1995 – January 3, 2007
- Preceded by: James Monen
- Succeeded by: Pete Pirsch

Personal details
- Born: March 16, 1944 (age 82) Crawford, Nebraska, U.S.
- Party: Republican
- Education: University of Nebraska–Lincoln

Kermit Brashear (born March 16, 1944) is an American politician and lawyer from Omaha, Nebraska. He was a member of the unicameral Nebraska Legislature from 1995 to 2007, and he served as its speaker from 2005 to 2007.

== Personal life ==
Brashear was born in Crawford, Nebraska. He graduated from Crawford High School in 1962, University of Nebraska in 1966 and the University of Nebraska College of Law in 1969. He received an honorary doctorate from Concordia University Nebraska (LL.D., h.c.) in 1983. Now retired, he was admitted to practice law in Nebraska, Colorado, and Texas. He was a partner in Nelson & Harding (1969-1988), Heron, Burchette, Ruckert & Rothwell (1989), Brashear & Ginn (1990-2004) and Brashear LLP (2004-2017), all in Omaha, Nebraska.

He was a member of the Board of Directors of The Lutheran Church—Missouri Synod. In 2009-10 he attracted attention and controversy for his role in selling KFUO-FM, the LCMS-owned classical music station in St. Louis, Missouri; as a member of the board, he pushed for selling the station and his law firm handled all the negotiations and closing of the sale.

== State Legislature ==
He was elected in 1994 to represent the 4th Legislative District in the Nebraska Legislature and reelected in 1998 and 2002. He served as Chairman of the Judiciary Committee from 1997 to 2005 and served at various times on the Appropriations, Banking, Commerce & Insurance, and Education Committees, as well as on the Committee on Committees. He was also an ex officio member of the rules committee and a nonvoting member of the Intergovernmental Cooperation committee because of his status as Speaker. Because Nebraska voters passed Initiative Measure 415 in 2001 limiting state senators to two terms after 2001, he was unable run for reelection in 2006. Pete Pirsch replaced him as the 4th District's state senator after the 2006 legislative election.
