= Gary Hannibal =

American politician (born 1943)

Gary E. Hannibal

Member of the Nebraska Legislature from the 4th district
- In office January 5, 1983 – January 9, 1991
- Preceded by: Larry Stoney
- Succeeded by: Thomas Horgan

Personal details
- Born: May 5, 1943 (age 83) Omaha, Nebraska
- Party: Republican
- Spouse: Mary Lou
- Children: 4
- Education: University of Omaha (B.A.)
- Occupation: Real estate broker

Gary E. Hannibal (born May 5, 1943) is a Republican politician from Nebraska who served as a member of the Nebraska Legislature from the 4th district from 1983 to 1991.

== Early career ==
Hannibal was born in Omaha, Nebraska, and graduated from Westside High School. He attended the University of Omaha, receiving his bachelor's degree in economics in 1970. Hannibal established Hannibal Construction, Inc., in 1965, and began working as a real estate broker in 1972. He served on the board of directors of the National Association of Home Builders from 1974 to 1982, and as president of the Metropolitan Omaha Builders Association in 1982.

== Nebraska Legislature ==
In 1982, State Senator Larry Stoney declined to seek re-election to a third term, and Hannibal ran to succeed him in the 4th district, which was based in West Omaha. In the nonaprtisan primary, he faced Wanda Christie, an antique dealer; Dennis Hanley, a teacher; Maureen Monen, a member of the state Natural Resources Commission; Bev Laing, an improvement district trustee; and Al Pattavina, the former city director of public safety, In the primary, Hannibal placed first, winning 37 percent of the vote to Laing's 24 percent. Though the race was formally nonpartisan, both Hannibal and Laing were Republicans. Hannibal ultimately defeated Laing by a narrow margin, winning 53–47 percent.

Hannibal ran for re-election to a second term in 1986. Homebuilder Denny Henson, a Republican, challenged Hannibal for re-election. In the primary, Hannibal placed first over Henson, winning 60 percent. However, in the general election, Hannibal only won re-election by a narrow margin, receiving 53 percent of the vote to Henson's 47 percent.

In 1990, Hannibal declined to seek re-election to a third term, instead deciding to return to his real estate business.
