= Panorama Point =

Highest point in Nebraska

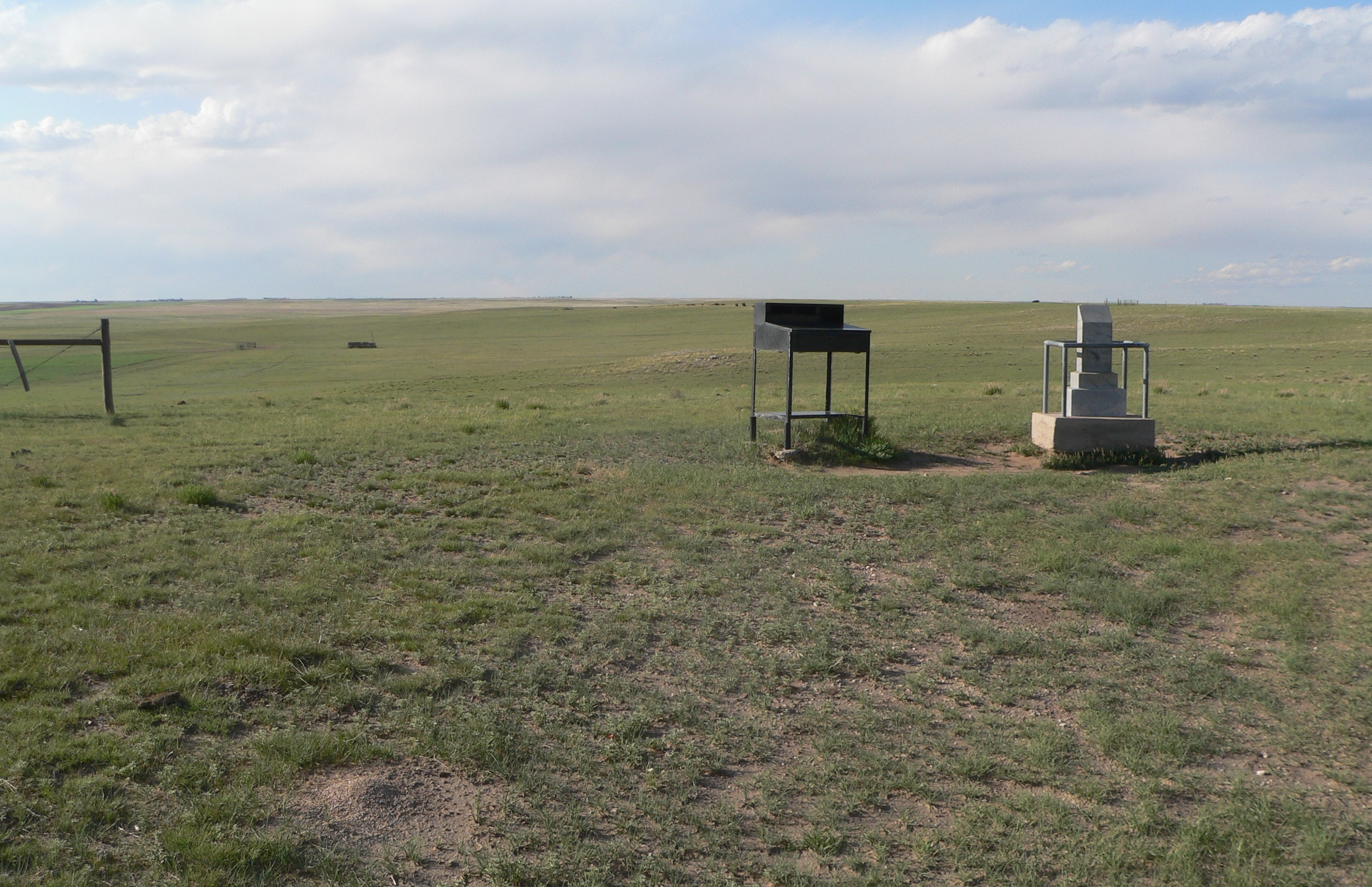
- Register (right of center) and monument (right) at Panorama Point

Highest point
- Elevation: 5,429 ft (1,655 m) NAVD 88
- Prominence: 26 ft (7.9 m)
- Listing: U.S. state high point 20th
- Coordinates: 41°00′38″N 104°01′47″W

Geography
- Location within Nebraska
- Location: Kimball County, Nebraska, United States

Panorama Point is the highest natural point in Nebraska, at an elevation of 5,429 feet (1,655 m) above sea level. It is located in southwestern Kimball County, near the point where Nebraska and Wyoming meet on Colorado's northern boundary. Despite its name and elevation, Panorama Point is neither a mountain nor a hill; it is merely a low rise on the High Plains. A stone marker, giving the elevation at 5,424 feet (1,653 m), and a guest register are located at the summit of the drive. From the point one can see the nearby state corner marker, and a vast plains landscape with the Rocky Mountains in the western distance. Panorama Point is located on the High Point Bison Ranch, which permits visitors to drive to the site as long as they take care to avoid the ranging bison and pay an entrance fee.

== See also ==
- List of U.S. states by elevation
