= Thomas Horgan =

American politician

Member of the Nebraska Legislature from the 4th district
- In office January 9, 1991 – January 3, 1994
- Preceded by: Gary Hannibal
- Succeeded by: James Monen

Personal details
- Born: March 2, 1953 (age 73) Sioux City, Iowa
- Party: Democratic
- Spouse: Suzanne M. Elgin (m. 1981)
- Children: 5 (Kathryn, Andrew, Timothy, Jennifer, Michael)
- Education: Morningside College (B.A.); University of Nebraska at Omaha (M.P.A.)
- Occupation: Higher education administrator

Thomas R. Horgan (born March 2, 1953) is a Democratic politician and higher education administrator who served as a member of the Nebraska Legislature from the 4th district from 1991 to 1994, and as president of the New Hampshire College and University Council from 1994 until his retirement in 2017.

== Early life ==
Horgan was born in Sioux City, Iowa, in 1953. He attended Morningside College, graduating with a bachelor's degree in 1975, and the University of Nebraska at Omaha, receiving his masters in public administration in 1980.

In 1984, Horgan ran for the Omaha School Board, challenging incumbent member Mary Muff in Subdistrict 10. Muff dropped out of the race, but did so too late to remove her name from the ballot, and narrowly placed second to Horgan in the primary election. Though Muff considered resuming her campaign, she ultimately declined to do so, and Horgan was elected unopposed. Horgan resigned from the board in 1986 when he was transferred to Houston by his employer, Enron.

Horgan returned to Omaha in 1987 upon his appointment as president of the Nebraska Independent College Foundation.

== Nebraska Legislature ==
In 1990, Horgan ran for the Nebraska Legislature from the West Omaha-based 4th district. Incumbent State Senator Gary Hannibal declined to seek re-election to a third term, and Horgan faced businessman Matt Butler, real estate broker Denny Henson, and attorney Jim Vitek in the nonpartisan primary. Horgan placed second in the primary, winning 28 percent of the vote to Henson's 42 percent, and they advanced to the general election. Horgan ultimately defeated Henson with 56 percent of the vote.

While a member of the legislature, Horgan successfully sponsored the state's mandatory seat-belt law.

== New Hampshire College and University Council ==
Horgan resigned, effective January 3, 1994, to become the executive director of the New Hampshire College and University Council. Horgan retired from the NHCUC on June 30, 2017.
