= Pete Pirsch =

American politician

Member of the Nebraska Legislature from the 4th district
- In office 2007–2015
- Preceded by: Kermit Brashear
- Succeeded by: Robert Hilkemann

Personal details
- Born: Omaha, Nebraska, U.S.
- Party: Republican
- Relations: Carol McBride Pirsch (mother)
- Education: University of Virginia (BA) University of Nebraska–Lincoln (JD) University of Nebraska Omaha (MBA)
- Occupation: Lawyer

Peter Allen "Pete" Pirsch (born October 28, 1969) is a politician from the state of Nebraska in the Midwestern United States. He was born in Omaha, Nebraska. His mother, Carol McBride Pirsch, was a member of the Nebraska Legislature, representing the 10th district from 1979 to 1997. He is a graduate of the University of Virginia (BA in government), the University of Nebraska College of Law (JD), and the University of Nebraska Omaha (MBA). His professional experience included working as the vice president of PBC, Inc., and as a criminal prosecutor in the city of Omaha.

In a contested primary in 2006, he finished first among four candidates in his initial race for the Nebraska Legislature. He then served two terms in the nonpartisan legislature, representing Nebraska's 4th legislative district, which includes West Omaha. He sat on the Banking, Commerce and Insurance committee and the Revenue committee.

Nebraska's term-limits law precluded Pirsch from running for re-election in 2014. In October 2013, he announced that he would run for Nebraska State Auditor, but after Nebraska Attorney General Jon Bruning announced that he was running for governor, Pirsch decided to run instead for Nebraska Attorney General in the 2014 election. However, he lost in the primaries to Doug Peterson. He is currently serving as a Deputy Sarpy County attorney.
