= Nebraska County Courts =

The County Courts of the US state of Nebraska are trial courts with a limited jurisdiction. They are located in every county of the State. There are 12 county judge districts, made up of varying counties, with varying numbers of judges assigned to each district.

== Jurisdiction ==
County Courts have exclusive original jurisdiction for most probate matters, matters relating to guardianship and adoption and except if a separate juvenile court already exists in that jurisdiction, where it has concurrent original jurisdiction, matters relating to conservatorship, actions relating to violation of city of village ordinances, except when committed by a minor, and small claims. They also have concurrent original jurisdiction with the District Court for some matters, namely misdemeanour criminal and traffic infraction cases, some divorce cases, and civil cases concerning $57,000 or less.

== Small Claims Court ==
Every county court has a small claims department, called the small claims court. The small claims courts are responsible for civil actions not exceeding $6,000, which will increase to $7,500 from 1 July 2025, and civil matters where the plaintiff seeks to disaffirm, avoid, or rescind a contract or agreement for the purchase of goods or services not in excess of the aforementioned amount. Proceedings are without a jury, or counsel for either party in most cases, and are more informal than other courts. Appeals are typically made to the district court.

== County judge districts ==
District	Number of judges	Counties
1	Three	Saline, Jefferson, Gage, Thayer, Johnson, Pawnee, Nemaha, Richardson
2	Four	Sarpy, Cass, Otoe
3	Seven	Lancaster
4	Twelve	Douglas
5	Five	Merrick, Platte, Colfax, Boone, Nance, Hamilton, Polk, York, Butler, Seward, Saunders
6	Four	Dixon, Dakota, Cedar, Burt, Thurston, Dodge, Washington
7	Three	Knox, Cuming, Antelope, Pierce, Wayne, Madison, Stanton
8	Three	Cherry, Keya Paha, Brown, Rock, Blaine, Loup, Custer, Boyd, Holt, Garfield, Wheeler, Valley, Greeley, Sherman, Howard
9	Five	Buffalo, Hall
10	Three	Fillmore, Adams, Phelps, Kearney, Harlan, Franklin, Webster, Clay, Nuckolls
11	Five	Hooker, Thomas, Arthur, McPherson, Logan, Keith, Perkins, Lincoln, Dawson, Chase, Hayes, Frontier, Gosper, Dundy, Hitchcock, Red Willow, Furnas
12	Five	Sioux, Dawes, Box Butte, Sheridan, Scotts Bluff, Morrill, Garden, Banner, Kimball, Cheyenne, Grant, Deuel

== See also ==
- Courts of Nebraska
