= John Savage (Nebraska politician) =

American politician (1905–1989)

Member of the Nebraska Legislature from the 10th district
- In office January 5, 1971 – January 3, 1979
- Preceded by: Clifton Batchelder
- Succeeded by: Carol McBride Pirsch

Personal details
- Born: June 25, 1905 Denver, Colorado
- Died: June 19, 1989 (aged 83) Omaha, Nebraska
- Party: Republican
- Spouse: Marie M. Schofield (m. 1930)
- Children: 2
- Education: University of Nebraska
- Occupation: Photographer and reporter

John Savage (June 25, 1905 – June 19, 1989) was a Republican politician and photojournalist from Nebraska who served as a member of the Nebraska Legislature from the 10th district from 1971 to 1979.

== Early life ==
Savage was born in Denver, Colorado, in 1905, and grew up in Omaha, Nebraska, graduating from Technical High School. He attended the University of Nebraska and was a pre-med student, but did not graduate. While at the University of Nebraska, he was a copy messenger of the Lincoln Journal and then worked for the Bee-News and the Omaha World-Herald as a photojournalist. He retired in 1970.

== Nebraska Legislature ==
In 1970, State Senator Clifton Batchelder opted to run for Governor rather than seek re-election, and Savage ran to succeed him in the Omaha-based 10th district. In the nonpartisan primary, he faced attorney and former deputy county assessor Samuel Boyer, federal prosecutor Richard Edgerton, insurance agent Bud Reed, and lawyer Steve Stevens. Savage placed first in the primary winning 30 percent of the vote to Edgerton's 25 percent, and they both advanced to the general election. Savage ultimately defeated Edgerton, winning his first term 54–46 percent.

Savage ran for re-election in 1974. He was challenged by Michael O'Connor, a college student at the University of Nebraska at Omaha, and engineer August Allen. In the primary election, Savage placed first, winning 54 percent of the vote to O'Connor's 36 percent and Allen's 10 percent. He and O'Connor advanced to the general election, where he won his second term, 58–42 percent.

He declined to seek re-election in 1978, citing in part the low legislative pay.

== Death ==
Savage died on June 19, 1989.
