= Carol McBride Pirsch =

American politician

Member of the Nebraska Legislature from the 10th district
- In office January 3, 1979 – January 8, 1997
- Preceded by: John Savage
- Succeeded by: Deborah Suttle

Personal details
- Born: December 27, 1936 (age 89) Omaha, Nebraska, U.S.
- Party: Republican
- Spouse: Allen Pirsch
- Children: 6 (including Pete Pirsch)
- Education: Miami University; University of Nebraska Omaha
- Occupation: Lawyer

Carol McBride Pirsch (born December 27, 1936) was a member of the Nebraska Legislature. Born to Lyle Erwin and Hilfrie Lebeck McBride in Omaha, Nebraska, Pirsch attended Beals Grade School; Central High School; Miami University in Oxford, Ohio; and the University of Nebraska Omaha. She was married to Allen Pirsch on March 28, 1954, and they had six children: Penny Elizabeth, Pamela Elaine, Patrice Eileen, Phyllis Erika, Peter Allen and Perry Andrew.

Pirsch was first elected to the Nebraska Legislature, the 10th Legislative District, on August 11, 1978. She served 18 years in the Nebraska Legislature before her election to the Douglas County Board of Commissioners in 1996, where she served for eight years.
