= Nebraska District Courts =

District Courts are the general trial courts of the US state of Nebraska, however it hears appeals from County Courts and some other administrative bodies.

== Judicial Districts ==
District	Number of judges	Counties
1	Three	Saline, Jefferson, Gage, Thayer, Johnson, Pawnee, Nemaha, Fillmore, Richardson, Otoe
2	Four	Sarpy, Cass
3	Eight	Lancaster
4	Eighteen	Douglas
5	Four	Merrick, Platte, Colfax, Boone, Nance, Hamilton, Polk, York, Butler, Seward, Saunders
6	Three	Dixon, Dakota, Cedar, Burt, Thurston, Dodge, Washington
7	Two	Knox, Cuming, Antelope, Pierce, Wayne, Madison, Stanton
8	Two	Cherry, Keya Paha, Brown, Rock, Blaine, Loup, Custer, Boyd, Holt, Garfield, Wheeler, Valley, Greeley, Sherman, Howard
9	Four	Buffalo, Hall
10	Two	Adams, Phelps, Kearney, Harlan, Franklin, Webster, Clay, Nuckolls
11	Four	Hooker, Thomas, Arthur, McPherson, Logan, Keith, Perkins, Lincoln, Dawson, Chase, Hayes, Frontier, Gosper, Dundy, Hitchcock, Red Willow, Furnas
12	Four	Sioux, Dawes, Box Butte, Sheridan, Scotts Bluff, Morrill, Garden, Banner, Kimball, Cheyenne, Grant, Deuel
