= Nebraska Workers' Compensation Court =

Workers' compensation court of Nebraska

- State Seal of Nebraska
- Established: 1935
- Jurisdiction: Nebraska
- Location: Lincoln and Omaha, Nebraska
- Composition method: Missouri Plan
- Authorised by: Nebraska Revised Statutes
- Appeals to: Nebraska Court of Appeals
- Number of positions: 6
- Website: Official Website

Presiding Judge
- Currently: Julie A. Martin
- Since: July 1, 2025
- Lead position ends: June 30, 2027

The Nebraska Workers' Compensation Court is a court in the U.S. state of Nebraska with exclusive jurisdiction over workers' compensation disputes.

== History ==
The Workers' Compensation Court was established in 1935 by the Nebraska Legislature as the Workmen's Compensation Court with three judges. The court was given exclusive original jurisdiction over claims arising under the state's workers' compensation laws, and the state's district courts were originally given appellate jurisdiction over the compensation court's decisions. While other judges in the state were elected at the time, judges on the compensation court were appointed by the Governor to renewable six-year terms, and no more than two members of the court could be members of the same political party. Originally, one judge was designated as a representative of employers, one as a representative of workers, and only one was required to be an attorney.

In 1963, the Legislature required that future judges appointed to the court to be attorneys, with the same qualifications as district court judges. In 1965, the Legislature added a fourth judge and lengthened the term of office to eight years. The Legislature reverted to six-year terms in 1967, adopted the Missouri Plan for members of the court, which resulted in the creation of a judicial nominating commission for the court and a requirement that judges run in nonpartisan retention elections every six years.

The Legislature expanded the court to five judges in 1975 and provided that appeals would be heard by the Nebraska Supreme Court, not district courts. In 1983, the court was expanded to six judges. In 1986, the court's name was changed to the Workers' Compensation Court. In 1988, over Governor Kay Orr's veto, the Legislature increased the size of the court to seven judges, but reduced it to six judges in 2023, with the Business and Labor Committee citing a reduced workload. In 1991, Judge Laureen K. Van Norman, appointed by Governor Ben Nelson, became the first woman to serve as a judge on the court.

== Organization and jurisdiction ==
When a claim is filed, one of the six judges is assigned to hear the claim in the county in which it was filed and renders a decision on the claim. Following a change to the workers' compensation system in 2011, either party may appeal directly to the Court of Appeals, though some cases are reheard by three-judge panels.

The court administers the Workers' Compensation Court Trust Fund, "reviews qualifications of employers who want to be self-insured," and is responsible for "certifying vocational rehabilitation providers, administering the medical, surgical and hospital fee schedules, providing the independent medical examiner system, certifying managed care plans, creating publications and providing informal dispute resolution."

The members of the court elect a Presiding Judge on July 1 of every odd-numbered year to serve a two-year term, which must be approved by the Supreme Court. The presiding judge "rule[s] on all matters submitted to the compensation court," with the exception of the initial hearings. The Presiding Judge also appoints a clerk and administrator of the court.

== Members ==
Current members of the Nebraska Workers' Compensation Court
Judge	Took office	Appointed by	Law school	Retained
Julie A. Martin, Presiding Judge	December 23, 2014	Dave Heineman (R)	Creighton	2018, 2024
John R. Hoffert	October 4, 2001	Mike Johanns (R)	Nebraska	2004, 2010, 2016, 2022
Thomas E. Stine	September 13, 2011	Dave Heineman (R)	South Dakota	2014, 2020
Daniel R. Fridrich	September 18, 2012	Dave Heineman (R)	Nebraska	2016, 2022
Dirk V. Block	December 8, 2016	Pete Ricketts (R)	Creighton	2020
Brynne Holsten Puhl	April 24, 2024	Jim Pillen (R)	Nebraska	n/a
