= Nebraska Juvenile Courts =

Nebraskan juvenile courts

The Separate Juvenile Courts of the US state of Nebraska are specialised courts located in the counties of Douglas, Lancaster, and Sarpy. A county which has a population of or over 75,000 is eligible to have a separate juvenile court, and the proposal to establish one must be voted on by the electorate of the county. The clerk of the district court in the county serves ex-officio as the clerk of the juvenile court.

Juvenile courts have jurisdiction over certain juveniles who have committed traffic offences, misdemeanours, infractions, violations of city ordinances, and well as all juveniles who have committed a felony, who are mentally ill and dangerous, who are homeless, destitute, abandoned, or lacking care, who are habitually truant from home or school, amongst other areas.

== Judges ==
A juvenile court has two judges if it has a population of more than 75,000, four judges if more than 300,000, and six judges if more than 500,000. Judges serve for an initial term of three years, then, following a retention vote, six years.

As of July 2024, the judges of the courts are:

County	Judges
Sarpy	Jonathon D. Crosby Sarah M. Moore
Lancaster	Roger J. Heideman Reggie L. Ryder Shellie D. Sabata Elise M. W. White
Douglas	Chad M. Brown Vernon Daniels Matthew R. Kahler Candice J. Novak Amy N. Schuchman Mary M. Z. Stevens
