= Nebraska =

U.S. state

- State
- Flag Seal
- Nickname: The Cornhusker State
- Motto: Equality before the law
- Anthem: "Beautiful Nebraska"
- Location of Nebraska within the United States
- Coordinates: 41.5°N 100.0°W
- Country: United States
- Before statehood: Nebraska Territory
- Admitted to the Union: March 1, 1867 (37th)
- Capital: Lincoln
- Largest city: Omaha
- Largest county or equivalent: Douglas
- Largest metro and urban areas: Omaha–Council Bluffs

Government
  - Governor: Jim Pillen (R)
  - Lieutenant Governor: Joe Kelly (R)
- Legislature: Nebraska Legislature
- Judiciary: Nebraska Supreme Court
- U.S. senators: Deb Fischer (R); Pete Ricketts (R)
- U.S. House delegation: 1: Mike Flood (R); 2: Don Bacon (R); 3: Adrian Smith (R) (list)

Area
  - Total: 77,347.428 sq mi (200,328.919 km^{2})
  - Land: 76,815.242 sq mi (198,950.563 km^{2})
  - Water: 532.183 sq mi (1,378.347 km^{2}) 0.69%
  - Rank: 16th

Dimensions
  - Length: 430 mi (690 km)
  - Width: 210 mi (340 km)
- Elevation: 2,590 ft (790 m)
- Highest elevation (Panorama Point (Note: Elevation adjusted to North American Vertical Datum of 1988)): 5,427 ft (1,654 m)
- Lowest elevation (Missouri River at Kansas border): 840 ft (256 m)

Population (2020)
  - Total: 1,961,504
  - Estimate (2025): 2,018,006 ▲
  - Rank: 38th
  - Density: 25.53535/sq mi (9.859253/km^{2})
  - Rank: 43rd
  - Median household income: $74,600 (2023)
  - Income rank: 27th
- Demonym: Nebraskan

Language
  - Official language: English
  - Spoken language: English

Time zones
- Most of the state: UTC−06:00 (CST)
  - Summer (DST): UTC−05:00 (CDT)
- Panhandle: UTC−07:00 (MST)
  - Summer (DST): UTC−06:00 (MDT)
- USPS abbreviation: NE
- ISO 3166 code: US-NE
- Traditional abbreviation: Neb., Nebr.
- Website: nebraska.gov

State symbols of Nebraska
List of state symbols
- Flag of Nebraska

- Seal of Nebraska

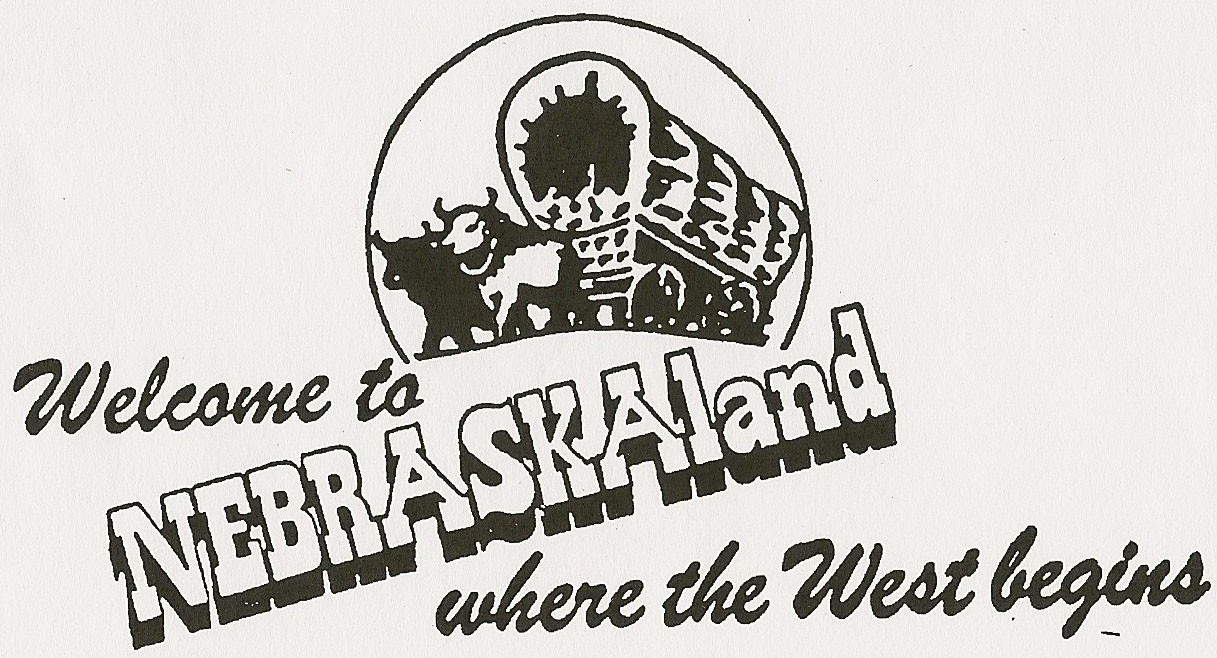
- Slogan: Welcome to NEBRASKAland where the West begins

Living insignia
- Bird: Western meadowlark
- Fish: Channel catfish
- Flower: Tall Goldenrod
- Grass: Little bluestem
- Insect: Western honey bee
- Mammal: White-tailed deer
- Tree: Eastern Cottonwood

Inanimate insignia
- Beverage: Milk; Soft drink: Kool-aid
- Dance: Square dance
- Fossil: Mammoth
- Gemstone: Blue agate
- Rock: Prairie agate
- River: Platte River
- Soil: Holdrege series

State route marker

Nebraska (/nəˈbræskə/ nə-BRASK-ə) is a landlocked state in the Great Plains and Midwestern region of the United States. It borders South Dakota to the north; Wyoming to the west; Colorado to the southwest; Kansas to the south; and Missouri to the southeast and Iowa to the east, both across the Missouri River. Nebraska is the 16th-largest state by land area, with just over 77,347 square miles (200,330 km^{2}). As of the 2020 census, the population was 1,961,504, and was estimated to be 2,018,006 in 2025, it is the 38th-most populous state and the eighth-least densely populated. Nebraska's capital is Lincoln, and its most populous city is Omaha, which is on the Missouri River.

Nebraska was admitted into the United States in 1867, two years after the end of the American Civil War. The Nebraska Legislature is unlike any other American legislature in that it is unicameral, and its members are elected without any official reference to political party affiliation. Nebraska is one of only two states (Maine being the other) that divide electoral college votes by district, and is not winner-take-all state-wide.

Nebraska is composed of two major land regions: the Dissected Till Plains and the Great Plains. The Dissected Till Plains region consists of gently rolling hills and contains the state's largest cities, Omaha and Lincoln. The Great Plains region, occupying most of western Nebraska, is characterized by treeless prairie. Eastern Nebraska has a humid continental climate while western Nebraska is primarily semi-arid. The state has wide variations between winter and summer temperatures; the variations decrease in southern Nebraska. Violent thunderstorms and tornadoes occur primarily during spring and summer, and sometimes in autumn. The Chinook wind tends to warm the state significantly in the winter and early spring.

Indigenous peoples, including Omaha, Missouria, Ponca, Pawnee, Otoe, and various branches of the Lakota (Sioux) tribes, lived in the region for thousands of years before European discovery and exploration. The state is crossed by many historic trails, including that of the Lewis and Clark Expedition. The completion of the Transcontinental Railroad through Nebraska and passage of the Homestead Acts led to rapid growth in the population of American settlers in the 1870s and 1880s and the development of a large agriculture sector for which the state is known to this day.

== Etymology ==
Nebraska's name is the result of anglicization of the archaic Otoe Ñí Brásge (contemporary Otoe: Ñíbrahge, pronounced [ɲĩbɾasꜜkɛ]), or the Omaha Ní Btháska (Omaha–Ponca pronunciation: [nĩbɫᶞasꜜka]), meaning 'flat water', after the Platte River which flows through the state.

== History ==
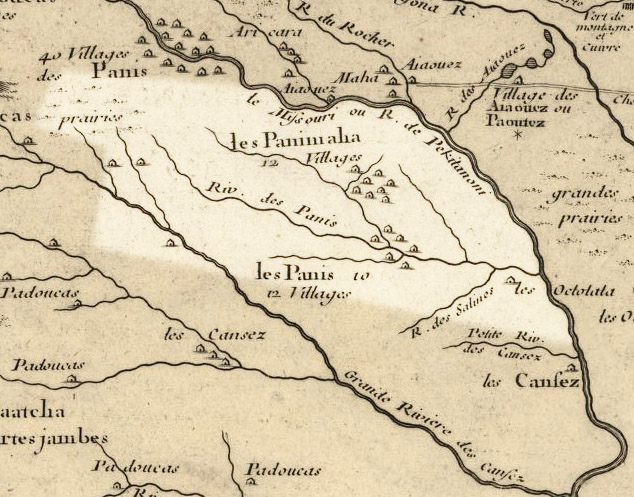
Nebraska in 1718, Guillaume de L'Isle map, with the approximate area of the future state highlighted

=== Early history ===
Indigenous peoples lived in the region of present-day Nebraska for thousands of years before European colonization. The historic tribes in the state included the Omaha, Missouria, Ponca, Pawnee, Otoe, and various branches of the Lakota (Sioux), some of which migrated from eastern areas into the region. When European exploration, trade, and settlement began, both Spain and France sought to control the region. In the 1690s, Spain established trade connections with the Apache, whose territory then included western Nebraska. By 1703, France had developed a regular trade with native peoples along the Missouri River in Nebraska, and by 1719 had signed treaties with several of these peoples. After war broke out between the two countries, Spain dispatched an armed expedition to Nebraska under Lieutenant General Pedro de Villasur in 1720. The party was attacked and destroyed near present-day Columbus by a large force of Pawnee and Otoe, both allied with the French. The massacre ended Spanish exploration of the area for the remainder of the 18th century. In 1762, during the Seven Years' War, France ceded the Louisiana Territory to Spain. This left Britain and Spain competing for dominance along the Mississippi River; by 1773, the British were trading with the native peoples of Nebraska. Spain dispatched two trading expeditions up the Missouri River in 1794 and 1795; the second, under James Mackay, established the first European settlement in Nebraska near the mouth of the Platte River. Later that year, Mackay's party built a trading post, dubbed Fort Carlos IV (Fort Charles), near present-day Homer.

=== American settlement and statehood ===
In 1819, the United States established Fort Atkinson as the first U.S. Army post west of the Missouri River, just east of present-day Fort Calhoun. The army abandoned the fort in 1827 as migration moved farther west. European-American settlement was scarce until 1848 and the California Gold Rush. On May 30, 1854, the U.S. Congress created the Kansas and Nebraska territories, divided by the Parallel 40° North, under the Kansas–Nebraska Act. The Nebraska Territory included parts of the modern-day states of Colorado, North Dakota, South Dakota, Wyoming, and Montana. The territorial capital of Nebraska was Omaha.

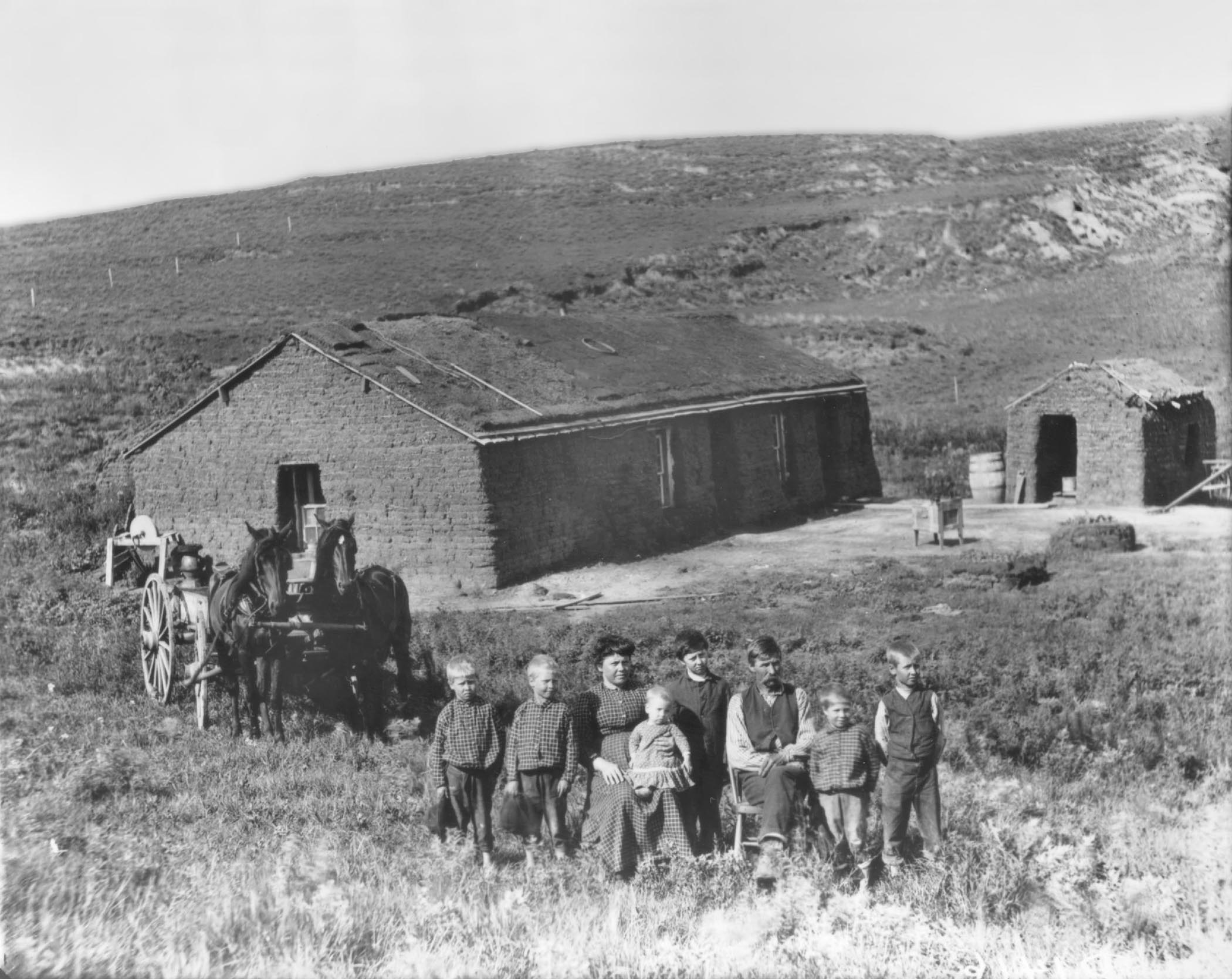
Homesteaders in central Nebraska in 1888

=== Late 19th century ===
In the 1860s, after the U.S. government forced many of the American Indian tribes to cede their lands and settle on reservations, it opened large tracts of land to agricultural development by European immigrants and American settlers. Under the Homestead Act, thousands of settlers migrated into Nebraska to claim free land granted by the federal government. Because so few trees grew on the prairies, many of the first farming settlers built their homes of sod, as had Native Americans such as the Omaha. The first wave of settlement gave the territory a sufficient population to apply for statehood. Nebraska became the 37th state on March 1, 1867, and the capital was moved from Omaha to the center at Lancaster, later renamed Lincoln after the recently assassinated President of the United States, Abraham Lincoln. The battle of Massacre Canyon, on August 5, 1873, was the last major battle between the Pawnee and the Sioux.

During the 1870s to the 1880s, Nebraska experienced a large growth in population. Several factors contributed to attracting new residents. The first was that the vast prairie land was perfect for cattle grazing. This helped settlers to learn the unfamiliar geography of the area. The second factor was the invention of several farming technologies. New agricultural innovations such as barbed wire, windmills, and the steel plow, combined with fair weather, enabled settlers to transform Nebraska into prime farming land. By the 1880s, Nebraska's population had soared to more than 450,000 people. The Arbor Day holiday was founded in Nebraska City by territorial governor J. Sterling Morton. The National Arbor Day Foundation is still headquartered in Nebraska City, with some offices in Lincoln.

In the late 19th century, African Americans migrated from the South to Nebraska as part of the Great Migration. Eventually, they moved primarily to Omaha which offered working-class jobs in meat packing, the railroads and other industries. Omaha has a long history of civil rights activism. Blacks encountered discrimination from other Americans in Omaha and especially from recent European immigrants who were also competing for the same jobs as well.

=== 20th century ===
In 1912, African Americans founded the Omaha chapter of the National Association for the Advancement of Colored People to work for improved conditions in the city and state. During the Omaha Race Riots in 1919, many white rioters protested throughout Omaha in response to an incident in which a black man was accused of sexually assaulting a white woman. The Great Depression also greatly affected the residents of Nebraska. From 1930 to 1936 the Dust Bowl, a period of dust storms caused by drought, destruction of topsoil by farming practices, and other factors affected Nebraska along with much of the Midwestern United States. In 1934, voters passed an initiative to make Nebraska's legislature a unicameral body, and the first unicameral session was held in 1937. Kay Orr was elected Nebraska's first female governor on November 4, 1986.

== Geography ==
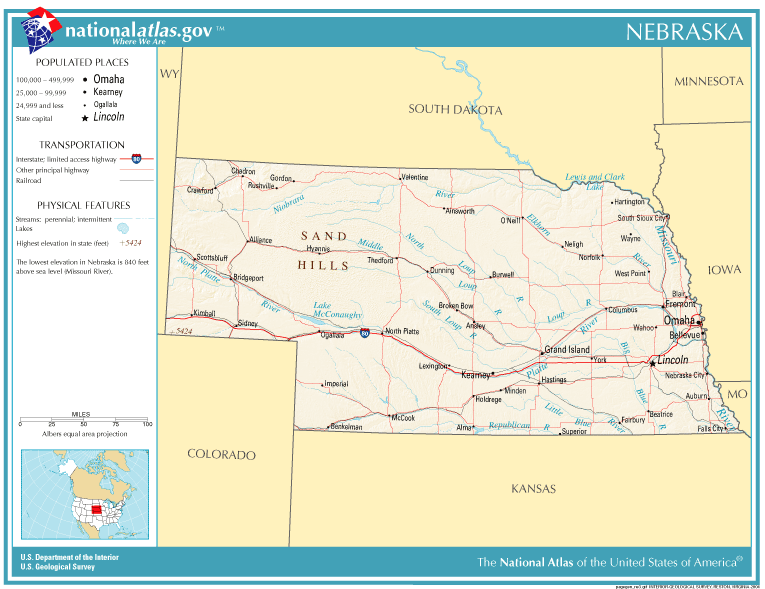
A map of Nebraska

The state is bordered by South Dakota to the north; Iowa to the east and Missouri to the southeast, across the Missouri River; Kansas to the south; Colorado to the southwest; and Wyoming to the west. It is the only triply landlocked state in the United States. The state has 93 counties and is split between two time zones, with the majority of the state observing Central Time and the Panhandle and surrounding counties observing Mountain Time.

Three rivers cross the state from west to east:

- The Niobrara River flows through the northern part of the state, and
- The Platte River, formed by the confluence of the North Platte and the South Platte, runs through the state's central portion
- The Republican River runs across the southern part.

The first Constitution of Nebraska in 1866 described Nebraska's boundaries as follows:

The State of Nebraska shall consist of all the territory included within the following boundaries, to-wit: Commencing at a point formed by the intersection of the western boundary of the State of Missouri, with the fortieth degree of north latitude; extending thence due west along said fortieth degree of north latitude, to a point formed by its intersection with the twenty-fifth degree of longitude west from Washington [the Southern border]; thence north along said twenty-fifth degree of longitude, to a point formed by its intersection with the forty-first degree of north latitude; thence west along said forty-first degree of north latitude to a point formed by its intersection with the twenty-seventh degree of longitude west from Washington; thence north along said twenty-seventh degree of west longitude, to a point formed by its intersection with the forty-third degree of north latitude [the Western border, which is the Panhandle]; thence east along said forty-third degree of north latitude to the Keya Paha river; thence down the middle of the channel of said river, with its meanderings, to its junction with the Niobrara River; thence down the middle of the channel of said Niobrara River, and following the meanderings thereof to its junction with the Missouri River [the Northern border]; thence down the middle of the channel of said Missouri River, and following the meanderings thereof to the place of beginning [the Eastern border, which is the Missouri River].

The description given for the northern border is no longer accurate, since the Keya Paha River and the Niobrara River no longer form the boundary of the state of Nebraska. Instead, Nebraska's northern border now extends east along the forty-third degree of north latitude until it meets the Missouri River directly.

Nebraska is composed of two major land regions, the Dissected Till Plains and the Great Plains. The easternmost portion of the state was scoured by Ice Age glaciers; the Dissected Till Plains were left after the glaciers retreated. The Dissected Till Plains is a region of gently rolling hills; Omaha and Lincoln are in this region. The Great Plains occupy most of western Nebraska, with the region consisting of several smaller, diverse land regions, including the Sandhills, the Pine Ridge, the Rainwater Basin, the High Plains and the Wildcat Hills. Panorama Point, at 5,424 feet (1,653 m), is Nebraska's highest point; though despite its name and elevation, it is a relatively low rise near the Colorado and Wyoming borders. A former tourist slogan for the State of Nebraska was "Where the West Begins", but this has since been changed to "Honestly, it's not for everyone". Locations given for the beginning of the "West" in Nebraska include the Missouri River, the intersection of 13th and O Streets in Lincoln (where it is marked by a red brick star), the 100th meridian, and Chimney Rock.

=== Federal land management ===
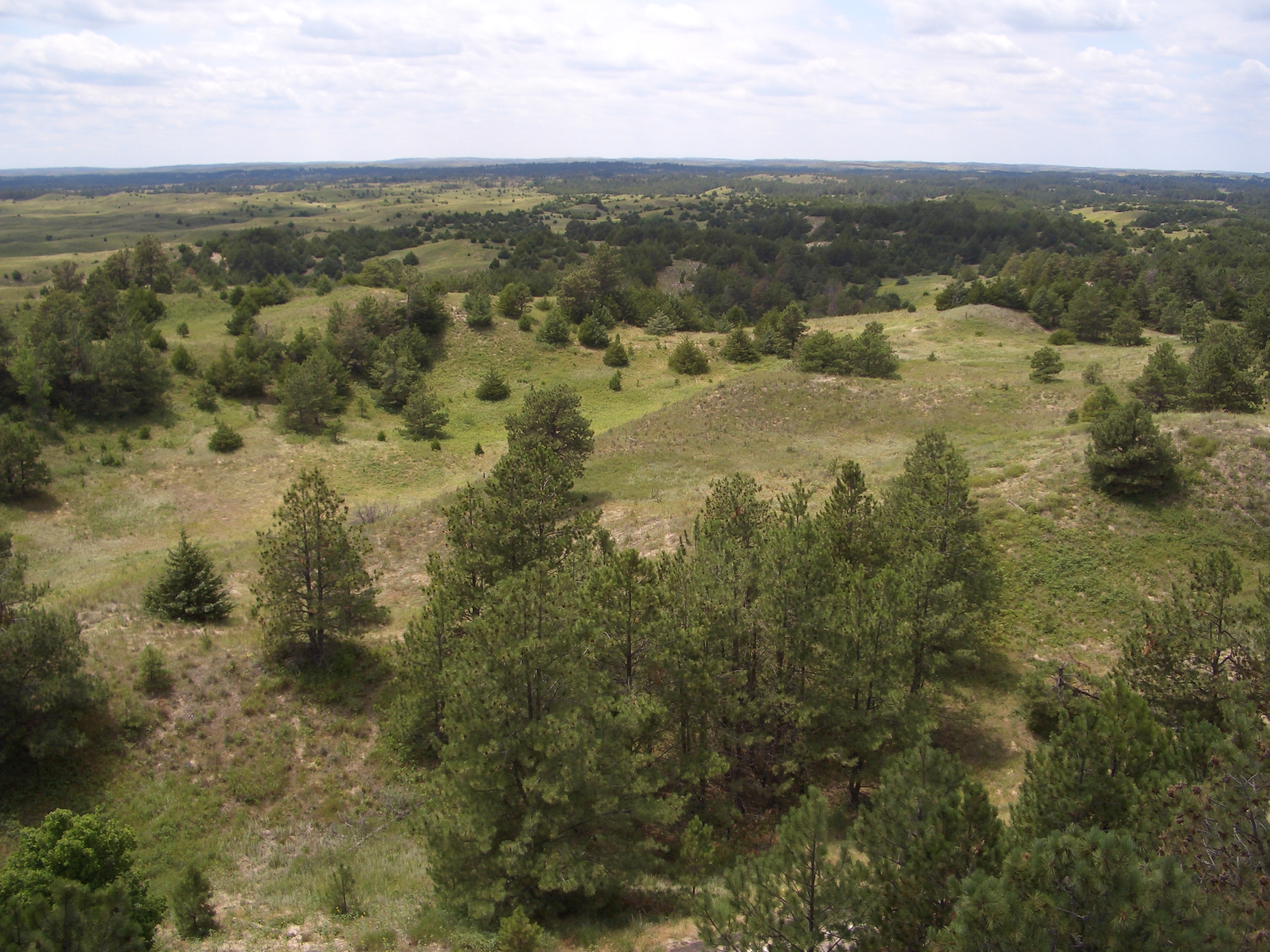
Nebraska National Forest

Areas under the management of the National Park Service include:

- Agate Fossil Beds National Monument near Harrison
- California National Historic Trail
- Chimney Rock National Historic Site near Bayard
- Homestead National Monument of America in Beatrice
- Lewis and Clark National Historic Trail
- Missouri National Recreational River near Ponca
- Mormon Pioneer National Historic Trail
- Niobrara National Scenic River near Valentine
- Oregon National Historic Trail
- Pony Express National Historic Trail
- Scotts Bluff National Monument at Gering

Areas under the management of the National Forest Service include:

- Nebraska National Forest
- Oglala National Grassland
- Samuel R. McKelvie National Forest

=== Climate ===
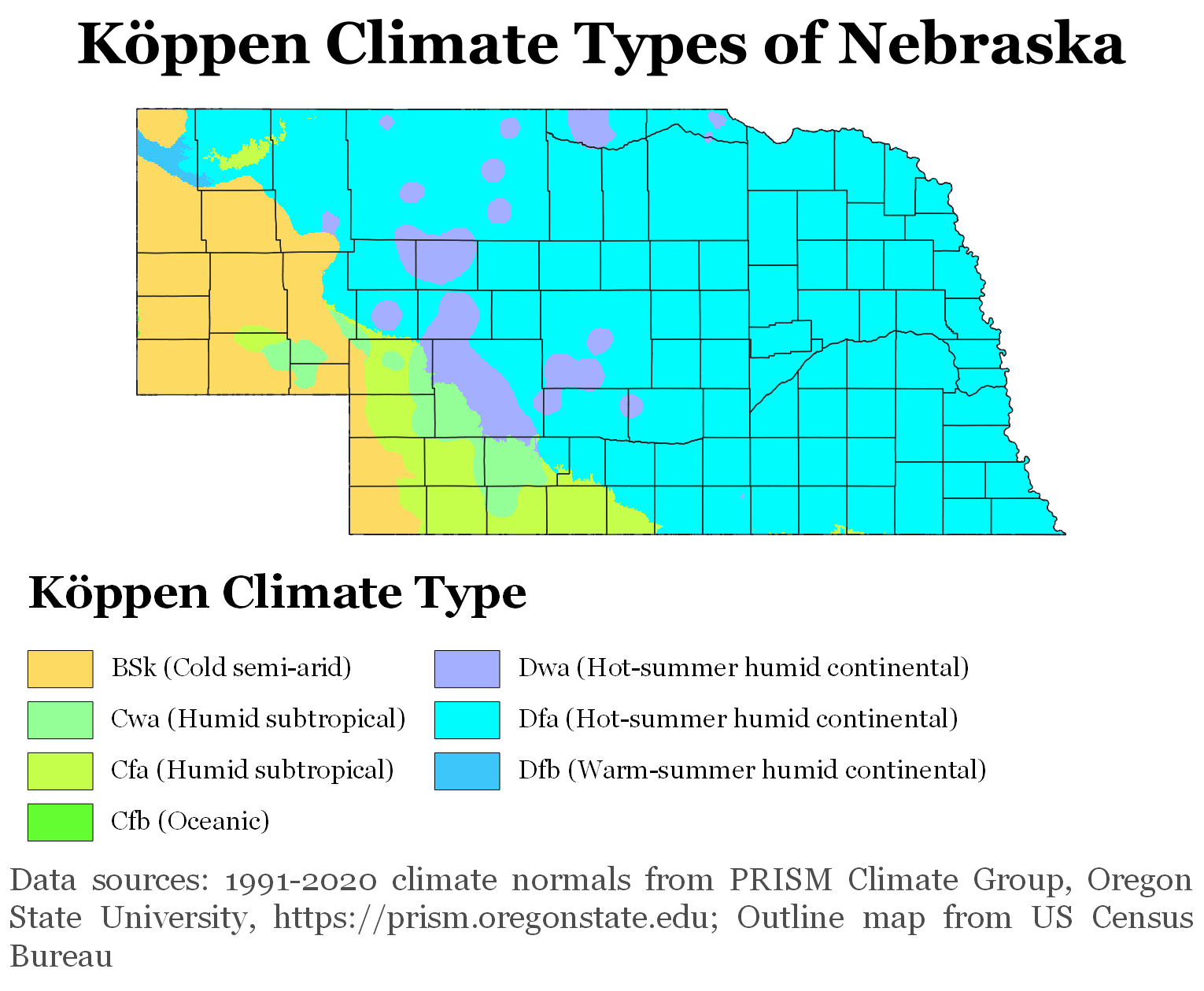
Köppen climate types of Nebraska, using 1991–2020 climate normals

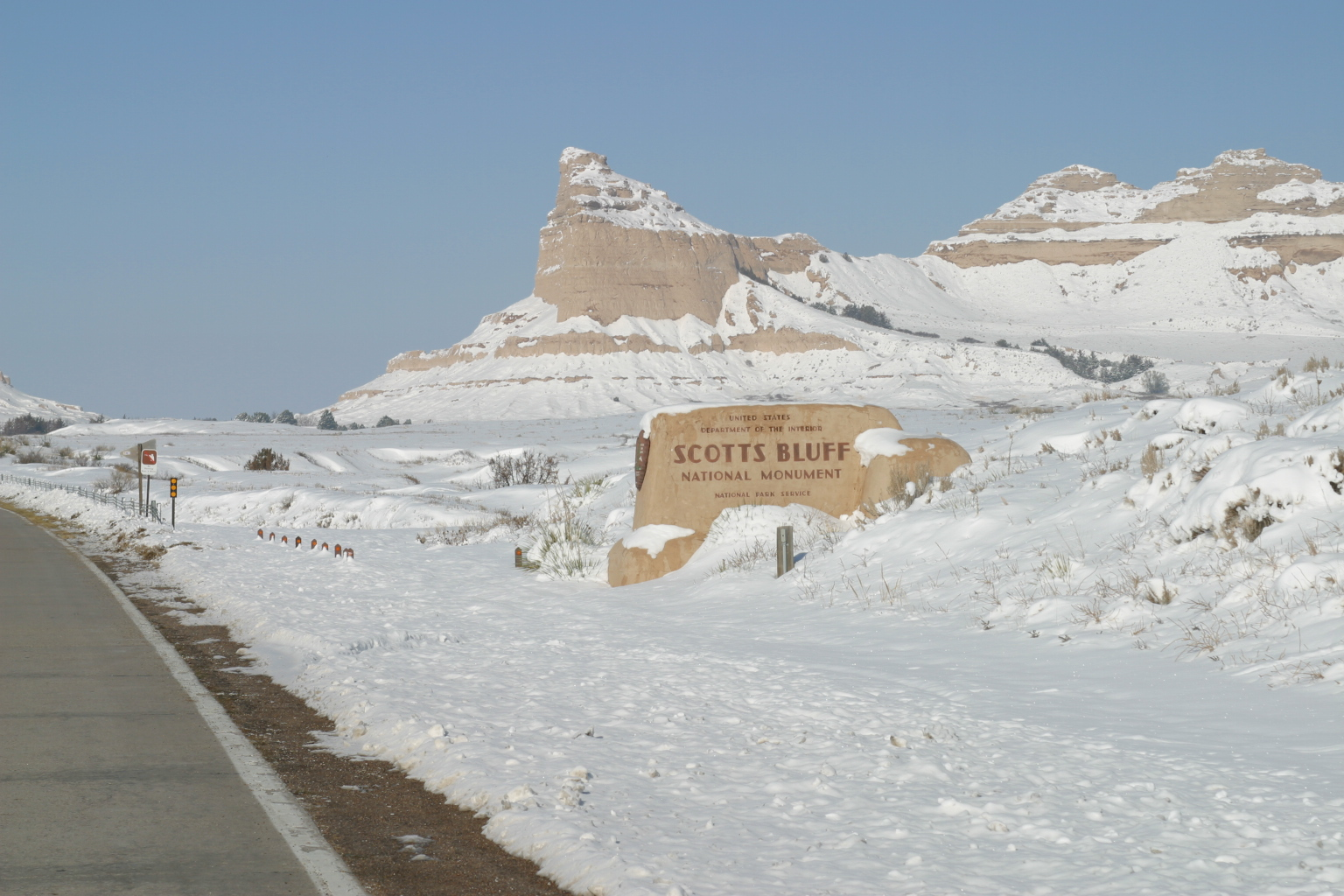
Winter at Scotts Bluff National Monument

Two major climatic zones are represented in Nebraska. The eastern two-thirds of the state has a humid continental climate (Köppen Dfa), although the southwest of this region may be classed as a humid subtropical climate (Cfa) using the −3 °C or 26.6 °F near the Kansas state line, analogous to the predominantly humid subtropical climate of Kansas and Oklahoma. Western Nebraska, including the Nebraska Panhandle and adjacent areas bordering Colorado have a semi-arid climate (Köppen BSk). The entire state experiences wide seasonal variations in both temperature and precipitation. Average temperatures are fairly uniform across Nebraska, with hot summers and generally cold winters. However, chinook winds from the Rocky Mountains provide a temporary moderating effect on temperatures in the state's western portion during the winter. Thus, average January maximum temperatures are highest at around 43 °F or 6.1 °C in southwestern Dundy County, and lowest at about 30 °F or −1.1 °C around South Sioux City in the northeast.

Average annual precipitation decreases east to west from about 31.5 inches (800 mm) in the southeast corner of the state to about 13.8 inches (350 mm) in the Panhandle. Humidity also decreases significantly from east to west. Snowfall across the state is fairly even, with most of Nebraska receiving between 25 and 35 inches (0.64 and 0.89 m) of snow each year. Nebraska's highest-recorded temperature was 118 °F (48 °C) in Minden on July 24, 1936. The state's lowest-recorded temperature was −47 °F (−44 °C) in Camp Clarke on February 12, 1899.

Nebraska is located in Tornado Alley. Thunderstorms are common during both the spring and the summer. Violent thunderstorms and tornadoes happen primarily during those two seasons, although they also can occur occasionally during the autumn.

Average daily maximum and minimum temperatures for selected cities in Nebraska
Location	July (°F)	July (°C)	January (°F)	January (°C)
Omaha	87/66	30/19	33/13	1/−10
Lincoln	89/66	31/19	35/14	2/−10
Grand Island	87/64	31/17	36/14	2/−10
Kearney	90/63	32/17	36/12	2/−11
North Platte	88/60	31/16	39/11	4/−11
Papillion	87/66	31/19	32/12	0/−11

=== Settlements ===
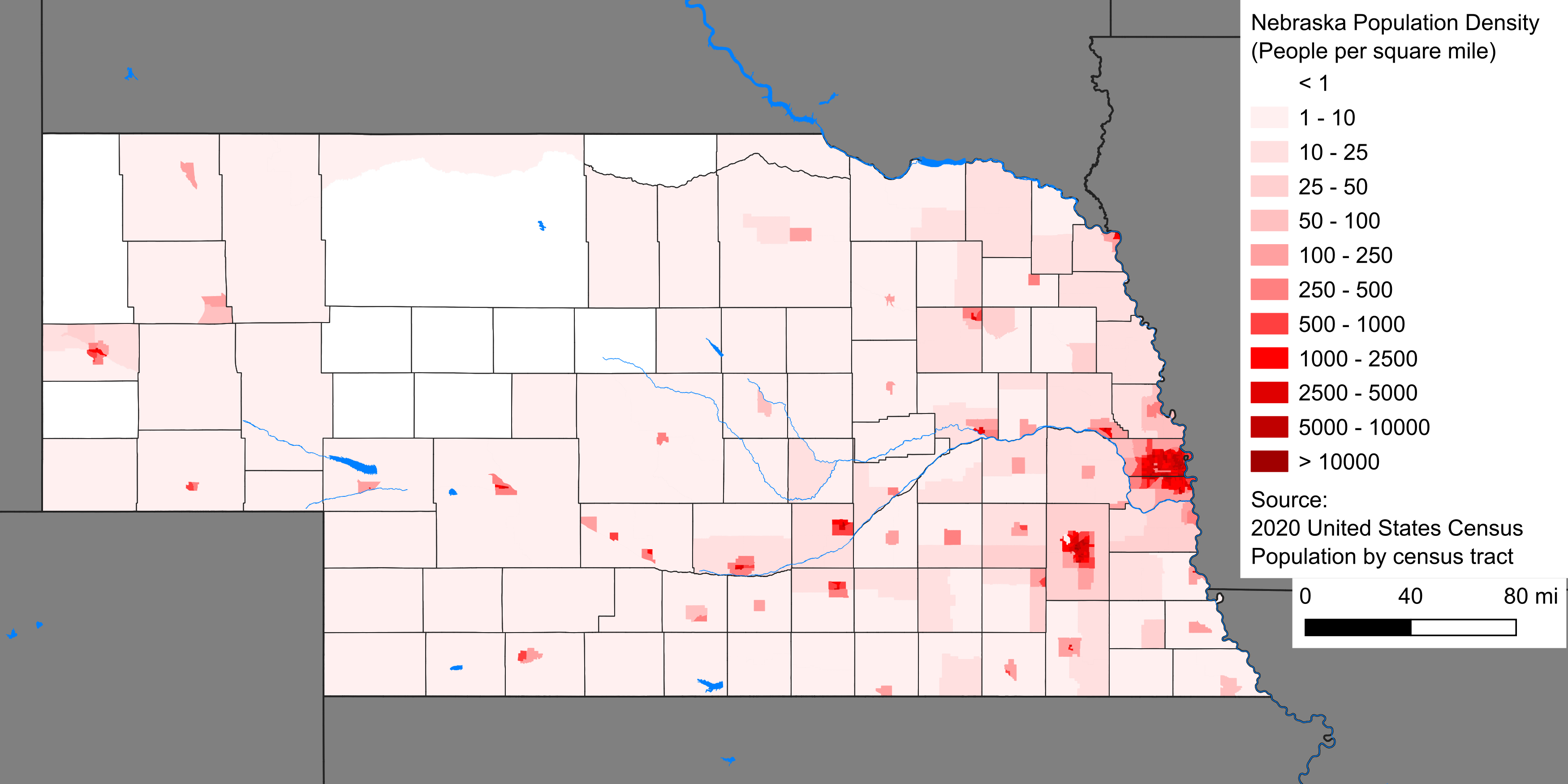
Population density in Nebraska

Eighty-nine percent of the cities in Nebraska have fewer than 3,000 people. Nebraska shares this characteristic with five other Midwestern states: Kansas, Oklahoma, North Dakota and South Dakota, and Iowa. Hundreds of towns have a population of fewer than 1,000. Regional population declines have forced many rural schools to consolidate.

Fifty-three of Nebraska's 93 counties reported declining populations between 1990 and 2000, ranging from a 0.06% loss (Frontier County) to a 17.04% loss (Hitchcock County).

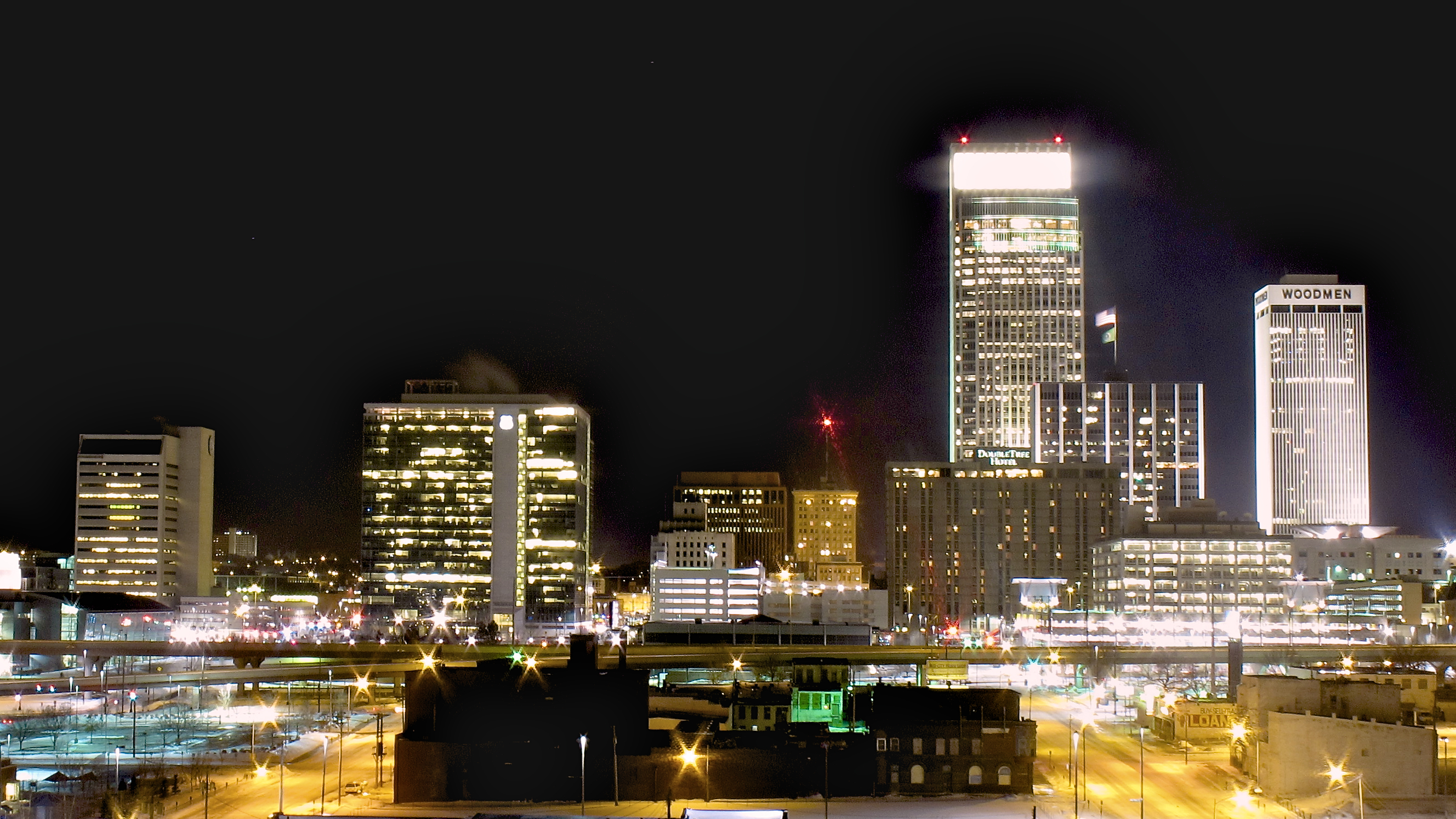
Omaha, Nebraska's largest city

More urbanized areas of the state have experienced substantial growth. In 2020, the city of Omaha had a population of 486,051 and in 2024, the city's estimated population was 489,265, a 0.7% increased from the 2020 census. In 2020, the city of Lincoln had a population of 291,082 and in 2024, the city's estimated population was 300,619, a 3.3% increased from the 2020 census.

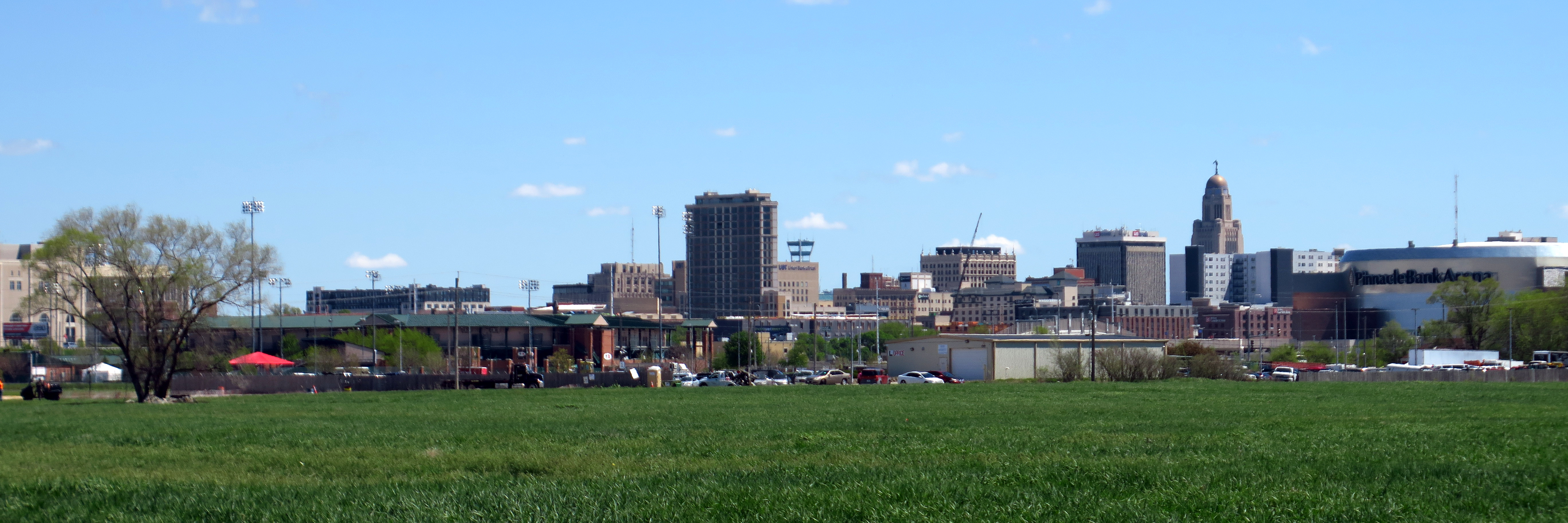
Lincoln, Nebraska's capital city

As of the 2020 census, there were 528 cities and villages in the state of Nebraska. There are five classifications of cities and villages in Nebraska, which are based upon population. All population figures are 2024 Census Bureau estimates unless flagged by a reference number.

==== Metropolitan Class City (400,000 or more) ====
- Omaha 489,265

==== Primary Class City (100,000–399,999) ====
- Lincoln 300,619

==== First Class City (5,000–99,999) ====
- Bellevue 64,777
- Grand Island 53,250
- Kearney 34,741
- Fremont 28,190
- Norfolk 26,162
- Papillion 25,248
- Hastings 25,152
- Columbus 25,126
- North Platte 22,549
- La Vista 16,543
- Scottsbluff 14,323
- South Sioux City 13,910
- Beatrice 12,290
- Lexington 11,205
- Gretna 9,207
- Gering 8,554
- York 8,179
- Alliance 8,071
- Blair 7,999
- Seward 7,752
- Crete 7,580
- Nebraska City 7,526
- McCook 7,212
- Plattsmouth 6,887
- Schuyler 6,708
- Sidney 6,483
- Ralston 6,443
- Wayne 6,229
- Holdrege 5,556
- Chadron 5,094

Second Class Cities (800–4,999) and Villages (100–799) make up the rest of the communities in Nebraska. There are 116 second-class cities and 382 villages in the state.

==== Metropolitan areas ====
- Omaha-Council Bluffs 878,138 (Nebraska portion); 1,001,010 (total for Nebraska and Iowa)
- Lincoln 350,626
- Sioux City, Iowa 26,861 (Nebraska portion); 145,994 (total for Nebraska, Iowa and South Dakota)
- Grand Island 77,278

==== Micropolitan areas ====
- Kearney 57,905
- Norfolk 48,669
- Columbus 46,325
- Hastings 40,625
- Fremont 37,884
- Scottsbluff 36,399
- North Platte 34,013
- Lexington 26,362
- Beatrice 21,687

==== Other areas ====
- Grand Island, Hastings and Kearney comprise the "Tri-Cities" area, with a combined population of 174,530.
- The northeast corner of Nebraska is part of the Siouxland region.

== Demographics ==
Historical population
Census	Pop.	Note	%±
1860	28,841		—
1870	122,993		326.5%
1880	452,402		267.8%
1890	1,062,656		134.9%
1900	1,066,300		0.3%
1910	1,192,214		11.8%
1920	1,296,372		8.7%
1930	1,377,963		6.3%
1940	1,315,834		−4.5%
1950	1,325,510		0.7%
1960	1,411,330		6.5%
1970	1,483,493		5.1%
1980	1,569,825		5.8%
1990	1,578,385		0.5%
2000	1,711,263		8.4%
2010	1,826,341		6.7%
2020	1,961,504		7.4%
2025 (est.)	2,018,006		2.9%
U.S. Decennial Census; 1910–2020; 2020–2025

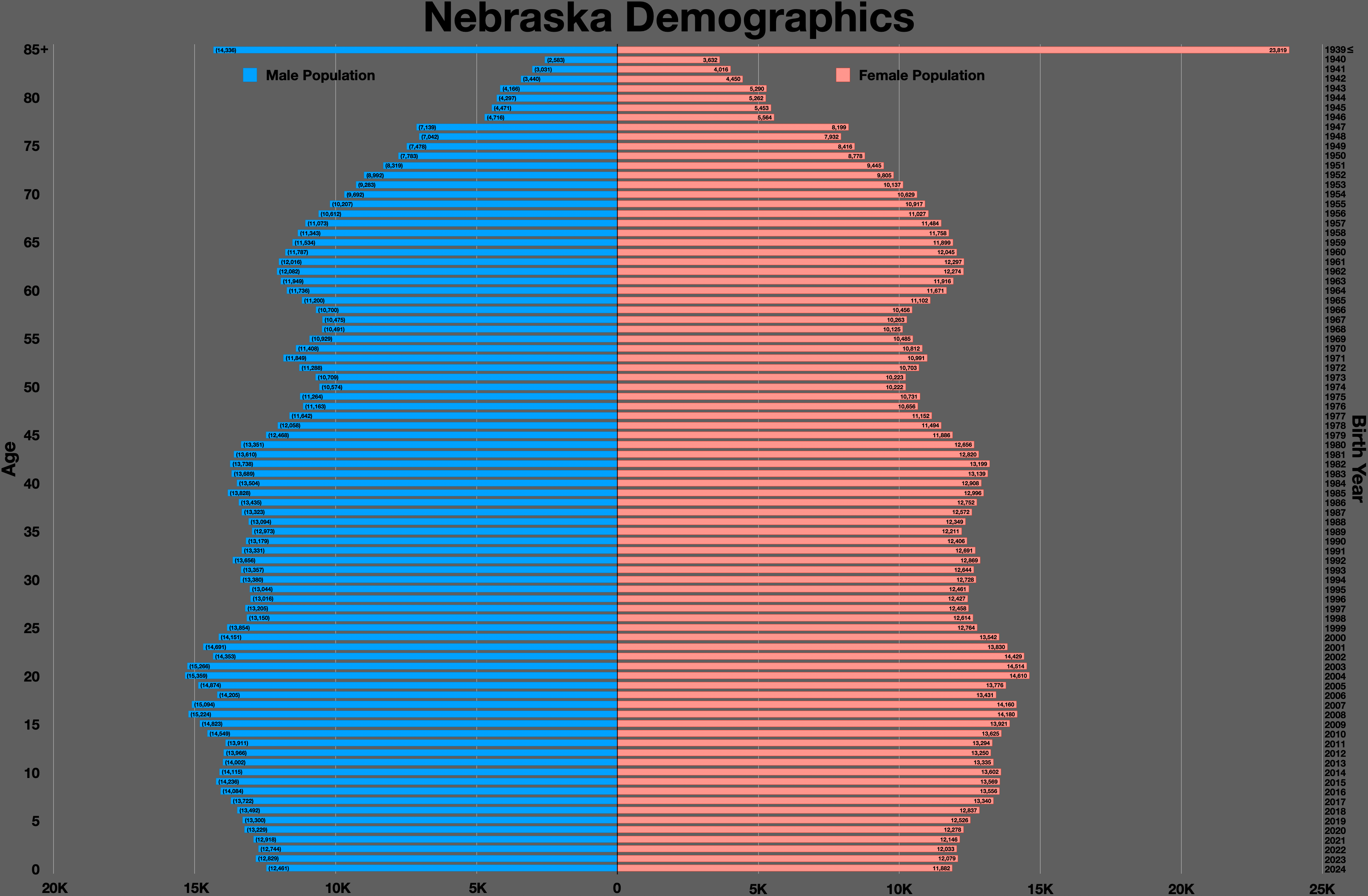
Nebraska population pyramid

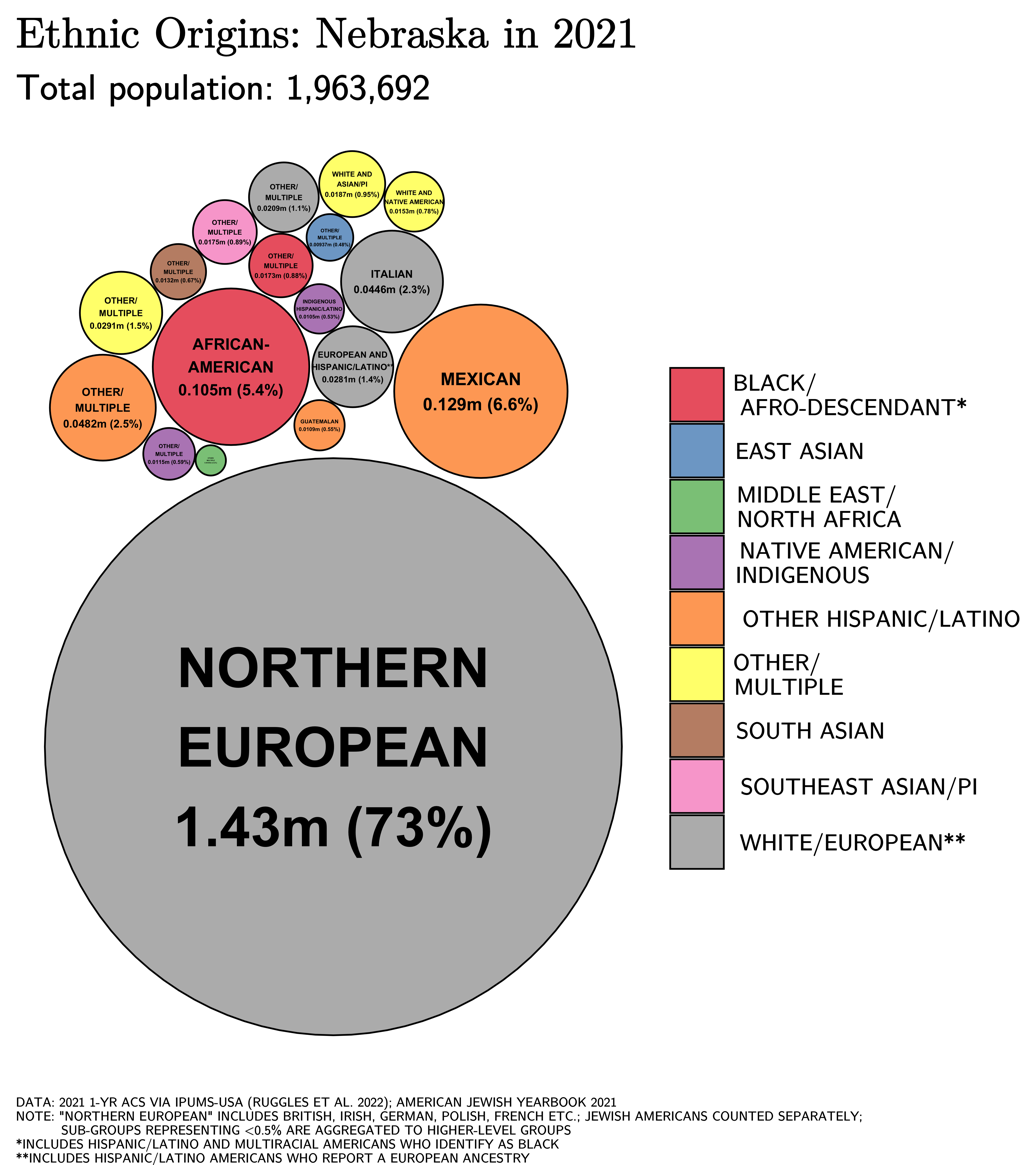
Ethnic origins in Nebraska

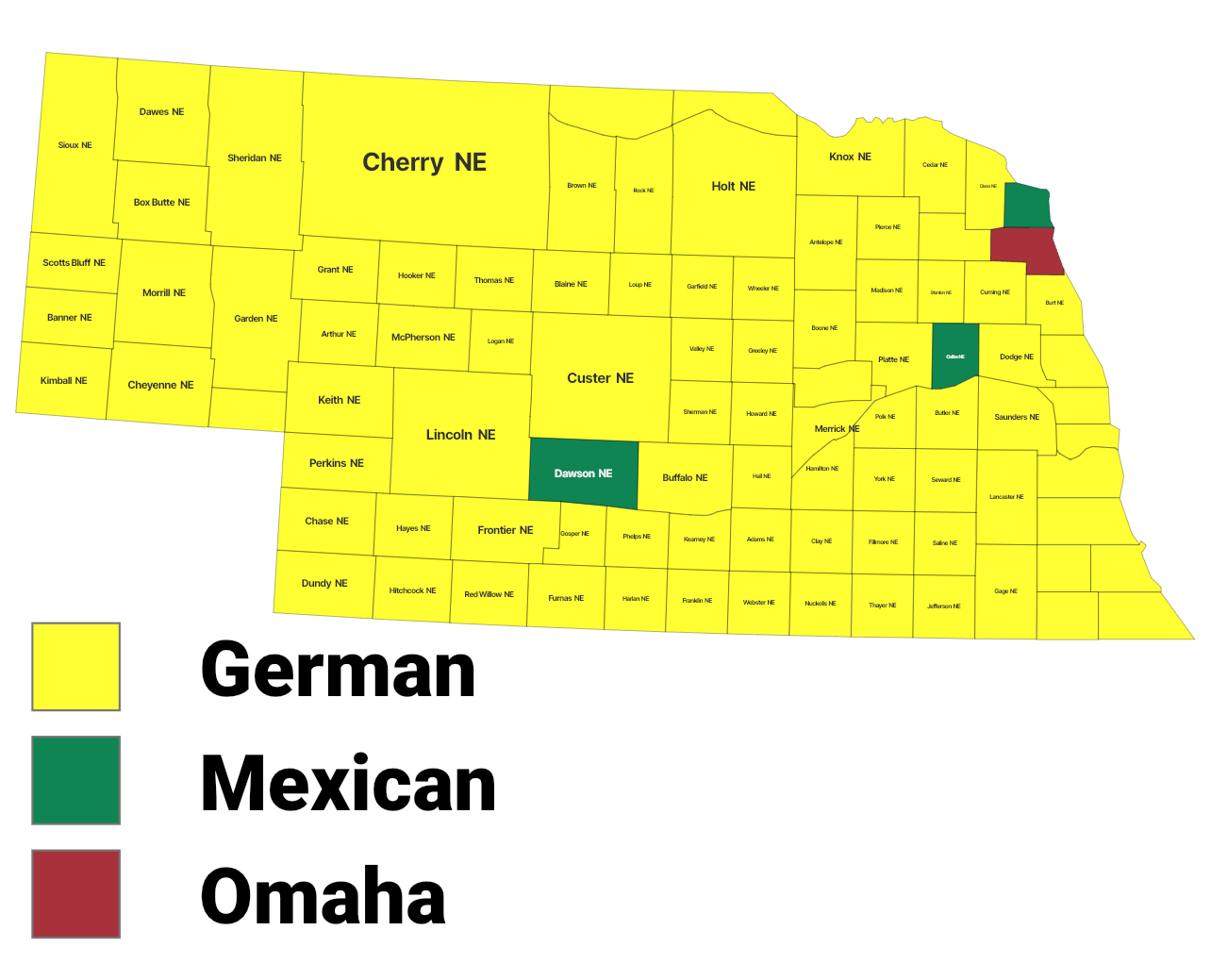
Largest alone or in any combination ethnic origin by county in Nebraska, per the 2020 census

As of the 2024 American Community Survey, there are 824,012 estimated households in Nebraska with an average of 2.38 persons per household. The state has a median household income of $76,376. Approximately 10.9% of the state's population lives at or below the poverty line. Nebraska has an estimated 65.9% employment rate, with 35.4% of the population holding a bachelor's degree or higher and 92.6% holding a high school diploma. There were 880,521 housing units at an average density of 11.46 per square mile (4.4/km^{2}).

The top five reported languages (people were allowed to report up to two languages, thus the figures will generally add to more than 100%) were English (86.0%), Spanish (9.3%), Indo-European (2.1%), Asian and Pacific Islander (1.6%), and Other (1.0%).

The median age in the state was 37.4 years.

Nebraska – racial and ethnic composition Note: the US Census treats Hispanic/Latino as an ethnic category. This table excludes Latinos from the racial categories and assigns them to a separate category. Hispanics/Latinos may be of any race.
Race / ethnicity (NH = non-Hispanic)	Pop. 1980	Pop. 1990	Pop. 2000	Pop. 2010	Pop. 2020	Pop. 2024
White alone (NH)	1,475,336 (93.98%)	1,460,095 (92.51%)	1,494,494 (87.33%)	1,499,753 (82.12%)	1,484,687 (75.69%)	1,506,104 (75.1%)
Black or African American alone (NH)	47,952 (3.05%)	56,711 (3.59%)	67,537 (3.95%)	80,959 (4.43%)	94,405 (4.81%)	—
Native American or Alaska Native alone (NH)	9,159 (0.58%)	11,719 (0.74%)	13,460 (0.79%)	14,797 (0.81%)	15,051 (0.77%)	—
Asian alone (NH)	6,973 (0.44%)	12,026 (0.76%)	21,677 (1.27%)	31,919 (1.75%)	52,359 (2.67%)	—
Pacific Islander alone (NH)	—	—	647 (0.04%)	966 (0.05%)	1,318 (0.07%)	—
Other race alone (NH)	2,380 (0.15%)	865 (0.05%)	1,327 (0.08%)	2,116 (0.12%)	6,335 (0.32%)	—
Mixed race or multiracial (NH)	—	—	17,696 (1.03%)	28,426 (1.56%)	72,634 (3.70%)	—
Hispanic or Latino (any race)	28,025 (1.79%)	36,969 (2.34%)	94,425 (5.52%)	167,405 (9.17%)	234,715 (11.97%)	272,743 (13.6%)
Total	1,569,825 (100.00%)	1,578,385 (100.00%)	1,711,263 (100.00%)	1,826,341 (100.00%)	1,961,504 (100.00%)	2,005,465 (100.00%)

=== 2024 estimate ===
As of the 2024 estimate, there were 2,005,465 people, 824,012 households, and _ families residing in the state. The population density was 26.11 inhabitants per square mile (10.1/km^{2}). There were 880,521 housing units at an average density of 11.46 per square mile (4.4/km^{2}). The racial makeup of the state was 86.5% White (75.1% NH White), 5.7% African American, 1.8% Native American, 3.1% Asian, 0.2% Pacific Islander, _% from some other races and 2.7% from two or more races. Hispanic or Latino people of any race were 13.6% of the population.

According to HUD's 2024 Annual Homeless Assessment Report (AHAR), there were an estimated 2,720 homeless people in Nebraska.

=== 2020 census ===
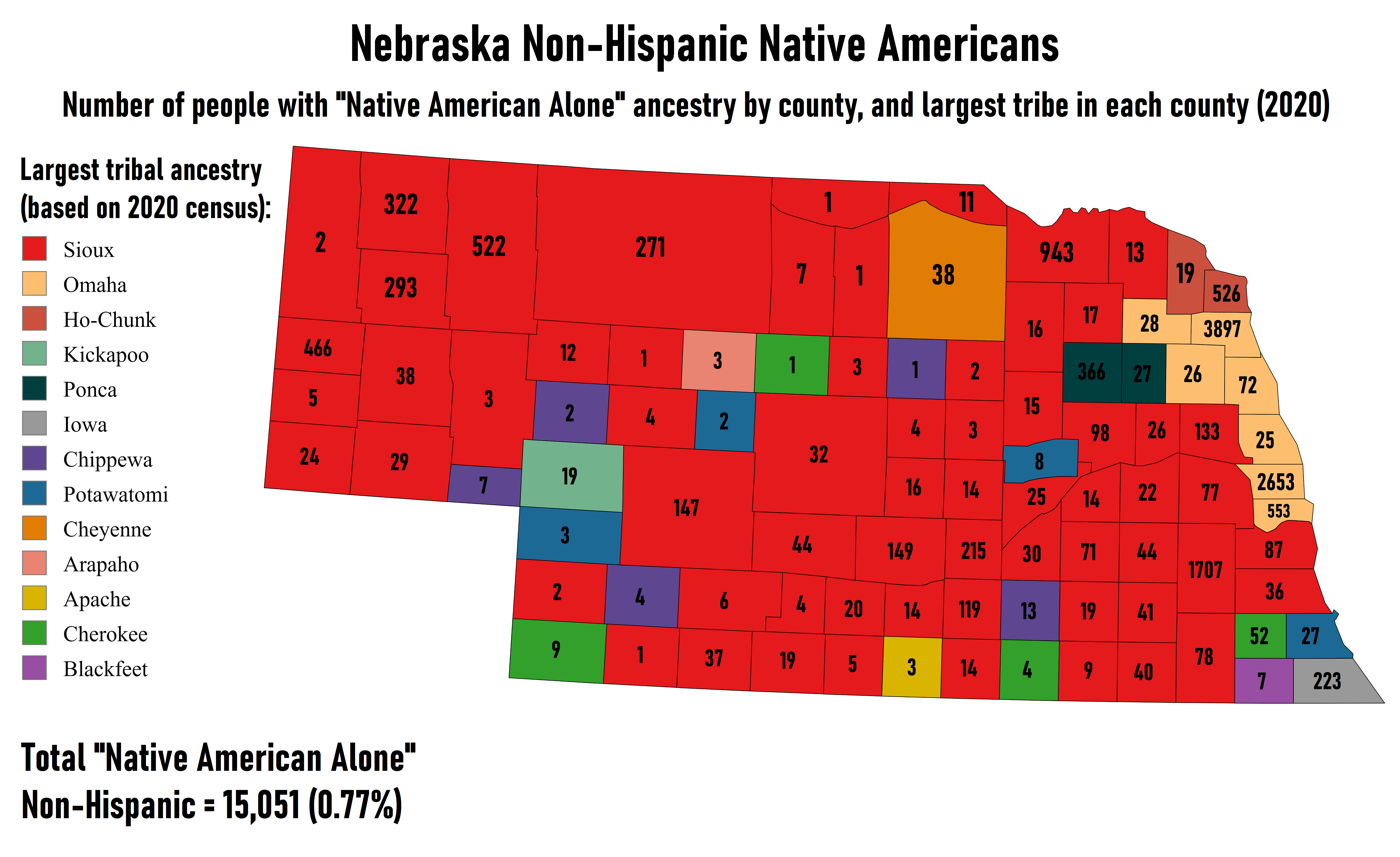
Largest Non-Hispanic Native American ancestry by county and numbers of people reporting "Native American Alone"

As of the 2020 census, there were 1,961,504 people, 773,312 households, and 493,998 families residing in the state. The population density was 25.54 inhabitants per square mile (9.9/km^{2}). There were 844,278 housing units at an average density of 10.99 per square mile (4.2/km^{2}). The racial makeup of the state was 78.41% White, 4.92% African American, 1.18% Native American, 2.70% Asian, 0.08% Pacific Islander, 5.36% from some other races and 7.35% from two or more races. Hispanic or Latino people of any race were 11.97% of the population.

The center of population of Nebraska is approximately 3.1 miles west of the village of Garrison (Butler County).

According to the 2016 American Community Survey, 10.2% of Nebraska's population were of Hispanic or Latino origin (of any race): Mexican (7.8%), Puerto Rican (0.2%), Cuban (0.2%), and other Hispanic or Latino origin (2.0%). The largest ancestry groups were: German (36.1%), Irish (13.1%), English (7.8%), Czech (4.7%), Swedish (4.3%), and Polish (3.5%).

=== 2010 census ===
As of the 2010 census, there were 1,826,341 people, 721,130 households, and 484,730 families residing in the state. The population density was 23.78 inhabitants per square mile (9.2/km^{2}). There were 796,793 housing units at an average density of 10.37 per square mile (4.0/km^{2}). The racial makeup of the state was 86.12% White, 4.54% African American, 1.01% Native American, 1.77% Asian, 0.07% Pacific Islander, 4.33% from some other races and 2.16% from two or more races. Hispanic or Latino people of any race were 9.17% of the population.

=== 2000 census ===
As of the 2000 census, there were 1,711,263 people, 666,184 households, and 443,411 families residing in the state. The population density was 22.28 inhabitants per square mile (8.6/km^{2}). There were 722,668 housing units at an average density of 9.41 per square mile (3.6/km^{2}). The racial makeup of the state was 89.60% White, 4.01% African American, 0.87% Native American, 1.28% Asian, 0.05% Pacific Islander, 2.80% from some other races and 1.40% from two or more races. Hispanic or Latino people of any race were 5.52% of the population. 38.6% were of German, 13.4% Irish, 9.6% English, 4.9% American, and 4.9% Czech ancestry.

=== 1960 to 1990 censuses ===
Nebraska historical racial composition
Racial composition	1950	1960	1970	1980	1990
White	98.18%	97.41%	96.59%	94.94%	93.80%
Black	1.45%	2.07%	2.69%	3.08%	3.64%
American Indian, Eskimo, and Aleut	0.30%	0.39%	0.45%	0.59%	0.79%
Asian and Pacific Islander	0.07%	0.09%	0.17%	0.45%	0.79%
Other race	0.01%	0.03%	0.10%	0.95%	0.99%
Hispanic origin (of any race)	—	—	—	1.79%	2.34%
Total	1,325,510	1,411,330	1,483,493	1,569,825	1,578,385

Nebraska has the largest Czech American and non-Mormon Danish American population (as a percentage of the total population) in the nation. Nebraska is also home to the largest Polish American population in the Great Plains. German Americans are the largest ancestry group in most of the state, particularly in the eastern counties. Thurston County (made up entirely of the Omaha and Winnebago reservations) has an American Indian majority, and Butler County is one of only two counties in the nation with a Czech-American plurality.

In recent years, Nebraska has become home to many refugee communities. In 2016, it welcomed more refugees per capita than any other state. Nebraska, and in particular Lincoln, is the largest home of Yazidis refugees and Yazidi Americans in the United States.

Notably, Nebraska was the last of all 50 states to maintain a ban on the issuance of driver's licenses to adults who had entered the United States illegally as children (also known as Dreamers). The state legislature lifted the ban in December 2016.

Mexico, India, China, Guatemala, and El Salvador are top countries of origin for Nebraska's immigrants.

=== Birth data ===
Map of counties in Nebraska by racial plurality, per the 2020 census Legend: | Non-Hispanic White 40–50% 50–60% 60–70% 70–80% 80–90% 90%+ | Native American 60–70% |

As of 2011, 31.0% of Nebraska's population younger than age one were minorities.

Live Births by Single Race/Ethnicity of Mother
Race	2014	2015	2016	2017	2018	2019	2020	2021	2022	2023	2024
White	19,471 (72.6%)	19,201 (72.0%)	18,729 (70.4%)	17,827 (69.0%)	17,645 (69.2%)	16,930 (68.4%)	16,433 (67.7%)	16,767 (68.1%)	16,120 (66.2%)	15,656 (64.9%)	15,860 (64.0%)
Black	2,015 (7.5%)	2,009 (7.5%)	1,685 (6.3%)	1,688 (6.5%)	1,739 (6.8%)	1,654 (6.7%)	1,631 (6.7%)	1,533 (6.2%)	1,597 (6.6%)	1,506 (6.2%)	1,482 (6.0%)
Asian	1,048 (3.9%)	987 (3.7%)	894 (3.4%)	861 (3.3%)	925 (3.6%)	857 (3.5%)	870 (3.6%)	861 (3.5%)	816 (3.4%)	823 (3.4%)	811 (3.3%)
American Indian	553 (2.1%)	557 (2.1%)	353 (1.3%)	399 (1.5%)	342 (1.3%)	341 (1.4%)	284 (1.2%)	248 (1.0%)	261 (1.1%)	297 (1.2%)	249 (1.0%)
Hispanic (any race)	4,143 (15.6%)	4,249 (15.9%)	4,282 (16.1%)	4,382 (17.0%)	4,155 (16.3%)	4,345 (17.6%)	4,393 (18.1%)	4,440 (18.0%)	4,815 (19.8%)	5,010 (20.8%)	5,598 (22.6%)
Total	26,794 (100%)	26,679 (100%)	26,589 (100%)	25,821 (100%)	25,488 (100%)	24,755 (100%)	24,291 (100%)	24,609 (100%)	24,345 (100%)	24,111 (100%)	24,785 (100%)

Note: For 2013–2015, births in the table add up to more than the total, because Hispanics are counted both by their ethnicity and by their race, giving a higher overall number. Since 2016, data for births of White Hispanic origin are not collected, but included in one Hispanic group; persons of Hispanic origin may be of any race.

=== Religion ===
Religion in Nebraska (2023-2024)
religion	percent
Protestant	53%
Catholic	20%
Other Christian	1%
Muslim	1%
Buddhist	1%
Unaffiliated	21%
Other faith	1%

The religious affiliations of the people of Nebraska are predominantly Christian, according to a 2014 survey by the Pew Research Center. At the 2020 Public Religion Research Institute survey, 73% of the population identified as Christian. At the 2014 Pew Research Center's survey, 20% of the population were religiously unaffiliated; in 2020, the Public Religion Research Institute determined 22% of the population became religiously unaffiliated. The 2023–24 Pew Research Center's Religious Landscape Study found that 74% of Nebraskans identified as Christians and 21% were religiously unaffiliated.

The largest single denominations by number of adherents in 2010 were the Roman Catholic Church (372,838), the Lutheran Church–Missouri Synod (112,585), the Evangelical Lutheran Church in America (110,110) and the United Methodist Church (109,283).

== Taxation ==
Nebraska has a progressive income tax. The portion of income from $0 to $2,400 is taxed at 2.56%; from $2,400 to $17,500, at 3.57%; from $17,500 to $27,000, at 5.12%; and income over $27,000, at 6.84%. The standard deduction for a single taxpayer is $5,700; the personal exemption is $118.

Nebraska has a state sales and use tax of 5.5%. In addition to the state tax, some Nebraska cities assess a city sales and use tax, in 0.5% increments, up to a maximum of 1.5%. Dakota County levies an additional 0.5% county sales tax. Food and ingredients that are generally for home preparation and consumption are not taxable. All real property within the state of Nebraska is taxable unless specifically exempted by statute. Since 1992, only depreciable personal property is subject to tax and all other personal property is exempt from tax. Inheritance tax is collected at the county level. As of July 2025, the state's gasoline tax is 49.70 cents per gallon.

== Economy ==
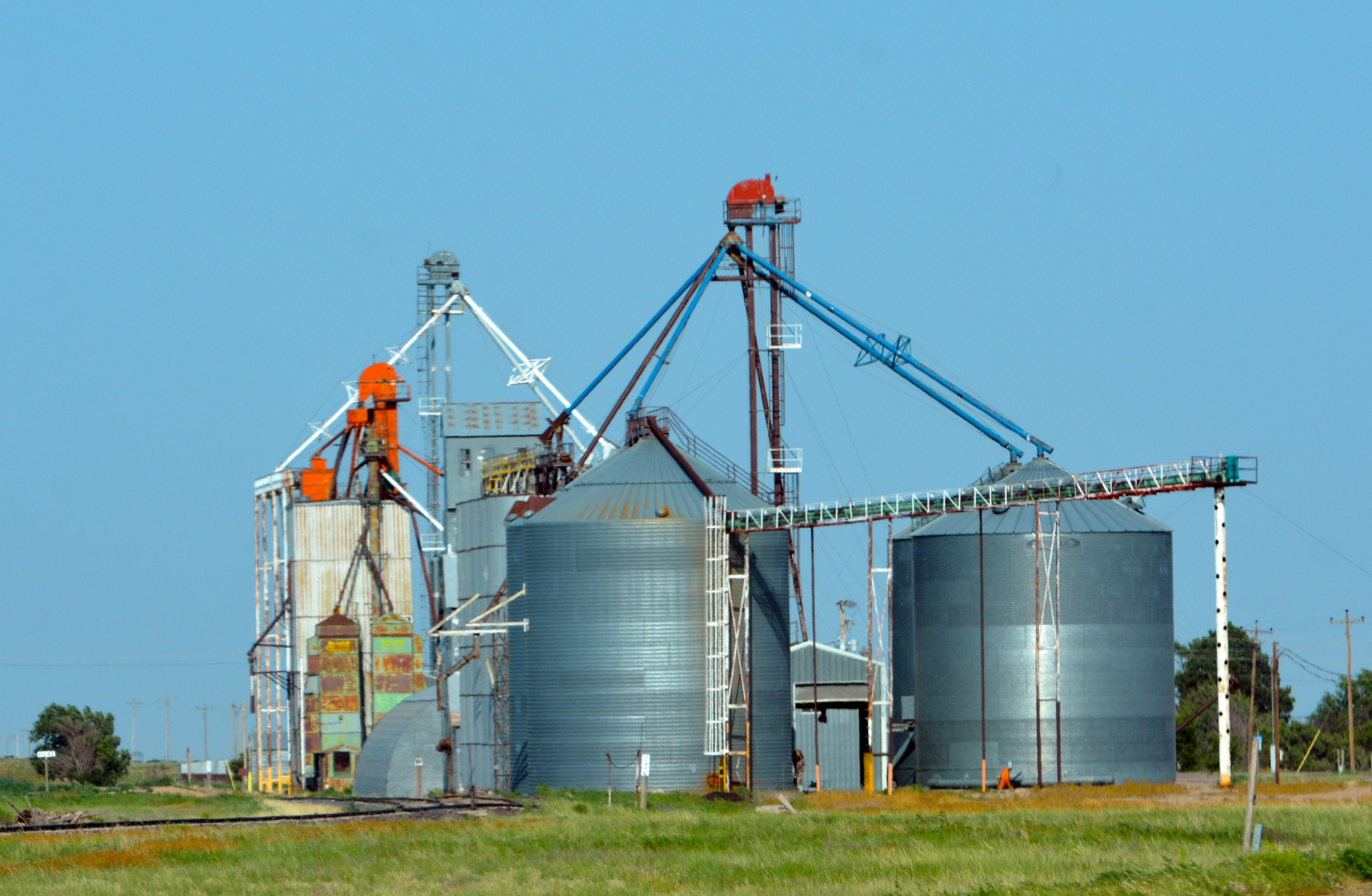
Nebraska grain bins and elevator

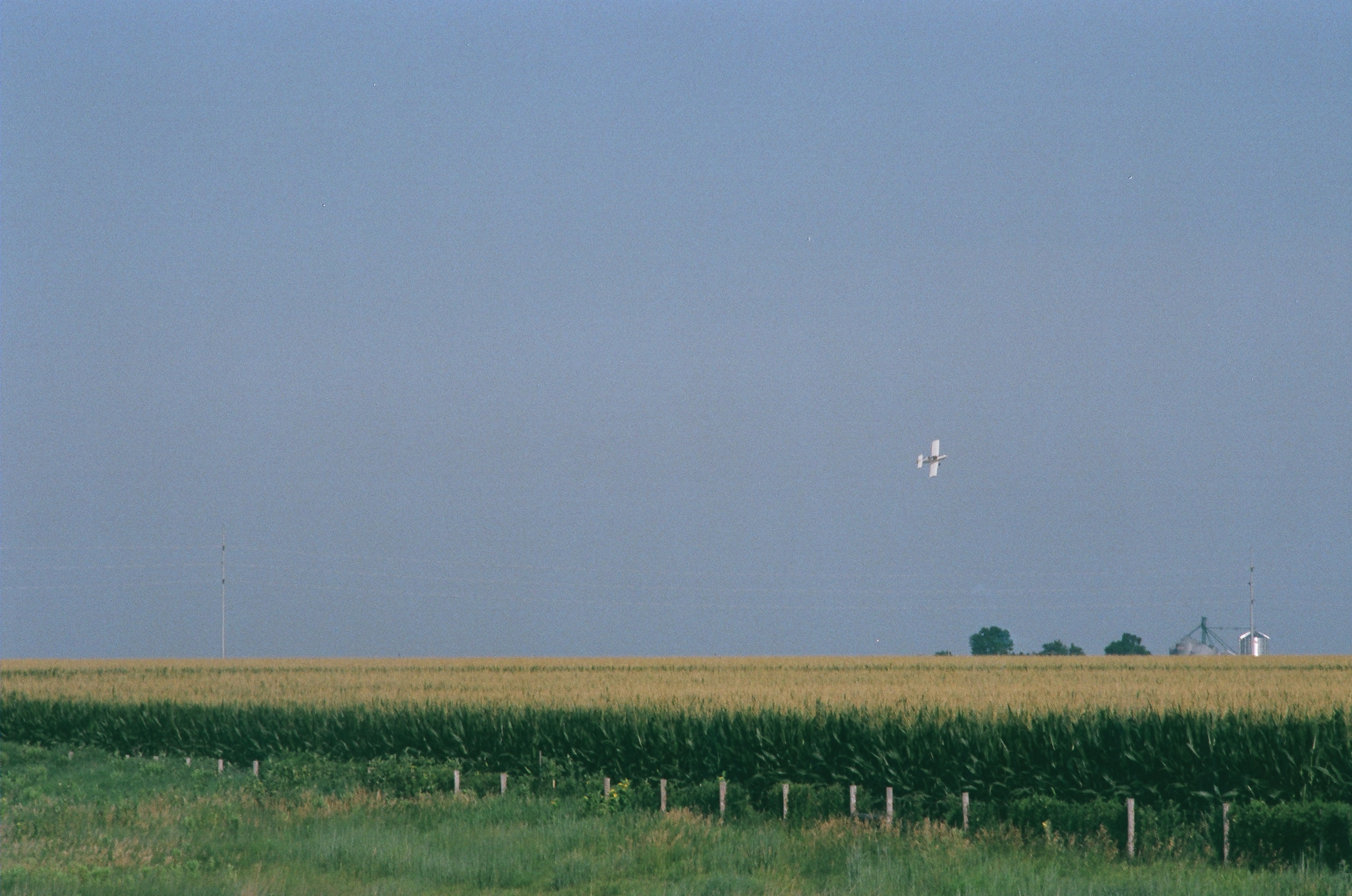
A cropduster in agrarian Nebraska, far west of Omaha

- Total employment (2023): 923,066
- Total employer establishments: 56,503

In 2025, the Bureau of Economic Analysis estimated Nebraska's gross state product was $198 billion. Nebraska's per capita personal income was $75,858 in 2025, ranked 19th in the nation. Nebraska has a large agriculture sector, and is a major producer of beef, pork, wheat, corn (maize), soybeans, and sorghum. Other important economic sectors include freight transport (by rail and truck), manufacturing, telecommunications, information technology, and insurance.

Small businesses made up 99.1% of Nebraska's businesses in 2025, and employed 47.5% of the state's work force.

In October 2021, Nebraska recorded an unemployment rate of 1.9%, the lowest ever recorded for any state. As of May 2025, the unemployment rate was 3%.

=== Industry ===
Kool-Aid was created in 1927 by Edwin Perkins in the city of Hastings, which celebrates the event the second weekend of every August with Kool-Aid Days, and Kool-Aid is the official soft drink of Nebraska. CliffsNotes were developed by Clifton Hillegass of Rising City. He adapted his pamphlets from the Canadian publications, Coles Notes.

Omaha is home to Berkshire Hathaway, whose chief executive officer (CEO), Warren Buffett, was ranked in March 2009 by Forbes magazine as the second-richest person in the world. The city is also home to Mutual of Omaha, West Corporation, Valmont Industries, Woodmen of the World, Kiewit Corporation, Union Pacific Railroad, and Gallup. Ameritas Life Insurance Corp., Nelnet, Sandhills Publishing Company, Duncan Aviation, and Hudl are based in Lincoln. The Buckle is based in Kearney. Sidney is the national headquarters for Cabela's, a specialty retailer of outdoor goods now owned by Bass Pro Shops. Grand Island is the headquarters of Hornady, a manufacturer of ammunition.

The world's largest train yard, Union Pacific's Bailey Yard, is in North Platte. The Vise-Grip was invented by William Petersen in 1924, and was manufactured in De Witt until the plant was closed and moved to China in late 2008.

Lincoln's Kawasaki Motors Manufacturing is the only Kawasaki plant in the world to produce the Jet Ski, all-terrain vehicle (ATV), and MULE product lines. The facility employs more than 1,200 people.

The Spade Ranch, in the Sandhills, is one of Nebraska's oldest and largest beef cattle operations.

=== Energy ===
Nebraska has been the nation's second-largest producer of ethanol biofuels. It has few fossil-fuel resources except for crude oil from the Niobrara Formation which underlays a portion of the state's western region. It hosts one uranium leach mining operation near its northwest border with Wyoming. It has an abundance of renewable generation resources, including untapped biomass generation potential from its productive agriculture industry. It has been a top-ten state for per-capita energy consumption due in large part to its energy-intensive agriculture, meat packing, and food processing industries.

Nebraska is the only state in the US where all electric utilities are publicly owned. Half of its electricity is generated from coal and the fastest-growing source in recent years has been wind. Nebraska has no renewable portfolio standard while supporting net metering.

== Transportation ==
=== Railroads ===
The Union Pacific Railroad, headquartered in Omaha, was incorporated on July 1, 1862, in the wake of the Pacific Railway Act of 1862. Bailey Yard, in North Platte, is the largest railroad classification yard in the world. The route of the original transcontinental railroad runs through the state.

Other major railroads with operations in the state are Amtrak; BNSF Railway; Canadian National Railway; and Iowa Interstate Railroad.

=== Roads and highways ===
Interstate Highways through the State of Nebraska

The U.S. Routes in Nebraska

=== Public transit ===
- Lincoln StarTran
- Omaha Metro Transit
- Scottsbluff Tri-City Roadrunner
- Sioux City Transit

=== Intercity bus service ===
- Burlington Trailways
- Express Arrow
- Jefferson Lines
- Panhandle Trails

== Law and government ==
Treemap of the popular vote by county, 2016 presidential election

The Government of Nebraska operates under the framework of the Nebraska Constitution, adopted in 1875, and is divided into three branches: executive, legislative, and judicial.

=== Executive branch ===
The head of the executive branch is Governor Jim Pillen (Republican). The Governor of Nebraska is the head of government of the U.S. state of Nebraska as provided by the fourth article of the Constitution of Nebraska. Other elected officials in the executive branch are Lieutenant Governor Joe Kelly, Attorney General Mike Hilgers, Secretary of State Bob Evnen, State Treasurer John Murante, and State Auditor Mike Foley. All elected officials in the executive branch serve four-year terms.

=== Legislative branch ===
Nebraska is the only state in the United States with a 'single-house' unicameral legislature. Although this house is officially known simply as the "Legislature", and more commonly called the "Unicameral", its members call themselves "senators". Nebraska's Legislature is also the only state legislature in the United States that is officially nonpartisan. The senators are elected with no party affiliation next to their names on the ballot, and members of any party can be elected to the positions of speaker and committee chairs. The Nebraska Legislature adopts and revises state legislation and can also override the governor's veto with a three-fifths majority, in contrast to the two-thirds majority required in some other states.

When Nebraska became a state in 1867, its legislature consisted of two houses: a House of Representatives and a Senate. For years, U.S. Senator George Norris (Senator 1913–1943) and other Nebraskans encouraged the idea of a unicameral legislature and demanded the issue be decided in a referendum. Norris argued:

The constitutions of our various states are built upon the idea that there is but one class. If this be true, there is no sense or reason in having the same thing done twice, especially if it is to be done by two bodies of men elected in the same way and having the same jurisdiction.

Unicameral supporters also argued that a bicameral legislature had a significant undemocratic feature in the committees that reconciled House and Senate legislation. Votes in these committees were secretive, and would sometimes add provisions to bills that neither house had approved. Nebraska's unicameral legislature today has rules that bills can contain only one subject, and must be given at least five days of consideration. In 1934, due in part to the budgetary pressure of the Great Depression, Nebraska citizens ran a state initiative to vote on a constitutional amendment creating a unicameral legislature, which was approved, which, in effect, abolished the House of Representatives (the lower house).

The Legislature meets in the third Nebraska State Capitol building, built between 1922 and 1932. It was designed by Bertram G. Goodhue. Built from Indiana limestone, the capitol's base is a cross within a square. A 400-foot (122 m) domed tower rises from this base. The Sower, a 19-foot (5.8 m) bronze statue representing agriculture, crowns the building.

=== Judicial branch ===
The judicial system in Nebraska is unified, with the Nebraska Supreme Court having administrative authority over all the courts within the state. Nebraska uses the Missouri Plan for the selection of judges at all levels, including county courts (as the lowest-level courts) and twelve district courts, which contain one or more counties. The Court of Appeals hears appeals from the district courts, juvenile courts, and workers' compensation courts.

=== Federal representation ===
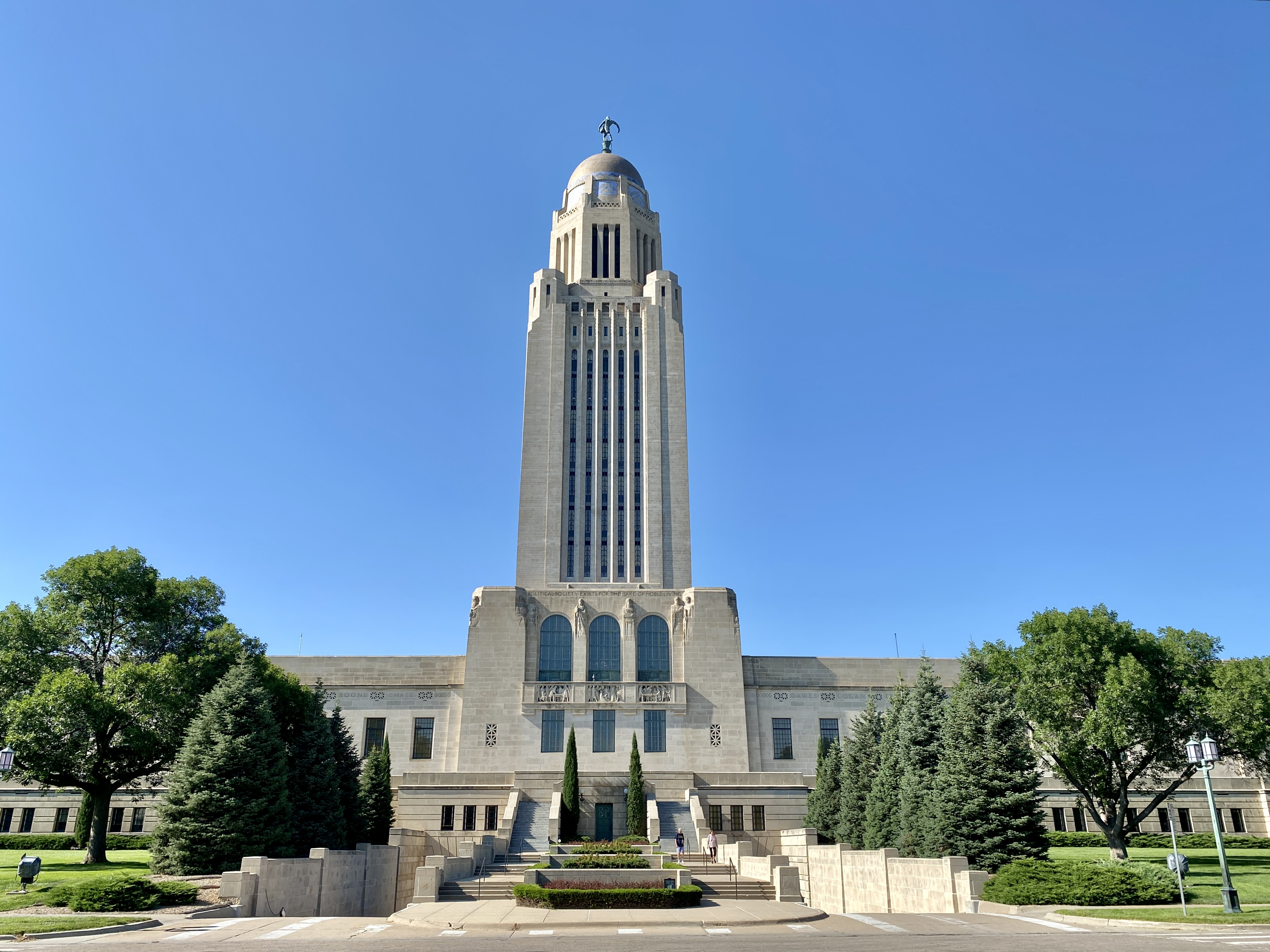
The Nebraska State Capitol in Lincoln

Nebraska is represented in the U.S. Senate by Republican Deb Fischer, who was first elected in 2012. Nebraska's other Senate seat is currently held by Pete Ricketts, who took office on January 23, 2023.

Nebraska has three representative seats in the U.S. House of Representatives. Until the next election, Nebraska's representatives are Mike Flood (R) of the 1st district, Don Bacon (R) of the 2nd district, and Adrian Smith (R) of the 3rd district.

Nebraska is one of two states (Maine is the other) that allow for a split in the state's allocation of electoral votes in presidential elections. Under a 1991 law, two of Nebraska's five votes are awarded to the winner of the statewide popular vote, while the other three go to the highest vote-getter in each of the state's three congressional districts.

=== Politics ===
For most of its history, Nebraska has been a solidly Republican state. Republicans have carried the state in all but one presidential election since 1940: the 1964 landslide election of Lyndon B. Johnson. In the 2004 presidential election, George W. Bush won the state's five electoral votes by a margin of 33 percentage points (making Nebraska's the fourth-strongest Republican vote among states) with 65.9% of the overall vote; only Thurston County, which is majority-Native American, voted for his Democratic challenger John Kerry. In 2008, the state split its electoral votes for the first time: Republican John McCain won the popular vote in Nebraska as a whole and two of its three congressional districts; the second district, which includes the city of Omaha, went for Democrat Barack Obama. Since then, the state has split its electoral vote twice, with the second district going for the Democratic Party candidates Joe Biden in 2020 and Kamala Harris in 2024.

Despite the current Republican domination of Nebraska politics, the state has a long tradition of electing centrist members of both parties to state and federal office; examples include George W. Norris (who served a few years in the Senate as an independent), J. James Exon, Bob Kerrey, and Chuck Hagel. Voters have tilted to the right in recent years, a trend evidenced when Hagel retired from the Senate in 2008 and was succeeded by conservative Republican Mike Johanns to the U.S. Senate, as well as with the 2006 re-election of Ben Nelson, who was considered the most conservative Democrat in the Senate until his retirement in 2013. Johanns retired in 2015 and was succeeded by Ben Sasse, while Nelson retired in 2013 and was succeeded by Deb Fischer, both conservative Republicans.

Though its politics are generally conservative, the state also has a history of progressive reform. Nebraska was the first U.S. state to outlaw sexual assault within a marriage, in 1975. In 1980, it became the first U.S. state to divest from South Africa to protest the racist system of apartheid.

Former President Gerald Ford was born in Nebraska but moved away shortly after birth. Illinois native William Jennings Bryan represented Nebraska in Congress, served as U.S. Secretary of State under President Woodrow Wilson, and unsuccessfully ran for president three times. Former Vice President Dick Cheney was born in Lincoln but moved to Casper, Wyoming.

Political Party	Number of registered voters (March 1, 2026)	Percent
Republican	620,082	49.44%
Democratic	326,468	26.03%
Independent	279,846	22.31%
Libertarian	17,638	1.41%
Legal Marijuana Now	10,254	0.82%
Total	1,254,288	100.00%

United States presidential election results for Nebraska
Year	Republican		Democratic		Third party(ies)	
Year	No.	%	No.	%	No.	%
1868	9,772	63.91%	5,519	36.09%	0	0.00%
1872	18,329	70.68%	7,603	29.32%	0	0.00%
1876	31,915	64.70%	17,413	35.30%	0	0.00%
1880	54,979	62.87%	28,523	32.62%	3,950	4.52%
1884	76,912	57.31%	54,391	40.53%	2,899	2.16%
1888	108,425	53.51%	80,552	39.75%	13,655	6.74%
1892	87,213	43.56%	24,943	12.46%	88,036	43.98%
1896	103,064	46.18%	115,007	51.53%	5,111	2.29%
1900	121,835	50.46%	114,013	47.22%	5,582	2.31%
1904	138,558	61.38%	52,921	23.44%	34,253	15.17%
1908	126,997	47.60%	131,099	49.14%	8,703	3.26%
1912	54,226	21.74%	109,008	43.69%	86,249	34.57%
1916	117,771	40.99%	158,827	55.28%	10,717	3.73%
1920	247,498	64.66%	119,608	31.25%	15,637	4.09%
1924	218,585	47.09%	137,289	29.58%	108,299	23.33%
1928	345,745	63.19%	197,959	36.18%	3,440	0.63%
1932	201,177	35.29%	359,082	62.98%	9,878	1.73%
1936	247,731	40.74%	347,445	57.14%	12,847	2.11%
1940	352,201	57.19%	263,677	42.81%	0	0.00%
1944	329,880	58.58%	233,246	41.42%	0	0.00%
1948	264,774	54.15%	224,165	45.85%	1	0.00%
1952	421,603	69.15%	188,057	30.85%	0	0.00%
1956	378,108	65.51%	199,029	34.49%	0	0.00%
1960	380,553	62.07%	232,542	37.93%	0	0.00%
1964	276,847	47.39%	307,307	52.61%	0	0.00%
1968	321,163	59.82%	170,784	31.81%	44,904	8.36%
1972	406,298	70.50%	169,991	29.50%	0	0.00%
1976	359,705	59.19%	233,692	38.46%	14,271	2.35%
1980	419,937	65.53%	166,851	26.04%	54,066	8.44%
1984	460,054	70.55%	187,866	28.81%	4,170	0.64%
1988	398,447	60.15%	259,646	39.20%	4,279	0.65%
1992	344,346	46.58%	217,344	29.40%	177,593	24.02%
1996	363,467	53.65%	236,761	34.95%	77,187	11.39%
2000	433,862	62.25%	231,780	33.25%	31,377	4.50%
2004	512,814	65.90%	254,328	32.68%	11,044	1.42%
2008	452,979	56.53%	333,319	41.60%	14,983	1.87%
2012	475,064	59.80%	302,081	38.03%	17,234	2.17%
2016	495,961	58.75%	284,494	33.70%	63,777	7.55%
2020	556,846	58.22%	374,583	39.17%	24,954	2.61%
2024	564,816	59.32%	369,995	38.86%	17,371	1.82%

== Education ==
=== Colleges and universities ===
University of Nebraska system

- University of Nebraska–Lincoln
- University of Nebraska at Kearney
- University of Nebraska at Omaha
- University of Nebraska Medical Center
- Nebraska College of Technical Agriculture

Nebraska State College System

- Chadron State College
- Peru State College
- Wayne State College

Community Colleges

- Central Community College
- Little Priest Tribal College
- Metropolitan Community College
- Mid-Plains Community College
- Nebraska Indian Community College
- Northeast Community College
- Southeast Community College
- Western Nebraska Community College

Private colleges/universities

- Bellevue University
- Clarkson College
- College of Saint Mary
- Concordia University
- Creighton University
- Doane University
- Grace University
- Hastings College
- Midland University
- Nebraska Christian College
- Nebraska Methodist College
- Nebraska Wesleyan University
- Summit Christian College
- Union Adventist University
- York College

== Culture ==
=== Arts ===
Museums

Performing arts

- Lied Center for Performing Arts, in Lincoln
- Orpheum Theatre, in Omaha
- Holland Performing Arts Center, in Omaha
- Omaha Community Playhouse, in Omaha
- Rose Blumkin Performing Arts Center, in Omaha
- Blue Barn Theatre, in Omaha
- Omaha Symphony

=== Sports ===
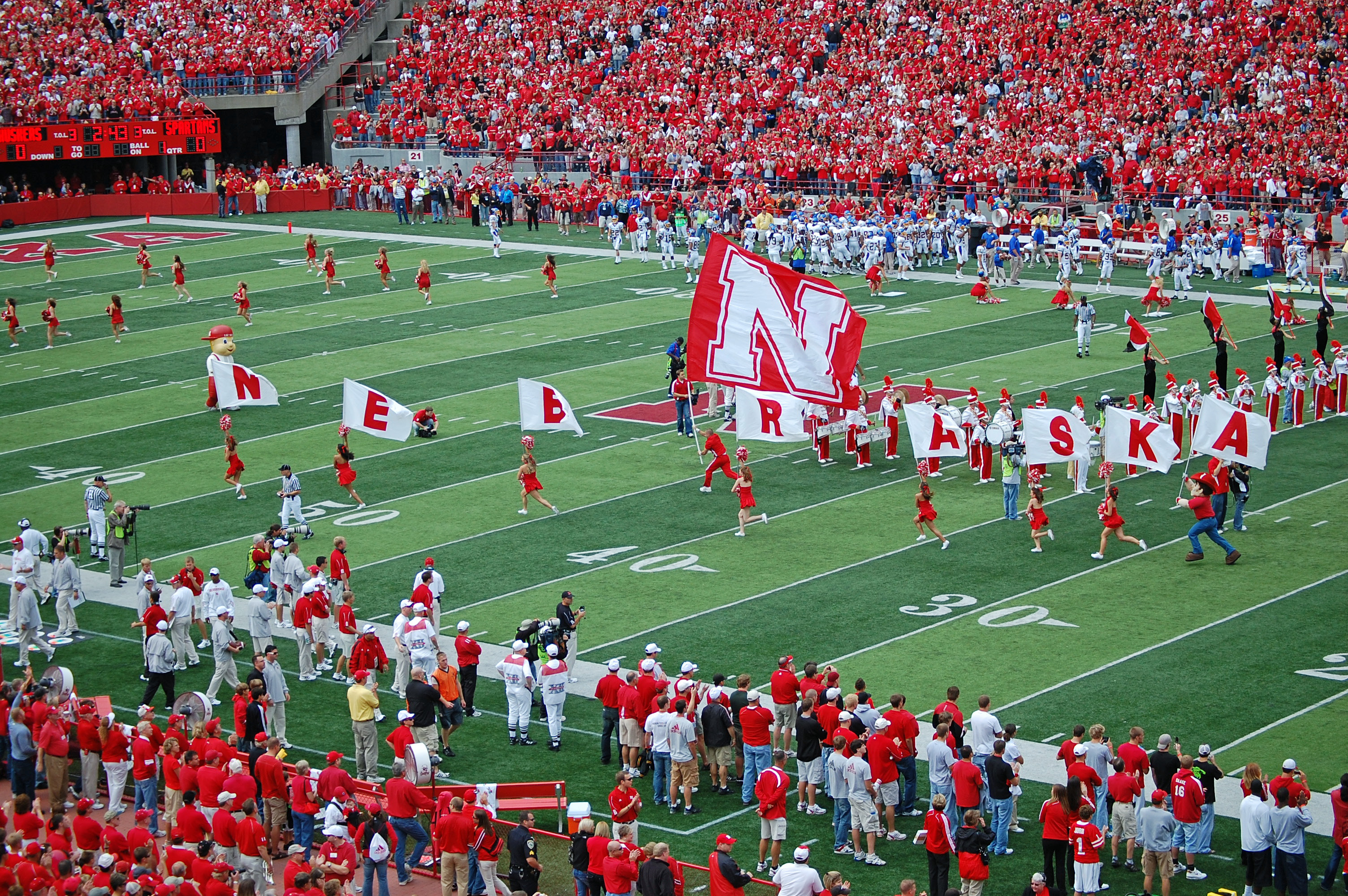
Football game at the University of Nebraska on September 6, 2008

==== Professional sports ====
Team	Home	First game	Sport	League
Omaha Supernovas	Omaha	January 24, 2024	Volleyball	Pro Volleyball Federation
Union Omaha	Omaha	July 25, 2020	Soccer	USL League One
Omaha Storm Chasers	Omaha	1969	Baseball (minor league) (Triple-A)	International League
Nebraska Stampede	Ralston	April 10, 2010	Football (women's)	Women's Football Alliance
Lincoln Saltdogs	Lincoln	May 2001	Baseball (independent)	American Association
Omaha Beef	Omaha	May 2000	Football (indoor)	Champions Indoor Football

==== Junior-level sports ====
Club	Sport	League	Founded
Lincoln Stars	Ice hockey	United States Hockey League	1996
Omaha Lancers	Ice hockey	United States Hockey League	1986
Tri-City Storm	Ice hockey	United States Hockey League	2000
No Coast Derby Girls	Roller derby	Women's Flat Track Derby Association	2005
Omaha Rollergirls	Roller derby	Women's Flat Track Derby Association	2006

==== College sports ====
Nebraska is currently home to seven member schools of the NCAA, eight of the NAIA, seven of the NJCAA, one of the NCCAA, and one independent school.

The College World Series has been held in Omaha since 1950. It was held at Rosenblatt Stadium from 1950 through 2010, and has been domiciled at Charles Schwab Field Omaha since 2011.

== See also ==
- Index of Nebraska-related articles
- Outline of Nebraska

== Bibliography ==
=== Surveys ===
- The Encyclopedia of Nebraska (1999) online
- Andreas, Alfred T., History of the State of Nebraska (1882) (a highly detailed history)
- Archer, J. Clark, et al. Atlas of Nebraska. (U of Nebraska Press, 2017). Pp. xxii+ 214, color maps, illustrations, photographs, charts, graphs, bibliography. online review Archived March 8, 2021, at the Wayback Machine
- Creigh, Dorothy Weyers. Nebraska: A Bicentennial History (1977)
- Faulkner, Virginia, ed. Roundup: A Nebraska Reader (1957)
- Chokecherry Places, Essays from the High Plains, Merrill Gilfillan, Johnson Press, Boulder, Colorado, trade paperback, ISBN 1-55566-227-7.
- Hickey, Donald R. Nebraska Moments: Glimpses of Nebraska's Past (1992).
- Miewald, Robert D., Nebraska Government & Politics Archived May 25, 2012, at the Wayback Machine (1984)
- Luebke Frederick C. Nebraska: An Illustrated History (1995)
- Naugle, Ronald C., John J. Montag, and James C. Olson. History of Nebraska (4th ed. U of Nebraska Press, 2015). 568 pp. online review Archived March 8, 2021, at the Wayback Machine
- Wishart, David J. ed. Encyclopedia of the Great Plains, University of Nebraska Press, 2004, ISBN 0-8032-4787-7. complete text online Archived November 6, 2011, at the Wayback Machine; 900 pages of scholarly articles
- Nebraska: A Guide to the Cornhusker State, WPA Guide, 1939; scanned online edition Archived August 6, 2020, at the Wayback Machine

=== Scholarly special studies ===
- Barnhart, John D. "Rainfall and the Populist Party in Nebraska". American Political Science Review 19 (1925): 527–40. in JSTOR
- Beezley, William H. "Homesteading in Nebraska, 1862–1872", Nebraska History 53 (spring 1972): 59–75
- Bentley, Arthur F. "The Condition of the Western Farmer as Illustrated by the Economic History of a Nebraska Township". Johns Hopkins University Studies in Historical and Political Science 11 (1893): 285–370
- Cherny, Robert W. Populism, Progressivism, and the Transformation of Nebraska Politics, 1885–1915 (1981) Archived May 25, 2012, at the Wayback Machine
- Bogue Allen G. Money at Interest: The Farm Mortgage on the Middle Border (1955)
- Brunner, Edmund de S. Immigrant Farmers and Their Children (1929)
- Chudacoff, Howard P. Mobile Americans: Residential and Social Mobility in Omaha, 1880–1920 (1972)
  - Chudacoff, Howard P. "A New Look at Ethnic Neighborhoods: Residential Dispersion and the Concept of Visibility in a Medium-sized City". Journal of American History 60 (1973): 76–93. about Omaha; in JSTOR
- Coletta, Paolo E. William Jennings Bryan. Archived May 25, 2012, at the Wayback Machine 3 vols. (1964–69)
- Dick, Everett. The Sod-House Frontier: 1854–1890 (1937)
- Farragher, John Mack. Women and Men on the Overland Trail (1979)
- Fuller, Wayne E. The Old Country School: The Story of Rural Education in the Midwest (1982)
- Grant, Michael Johnston. "Down and Out on the Family Farm" (2002)
- Harper, Ivy. Walzing Matilda: Life and Times of Nebraska Senator Robert Kerrey (1992)
- Holter, Don W. Flames on the Plains: A History of United Methodism in Nebraska (1983)
- Jeffrey, Julie Roy. Frontier Women: The Trans-Mississippi West, 1840–1880 (1979)
- Klein, Maury. Union Pacific: The Birth of a Railroad, 1862–1893 (1986)
- Klein, Maury (2006) [1989]. Union Pacific: Volume II, 1894-1969. Minneapolis, Minnesota: University of Minnesota Press. ISBN 978-0-8166-4460-5.
- Larsen, Lawrence H. The Gate City: A History of Omaha (1982)
- Lowitt, Richard. George W. Norris 3 vols. (1971)
- Luebke, Frederick C. Immigrants and Politics: The Germans of Nebraska, 1880–1900 (1969)
- Luebke, Frederick C. "The German-American Alliance in Nebraska, 1910–1917". Nebraska History 49 (1969): 165–85
- Olson, James C. J. Sterling Morton (1942)
- Overton, Richard C. Burlington West: A Colonization History of the Burlington Railroad (1941)
- Parsons Stanley B. "Who Were the Nebraska Populists?" Nebraska History 44 (1963): 83–99
- Pierce, Neal. The Great Plains States (1973)
- Pederson, James F., and Kenneth D. Wald. Shall the People Rule? A History of the Democratic Party in Nebraska Politics (1972)
- Riley, Glenda. The Female Frontier. A Comparative View of Women on the Prairie and the Plains (1978)
- Wenger, Robert W. "The Anti-Saloon League in Nebraska Politics, 1898–1910". Nebraska History 52 (1971): 267–92

Preceded by Nevada	List of U.S. states by date of statehood Admitted on March 1, 1867 (37th)	Succeeded by Colorado
