= Meadowlark =

Group of birds

Meadowlarks are grassland birds belonging to genera Sturnella and Leistes.

This group includes seven species of largely insectivorous grassland birds. In all species the male at least has a black or brown back and extensively red or yellow underparts.

== List of species ==
There is disagreement among authorities as to whether Lilian's meadowlark should be ranked as a full species or a subspecies.

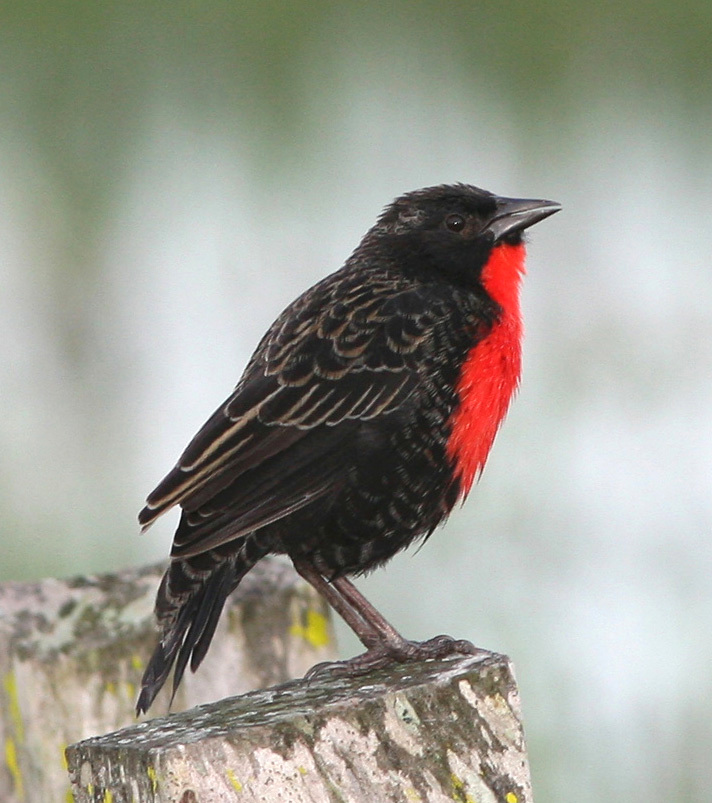
Red-breasted meadowlark (Leistes militaris)

Red-breasted species, predominantly South American

- Red-breasted meadowlark (formerly red-breasted blackbird), Leistes militaris
- White-browed meadowlark (formerly white-browed blackbird), Leistes superciliaris
- Peruvian meadowlark, Leistes bellicosus
- Pampas meadowlark, Leistes defilippii
- Long-tailed meadowlark, Leistes loyca

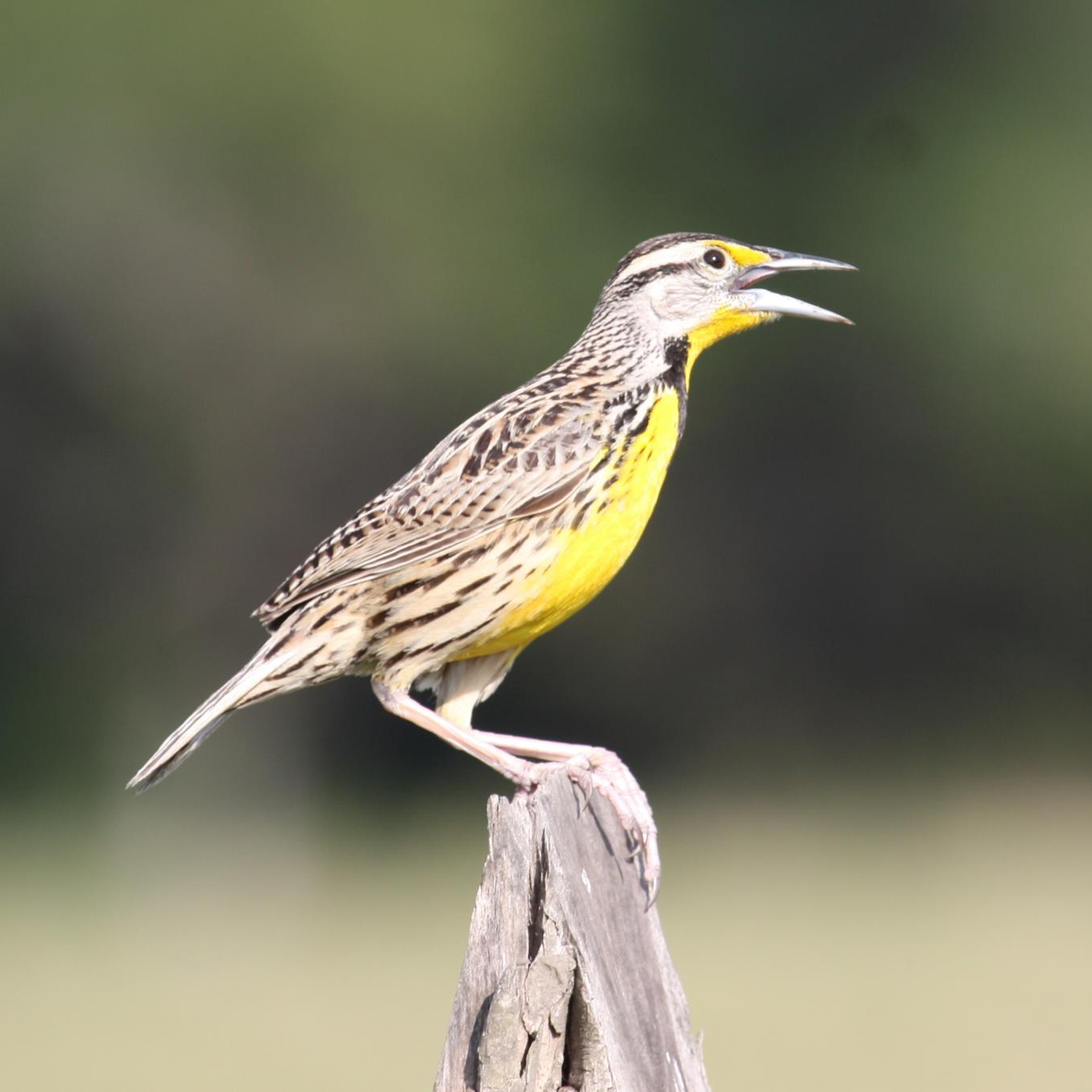
Eastern meadowlark (Sturnella magna)

Yellow-breasted species, predominantly North American

- Eastern meadowlark, Sturnella magna
- Chihuahuan meadowlark, Sturnella lilianae
- Western meadowlark, Sturnella neglecta

== Taxonomy ==
As a group, the meadowlarks have had a volatile taxonomic history. When Carl Linnaeus described the eastern meadowlark (the first of the meadowlarks to be scientifically described) in his 10th edition of Systema Naturae in 1758, he thought it was related to the Old World larks, and so put it in the genus Alauda with them. In the same work, he put the red-breasted meadowlark in the bunting genus Emberiza. Less than a decade later, he described the eastern meadowlark again, this time putting it into the starling genus Sturnus, which Juan Ignacio Molina also used when he first described the long-tailed meadowlark in 1782. In 1816, Louis Pierre Vieillot created the genus Sturnella, moving the meadowlarks into his new taxon. Most taxonomists accepted the new genus, and the western meadowlark, Peruvian meadowlark and Lilian's meadowlark were all placed in this taxon when they were later described. When Charles Lucien Bonaparte described the white-browed meadowlark and pampas meadowlark, however, he assigned them to another newly created genus — Trupialis, for what he called "ground-starlings"; he moved the red-breasted meadowlark into that now-defunct genus as well.

By the early 20th century, the meadowlarks were split again. Only the "yellow-breasted" meadowlarks (eastern and western meadowlarks, including Lilian's) remained in the genus Sturnella. The red-breasted and white-browed meadowlarks were moved to the genus Leistes, while the pampas meadowlark, Peruvian meadowlark and long-tailed meadowlark made up the genus Pezites, which was established by Cabanis in 1851. By the late 20th century, all meadowlarks were lumped again in the genus Sturnella. In 2017, all the red-breasted species were moved to the genus Leistes.
