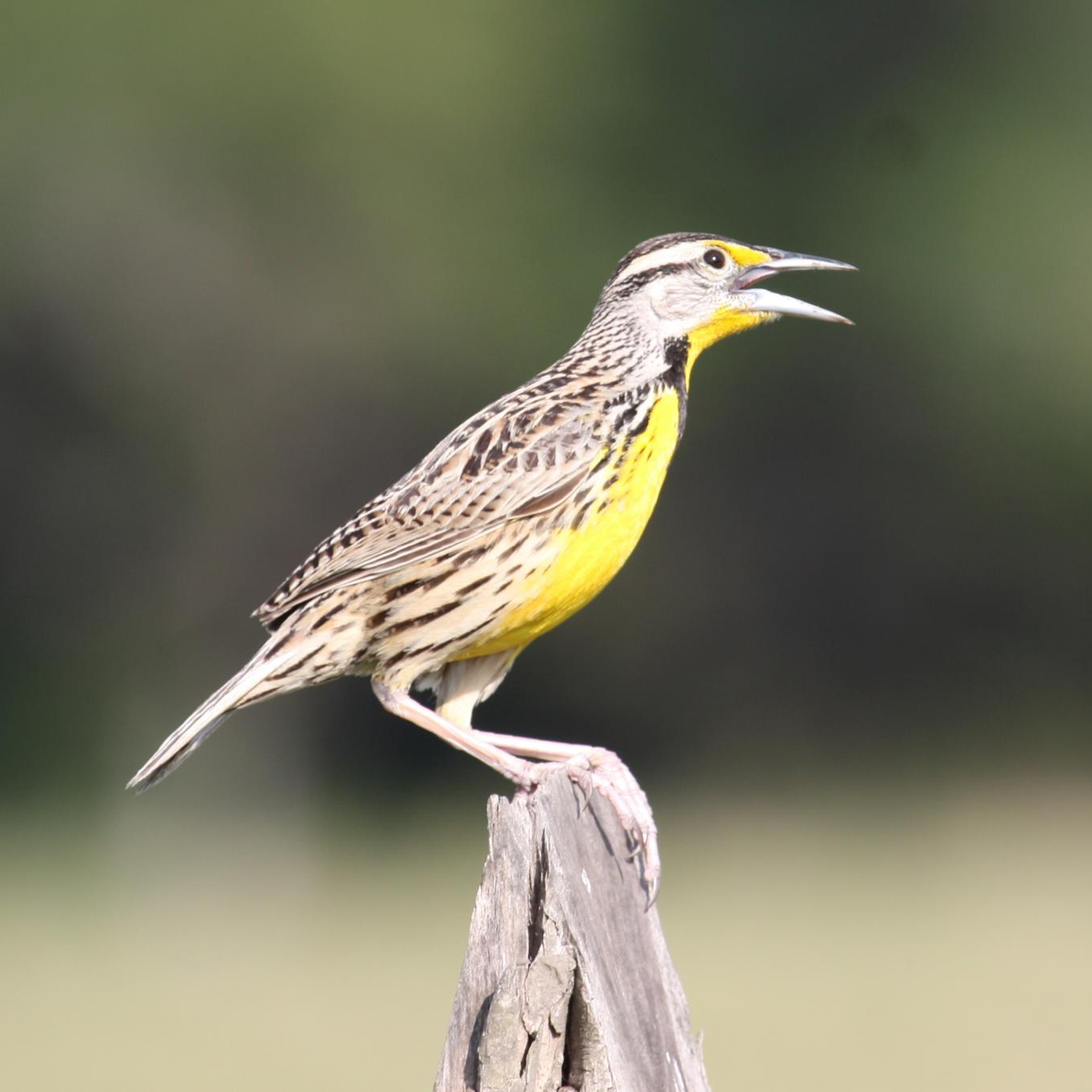
- Eastern meadowlark (Sturnella magna)

Scientific classification
- Kingdom: Animalia
- Phylum: Chordata
- Class: Aves
- Order: Passeriformes
- Family: Icteridae
- Genus: Sturnella; Vieillot, 1816

Type species
- Alauda magna Linnaeus, 1758

Species
- See text

= Sturnella =

Genus of birds

The genus Sturnella are North American grassland passerine birds called meadowlarks. The genus was previously lumped with the South American meadowlarks now placed in the genus Leistes.

It includes two or three species of largely insectivorous grassland birds. In all species, the male has at least a black or brown back and extensively yellow underparts.

== Taxonomy and list of species ==
The genus Sturnella was introduced in 1816 by the French ornithologist Louis Pierre Vieillot with the eastern meadowlark (Sturnella magna) as the type species. The name Sturnella is a diminutive of the Latin sturnus meaning "starling".

By the early 20th century, the meadowlarks were split. Only the "yellow-breasted" meadowlarks (eastern and western meadowlarks, including Lilian's) remained in the genus Sturnella. The red-breasted and white-browed meadowlarks were moved to the genus Leistes, while the pampas meadowlark, Peruvian meadowlark and long-tailed meadowlark made up the genus Pezites, which was established by Cabanis in 1851. By the late 20th century, all meadowlarks were lumped in the genus Sturnella. In 2017, all the red-breasted meadowlarks were merged into the genus Leistes.

The genus contains the following three species:

Genus Sturnella – Vieillot, 1816 – three species
Common name	Scientific name and subspecies	Range	Size and ecology	IUCN status and estimated population
Eastern meadowlark	Sturnella magna (Linnaeus, 1758) Fourteen subspecies: S. m. magna (Linnaeus, 1758); S. m. argutula Bangs, 1899; S. m. hoopesi Stone, 1897; S. m. saundersi Dickerman & Phillips, AR, 1970; S. m. alticola Nelson, 1900; S. m. mexicana Sclater, PL, 1861; S. m. griscomi Van Tyne & Trautman, 1941; S. m. inexspectata Ridgway, 1888; S. m. subulata Griscom, 1934; S. m. meridionalis Sclater, PL, 1861; S. m. paralios Bangs, 1901; S. m. praticola Chubb, C, 1921; S. m. monticola Chubb, C, 1921; S. m. hippocrepis (Wagler, 1832)	eastern North America to northern South America	Size: Habitat: Diet:	NT
Chihuahuan meadowlark	Sturnella lilianae Oberholser, 1930 Two subspecies: Sturnella lilianae lilianae Oberholser, 1930; Sturnella lilianae auropectoralis Saunders, GB, 1934	northern Mexico and the southwestern portion of the United States	Size: Habitat: Diet:	LC
Western meadowlark	Sturnella neglecta (Audubon, 1844) Two subspecies: S. n. neglecta Audubon, 1844; S. n. confluenta Rathbun, 1917	western and central North America.	Size: Habitat: Diet:	LC
