= Dicrodon holmbergi =

Conservation status
- Data Deficient (IUCN 3.1)

Scientific classification
- Kingdom: Animalia
- Phylum: Chordata
- Class: Reptilia
- Order: Squamata
- Family: Teiidae
- Genus: Dicrodon
- Species: D. holmbergi

Binomial name
- Dicrodon holmbergi Schmidt, 1957

Species of lizard

Dicrodon holmbergi, also known commonly as Holmberg's desert tegu , is a species of lizard in the family Teiidae. The species is endemic to Peru.

== Etymology ==
The specific name, holmbergi, is in honor of American anthropologist Allan R. Holmberg (1909–1966), who collected the holotype in 1947 during his ethnological investigations in Peru.

== Geographic range ==
D. holmbergi is found in western Peru, in the regions of Ancash, La Libertad, and Lambayeque.

== Habitat ==
The preferred natural habitat of D. holmbergi is desert, at altitudes around 220 m (720 ft).

== Behavior ==
D. holmbergi is terrestrial.

== Diet ==
Adults of D. holmbergi are mainly herbivorous.

== Reproduction ==
D. holmbergi is oviparous.
