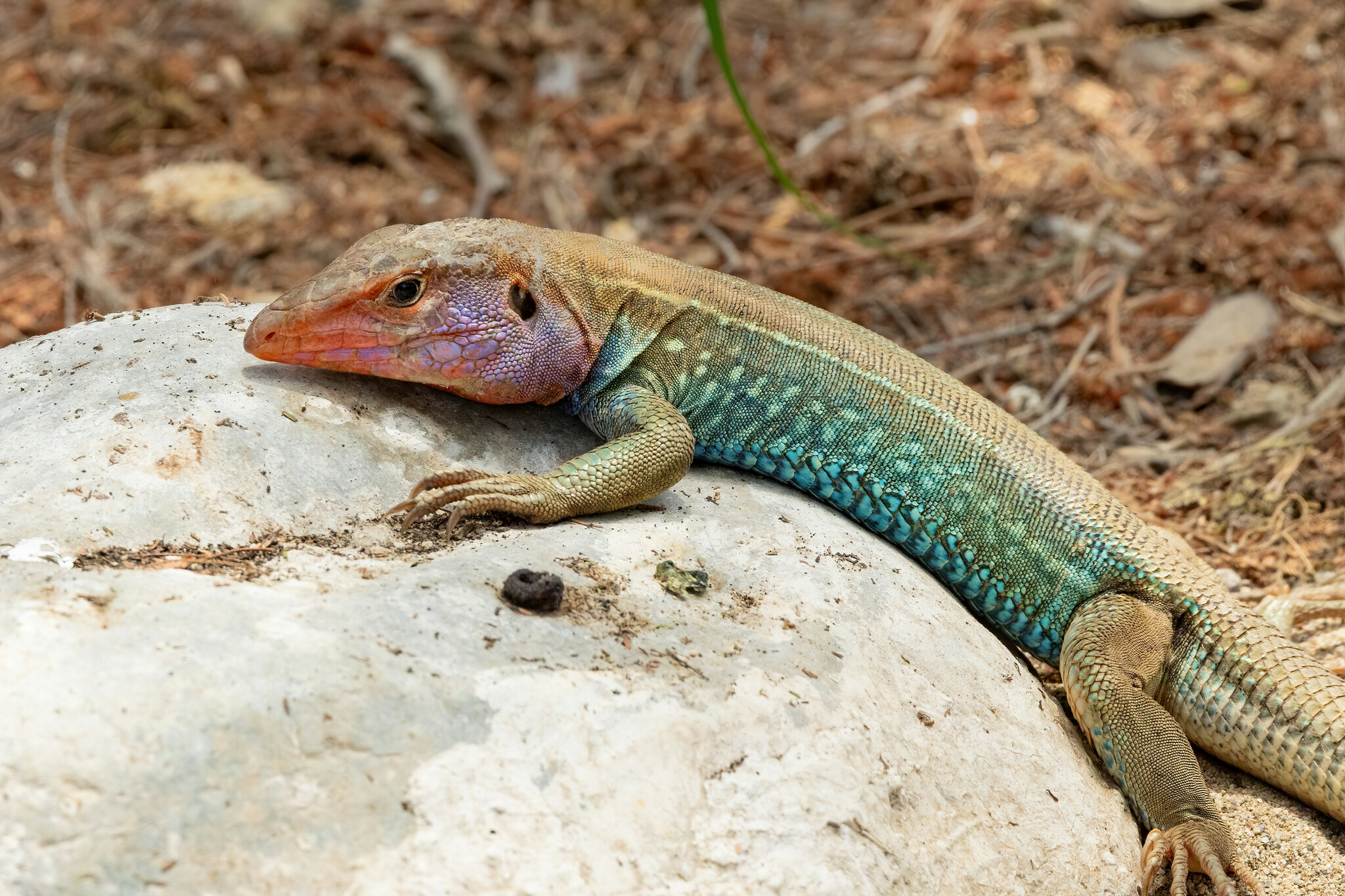

Conservation status
- Least Concern (IUCN 3.1)

Scientific classification
- Kingdom: Animalia
- Phylum: Chordata
- Class: Reptilia
- Order: Squamata
- Suborder: Lacertoidea
- Family: Teiidae
- Genus: Dicrodon
- Species: D. heterolepis

Binomial name
- Dicrodon heterolepis (Tschudi, 1845)

= Dicrodon heterolepis =

Species of lizard

Dicrodon heterolepis, the Ecuador desert tegu , is a species of teiid lizard endemic to coastal Peru.

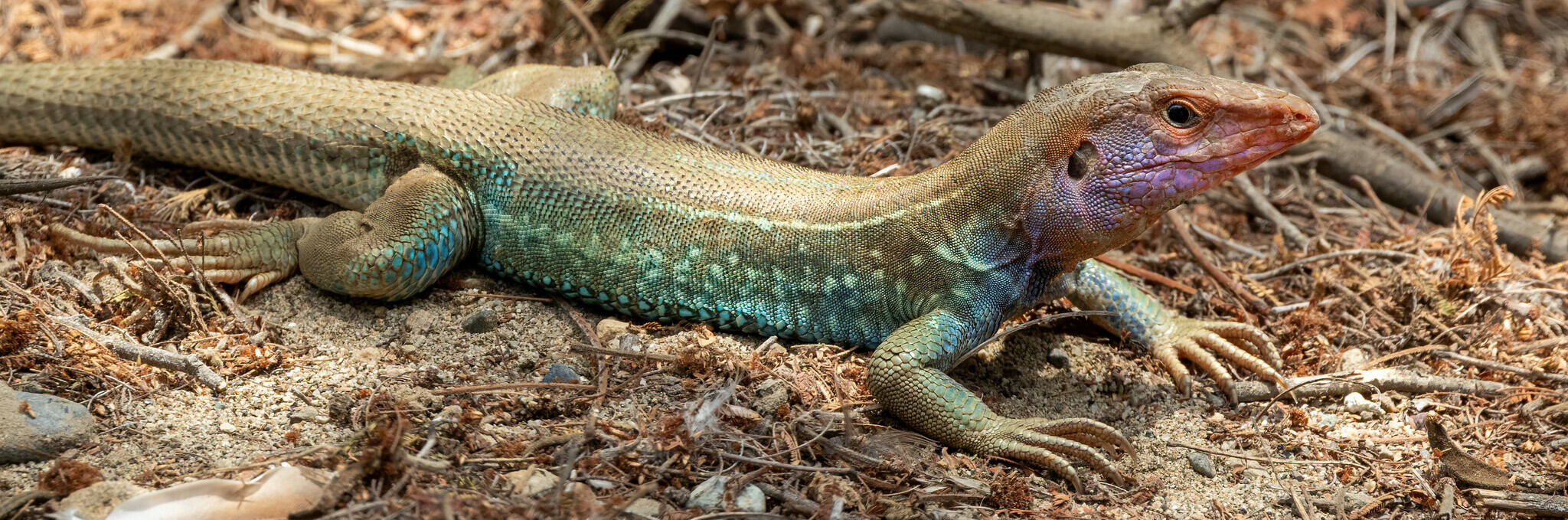
