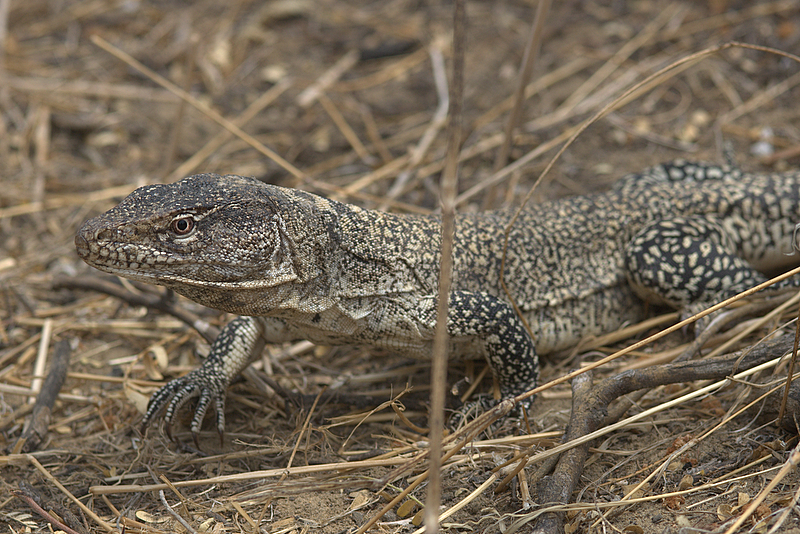
- False monitor (Callopistes flavipunctatus)

Scientific classification
- Kingdom: Animalia
- Phylum: Chordata
- Class: Reptilia
- Order: Squamata
- Family: Teiidae
- Subfamily: Callopistinae
- Genus: Callopistes; Gravenhorst, 1838

Species
- C. flavipunctatus (A.M.C. Duméril & Bibron), 1839; C. maculatus Gravenhorst, 1838; †C. bicuspidatus Deschamps & Tomassini, 2016; †C. rionegrensis Quadros et al., 2018

= Callopistes =

Callopistes Temporal range: Early Miocene–Recent

Genus of lizards

Callopistes is a genus of lizards in the family Teiidae. The genus contains two extant species, which are native to Ecuador, Peru, and Chile, as well as two fossil species found in Argentina.

== Species ==
Listed alphabetically.

Image	Scientific name	Common name	Distribution
	Callopistes flavipunctatus (A.M.C. Duméril & Bibron, 1839)	False monitor	Peru and Ecuador.
	Callopistes maculatus Gravenhorst, 1838	Spotted false monitor	Chile

Nota bene: A binomial authority in parentheses indicates that the species was originally described in a genus other than Callopistes.

=== Fossils ===
Image	Scientific name	Distribution
	†Callopistes bicuspidatus	Monte Hermoso Formation, Argentina
	†Callopistes rionegrensis	Chichinales Formation, Argentina
