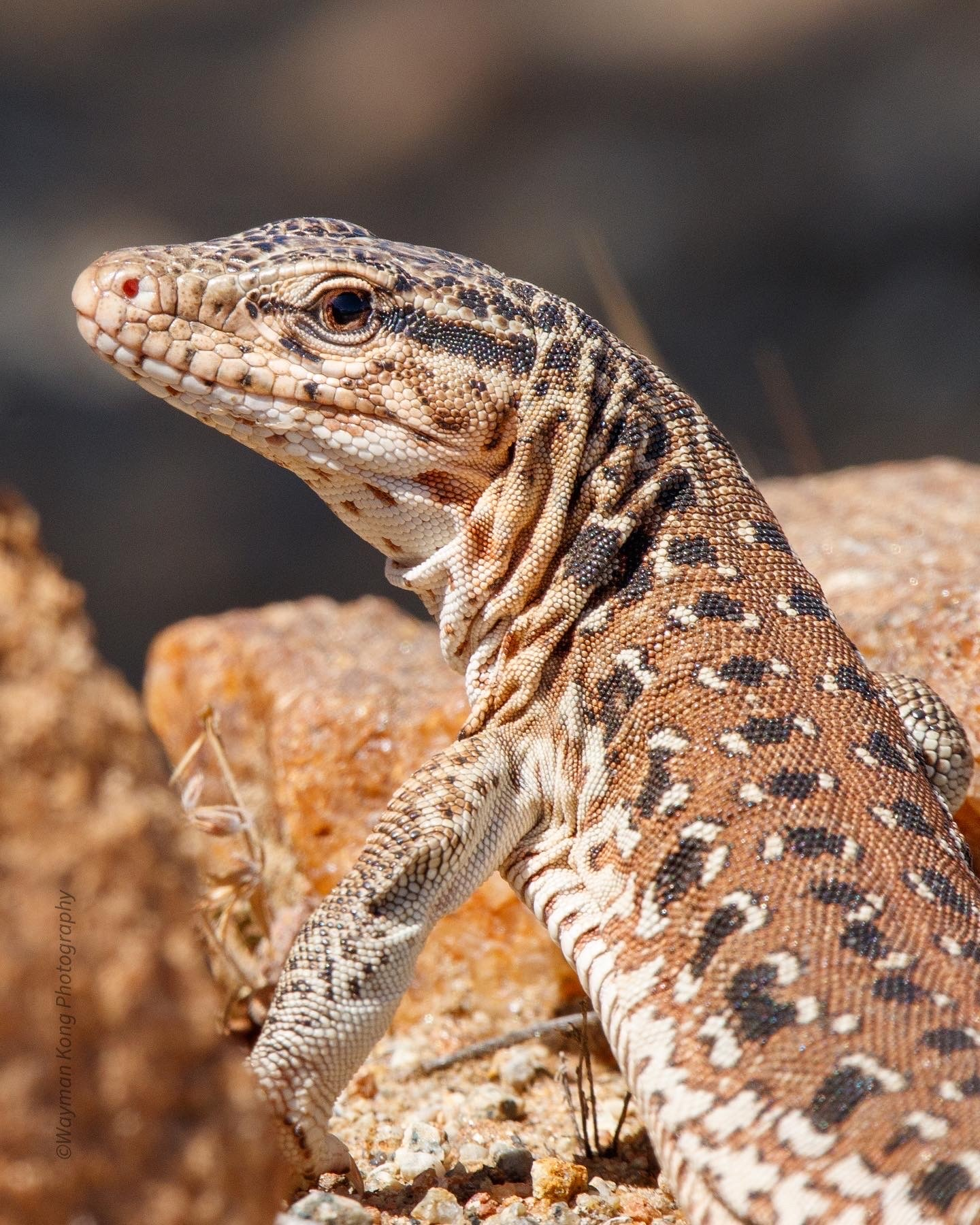

Conservation status
- Least Concern (IUCN 3.1)

Scientific classification
- Kingdom: Animalia
- Phylum: Chordata
- Class: Reptilia
- Order: Squamata
- Family: Teiidae
- Genus: Callopistes
- Species: C. maculatus

Binomial name
- Callopistes maculatus Gravenhorst, 1838

= Callopistes maculatus =

Species of lizard

Callopistes maculatus, also known as the dwarf tegu, Chilean dwarf tegu, spotted false monitor or Chilean iguana (in Spanish iguana Chilena), is a species of lizard in the family Teiidae. It is endemic to Chile.

== Description ==
It is the largest lizard of Chile, reaching a 50 centimetres (20 in) length.

== Diet ==
A diurnal species, it mainly preys upon insects. However, it also eats other, smaller lizards, snakes and small birds and mammals. At times, it may also eat substantial amounts of fruit.

== Ecology ==
The species frequents rocky, sandy scrubland environments in areas such as the Atacama Desert, at altitudes below 500m.

In 2015, this species was discovered hosting a new genus and species of parasitic mites, Callopistiella atacamensis. The genus was named after the host genus Callopistes.

== Gallery ==
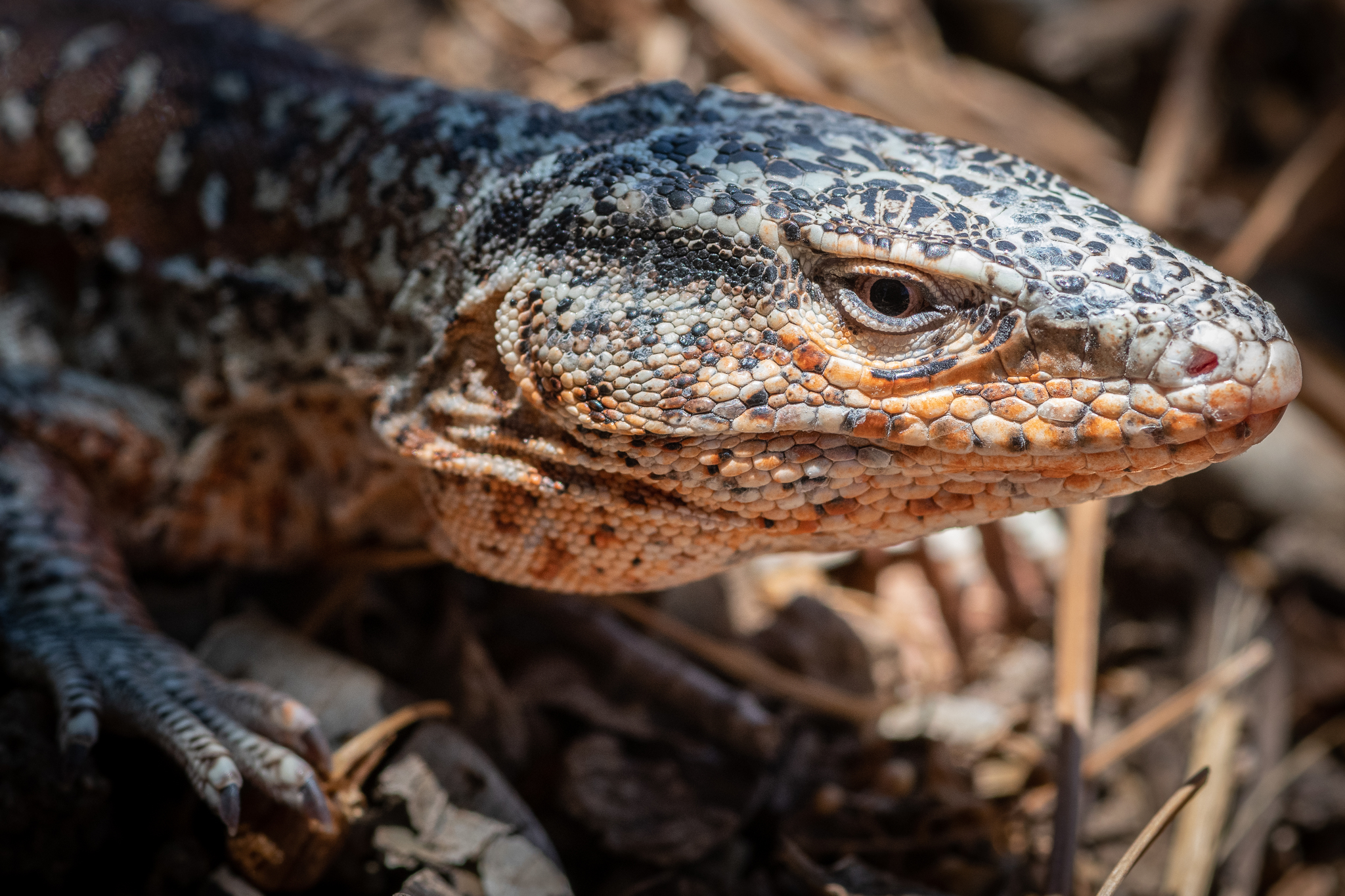

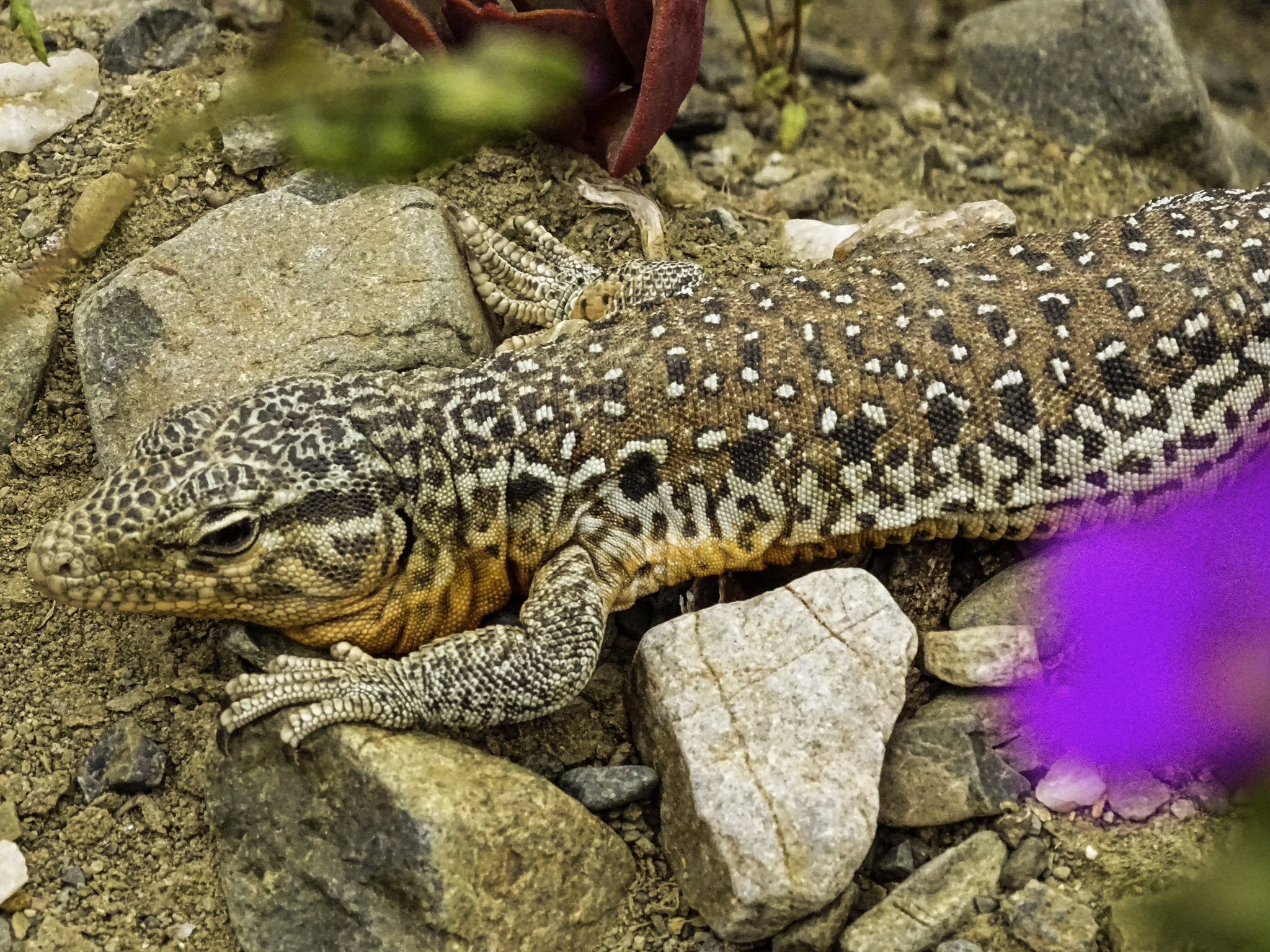

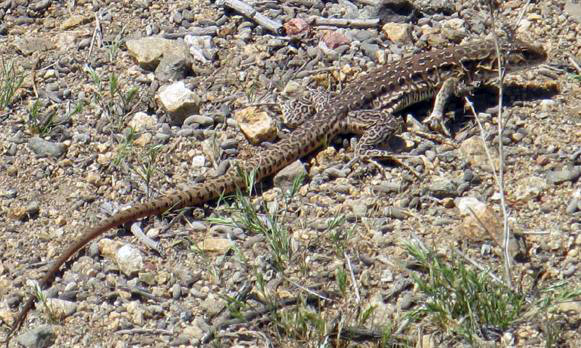
