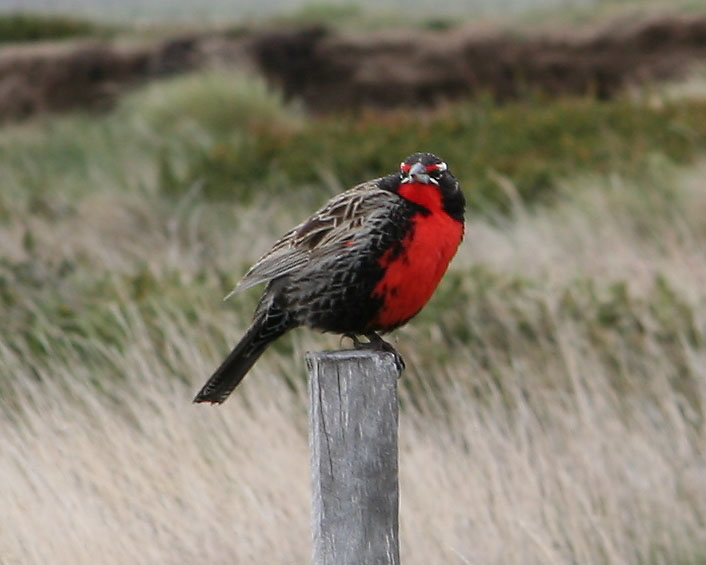
- Long-tailed meadowlark (Leistes loyca)

Scientific classification
- Kingdom: Animalia
- Phylum: Chordata
- Class: Aves
- Order: Passeriformes
- Family: Icteridae
- Genus: Leistes; Vigors, 1825

Type species
- Oriolus americanus Gmelin, 1788

Species
- S. militaris; S. superciliaris; S. bellicosus; S. defilippii; S. loyca

= Leistes =

Genus of birds

The genus Leistes are predominantly South American grassland birds called meadowlarks. The genus was previously lumped with the North American meadowlarks in the genus Sturnella.

It includes five species of largely insectivorous grassland birds. In all species the male at least has a black or brown back and extensively red underparts.

== List of species ==
There are five widely accepted members of the genus.

Genus Leistes – Vigors, 1825 – five species
Common name	Scientific name and subspecies	Range	Size and ecology	IUCN status and estimated population
Red-breasted meadowlark (formerly red-breasted blackbird) Male Female	Leistes militaris (Linnaeus, 1758)	south-western Costa Rica, and Trinidad, south to north-eastern Peru and central Brazil	Size: Habitat: Diet:	LC
White-browed meadowlark (formerly white-browed blackbird) Male Female	Leistes superciliaris (Bonaparte, 1850)	south-western Brazil through Paraguay, Uruguay and Argentina	Size: Habitat: Diet:	LC
Peruvian meadowlark	Leistes bellicosus (De Filippi, 1847)	western Peru, Ecuador and far northern Chile.	Size: Habitat: Diet:	LC
Pampas meadowlark Male Female	Leistes defilippii (Bonaparte, 1850)	Argentina, Brazil, and Uruguay.	Size: Habitat: Diet:	VU
Long-tailed meadowlark Male Female	Leistes loyca (Molina, 1782)	southern South America and the Falkland Islands	Size: Habitat: Diet:	LC

== Taxonomy ==
By the early 20th century, the meadowlarks were split. Only the "yellow-breasted" meadowlarks (eastern and western meadowlarks, including Lilian's) remained in the genus Sturnella. The red-breasted and white-browed meadowlarks were moved to the genus Leistes, while the pampas meadowlark, Peruvian meadowlark and long-tailed meadowlark made up the genus Pezites, which was established by Cabanis in 1851. By the late 20th century, all meadowlarks were lumped in the genus Sturnella. In 2017, all the red-breasted meadowlarks were merged into the genus Leistes.
