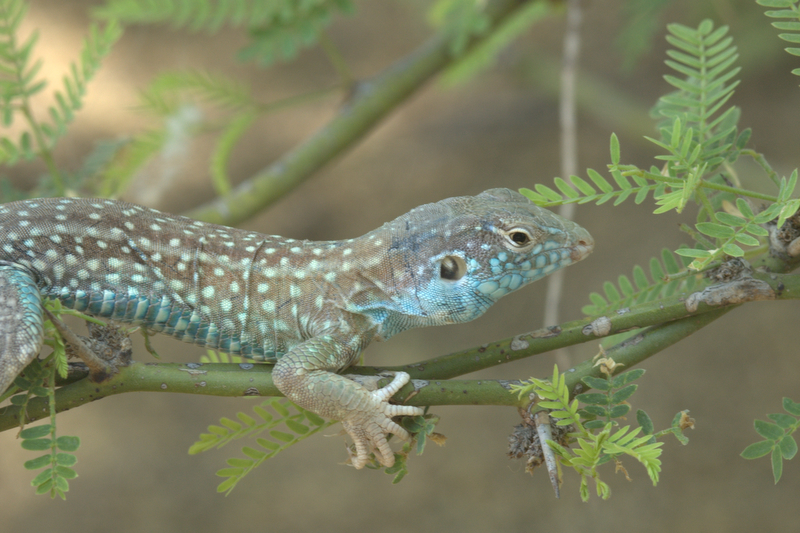

Conservation status
- Least Concern (IUCN 3.1)

Scientific classification
- Kingdom: Animalia
- Phylum: Chordata
- Class: Reptilia
- Order: Squamata
- Suborder: Lacertoidea
- Family: Teiidae
- Genus: Dicrodon
- Species: D. guttulatum

Binomial name
- Dicrodon guttulatum (A.M.C. Duméril & Bibron, 1839)

= Dicrodon guttulatum =

Species of lizard

Dicrodon guttulatum, the Peru desert tegu , is a species of teiid lizard found in Ecuador and Peru. It is herbivorous, with Prosopis pallida making up the majority of its diet.
