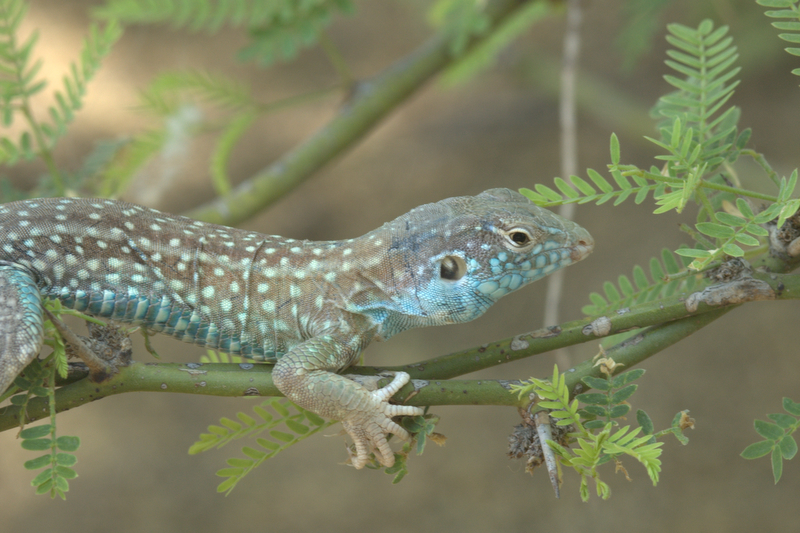
- Dicrodon guttulatum

Scientific classification
- Kingdom: Animalia
- Phylum: Chordata
- Class: Reptilia
- Order: Squamata
- Family: Teiidae
- Subfamily: Teiinae
- Genus: Dicrodon; A.M.C. Duméril & Bibron, 1839

Species
- 3 species, see text

= Dicrodon =

Genus of lizards

Dicrodon guttulatum in an illustration by P.J. Smit.

Dicrodon is a genus of lizards in the family Teiidae. Commonly known as desert tegus, there are three described species.

== Geographic range ==
Desert tegus are found in South America, specifically in Peru and Ecuador.

== Description ==
Desert tegus are the smallest species of tegu.

== Species ==
The following species, listed alphabetically by specific name, are recognized as being valid.

Image	Scientific name	Common name	Distribution
	Dicrodon guttulatum A.M.C. Duméril & Bibron, 1839	Peru desert tegu	Ecuador and Peru.
	Dicrodon heterolepis (Tschudi, 1845)	Ecuador desert tegu	Peru
	Dicrodon holmbergi K.P. Schmidt, 1957	Holmberg's desert tegu	Peru.

Nota bene: A binomial authority in parentheses indicates that the species was originally described in a genus other than Dicrodon.
