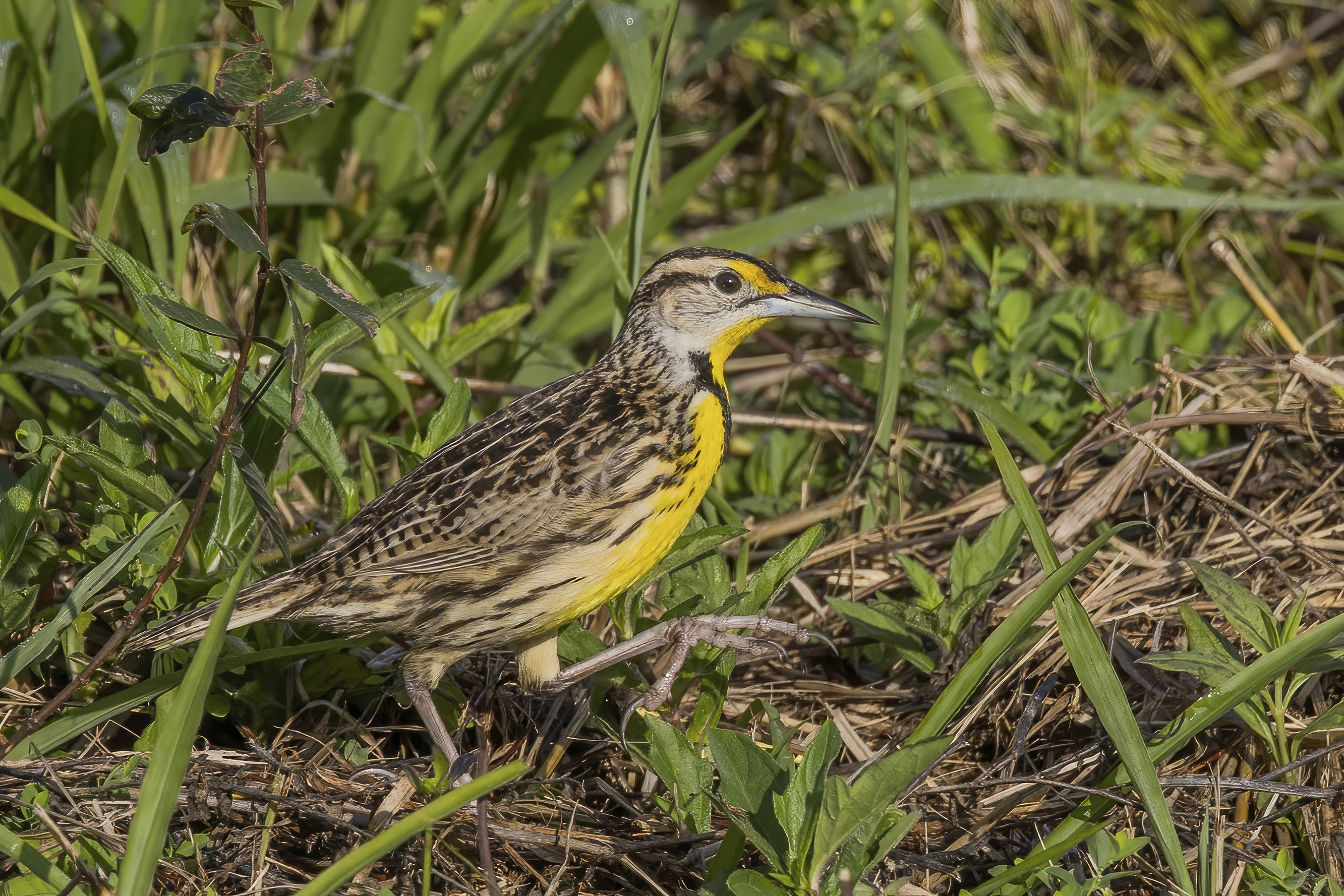
- Sturnella magna mexicana Belize

Conservation status
- Near Threatened (IUCN 3.1)

Scientific classification
- Kingdom: Animalia
- Phylum: Chordata
- Class: Aves
- Order: Passeriformes
- Family: Icteridae
- Genus: Sturnella
- Species: S. magna

Binomial name
- Sturnella magna (Linnaeus, 1758)
- S. magna range Breeding range Year-round range

Synonyms
- Alauda magna Linnaeus, 1758

Audio
- Song

= Eastern meadowlark =

Species of bird

The eastern meadowlark (Sturnella magna) is a medium-sized icterid bird, very similar in appearance to its sister species, the western meadowlark. It occurs from eastern North America to northern South America, where it is also most widespread in the east. The Chihuahuan meadowlark was formerly considered to be conspecific with the eastern meadowlark.

== Taxonomy ==
The eastern meadowlark was formally described by the Swedish naturalist Carl Linnaeus in 1758 in the tenth edition of his Systema Naturae. He placed it with the larks and pipits in the genus Alauda and adopted the binomial name Alauda magna. Linnaeus based his description on the "large lark" that had been described and illustrated in 1729–1732 by the English naturalist Mark Catesby. Catesby also used the Latin Alauda magna but as his book predates the introduction of the binomial system, he is not acknowledged as the authority. Catesby reported that "they inhabit Carolina, Virginia and most of the Northern continent of America." Confusingly, Linnaeus specified the habitat as "America, Africa". The type location was restricted to South Carolina by the American Ornithologist's Union in 1931. The eastern meadowlark is now placed with the western meadowlark and Chihuahuan meadowlark in the genus Sturnella that was introduced in 1816 by the French ornithologist Louis Pierre Vieillot. The name Sturnella is a diminutive of the Latin sturnus meaning "starling".

Fourteen subspecies are recognized:

- S. m. magna (Linnaeus, 1758) – southeast Canada and central, east USA
- S. m. argutula Bangs, 1899 – south-central, southeast USA
- S. m. hoopesi Stone, 1897 – south Texas (south-central USA) and northeast Mexico
- S. m. saundersi Dickerman & Phillips, AR, 1970 – southeast Oaxaca (south Mexico)
- S. m. alticola Nelson, 1900 – south Mexico to Costa Rica
- S. m. mexicana Sclater, PL, 1861 – southeast Mexico to Belize and Guatemala
- S. m. griscomi Van Tyne & Trautman, 1941 – north Yucatán (southeast Mexico)
- S. m. inexspectata Ridgway, 1888 – Honduras and northeast Nicaragua
- S. m. subulata Griscom, 1934 – Panama
- S. m. meridionalis Sclater, PL, 1861 – north-central Colombia to northwest Venezuela
- S. m. paralios Bangs, 1901 – north Colombia and north, central Venezuela
- S. m. praticola Chubb, C, 1921 – llanos of east Colombia and southeast Venezuela to Guyana and Suriname
- S. m. monticola Chubb, C, 1921 – montane south Venezuela, the Guianas and north Brazil
- S. m. hippocrepis (Wagler, 1832) – Cuba

The list of subspecies formerly included S. m. lilianae and S. m. auropectoralis. These are now considered to be a separate species, the Chihuahuan meadowlark. The split was based on a study published in 2021 that showed that there were significant morphological, vocal and genomic differences between these two taxa and the other subspecies of the eastern meadowlark.

== Description ==
The adult eastern meadowlark measures from 19 to 28 cm (7.5 to 11.0 in) in length and spans 35–40 cm (14–16 in) across the wings. Body mass ranges from 76 to 150 g (2.7 to 5.3 oz). The extended wing bone measures 8.9–12.9 cm (3.5–5.1 in), the tail measures 5.3–8.6 cm (2.1–3.4 in), the culmen measures 2.8–3.7 cm (1.1–1.5 in) and the tarsus measures 3.6–4.7 cm (1.4–1.9 in). Females are smaller in all physical dimensions. Adults have yellow underparts with a black "V" on the breast and white flanks with black streaks. The upperparts are mainly brown with black streaks. They have a long pointed bill; the head is striped with light brown and black.

The song of this bird is of pure, melancholy whistles, and thus simpler than the jumbled and flutey song of the western meadowlark; their ranges overlap across central North America. In the field, the song is often the easiest way to tell the two species apart, though plumage differences do exist, like tail pattern and malar coloration. In nonbreeding plumage, eastern meadowlarks tend to have more yellow-brown coloration in their flanks and more distinct striping on their heads.

The pale Chihuahuan meadowlark of northern Mexico and the southwestern US was recognized as a separate species by the American Ornithological Society in 2022.

== Distribution and habitat ==
Their breeding habitat is grasslands and prairie, also pastures and hay fields. This species is a permanent resident throughout much of its range, though most northern birds migrate southwards in winter. In 1993 this species was first recorded in El Salvador, and the discovery of a breeding pair in 2004 confirmed that the species is a resident there.

== Behavior and ecology ==
=== Breeding ===
Nesting occurs throughout the summer months. The nest is also on the ground, covered with a roof woven from grasses. There may be more than one nesting female in a male's territory. Nests are placed on the ground in depressions 1 to 3 inches deep, such as in the hoofprints of cattle, in pastures, meadows, hay fields, and on the edges of marshes. The nests are made of dried grass and plant stems, and are lined with grass lespedezas, pine needles, or horse hair.

Although the eastern meadowlark's range overlaps with that of the closely related western meadowlark, incidents of hybridization are thought to be rare. Both species avoid sharing territories with the other and will only interbreed when mates are scarce.

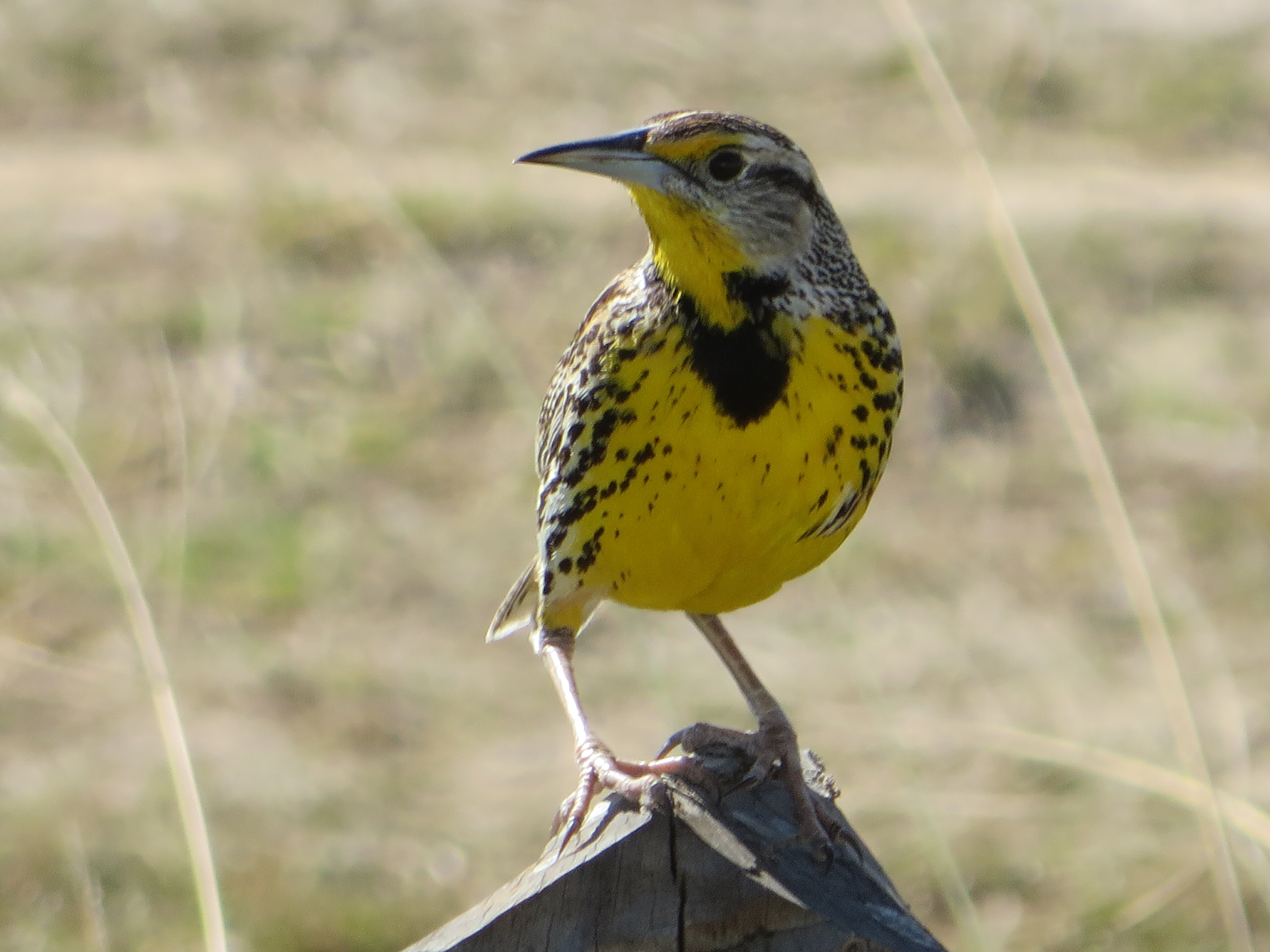
The Cuban subspecies S. m. hippocrepis (Wagler, 1832) is small and more streaked below compared to other populations

=== Food and feeding ===
These birds forage on the ground or in low vegetation, sometimes probing with the bill. They mainly eat arthropods, but also seeds and berries. In winter, they often feed in flocks. About three-quarters of the eastern meadowlark's diet is from animal sources like beetles, grasshoppers, and crickets. They also eat grain and seeds.

== Conservation status ==
The numbers of this species increased as forests were cleared in eastern North America. This species is ideally suited to farmland areas, especially where tall grasses are allowed to grow. Their numbers are now shrinking with a decline in suitable habitat. On the other hand, its range is expanding in parts of Central America toward the Pacific (western) side of the continent, in agricultural-type areas.

Eastern meadowlarks are species at risk in Nova Scotia and the subject of agricultural conservation program seeking to reduce mortality through modified practices. Allowing marginal areas of fields on farms to seed with grass can provide nesting habitat for meadowlarks and all grassland birds. Delaying hay harvest can also improve survival, giving young meadowlarks a chance of fledging

== Gallery ==
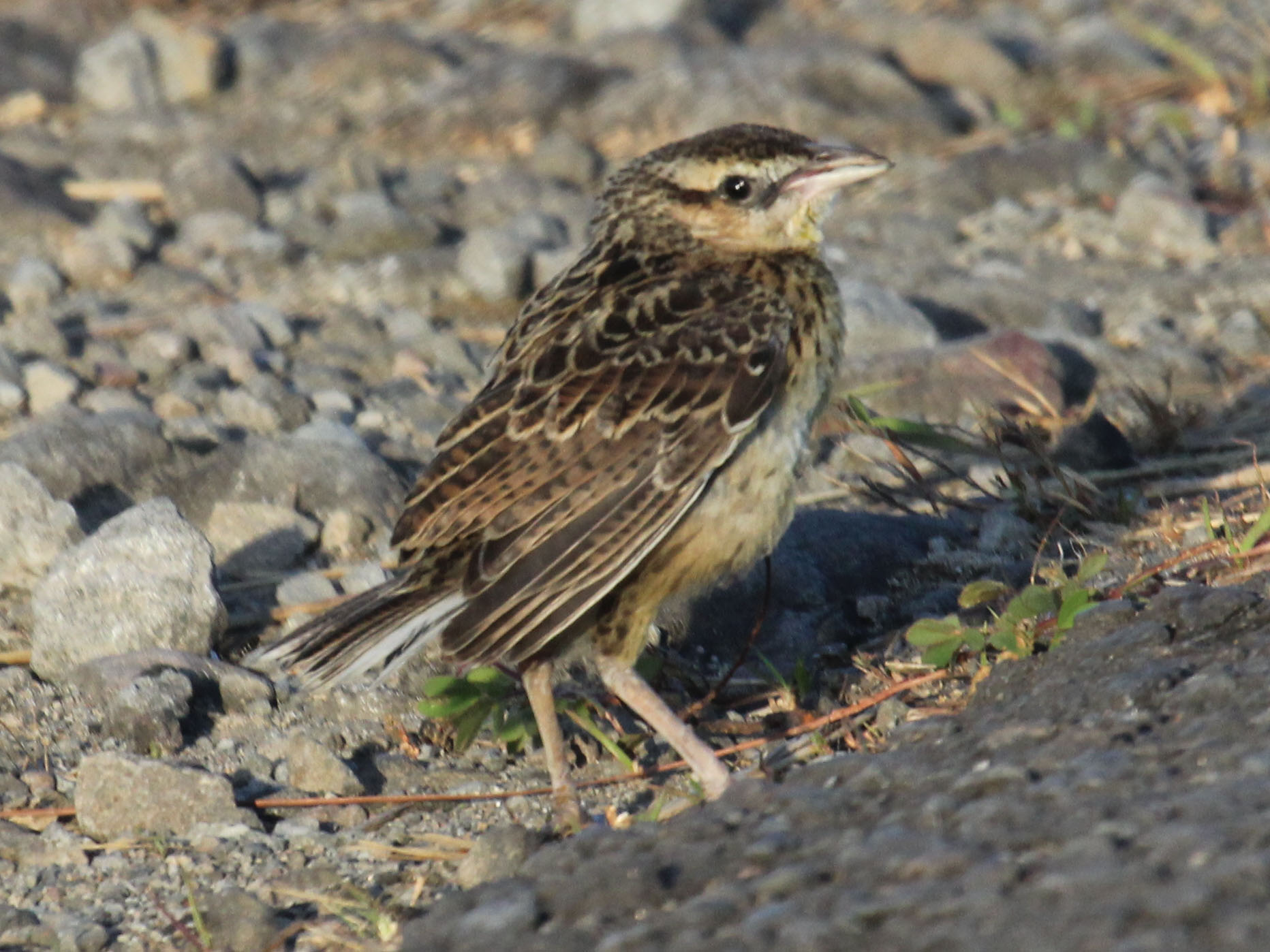
Juvenile – Panama

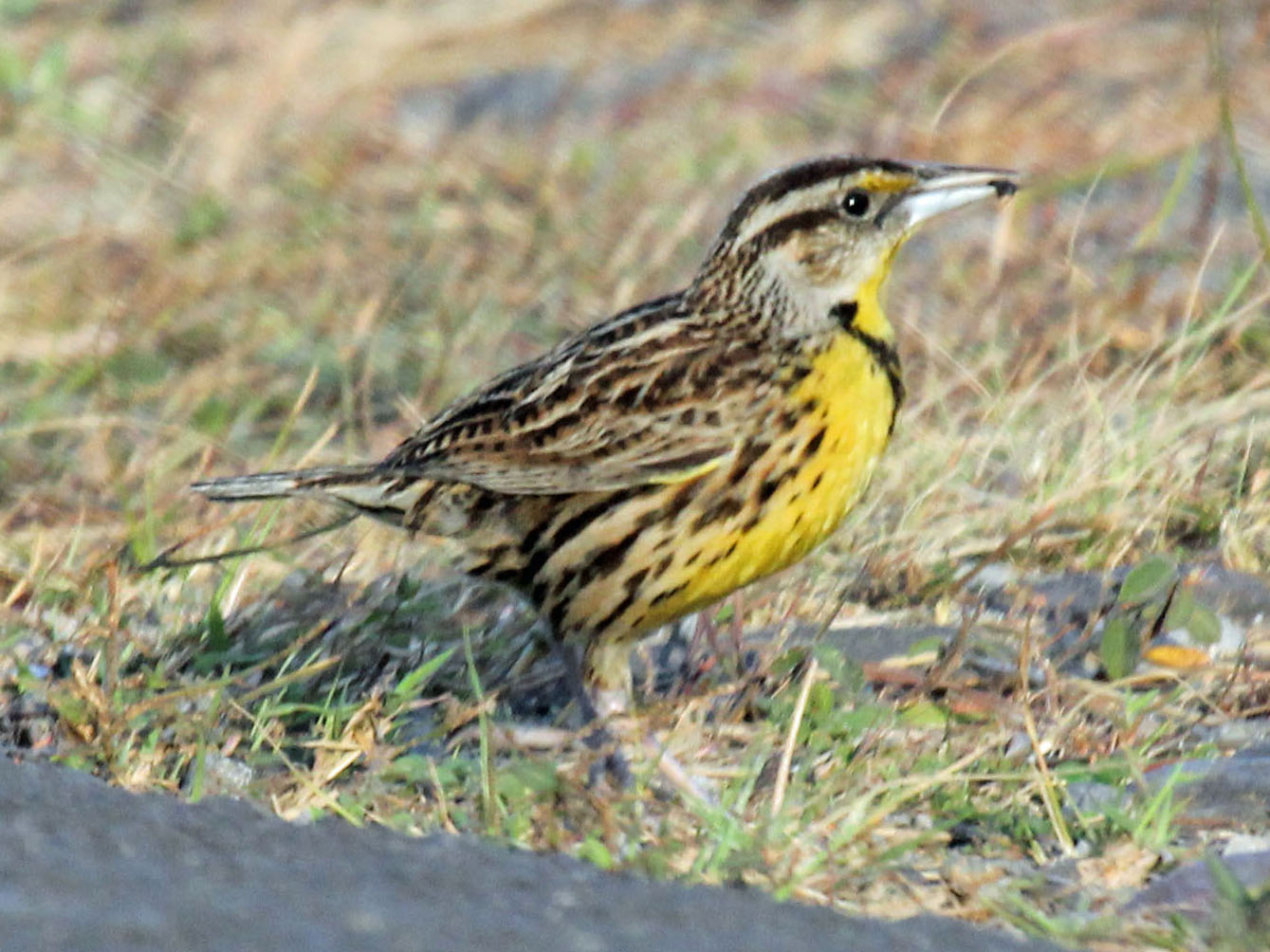
Adult – Panama

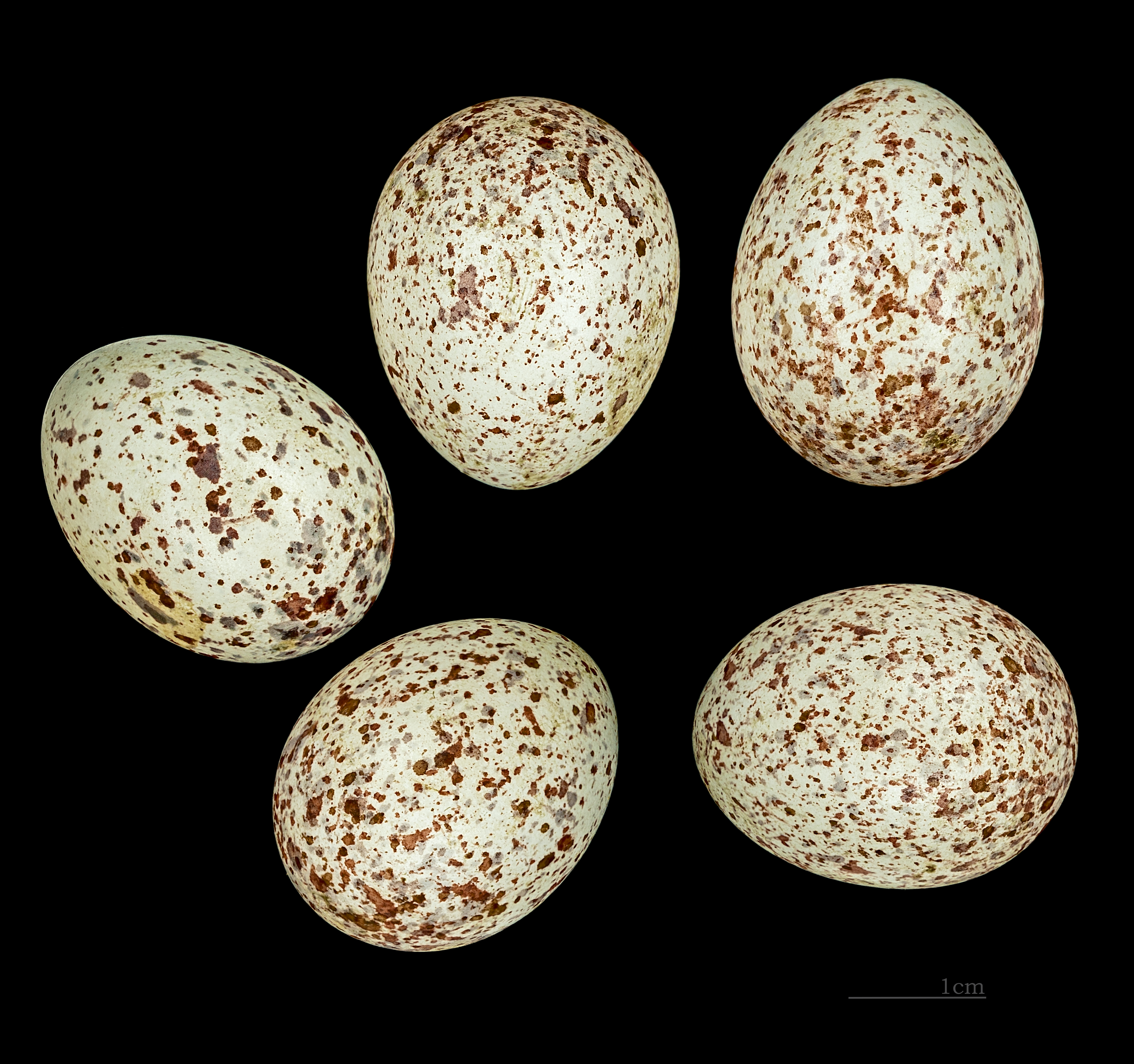
Eggs of Sturnella magna MHNT

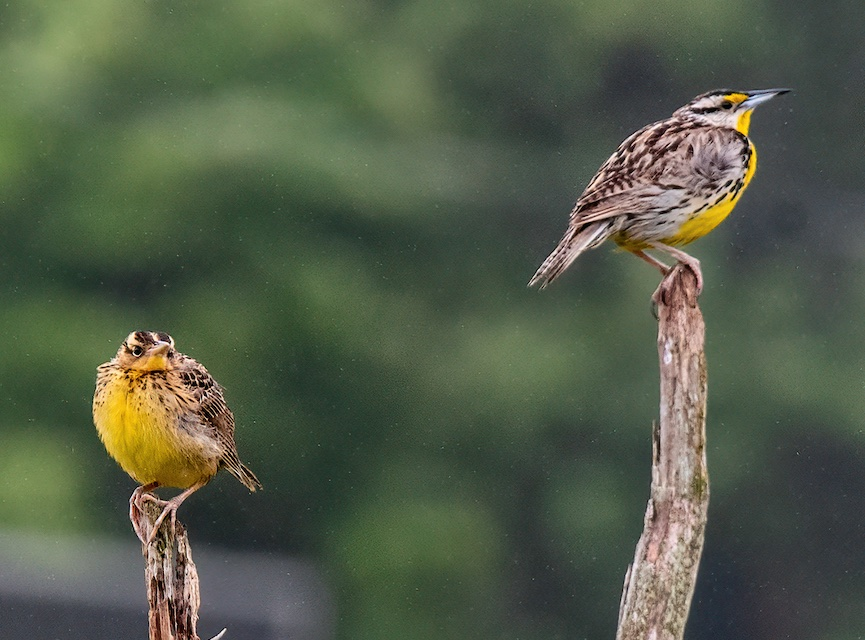
Juvenile and adult – Maine
