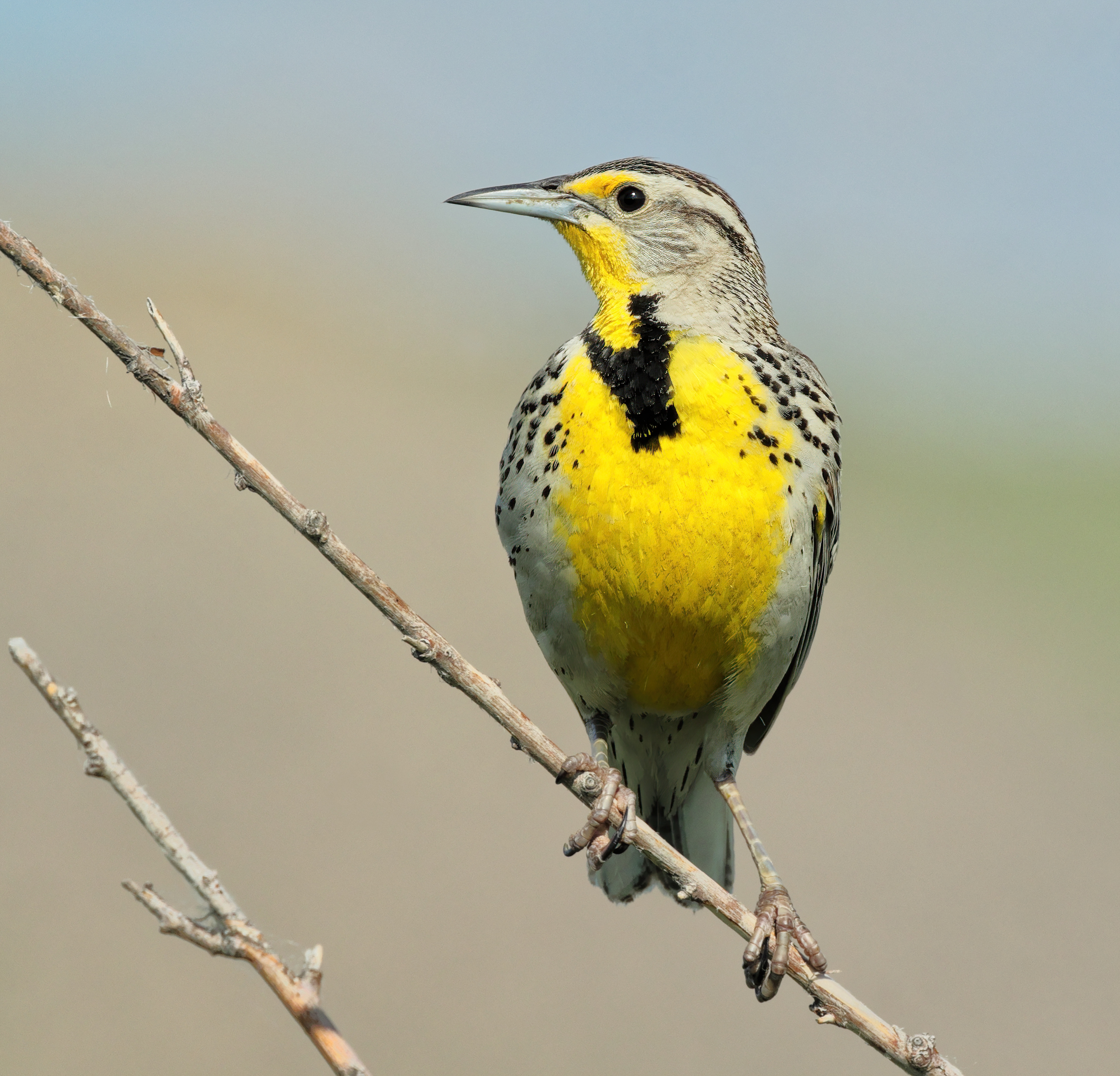

Conservation status
- Least Concern (IUCN 3.1)

Scientific classification
- Kingdom: Animalia
- Phylum: Chordata
- Class: Aves
- Order: Passeriformes
- Family: Icteridae
- Genus: Sturnella
- Species: S. neglecta

Binomial name
- Sturnella neglecta Audubon, 1844
- Range of S. neglecta Breeding range Year-round range Wintering range

Audio
- Song

= Western meadowlark =

Medium sized bird of North America with distinctive yellow chest

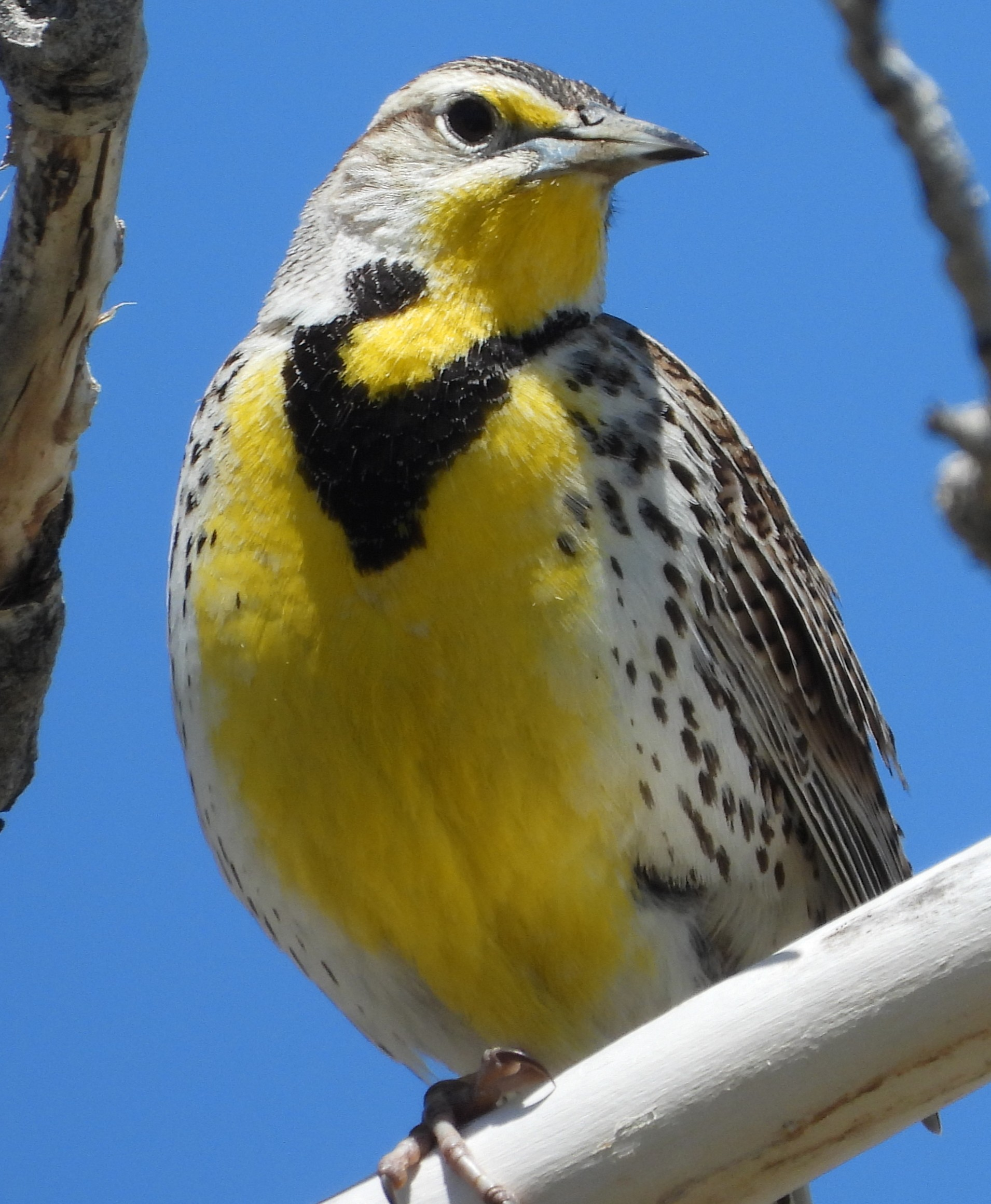
Seen in Kaycee, Wyoming

The western meadowlark (Sturnella neglecta) is a medium-sized icterid bird, about 20 cm (7.9 in) in length. It is found across western and central North America and is a partial migrant, breeding in western Canada and western United States west of the Great Lakes, and in northern Mexico. In the northern half of the breeding range, the birds migrate south for the winter, while further south they are resident all year. The winter range also extends south and southeast of the breeding range, as far as central Mexico, and east to western Florida. The western meadowlark nests on the ground in open grasslands and shrublands. It feeds on bugs and seeds. The western meadowlark has distinctive calls described as watery or flute-like, which distinguish it from the closely related eastern meadowlark. The western meadowlark is the state bird of six states; in Kansas, Montana, Nebraska, North Dakota, Oregon, and Wyoming.

== Taxonomy ==
The western meadowlark was formally described in 1844 by the American ornithologist John James Audubon under its current binomial name Sturnella neglecta. The specific epithet is from the Latin neglectus meaning "ignored", "overlooked", "neglected" or "disregarded". Audubon explained that although the account of the Lewis and Clark Expedition of 1803–1806 mentioned yellow larks, these had never been formally described. The type locality is Old Fort Union, North Dakota.

Despite having "lark" in their name due to their melodic song, they are not true larks, but are instead in the New World blackbird family.

Two subspecies are recognized:

- S. n. neglecta Audubon, 1844 – southwest, south central Canada through the west US (except coastal Pacific Northwest) to central Mexico
- S. n. confluenta Rathbun, 1917 – coastal southwest Canada and northwest US (southwest British Columbia to Oregon)

Western meadowlarks will occasionally hybridize with eastern meadowlarks where their ranges overlap. However, both species typically avoid sharing territories with the other and will only interbreed when mates are scarce. Offspring which result from these pairings appear to have low fertility.

== Description ==
Western meadowlark adults have yellow underparts with a black "V" on the breast and white flanks streaked with black. Their upper parts are mostly brown, but also have black streaks. These birds have long, pointed bills and their heads are striped with light brown and black bands.

Measurements:

- Length: 16–26 cm (6.3–10.2 in)
- Wingspan: 41 cm (16 in)
- Weight: 89–115 g (3.1–4.1 oz)

These birds have a flute-like warbled song. These calls contrast with the simple, whistled call of the eastern meadowlark.

== Distribution and habitat ==
The breeding habitat includes grasslands, prairies, pastures, and abandoned fields, all of which may be found across western and central North America, as far south as northern Mexico. In regions where their range overlaps with the eastern species, this species prefers thinner, drier vegetation; the two species generally do not interbreed but do defend territory against one another. Their nests are situated on the ground and are covered with a roof woven from grass. There may be more than one nesting female in a male's territory. Nests are sometimes destroyed by mowing operations with eggs and young in them.

Western meadowlarks are permanent residents throughout much of their range. Northern birds may migrate to the southern parts of their range; some birds also move east in the southern United States.

It has also been introduced to Hawaii to control insects, and is now found on the island of Kauai. Attempted introductions to other islands failed, likely due to the presence of the small Indian mongoose, which is absent from Kauai.

== Behavior and ecology ==
=== Breeding ===
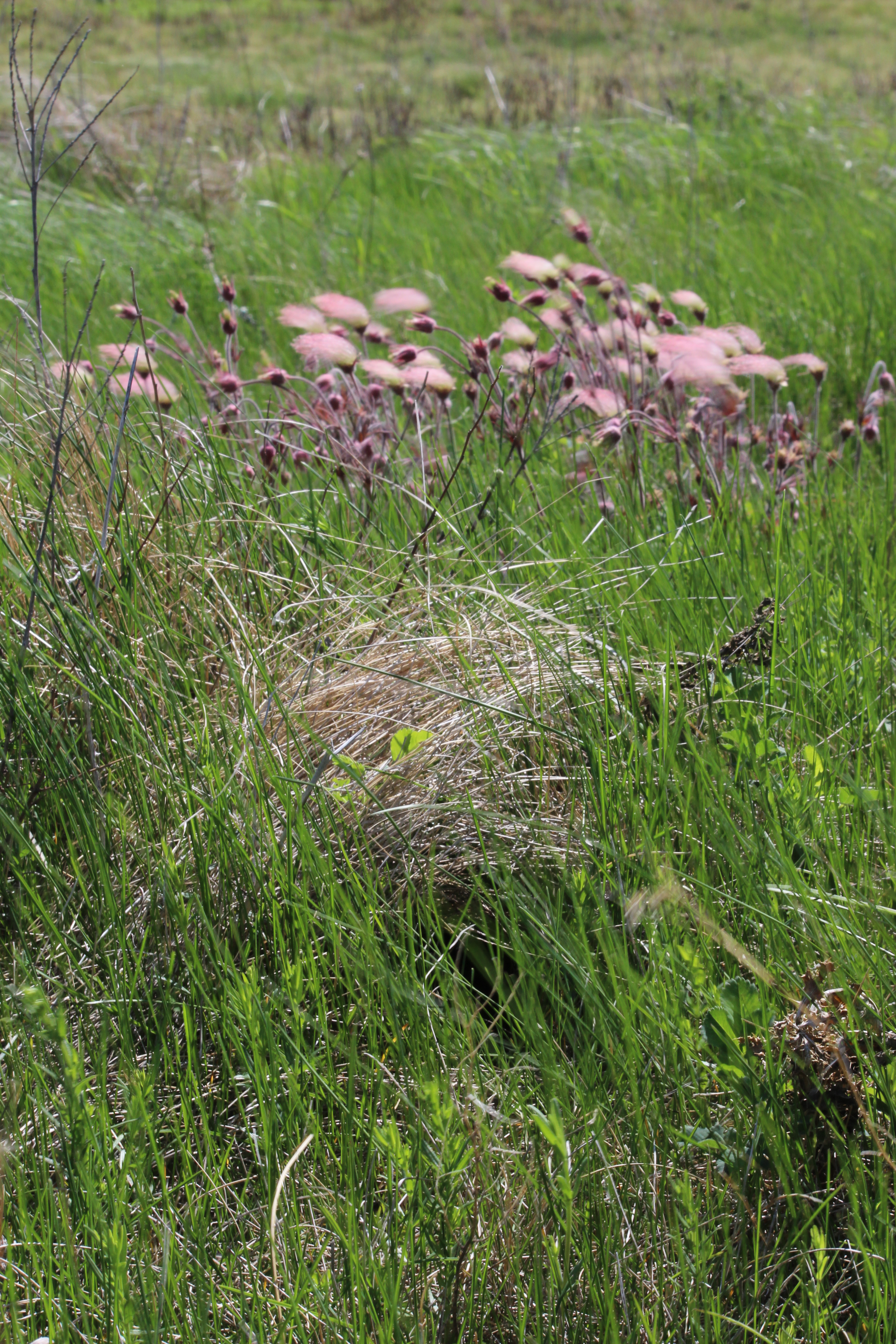
Well-hidden nest

The nest is built by the female soon after arrival on the breeding grounds. The nest is placed in a concealed location on the ground. It is variable in form and ranges from a simple cup to a partially roofed structure with a runway extending from the nest entrance. Eggs are laid at daily intervals. Incubation only begins after the last egg is laid. The eggs measure on average 28 mm × 21 mm (1.10 in × 0.83 in) and have brownish spots and blotches on a white ground. The eggs hatch over a period of one or two days after being incubated by the female for 13–15 days. The young are altricial and nearly naked; their eyes are closed until the 4th day. Only the female broods the chicks. The nestlings are almost exclusively fed insects. The male brings food to the nest which is then usually fed to the chicks by the female. The young fledge at 10–12 days but are only capable of sustained flight at around 21 days. The young receive parental care for around 2 weeks after fledging. A second brood is attempted.

The nests are parasitized by brown-headed cowbirds (Molothrus ater).

=== Food and feeding ===
Western meadowlarks forage on the ground or in low to semi-low vegetation. They sometimes search for food by probing with their bills. They mainly eat insects, although they will consume seeds and berries. In winter, these birds often feed in flocks.

== Relationship to humans ==
The western meadowlark is the state bird of six states, Kansas, Montana, Nebraska, North Dakota, Oregon, and Wyoming. The northern cardinal, which represents seven states, is the only bird to hold the status of state bird in more states.

During the 2017 regular session of the Oregon Legislature, there was a short-lived controversy over the western meadowlark's status as state bird versus the osprey. The sometimes-spirited debate included state representative Rich Vial playing the meadowlark's song on his smartphone over the House microphone. A compromise was reached in SCR 18, which was passed on the last day of the session, designating the western meadowlark as the state songbird and the osprey as the state raptor.
