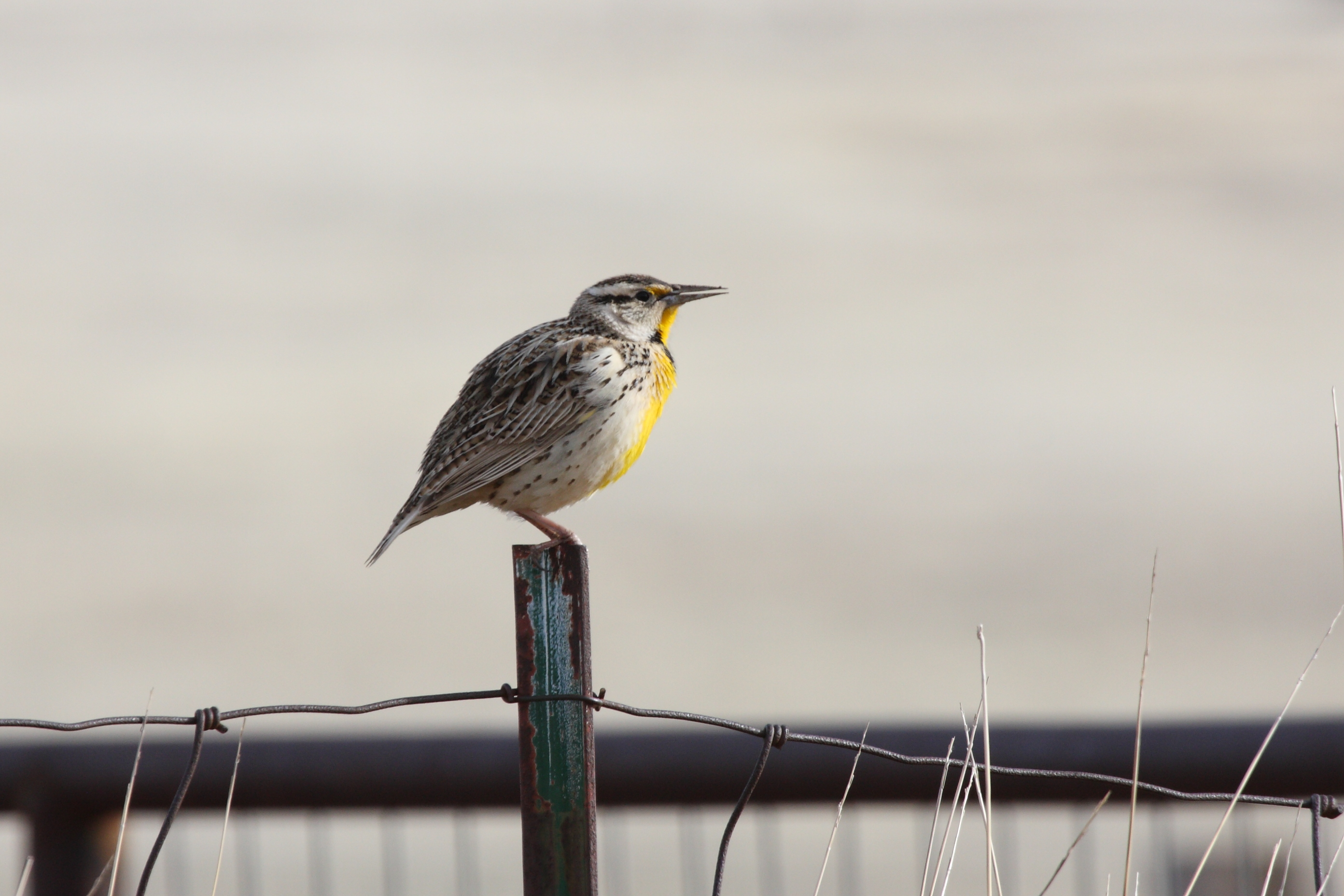

Scientific classification
- Kingdom: Animalia
- Phylum: Chordata
- Class: Aves
- Order: Passeriformes
- Family: Icteridae
- Genus: Sturnella
- Species: S. lilianae

Binomial name
- Sturnella lilianae Oberholser, 1930

= Chihuahuan meadowlark =

Subspecies of bird

The Chihuahuan meadowlark (Sturnella lilianae), also known as Lilian's meadowlark, is a bird in the family Icteridae, the oropendolas, New World orioles, and New World blackbirds. It is found in Mexico and the United States.

== Taxonomy and systematics ==
The Chihuahuan meadowlark was formally described in 1930 by the American ornithologist Harry C. Oberholser as a subspecies of the eastern meadowlark based on a holotype that had been collected in the Huachuca Mountains of Arizona. Oberholser proposed the trinomial Sturnella magna lilianae. The subspecific epithet lilianae was chosen to honor Lilian Hanna Baldwin (wife of ornithologist Samuel Prentiss Baldwin), as she had presented the Cleveland Museum of Natural History the collection of birds that included the type specimen of the new subspecies.

The Chihuahuan meadowlark's further taxonomy is unsettled. A 2021 publication detailed morphological, vocal, and genomic differences between the Chihuahuan meadowlark and the other subspecies of the eastern meadowlark. Based largely on it, in 2022 the American Ornithological Society, the Clements taxonomy, and the IOC recognized two of the subspecies of the eastern meadowlark as the Chichuahuan meadowlark. Those two are the nominate S. l. lilianae (Oberholser, 1930) and S. l. auropectoralis (Saunders, GB, 1934). The initial version of AviList in 2025 also adopted the split. However, as of late 2025 BirdLife International's Handbook of the Birds of the World (HBW) had not recognized the split.

This article follows the IOC et al. model.

== Description ==
The Chihuahuan meadowlark is about 25 cm (9.8 in) long. It weighs 77 to 130 g (2.7 to 4.6 oz); males are larger than females. The sexes have the same plumage. Adults of the nominate subspecies have a dark brown crown with a paler stripe through its middle. They have a supercilium that is dark yellow from the bill to the eye and whitish beyond it and a dark line from the eye to the nape on an otherwise whitish face. Their upperparts are brown with blackish barring and with white edges on the back and scapular feathers. The two innermost pairs of tail feathers are brown with blackish barring like the upperparts. The other four pairs are mostly white with some dark edges on the innermost of them. Their wing coverts and flight feathers have a complex pattern of brown, cinnamon-brown, and blackish. Their chin, throat, and the center of their underparts are rich yellow with a black "V" on the breast. Their sides, flanks, and undertail coverts are whitish with thin dark brown streaks. They have a brown iris, a black or dusky maxilla, a bluish gray mandible with a dusky tip, and dusky pinkish legs and feet. Juveniles resemble adults with an overall buffy wash, less distinct barring, and paler yellow underparts. They lack the black "V" and have brownish mottling instead. They have a pinkish buff bill, legs, and feet. Adults of subspecies S. l. auropectoralis have an orange wash on the breast but are otherwise like the nominate.

== Distribution and habitat ==
The Chihuahuan meadowlark has a disjunct distribution. The nominate subspecies is the more northerly of the two. It is found from northern Arizona, northern New Mexico, and western Texas in the U. S. south into Mexico's northern Sonora and Chihuahua states. It occasionally is found further west in Arizona and further east in Texas. There are also breeding records in Colorado and tentative sightings north and east of its range. Subspecies S. l. auropectoralis is found in west-central Mexico from southern Sinaloa and Durango south to Nayarit and east to Michoacán and México.

The nominate subspecies of the Chihuahuan meadowlark inhabits desert grasslands. Subspecies S. l. auropectoralis is also in desert grasslands but in the eastern part of its range is more often found in irrigated farmland.

== Behavior ==
=== Movement ===
The Chihuahuan meadowlark is mostly a year-round resident. However, many individuals of the nominate subspecies apparently withdraw from northern Arizona, northern New Mexico, and northwestern Texas into the year-round range after the breeding season.

=== Feeding ===
The Chihuahuan meadowlark's diet has not been studied separately from that of it former "parent" eastern meadowlark. That species feeds on insects and seeds by picking and probing the ground.

=== Breeding ===
The Chihuahuan meadowlark's breeding season has not been fully defined. It includes July and August in Arizona and may start as early as January in Sonora. It nests on the ground, building a domed cup of grass with a side entrance, sometimes first scraping a shallow depression for it. The nest is hidden in tall grass or under vegetation. Based on data from other meadowlark species, the female alone is believed to build it. Clutches in New Mexico were of four to six eggs. The incubation period, time to fledging, and details of parental care are not known. In other meadowlarks incubation takes 13 to 16 days; young leave the nest 10 to 12 days after hatch but cannot fly for about two more weeks. In other meadowlarks females incubate the clutch and brood nestlings; both parents provision nestlings.

=== Vocalization ===
The male Chihuahuan meadowlark's primary song is "3-5 descending whistles, sometimes started with a short low frequency (2-3 kHz) note". Both sexes give a "single, explosive" dzert call; when excited they chatter.

== Status ==
The IUCN follows HBW taxonomy and so has not assessed the Chihuahuan meadowlark separately from the eastern meadowlark sensu lato. "The species is declining in New Mexico and the Chihuahuan Desert. Threats to this species include land development, invasive species, agriculture, and climate change."
