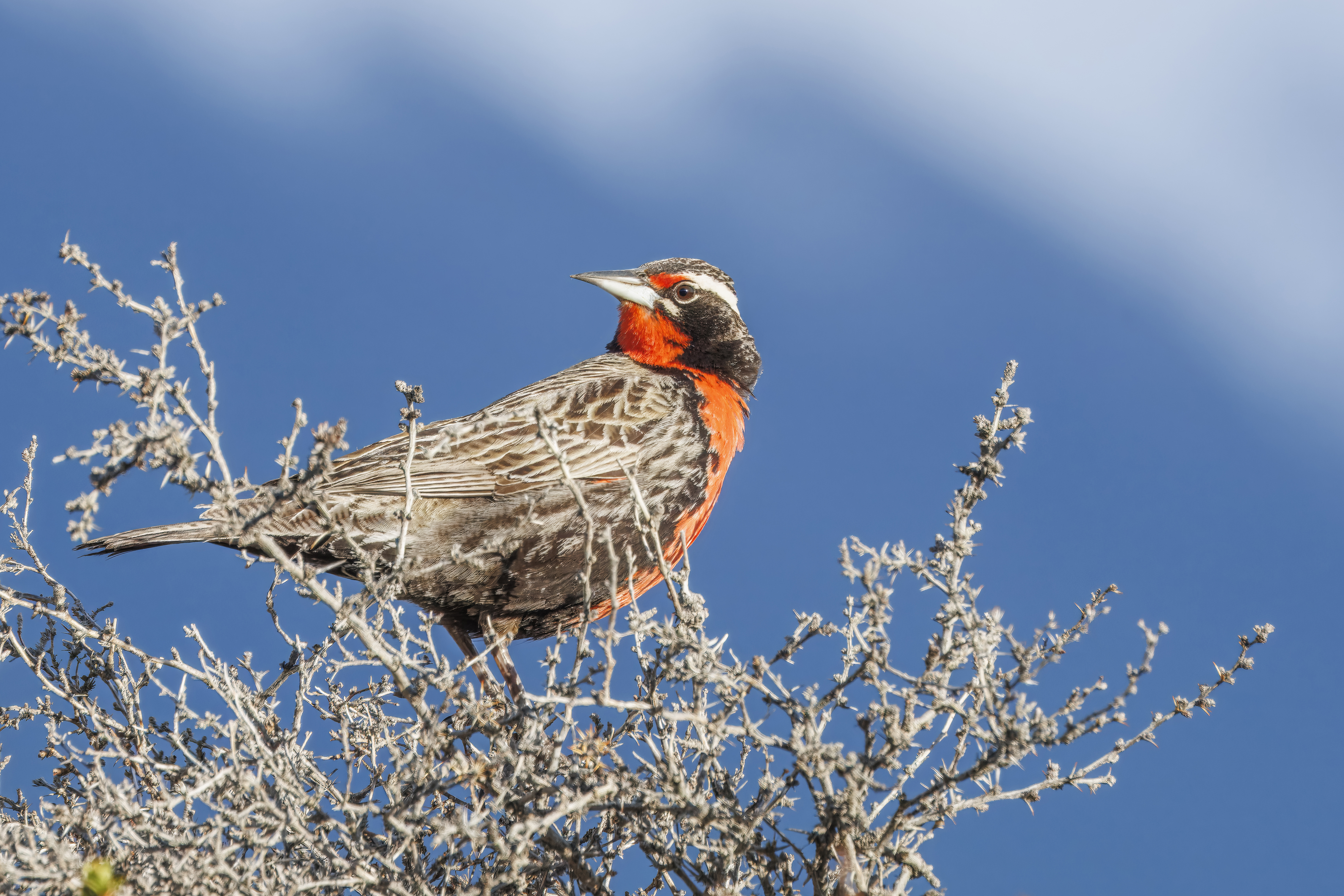
- Male, Chile
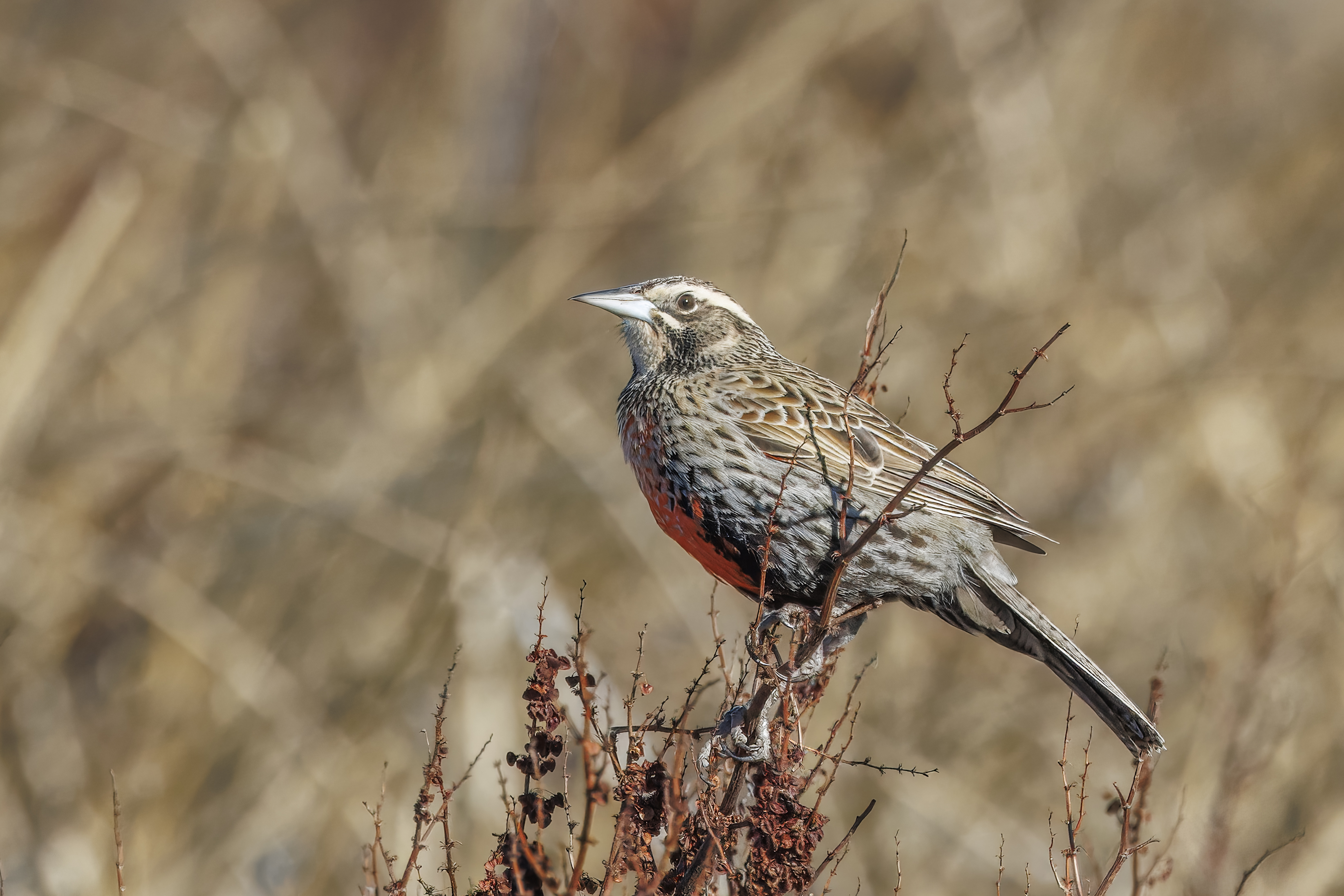
- Female, Argentina

Conservation status
- Least Concern (IUCN 3.1)

Scientific classification
- Kingdom: Animalia
- Phylum: Chordata
- Class: Aves
- Order: Passeriformes
- Family: Icteridae
- Genus: Leistes
- Species: L. loyca

Binomial name
- Leistes loyca (Molina, 1782)

Synonyms
- see text

= Long-tailed meadowlark =

Species of bird

The long-tailed meadowlark (Leistes loyca) is a passerine bird in the family Icteridae, the oropendolas, New World orioles, and New World blackbirds. It is found in Argentina, Chile, and the Falkland Islands.

== Taxonomy and systematics ==
The long-tailed meadowlark has a complicated taxonomic history. It was formally described in 1782 with the binomial Sturnus Loyca [sic]. In the 1800s it was assigned to genus Sturnella, and for a time it and two other species were separated in genus Pezites. This genus was later again merged into Sturnella. In 2016 BirdLife International's Handbook of the Birds of the World assigned it to its current genus Leistes that had been erected in 1825. By 2019 the IOC, the Clements taxonomy, and the South American Classification Committee had also made the reassignment.

The long-tailed meadowlark has these four subspecies:

- L. l. loyca (Molina, 1782)
- L. l. catamarcanus (Zotta, 1937)
- L. l. obscurus (Nores & Yzurieta, 1979)
- L. l. falklandicus (Leverkühn, 1889)

== Description ==
Long-tailed meadowlark males average 27 cm (11 in) long. Males weigh an average of 112 g (4.0 oz) and females 97 g (3.4 oz). Adult males of the nominate subspecies L. l. loyca have a mostly blackish head with a long supercilium that is red from the bill to the eye and white beyond it, a white lower eyelid, and a short white "moustache". Their upperparts, wings, and tail are mostly brown with blackish streaks. A few wing coverts are rosy red and the underwing coverts are pale grayish white. Their chin, throat, and breast are rosy red with blackish sides. Their belly is black and their flanks and undertail coverts are striped with buffish and black. Adult females have an all-white supercilium. Their upperparts are paler than the male's. Their throat is white, their central belly is pale red, and the rest of their underparts are heavily streaked like their back. Juveniles resemble adult females with little or red on the belly.

Males of subspecies L. l. catamarcanus are paler than the nominate. L. l. obscurus males are darker and the red of their underparts does not extend to the lower belly. L. l. falklandicus has a longer bill with a wider tip than the nominate and its outermost tail feathers have some white. Both sexes of all subspecies have a dark brown iris, a bluish ivory bill with a blackish brown tip, and gray-brown legs and feet.

== Distribution and habitat ==
The long-tailed meadowlark has a disjunct distribution. The nominate subspecies has the largest range. It is found in Chile from the southern part of the Atacama Region south to Cape Horn and in Argentina from a line roughly from San Juan Province to the Atlantic in Buenos Aires Province south to Tierra del Fuego. Subspecies L. l. catamarcanus is found between northwestern Argentina's Jujuy and Catamarca provinces. L. l. obscurus is found in north-central Argentina's Córdoba and San Luis provinces. L. l. falklandicus is found in the Falkland Islands (Islas Malvinas) but has reached South Georgia as a vagrant. The island subspecies is locally known as the "military starling".

The long-tailed meadowlark's habitat varies geographically, though most landscapes are generally moderately moist to dry grassland and steppe. In the dry Andes it typically is found near marshes or watercourses and in irrigated fields. L. l. obscurus inhabits a more humid area of rocky grasslands and shrub-steppe. At the northern end of its Atlantic coastal range the species inhabits bunchgrass among the dunes. In the southern reaches of its range in Patagonia it inhabits moist to humid shrub-steppe and occurs at the edges and in clearings of Nothofagus forest. In the Falklands it favors fields of whitegrass (Cortaderia pilosa) and also is found in settlements. In elevation the nominate subspecies is found from sea level to 2,800 m (9,200 ft). Subspecies L. l. catamarcanus mostly ranges between 1,200 and 3,100 m (3,900 and 10,200 ft) but locally reaches 3,500 m (11,500 ft). L. l. obscurus breeds above 1,100 m (3,600 ft).

== Behavior ==
=== Movement ===
The long-tailed meadowlark is a year-round resident in most of its range. Some individuals move north after the breeding season.

=== Feeding ===
The long-tailed meadowlark feeds mostly on insects; other arthropods and fruits are a minor part of its diet. It has been observed feeding on maize (Zea mays) in Argentina. It has been reported feeding on growing potatoes in the Falklands. It feeds mostly on the ground, where it turns over debris and other items to expose prey, and in low vegetation. It commonly is seen perched on fenceposts, on rocks, and on shrubs and in trees. It typically forages in flocks that in the non-breeding season may reach 100 individuals.

=== Breeding ===
The long-tailed meadowlark breeds between September and January on the South American mainland; it may begin in August in the Falklands. It is apparently monogamous. Females build the nest, a cup with sometimes a dome roof, mostly using grass stems. Most nests are on the ground in a depression in the soil and are very well hidden under and among vegetation. In the Falklands some nests are in tussock grass clumps as much as 1 m (3 ft) above the ground. The clutch is three to four eggs that are buff to gray and heavily covered with darker spots and blotches. The female alone incubates and both parents provision nestlings. The incubation period, time to fledging, and other details of parental care are not known. At least in Argentina the shiny cowbird (Molothrus bonariensis) is a brood parasite.

=== Vocalization ===
Both sexes of the long-tailed meadowlark sing, usually from a perch. One description of the song is a descending "chup chup chup tchew ee chew chewee chweeeew". The species' calls are "peet and chuck".

== Status ==
The IUCN has assessed the long-tailed meadowlark as being of Least Concern. It has a very large range; its population size is unknown but is believed to be stable. No immediate threats have been identified. It is "common and reasonably widespread; more local in drier Andes".
