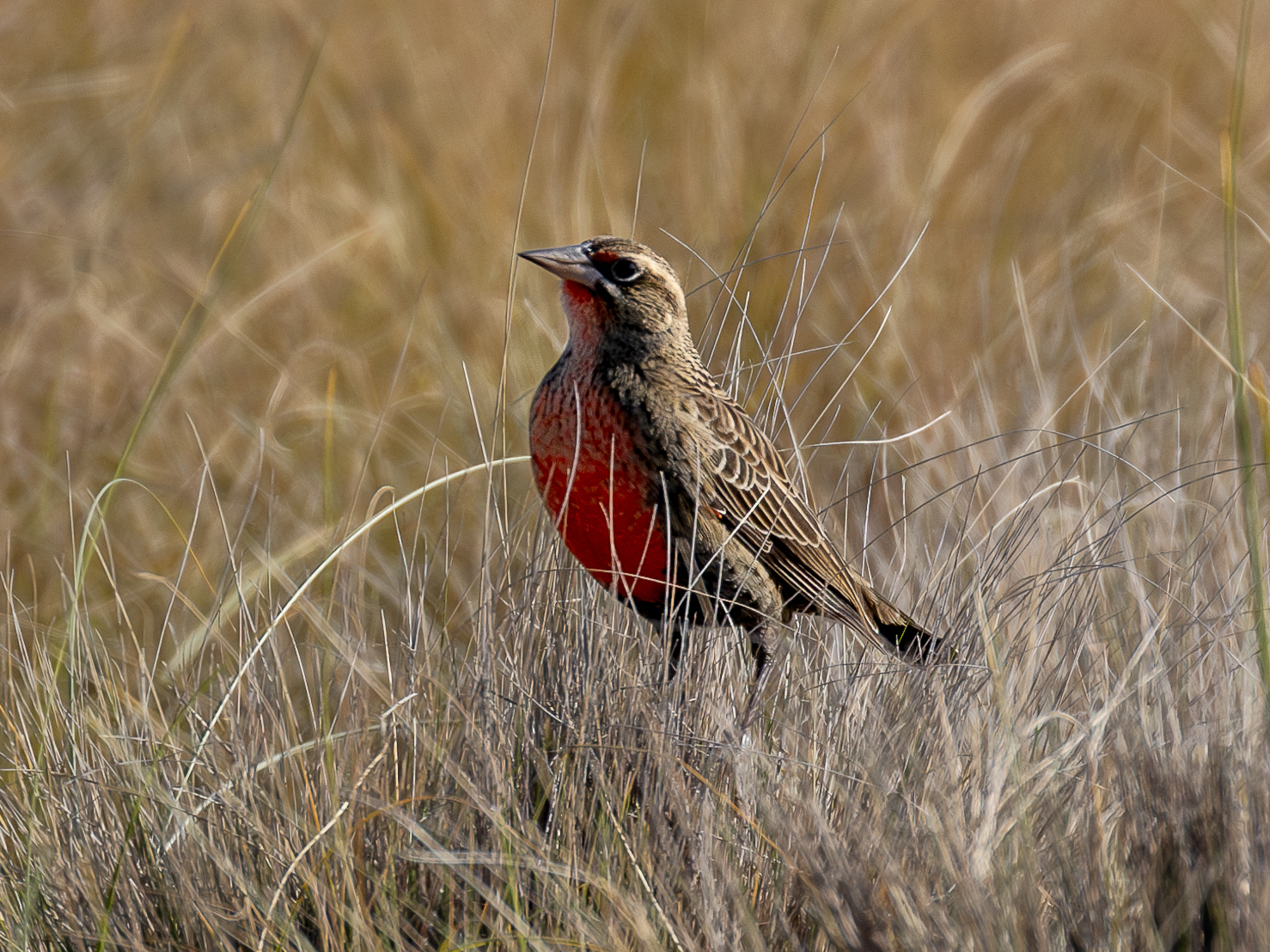
- Male
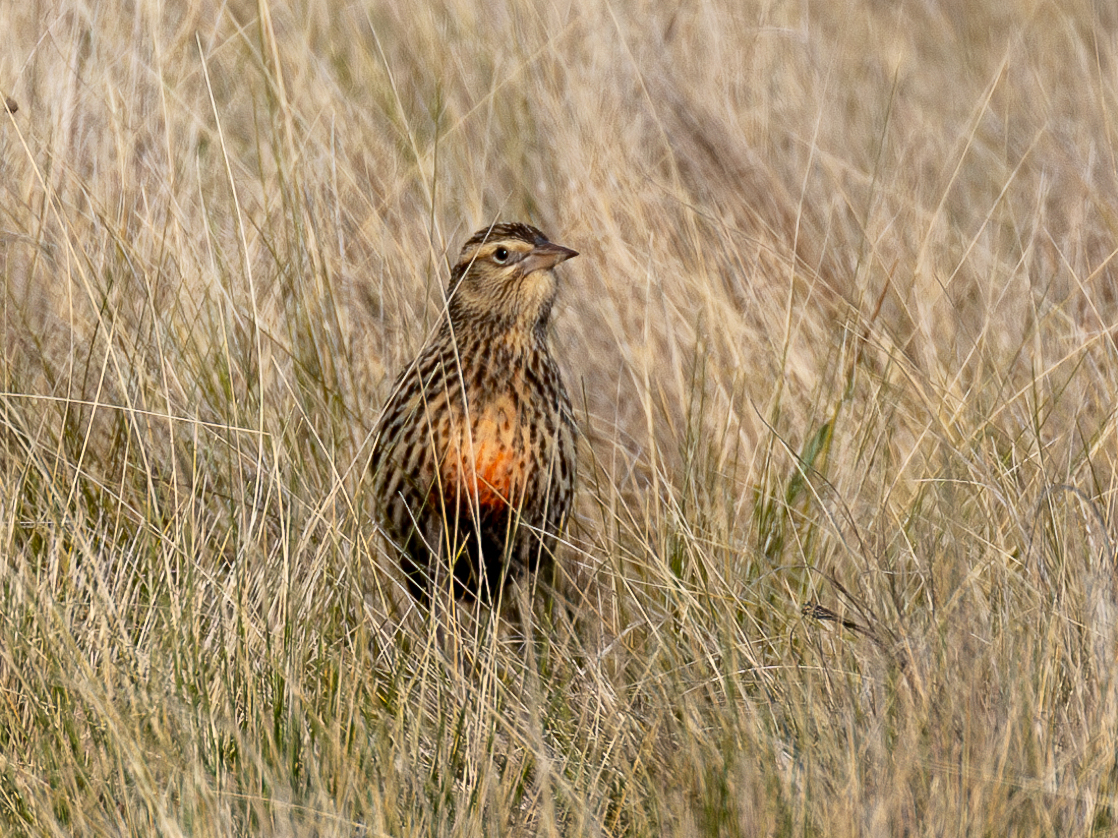
- Female

Conservation status
- Vulnerable (IUCN 3.1)

Scientific classification
- Kingdom: Animalia
- Phylum: Chordata
- Class: Aves
- Order: Passeriformes
- Family: Icteridae
- Genus: Leistes
- Species: L. defilippii

Binomial name
- Leistes defilippii (Bonaparte, 1850)

Synonyms
- see text

= Pampas meadowlark =

Species of bird

The Pampas meadowlark (Leistes defilippii) is a Vulnerable species of bird in the family Icteridae, the oropendolas, New World orioles, and New World blackbirds. It is found in Argentina and Uruguay.

== Taxonomy and systematics ==
The Pampas meadowlark has a complicated taxonomic history. It was formally described in 1850 with the binomial Trupialis militaris. At various other times it has borne the names Sturnella militaris and Sturnella defilippii before its present Leistes defilippii.

The Pampas meadowlark is monotypic.

== Description ==
Pampas meadowlark males average 21 cm (8.3 in) long. Males weigh an average of 74 g (2.6 oz) and females 68 g (2.4 oz). Adult males have a mostly black head with a long supercilium that is red from the bill to the eye and white beyond it, a white lower eyelid, and a short white "moustache". Their upperparts and wings are mostly dusky brown with brownish streaks and some barring on the uppertail coverts. A few wing coverts are rosy red and the underwing coverts are black and red. Their tail is blackish with thin olive bars. Their chin, throat, and breast are rosy red with black sides. Their belly, flanks, and vent are black. Adult females have an all-white supercilium. Their upperparts are paler and browner than the male's. Their throat is white, their central belly is pale pink, and the rest of their underparts are heavily streaked like their back. Both sexes have a dark iris, a silver-gray bill with a dark tip, and dark brown legs and feet. Juveniles resemble adult females with little or red on the belly; they have a horn-colored bill.

== Distribution and habitat ==
The Pampas meadowlark has a highly disjunct distribution. It is found in Uruguay separately in the northern department of Salto and the southwestern department of Flores. In Argentina it is found where Buenos Aires, La Pampa, and Río Negro provinces meet. There are historical records from the Argentinian provinces of Entre Ríos, San Luis, Córdoba, and Corrientes. A population formerly in far southern Brazil's Rio Grande do Sul has been extirpated.

The Pampas meadowlark is found almost exclusively in native grasslands and pastures. It also rarely occurs in actively cultivated fields, though those that have been abandoned for five or more years are used. In elevation it ranges from near sea level to 900 m (3,000 ft).

== Behavior ==
=== Movement ===
As best is known the Pampas meadowlark is a year-round resident.

=== Feeding ===
The Pampas meadowlark feeds on insects and seeds. It forages in flocks that in the non-breeding season may number in the hundreds.

=== Breeding ===
In Argentina the Pampas meadowlark breeds in October and November. It breeds in loose colonies that may have nests less than 1 m (3 ft) apart. Males make a flight display to about 7 m (25 ft) high and sing on the descent. The species' nest is a cup made from grass; it may have a roof and a side entrance. It is built in a depression on the ground amid grass clumps. The clutch is three to five eggs that are buff to gray with darker markings. The incubation period is not known; fledging occurs about 10 days after hatch. Females apparently do most of the feeding of nestlings though males may contribute. The shiny cowbird (Molothrus bonariensis) is a brood parasite.

=== Vocalization ===
In their flight display the male Pampas meadowlarks' song is "variable and rather musical, often combining ascending and descending whistles with a loud sustained note, e.g. tse-tse-réé-tsew-tsee-tsew". When they sing from a perch (usually a grass clump) they add "final buzzy or rasping notes". The species' primary call is "peet".

== Status ==
The IUCN originally in 1988 assessed the Pampas meadowlark as Threatened, then in 1994 as Endangered, and since 2000 as Vulnerable. It has a very limited range and its estimated population of 4000 to 6000 mature individuals is believed to be decreasing, primarily "as a result of landscape conversion for agriculture...Rapid and widespread conversion to sown pastures for cattle-ranching, arable agriculture (mainly soybean, sunflower, maize, wheat and rice) and tree plantations (pine and eucalyptus) are primarily responsible for long-term declines." It is considered rare to locally uncommon and has undergone a drastic contraction of its range and population. "In [the] 1870s and 1890s flocks of many thousands [were] reported in Buenos Aires". Most of this species' range is unprotected though there are some small reserves.
