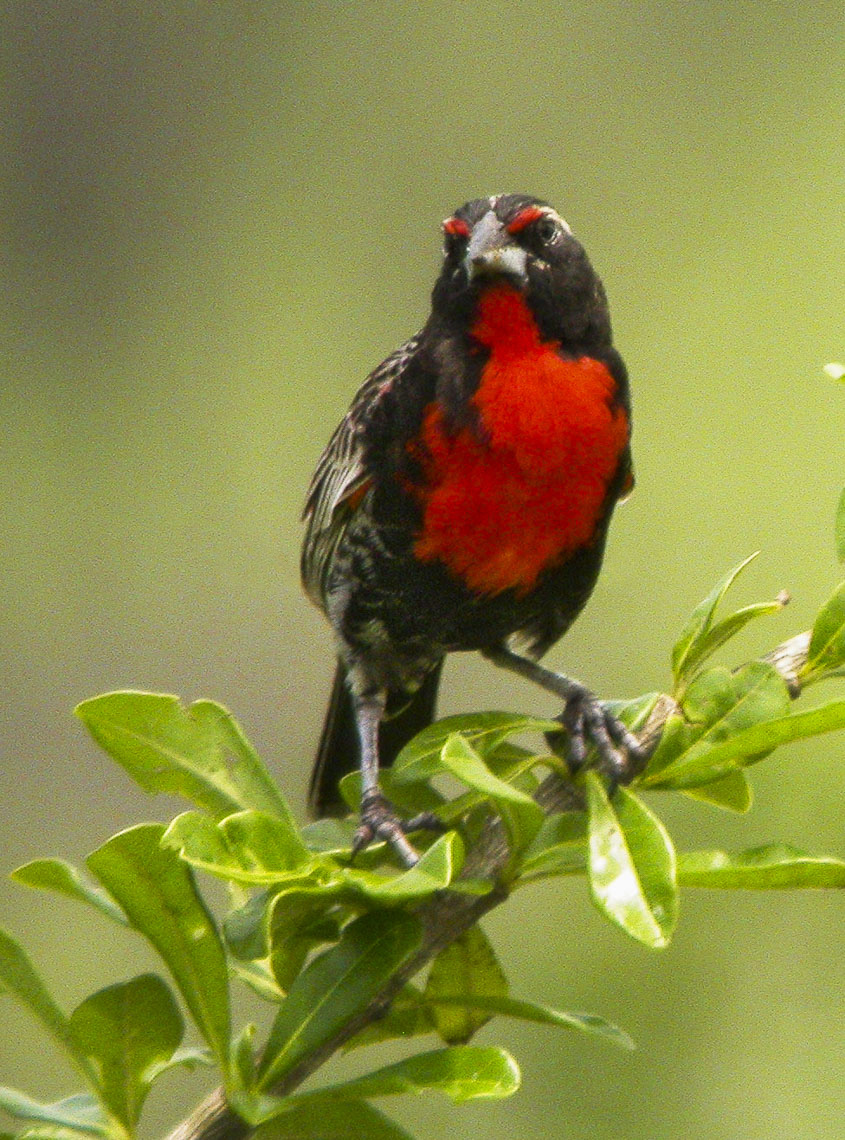

Conservation status
- Least Concern (IUCN 3.1)

Scientific classification
- Kingdom: Animalia
- Phylum: Chordata
- Class: Aves
- Order: Passeriformes
- Family: Icteridae
- Genus: Leistes
- Species: L. bellicosus

Binomial name
- Leistes bellicosus (De Filippi, 1847)

Synonyms
- see text

= Peruvian meadowlark =

Species of bird

The Peruvian meadowlark (Leistes bellicosus) is a species of bird in the family Icteridae, the oropendolas, New World orioles, and New World blackbirds. It is found in Chile, Colombia, Ecuador, and Peru.

== Taxonomy and systematics ==
The Peruvian meadowlark has a complicated taxonomic history. It was formally described in 1847 with the binomial Sturnella bellicosa. For a time it and two other species were separated in genus Pezites. This genus was later again merged into Sturnella. In 2016 BirdLife International's Handbook of the Birds of the World assigned it to its current genus Leistes that had been erected in 1825. By 2019 the IOC, the Clements taxonomy, and the South American Classification Committee had also made the reassignment.

The Peruvian meadowlark has two subspecies, the nominate L. b. bellicosus (De Filippi, 1847) and L. b. albipes (De Filippi & Landbeck, 1861).

== Description ==
The Peruvian meadowlark is about 21 cm (8.3 in) long and weighs 61 to 78 g (2.2 to 2.8 oz); males are larger than females. Adult males of the nominate subspecies have a mostly black head with a white forehead, a long supercilium that is red from the bill to the eye and white beyond it, a white lower eyelid, and a short white "moustache". Their upperparts, wings, and tail are mostly grayish brown with blackish streaks. A few wing coverts are red and the underwing coverts are grayish white. Their chin, throat, and breast are bright red with blackish sides. Their belly is black and their flanks and undertail coverts are striped with buffish gray and black. Adult females have an all-white supercilium. Their upperparts are paler and more dusky than the male's. Their throat is whitish, their central belly is pale red, and the rest of their underparts are pale gray with dusky streaks. Juveniles resemble adult females without the reddis belly and heavier streaking on the underparts. Subspecies L. b. albipes is very like the nominate but smaller and less red. Both sexes of both subspecies have a dark brown iris, a bluish ivory bill with a dusky tip, and gray-brown to blackish legs and feet.

== Distribution and habitat ==
The nominate subspecies of the Peruvian meadowlark is the more northerly of the two. It is found from far southwestern Colombia's Nariño Department south through western Ecuador and western Peru to Junín Department. A 2010 field guide to the birds of Colombia calls it a "recent colonist from [the] south" in that country. Subspecies L. b. albipes is found from Junín south to far northern Chile's Arica and Tarapacá regions. The species inhabits grasslands, pastures, and agricultural areas. In arid coastal regions it occurs in oases and irrigated croplands. In elevation it is found from sea level to 600 m (2,000 ft) in Colombia, locally at least to 2,500 m (8,200 ft) in Ecuador, and to 2,800 m (9,200 ft) in Peru.

== Behavior ==
=== Movement ===
The Peruvian meadowlark is apparently a year-round resident but probably makes some elevational movements in the highlands.

=== Feeding ===
The Peruvian meadowlark's diet has not been studied but is known to include seeds and is thought to also include arthropods, small vertebrates, and a little fruit. It forages primarily on the ground. Outside the breeding season if forms flocks that may number 50 or more individuals.

=== Breeding ===
The Peruvian meadowlark breeds between March and May in Ecuador and in October-November in Chile. Males sing during a vertical flight display. The species nests on the ground, building a cup of grass and stems, often with a dome and a side entrance, and usually in a shallow depression. It is typically hidden in a grass clump or under a shrub. The clutch is four or five eggs in Ecuador and three or four in Chile. The eggs are creamy white to buff with reddish brown and lavender markings. The incubation period is about 14 days and fledging occurs about 12 days after hatch. Details of parental care are not known.

=== Vocalization ===
One description of the male Peruvian meadowlark's display song is "a prolonged wheezy descending note preceded by several short ones, e.g. tee-tee-zho-zhweeeeee". One call is "a short, raspy chak". Another description of the song is "a pleasant series of high, thin whistles and buzzy notes, for example" heeu deer-tu-DZZZZZZZ. Other calls are "a buzzy dzzt, a low chup, and chep".

== Status ==
The IUCN has assessed the Peruvian meadowlark as being of Least Concern. It has a large range; its population size is unknown but is believed to be stable. No immediate threats have been identified. It is "common and conspicuous" in Ecuador and "fairly common to common" in Peru.
