= Index of Nebraska-related articles =

The location of the state of Nebraska in the United States of America

The following is an alphabetical list of articles related to the U.S. state of Nebraska.

== 0–9 ==
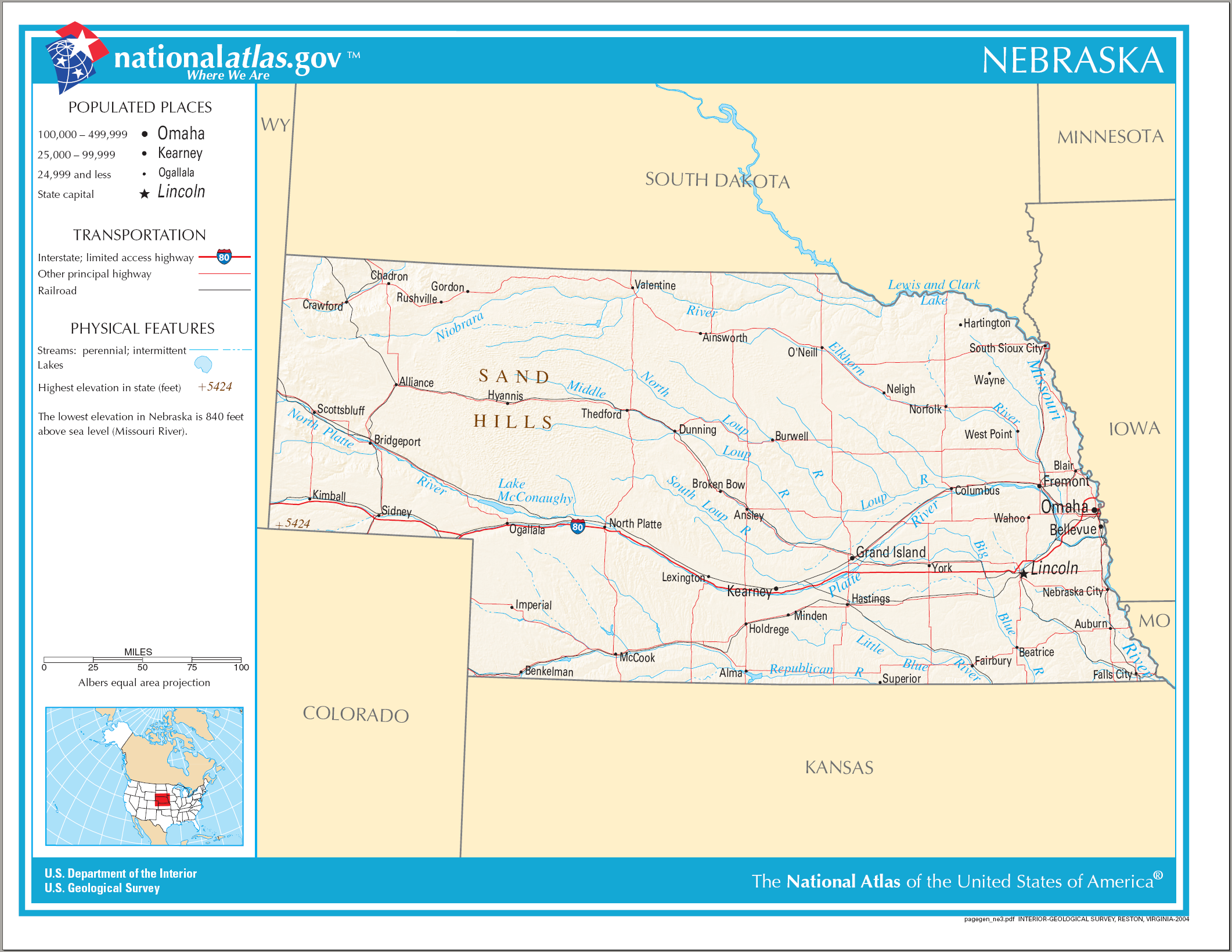
An enlargeable map of the state of Nebraska

- .ne.us – Internet second-level domain for the state of Nebraska
- 37th state to join the United States of America

== A ==
- Adjacent states:
  - State of Colorado
  - State of Iowa
  - State of Kansas
  - State of Missouri
  - State of South Dakota
  - State of Wyoming
- Agriculture in Nebraska
- airports (category)
- American West
  - "Old West" or "Wild West"
- Amusement parks in Nebraska
- Arbor Day
- Arboreta in Nebraska
  - commons:Category:Arboreta in Nebraska
- Archaeology of Nebraska
  - Category:Archaeological sites in Nebraska
    - commons:Category:Archaeological sites in Nebraska
- Architecture of Nebraska
- Art museums and galleries in Nebraska
  - commons:Category:Art museums and galleries in Nebraska
- Astronomical observatories in Nebraska
  - commons:Category:Astronomical observatories in Nebraska

== B ==
- Berkshire Hathaway
- Botanical gardens in Nebraska
  - commons:Category:Botanical gardens in Nebraska
- Boy Scouts of America
  - Scouting in Nebraska
- Buildings and structures in Nebraska
  - commons:Category:Buildings and structures in Nebraska

== C ==
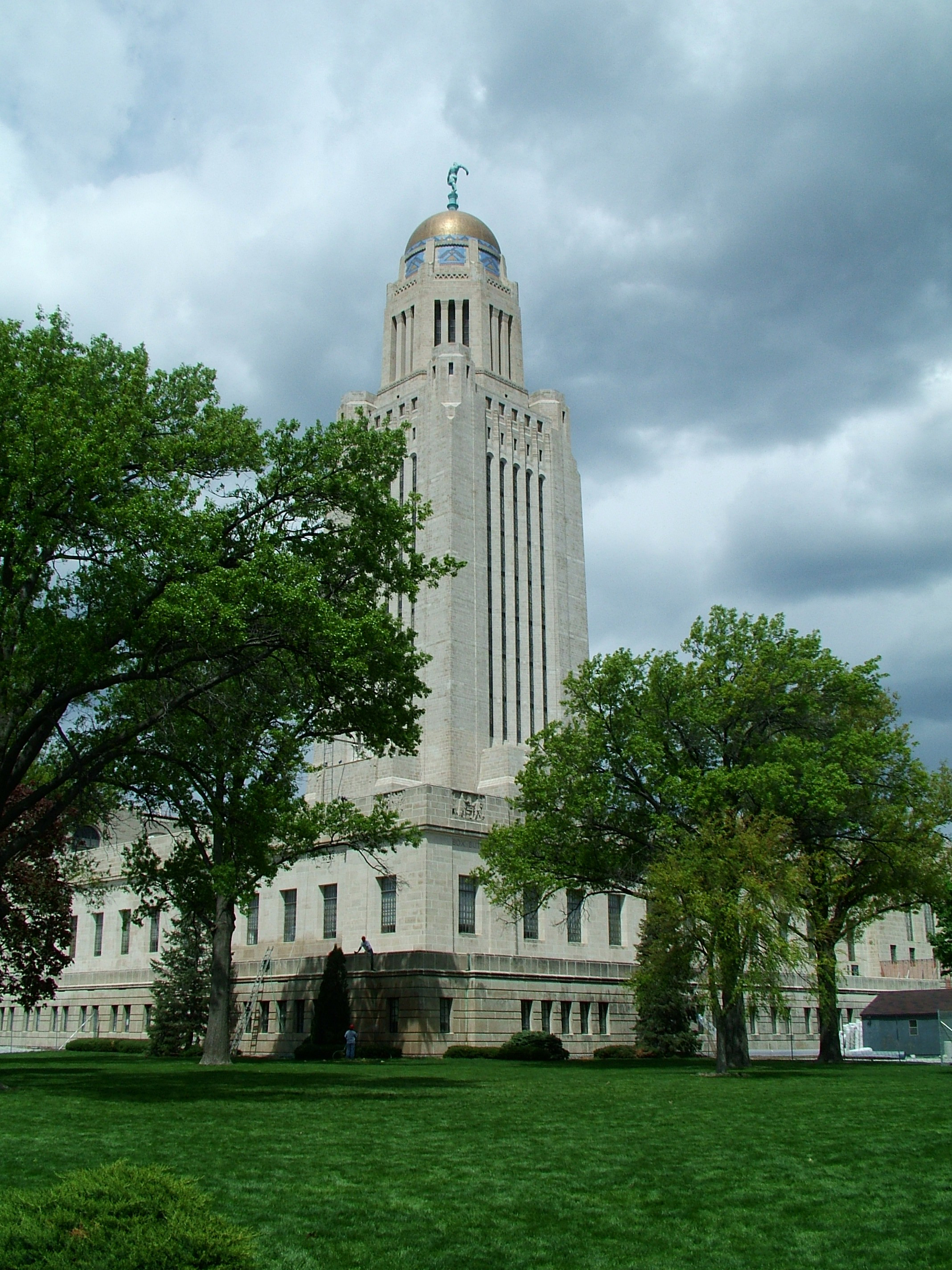
The Nebraska State Capitol in Lincoln

- California Trail
- Capital of the state of Nebraska
- Capital punishment
  - Executions by the state
- Capitol of the State of Nebraska
  - commons:Category:Nebraska State Capitol
- Carhenge (tourist attraction)
- Census Designated Places in Nebraska
- Census statistical areas in Nebraska
- cities
  - state capital
- Climate of Nebraska
- Climate change in Nebraska
- colleges
  - community colleges
- Communications in Nebraska
  - commons:Category:Communications in Nebraska
- companies (category)
- congressional districts
  U.S. House of Representatives (District 1, 2, 3, 4, 5, 6)
- legislators
  - state (category)
  - federal
- Convention centers in Nebraska
  - commons:Category:Convention centers in Nebraska

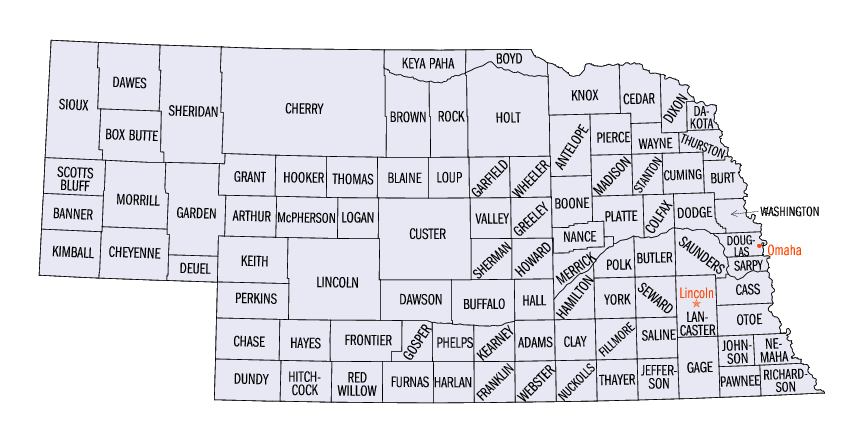
An enlargeable map of the 93 counties of the state of Nebraska

- cottonwood
- Counties of the state of Nebraska
  - commons:Category:Counties in Nebraska
  - name etymologies
- Culture of Nebraska
  - Category:Culture of Nebraska
    - commons:Category:Nebraska culture
  - breweries (category)
  - Omaha (category)
  - museums (category)
  - musical groups (category)
  - religion (category)
    - churches (category)
  - theaters (category)
  - writers (category)

== D ==
- Demographics of Nebraska
- Dust Bowl
- Nebraska Department of Roads

== E ==
- East Omaha
- Economy of Nebraska
  - Category:Economy of Nebraska
    - commons:Category:Economy of Nebraska
- Education in Nebraska
  - Category:Education in Nebraska
    - commons:Category:Education in Nebraska
  - colleges and universities
  - high schools
  - school districts
- Category:Elections in Nebraska
  - commons:Category:Elections in Nebraska
- Category:Environment of Nebraska
  - commons:Category:Environment of Nebraska
- executions

== F ==
The flag of the state of Nebraska

- Farming
- Festivals in Nebraska
  - commons:Category:Festivals in Nebraska
- Flag of the state of Nebraska
- Ford, Gerald Rudolph, Jr.
- Forts in Nebraska
  - Category:Forts in Nebraska
    - commons:Category:Forts in Nebraska

== G ==
The Great Seal of the State of Nebraska

- Geography of Nebraska
  - Category:Geography of Nebraska
    - commons:Category:Geography of Nebraska
- Geology of Nebraska
  - commons:Category:Geology of Nebraska
- Ghost towns in Nebraska
  - Category:Ghost towns in Nebraska
    - commons:Category:Ghost towns in Nebraska
- Goldenrod
- Government of the state of Nebraska website
  - Category:Government of Nebraska
    - commons:Category:Government of Nebraska
- government agencies
  - Nebraska Game and Parks Commission
- Governor of the state of Nebraska
  - List of governors of the territory of Nebraska
  - List of governors of the state of Nebraska
- Great Plains
- Great Seal of the State of Nebraska

== H ==
- Heritage railroads in Nebraska
  - commons:Category:Heritage railroads in Nebraska
- Highway routes in Nebraska
  - Lincoln Highway
  - list
  - interstate (category)
  - Nebraska Department of Roads (category)
  - state (category)
  - U.S. (category)
- Hiking trails in Nebraska
  - commons:Category:Hiking trails in Nebraska
- History of Nebraska
  - Historical figures
  - Historical outline of Nebraska
- Homestead Act
- hospitals
- Houses (category)

== I ==
- Images of Nebraska
  - commons:Category:Nebraska
- Interstate Highways (category)
  - commons:Category:Nebraska Department of Roads

== J ==
- Job's Daughters was founded in Omaha in 1920 by Ethel T. Wead Mick.
- Nebraska Juvenile Courts

== K ==
- Kansas–Nebraska Act

== L ==
- Lakes of Nebraska
  - commons:Category:Lakes of Nebraska
- Lancaster, Nebraska Territory
- Landmarks in Nebraska
  - commons:Category:Landmarks in Nebraska
- law
  - executions by the state
- Lincoln, Nebraska, territorial and state capital since 1867
  - Buildings and structures (category)
- Lincoln Highway
- Lists related to the state of Nebraska:
  - List of airports in Nebraska
  - List of census statistical areas in Nebraska
  - List of cities in Nebraska
  - List of colleges and universities in Nebraska
  - List of counties in Nebraska
  - List of dams and reservoirs in Nebraska
  - List of forts in Nebraska
  - List of ghost towns in Nebraska
  - List of governors of Nebraska
  - List of high schools in Nebraska
  - List of highway routes in Nebraska
  - List of hospitals in Nebraska
  - List of individuals executed in Nebraska
  - List of lakes in Nebraska
  - List of law enforcement agencies in Nebraska
  - List of museums in Nebraska
  - List of National Historic Landmarks in Nebraska
  - List of newspapers in Nebraska
  - List of people from Nebraska
  - List of power stations in Nebraska
  - List of radio stations in Nebraska
  - List of railroads in Nebraska
  - List of Registered Historic Places in Nebraska
  - List of rivers of Nebraska
  - List of school districts in Nebraska
  - List of state parks in Nebraska
  - List of state prisons in Nebraska
  - List of symbols of the state of Nebraska
  - List of television stations in Nebraska
  - List of Nebraska's congressional delegations
  - List of United States congressional districts in Nebraska
  - List of United States representatives from Nebraska
  - List of United States senators from Nebraska
  - List of villages in Nebraska
- Louisiana Purchase

== M ==
- Maps of Nebraska
  - commons:Category:Maps of Nebraska
- meadowlark
- metropolitan areas
  - Omaha
  - Lincoln
  - Sioux City
- Midwestern United States
- Missouri River
- Mormon Trail
- Mountains of Nebraska
  - commons:Category:Mountains of Nebraska
- Museums in Nebraska
  - Category:Museums in Nebraska
    - commons:Category:Museums in Nebraska
- Music of Nebraska
  - commons:Category:Music of Nebraska
  - Category:Musical groups from Nebraska
  - Category:Musicians from Nebraska

== N ==
- National forests of Nebraska
  - commons:Category:National Forests of Nebraska
- National Recreation Trails in Nebraska
- National Wildlife Refuges (category)
- Natural history of Nebraska
  - commons:Category:Natural history of Nebraska
- Nature centers in Nebraska
  - commons:Category:Nature centers in Nebraska
- navy ships named USS Nebraska
- NE – United States Postal Service postal code for the state of Nebraska
- Nebraska website
  - Category:Nebraska
    - commons:Category:Nebraska
      - commons:Category:Maps of Nebraska
- Nebraska Extreme
- Nebraska Library Commission
- Nebraska Religious Coalition for Science Education
- Nebraska State Capitol
- Nebraska State Historical Society
- Nebraska State Patrol
- List of newspapers in Nebraska
- North Omaha
- North Platte River

== O ==
- Old West
- Omaha, Nebraska, territorial capital 1854-1867

- See here for a complete listing of categories.

- Oregon Trail
- Outdoor sculptures in Nebraska
  - commons:Category:Outdoor sculptures in Nebraska
- Olson Nature Preserve

== P ==
- Prairie
- Nebraska Panhandle
- Panorama Point
- parks, state
- People from Nebraska
  - Category:People from Nebraska
    - commons:Category:People from Nebraska
    - Category:People from Nebraska by populated place
    - Category:People from Nebraska by county
    - Category:People from Nebraska by occupation
- Pine Ridge
- Platte River
- politicians (category)
- Politics of Nebraska
  - commons:Category:Politics of Nebraska
- prisons, state
- Protected areas of Nebraska
  - commons:Category:Protected areas of Nebraska

== R ==
- radio stations
- railroads
  - Union Pacific
- Rainwater Basin
- Registered Historic Places
- Religion in Nebraska
  - Category:Religion in Nebraska
    - commons:Category:Religion in Nebraska
- Rivers of Nebraska
  - Missouri River
  - Platte River
  - Category:Rivers of Nebraska
    - commons:Category:Rivers of Nebraska
- Roads
- Rock formations in Nebraska
  - commons:Category:Rock formations in Nebraska

== S ==
- Spade Ranch
- Sandhills
- school districts
- high schools
- Scouting in Nebraska
- seal
- senators
- Settlements in Nebraska
  - Cities in Nebraska
  - Villages in Nebraska
  - Townships in Nebraska
  - Census Designated Places in Nebraska
  - Other unincorporated communities in Nebraska
  - List of ghost towns in Nebraska
- slavery
  - state (category)
  - United States
- ships of the U.S. Navy, USS Nebraska
- Smith Falls
- Sports in Nebraska
  - Category:Sports in Nebraska
    - commons:Category:Sports in Nebraska
  - Category:Sports venues in Nebraska
    - commons:Category:Sports venues in Nebraska
- State of Nebraska website
  - Government of the state of Nebraska
    - Category:Government of Nebraska
      - commons:Category:Government of Nebraska
- state highways (category)
- State Patrol of Nebraska
- state prisons
- state universities
- Structures in Nebraska
  - commons:Category:Buildings and structures in Nebraska
- Symbols of the state of Nebraska
  - Category:Symbols of Nebraska
    - commons:Category:Symbols of Nebraska

== T ==
- Telecommunications in Nebraska
  - commons:Category:Communications in Nebraska
- Telephone area codes in Nebraska
- television stations
- Territory of Dakota, (1861–1882)-1889
- Territory of Louisiana, 1805–1812
- Territory of Missouri, 1812–1821
- Territory of Nebraska, 1854–1867
- Tourism in Nebraska website
  - commons:Category:Tourism in Nebraska
- Transportation in Nebraska
  - Category:Transportation in Nebraska
    - commons:Category:Transport in Nebraska

== U ==
- Unincorporated communities in Nebraska
- United States of America
  - States of the United States of America
  - United States census statistical areas of Nebraska
  - Nebraska's congressional delegations
  - United States congressional districts in Nebraska
  - United States Court of Appeals for the Eighth Circuit
  - United States District Court for the District of Nebraska
  - United States representatives from Nebraska
  - United States senators from Nebraska
- Universities and colleges in Nebraska
- U.S. highway routes in Nebraska
- US-NE – ISO 3166-2:US region code for the state of Nebraska
- USS Nebraska

== V ==
- Villages in Nebraska

== W ==
- Waterfalls of Nebraska
  - commons:Category:Waterfalls of Nebraska
  Wikimedia
  - Wikimedia Commons:Category:Nebraska
    - commons:Category:Maps of Nebraska
  - Wikinews:Category:Nebraska
    - Wikinews:Portal:Nebraska
  - Wikipedia Category:Nebraska
    - Wikipedia:WikiProject Nebraska
      - Category:WikiProject Nebraska articles
      - Category:WikiProject Nebraska participants
- wildlife
  - cougar
  - coyote
  - hunting
  - meadowlark
  - National Wildlife Refuges (category)
  - pronghorn
  - white-tailed deer
- Wild West
- Wildcat Hills

== Z ==
- Zoos in Nebraska
  - commons:Category:Zoos in Nebraska

== See also ==
- Topic overview:
  - Nebraska
  - Outline of Nebraska
- National Register of Historic Places listings in Nebraska
