= John McCollister =

John McCollister may refer to:

- John Y. McCollister (1921–2013), Nebraska politician, member of U.S. House of Representatives
- John S. McCollister (b. 1947), Nebraska politician, son of John Y. McCollister
