= Columbus Police =

Columbus Police could refer to several police departments in the United States, including:

- Columbus, Georgia Police Department, a local law enforcement agency in Georgia
- Columbus, Indiana Police Department, a local law enforcement agency in Indiana
- Columbus, Kansas Police Department, a local law enforcement agency in Kansas
- Columbus, Mississippi Police Department, a local law enforcement agency in Mississippi
- Columbus, Nebraska Police Department, a local law enforcement agency in Nebraska
- Columbus, North Carolina Police Department, a local law enforcement agency in North Carolina
- Columbus Division of Police, the main policing unit for the city of Columbus, Ohio
- Columbus, Texas Police Department, a local law enforcement agency in Texas
