= John S. McCollister =

American politician from Nebraska

John McCollister

Member of the Nebraska Legislature from the 20th district
- In office January 7, 2015 – January 4, 2023
- Preceded by: Brad Ashford
- Succeeded by: John Fredrickson

Personal details
- Born: April 29, 1947 (age 79) Moline, Illinois, U.S.
- Party: Republican
- Education: University of Nebraska–Lincoln (BS)

John S. McCollister (born April 29, 1947) is an American politician who served as a member of the Nebraska Legislature from 2015 to 2023, representing Omaha's District 20. McCollister is a moderate member of the Republican Party.

== Early life and education ==
McCollister was born April 29, 1947, in Moline, Illinois. His paternal grandfather, John M. McCollister, had founded McCollister & Co., an industrial-lubricants business, in 1931. At the time of McCollister's birth, his father, John Y. McCollister, worked in sales for IBM in Illinois and in Iowa.

In 1966, McCollister graduated from Westside High School in Omaha. He attended the University of Nebraska–Lincoln, receiving a Bachelor of Science in business administration in 1971.

== Career ==
After graduating from college, McCollister went to work at McCollister & Co. He remained with the company until 2006, when it was sold to farm cooperative Growmark.

=== Local politics ===
From 1979 to 2008, McCollister served five terms on the board of the Metropolitan Utilities District, a public utility that provides gas and water to the Omaha area.

In 2008, McCollister ran as the Republican candidate for a seat on the Nebraska Public Service Commission, which regulates railroads, major utility lines, and passenger carriers in the state; he sought to unseat the incumbent, Democrat Anne Boyle. McCollister stated that cell-phone bills in Nebraska were too high, and called for reductions in state taxes on telephone service; Boyle maintained that the existing taxes were necessary to provide affordable service to rural areas, and to make it possible to establish the geographic origins of cell-phone calls to emergency number 911. The two candidates together spent over $120,000 for their campaigns, setting a record for spending in a Public Service Commission race. In the general election, Boyle won with 61.8% of the vote to McCollister's 33.4% and Green Party candidate Doug Paterson's 4.9%.

In early 2009, McCollister was named executive director of the Platte Institute for Economic Research, a nonprofit organization often described as "conservative", and self-described as "Nebraska's first Free Market think tank". He held that position for nearly four years.

=== Nebraska legislature ===
==== 2014 election ====
In late 2013, McCollister announced that he would run for the Nebraska Legislature from south central Omaha's 20th District. The incumbent, Brad Ashford, was precluded by Nebraska's term-limits law from running for a third consecutive term; he subsequently announced that he would run as a Democrat for a seat in the U.S. House of Representatives.

In the nonpartisan primary, McCollister faced two registered Democrats: Matt Lathrop, an Omaha trial lawyer, whose brother, Steve Lathrop, then represented another Omaha district in the state legislature; and Laura Baumgartner, a 25-year-old project manager for an Omaha advertising agency. When the primary election was held, McCollister received 3389 votes, or 49.5% of the total; Lathrop, 2227 votes, or 32.5%; and Baumgartner, 1232 votes, or 18.0%.

As the top two vote-getters, McCollister and Lathrop moved on to the general election. Both candidates expressed concern about the growth of partisanship in the officially nonpartisan legislature; both stated that high taxes were a concern; both asserted that it was necessary to adequately fund education; and both favored prison- and sentencing reform. McCollister declared that the legislature needed more businessmen and fewer lawyers; Lathrop maintained that his training in mediation would help him to find satisfactory compromises between conflicting interests.

Both campaigns spent in excess of $100,000. McCollister's organization raised about $150,000 and spent about $185,000; major contributors included the Nebraska Bankers, the Greater Omaha Chamber of Commerce, and the Nebraska Chamber of Commerce and Industry. The Lathrop campaign raised about $154,000, and spent about $146,000; his principal contributor was the Nebraska State Education Association, which yielded over $25,000 in cash and in-kind contributions; other significant contributors included the International Brotherhood of Electrical Workers, the Nebraska Association of Trial Lawyers, the United Transportation Union, and Firefighters for Better Government. The Nebraska Realtors PAC contributed to both candidates: $4000 to McCollister and $2000 to Lathrop.

Turnout for the general election was about twice that of the primary. McCollister won, with 6409 votes, or 52.1% of the total; Lathrop obtained 5898 votes, or 47.9%.

==== 2015 session ====
In the 2015 session of the legislature, McCollister was named vice chair of the Urban Affairs Committee; he was also seated on the Business and Labor Committee and the Natural Resources Committee.

=== National policy ===
In August 2019, McCollister was widely quoted in the national press for having stated that "The Republican Party is enabling white supremacy in our country", after the 2019 El Paso shooting. The Nebraska Republican Party rejected him.

A column written in December 2019, after the Midwestern U.S. floods, emphasized the importance of renewable energy for Nebraska in the face of climate change. McCollister praised the Omaha Public Power District for committing to becoming 100% carbon free. In addition to solar, he stated that "Nebraska has the third best wind energy generating potential of any state," and emphasized the employment impact of wind energy projects.

During the 2020 presidential election, McCollister endorsed the Democratic Party nominee Joe Biden and encouraged other Republicans to "get on the right side of history". On October 9, 2020, he endorsed Kara Eastman, the progressive Democrat running against Republican Congressman Don Bacon.
