= Flag of Nebraska =

U.S. state flag

State of Nebraska
- Use: Civil and state flag
- Proportion: Not specified
- Adopted: April 2, 1925 (as state banner); July 16, 1963 (as official state flag)
- Design: The great seal of Nebraska in gold and silver on a blue field.
- Designed by: Florence Hazen Miller

The flag of the U.S. state of Nebraska, was adopted in 1925. It features a blue field with the Nebraskan state seal at its center, rendered in gold and silver colors. The flag was adopted following the introduction of a bill by Representative J. Lloyd McMaster in the former Nebraska House of Representatives.

In 1925, the legislature ratified the design as a state banner. It was officially designated as the state flag in 1963, making Nebraska one of the last states to adopt an official flag.

== Official description ==
State law regulates the design of the Nebraska state flag, specifying its official form as follows:

...a reproduction of the great seal of the state, charged on the center in gold and silver on a field of national blue.

=== Design of the seal ===
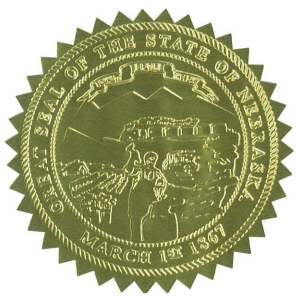
Seal of the State of Nebraska, Embossed (2025)

The Nebraska state seal was formally adopted in 1867. It features several symbols: a steamboat ascending the Missouri River; the mechanical arts, represented by a blacksmith with hammer and anvil; agriculture, represented by a settler's cabin, sheaves of wheat, and stalks of growing corn; and a train of railroad cars heading toward the Rocky Mountains. At the top of the seal is Nebraska's state motto: 'Equality Before the Law'.

The law does not prescribe exact shades, proportions, or other technical specifications of the seal. The Great Seal is, in law, to be "kept and used by the Secretary of State." As a physical device, the engraved die used to create its embossed impression determines its design.

== History ==
=== Pre-official flags (before 1925) ===
The state seal which appears on the current flag was designed in 1867 and had appeared on several banners prior to the adoption of the official state flag in 1925.

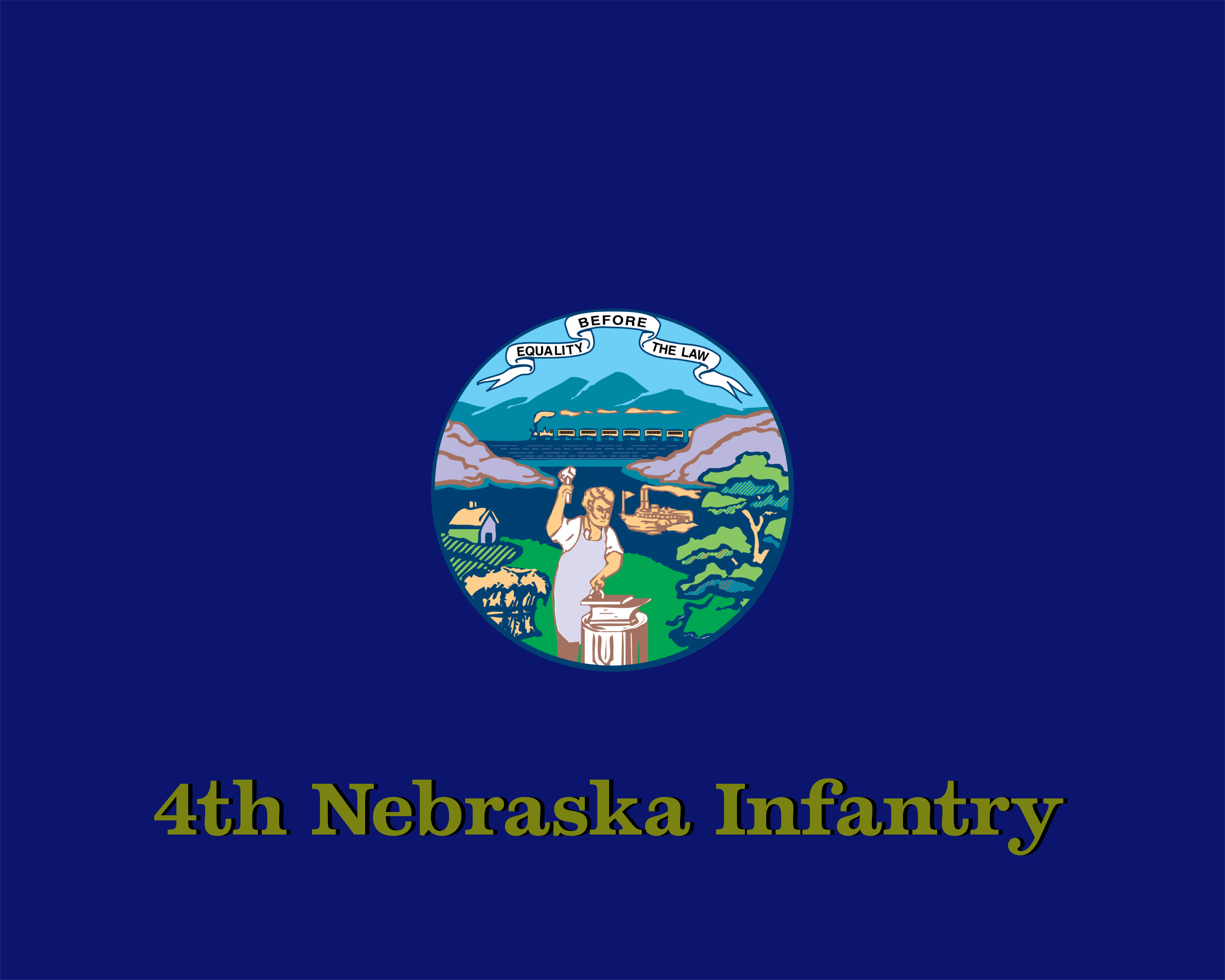
The 4th Nebraska Infantry Regimental flag, per description.

From 1889 to 1916 it is documented that Nebraska military regiments and companies carried blue flags featuring the state seal or coat of arms, sometimes with additional gold lettering naming the unit. A variation used by Company E of the 1st Nebraska Infantry combined the state coat of arms with the design of the United States flag, placing it in the blue canton on the reverse side.

From 1876 to 1924 there have also been several other, more unique flags documented. A red banner with a white and red border along with the state's name was displayed at the 1876 Centennial Exhibition. Another design used in 1924 featured a map of the state, an image of the new capitol building, and the state's name.

A number of sources mention "state flags" without describing their appearance. These include flags displayed at political events, public receptions, parades, ceremonies, and as awards or trophies.

=== Current flag (1925–present) ===
Nebraska did not adopt a state flag until 1925, and its path to doing so began several years earlier. In 1921 the legislature considered HR 571, a proposal that aimed to update the state seal (originally created in 1867) and to feature the redesigned seal on a new state banner. The flag was described as: "...that the emblem and motto of the state seal shall appear in lettering of gold and silver on a field of blue..." Representative George A. Williams of Fairmont introduced the measure at the encouragement of the Nebraska Society of the Daughters of the American Revolution (DAR), whose primary interest lay in securing an official flag for the state. Years prior, in March, 1915 the Nebraska Sons of the American Revolution had too endorsed the idea of adopting a state flag. Although the origins of the DAR's involvement are unclear, the organization announced early that year that progress toward obtaining legislation for a state banner was well underway.

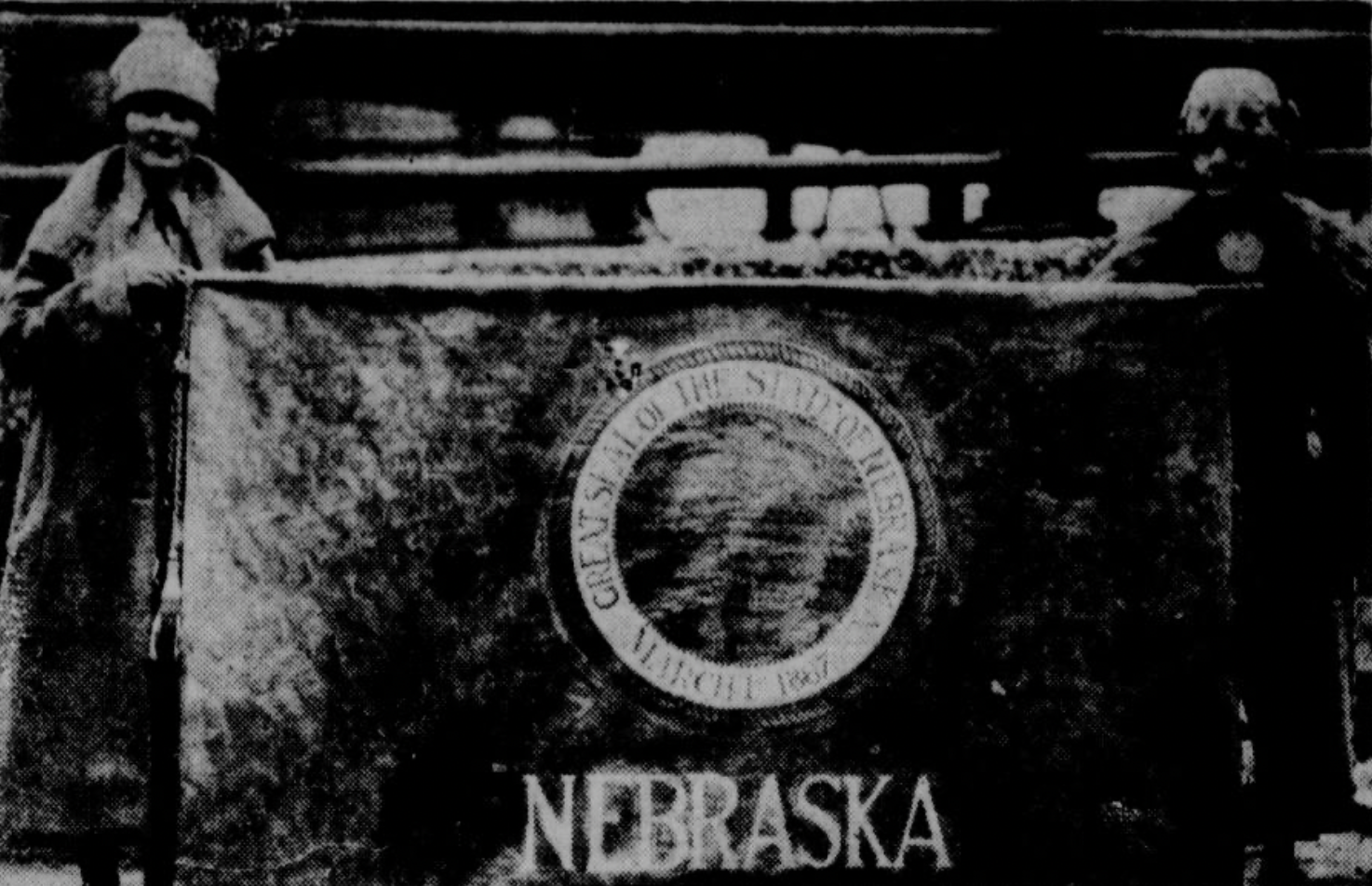
Early variant of the state flag from April 1925. Bearing the state's name below the state seal

With construction of a new Nebraska State Capitol beginning, many saw an opportunity to create a new, more distinguished seal for the building and for use on a future flag. After HR 571 became law, Governor Samuel R. McKelvie created a commission led by Williams to select a new seal design. The winning submission came from B. G. Goodhue, architect of the new capitol, whose heraldic composition included antelope supporters, a buffalo crest, and symbols of the state motto "Equality Before the Law."

Despite the commission's work, the redesigned seal never gained legislative approval. A 1923 attempt to adopt it died in committee, and because the new banner envisioned by the earlier bill was tied to the revised seal, Nebraska remained without an official flag. This absence caused increasing frustration, especially for DAR member Florence Hazen Miller of Crete, who received frequent inquiries from Washington, D.C., requesting a Nebraska flag for ceremonial display. Determined to resolve what advocates saw as an embarrassment, Miller traveled the state rallying support.

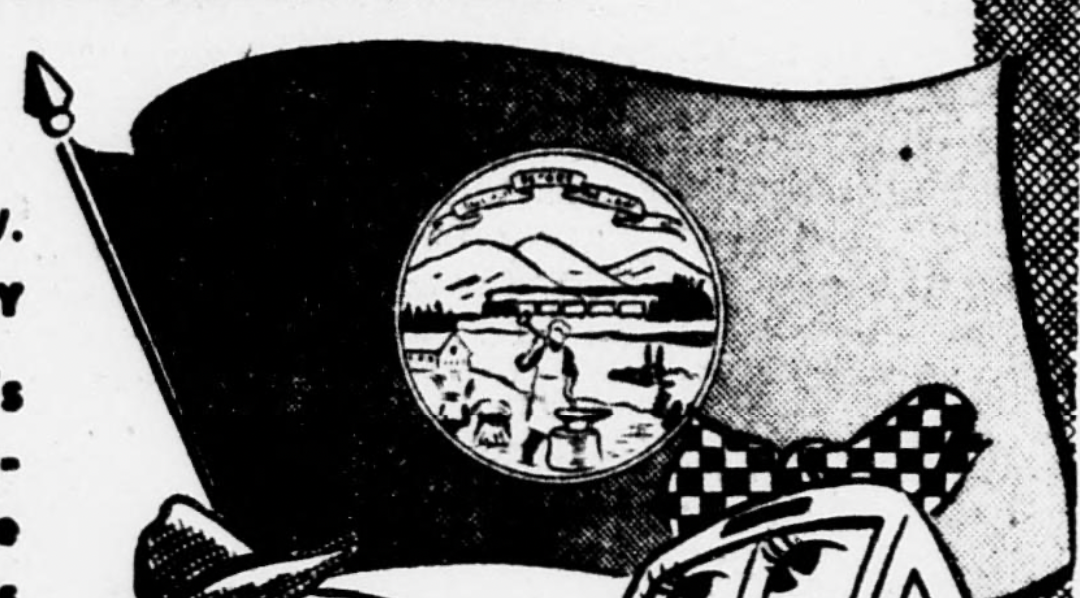
Illustration of the state flag from 1948

Her efforts paid off in 1925 when Representative J. Lloyd McMaster introduced HR 67, a bill to establish a state banner. Unlike earlier proposals, this bill simply placed the existing state seal on a field of national blue, avoiding the stalled redesign entirely. HR 67 passed easily, and a small committee including McMaster and Miller was appointed to produce the first official banner. The finished flag was formally presented to Governor Adam McMullen on July 16, 1925. In Crete, however, a smaller version of the new banner had already been raised at the very moment the law took effect on July 1, likely by Miller herself.

In 1953, there was a variant of the state flag with a fully colored seal, it was given to Seward, Alaska civic center.

In 1963 the banner was formally redesignated as Nebraska's "official state flag," granting it the same placement privileges as the U.S. flag.

=== Other flag ===
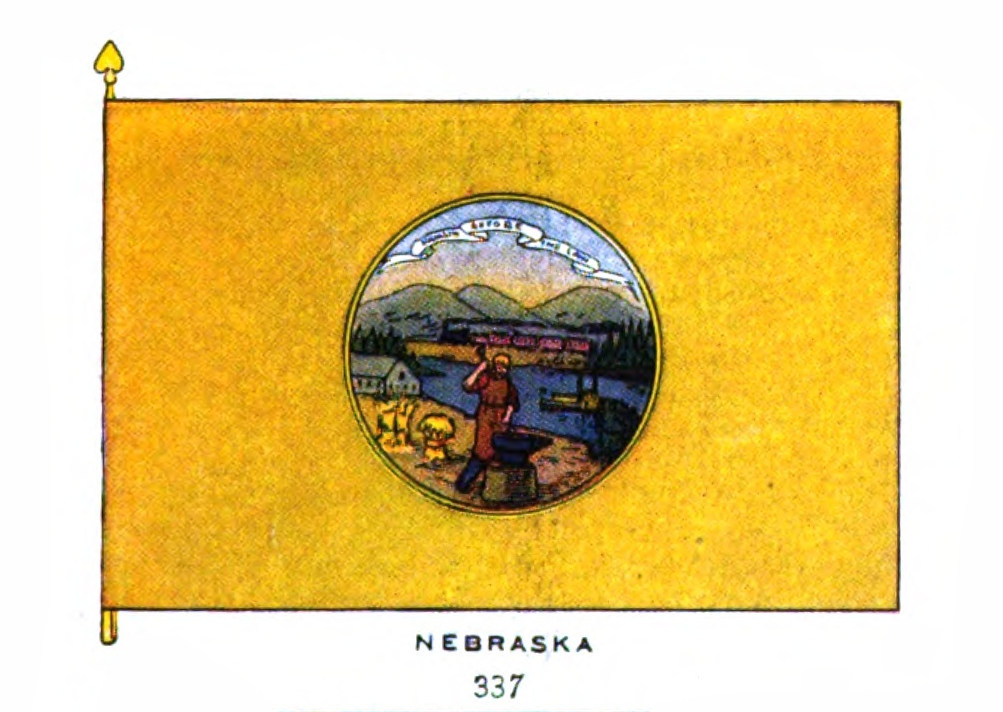
The "Nebraska state flag" created for National Geographic in the absence of an official design.

The state seal on a ground of corn yellow. Adopted by the Thirty-fourth Legislature of 1915.

In 1925 when the bill to establish a state banner was introduced, debate briefly flared when some Nebraskans claimed the state already had a flag, citing a 1917 National Geographic illustration depicting a yellow flag with the seal. The magazine later clarified that this was merely the unofficial banner carried by the Nebraska National Guard, created in the absence of an official design.

In March 1915, Mattson introduced a flag bill on the house floor that pass 83 to 0. In November, after an inquiry from the navy department, the Adjutant General reported that, as far as he could ascertain, Nebraska had no state flag. He noted that the last legislature had adopted a design for one (described as the state seal on a ground of corn yellow) but that no appropriation had been made, and no flags had been manufactured. In the context of the Adjutant General's statement, "the last legislature" refers to the most recent completed legislative session which was the Thirty-fourth Legislature of 1915 (Jan–Mar), and "no appropriation" means that the legislature did not allocate any funding to production, purchase, or distribution of the flag.

In 1924, a copy of the yellow state flag was made by Railway Mail Service of association of Lincoln and Omaha to be sent to the Post office department building In Washington D.C.

=== Attempts to change the flag ===
In 1972, Senator Eugene Mahoney attempted to spark a redesign, calling the existing flag unattractive and an inadequate state symbol. Public response overwhelmingly rejected the idea, with newspaper polls showing Nebraskans firmly opposed to changing the design. Conceding defeat, Mahoney abandoned the effort.

In 2001, the North American Vexillological Association (NAVA) surveyed its members on the designs of 72 flags from U.S. states, U.S. territories, and Canadian provinces. Nebraska's flag was rated 71st, or as the second worst.

Following the publication of the survey results, in 2002 the Nebraska Legislature's Government, Military and Veterans Affairs Committee considered a bill to create a commission to propose new flag designs to the Legislature. However, the flag was not changed.

In 2017, State Senator Burke Harr proposed a task force charged with redesigning the flag, citing an incident in which the flag had flown upside down at the state capitol for ten days without anyone noticing. Harr hoped for a redesign in time for the State's 150th anniversary. The State Senate committee ultimately declined to take action.

== Gallery ==
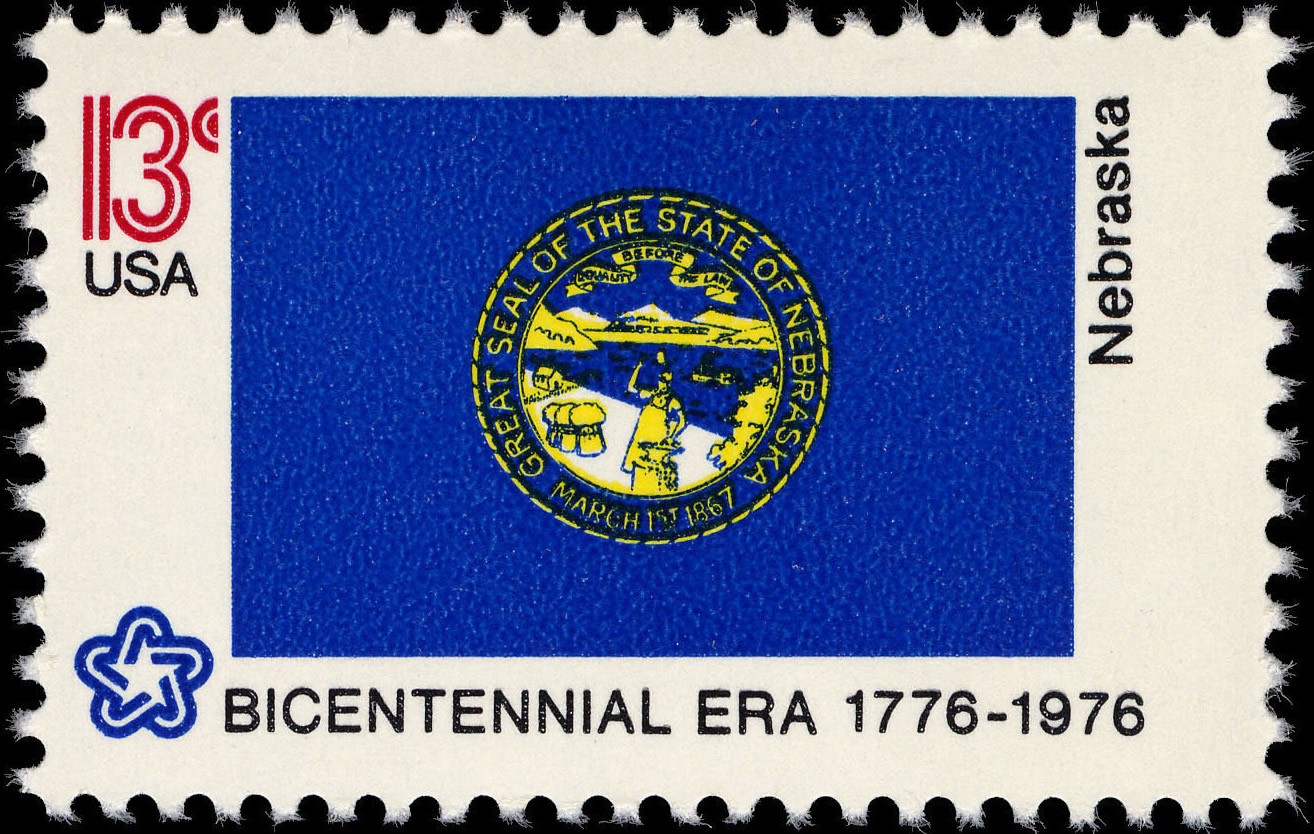
The Nebraska state flag as depicted in the 1976 bicentennial postage stamp series

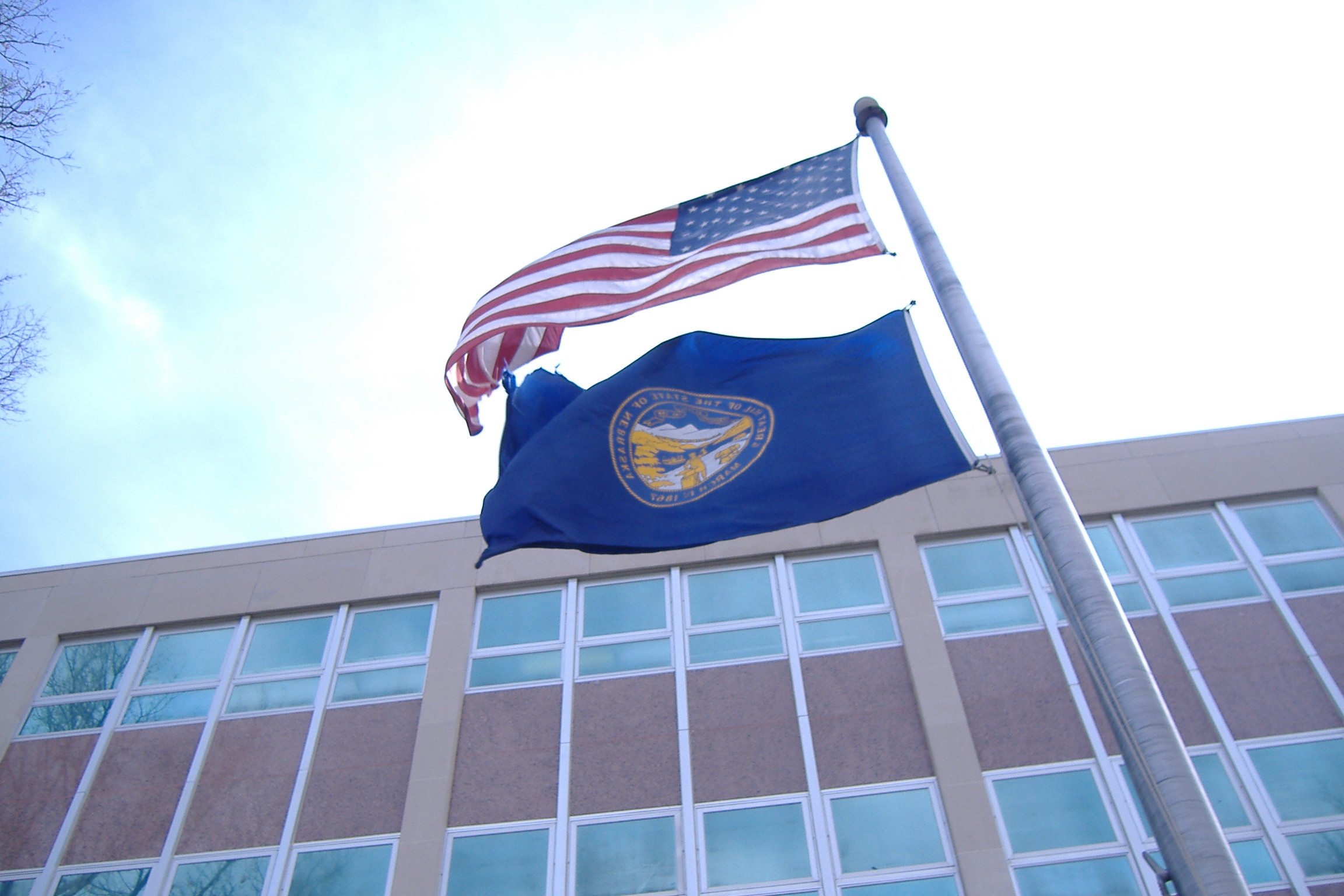
Flag of Nebraska seen with the seal size limited to the center of the flag with a gold coloring used

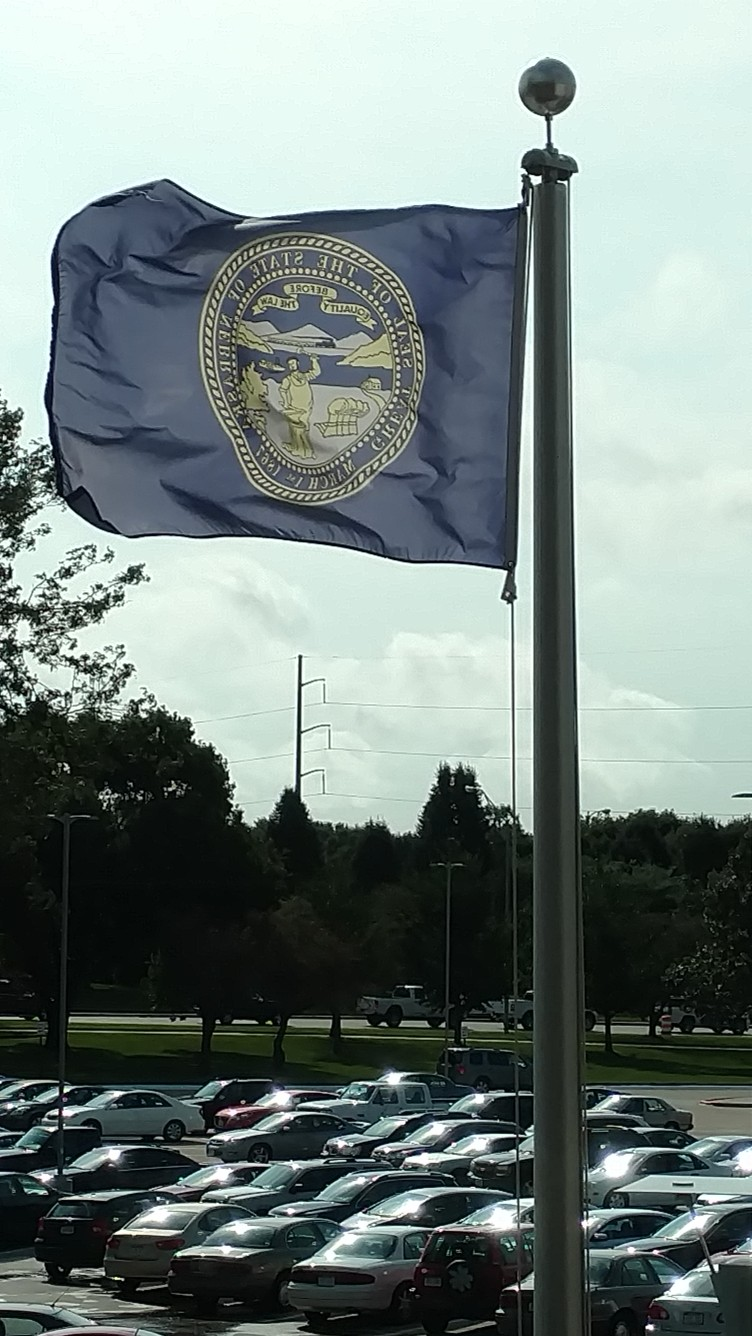
Flag of Nebraska as seen with the seal encompassing most of the flag and a pastel yellow coloring used

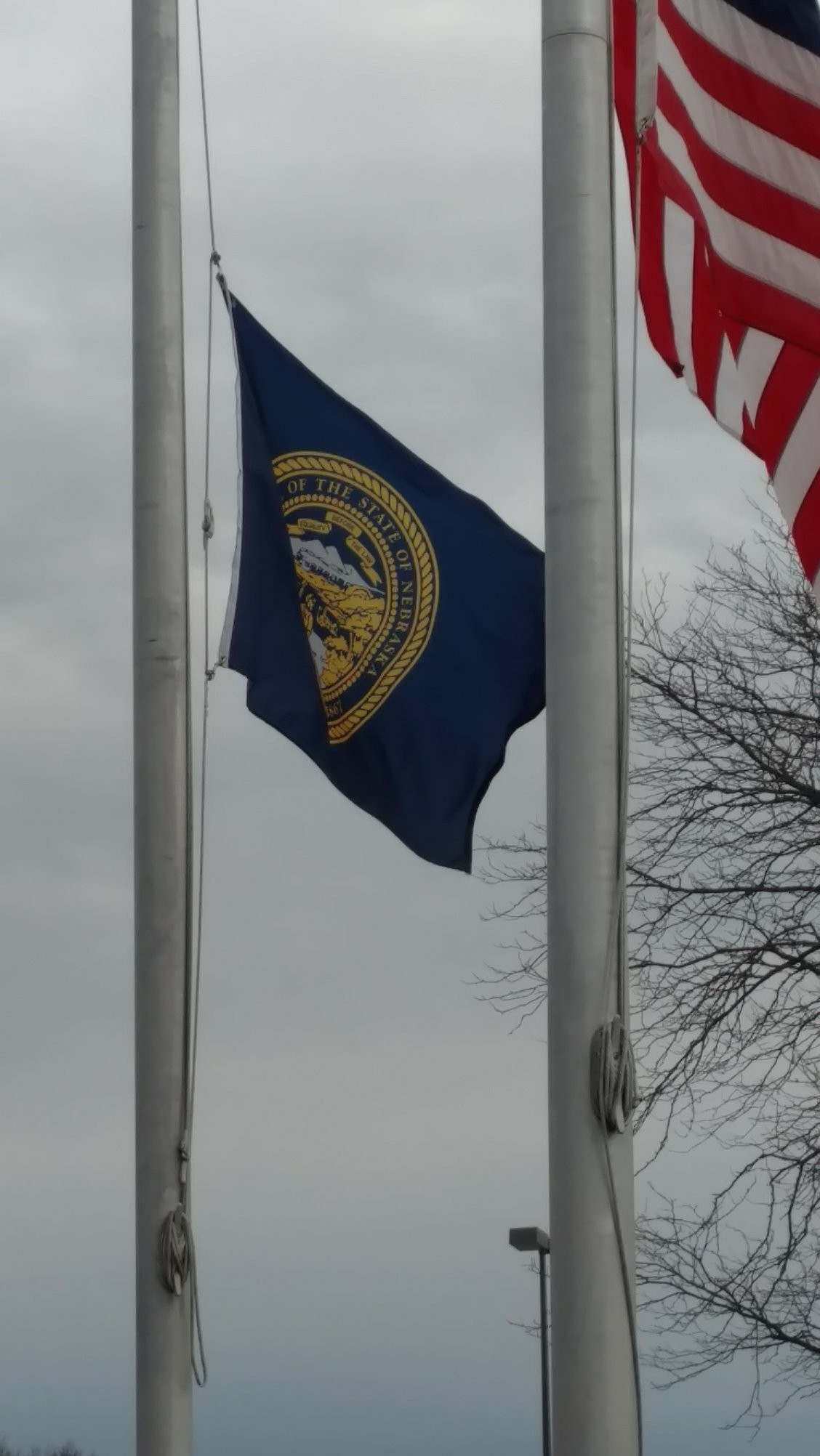
The flags of Nebraska and the United States at half-mast – note that the state flag is still lower than the national flag

== See also ==
- List of Nebraska state symbols
- Flags of the U.S. states and territories
