= Völkisch equality =

Nazi concept and legal practice

Völkisch equality is a concept within Nazism and a legal practice within Nazi Germany and its controlled territories during World War II, which ascribed racial equality of opportunity, equality before the law, and full legal rights to people of German blood or related blood, but deliberately excluded people outside this definition, who were regarded as inferior.

Nazism rejected the concept of the universal equality of human beings. Only those who qualified as Aryans were allowed full legal rights, including equality before the law. This type of equality was not an equality of people as holders of human rights but an equality of people as members of a master race, and thus individuals' interests were subordinate to the collective interest of the Volksgemeinschaft. The Nazis were opposed to the conventional universal conception of equality. They claimed to support Völkisch equality, but at the same time Nazism was committed to intensifying human inequality as a whole to allow the German people to become the "new master class" of the world. People outside of German blood were automatically considered unequal and inferior and thus denied the rights of those of German origin.

The Nazis advocated a welfare state for German citizens (able-bodied Germans of Aryan racial descent) as a means to eliminate social barriers between the German people. The Nazis provided equal access to education for talented children of workers and peasants. Hitler claimed that equality of opportunity for all racially sound German males was the meaning of the "socialism" of National Socialism.

The Nazis sought to dismantle what they deemed to be an unnatural hierarchy of the middle class and nobility who had allegedly jealously kept their wealth and titles while failing to justify their hierarchical position through their actions in World War I. Even nationalists among them were deemed by the Nazis to have not upheld an appropriate share of contribution to the war effort. Thus the Nazis claimed that only the primordial brutality and willpower of the lower orders could save Germany, and thus justified equality of opportunity as a means to create new capable leaders for German society, and to build a new, "natural" hierarchy based on merit.
