= Equality before the law =

Judicial principle

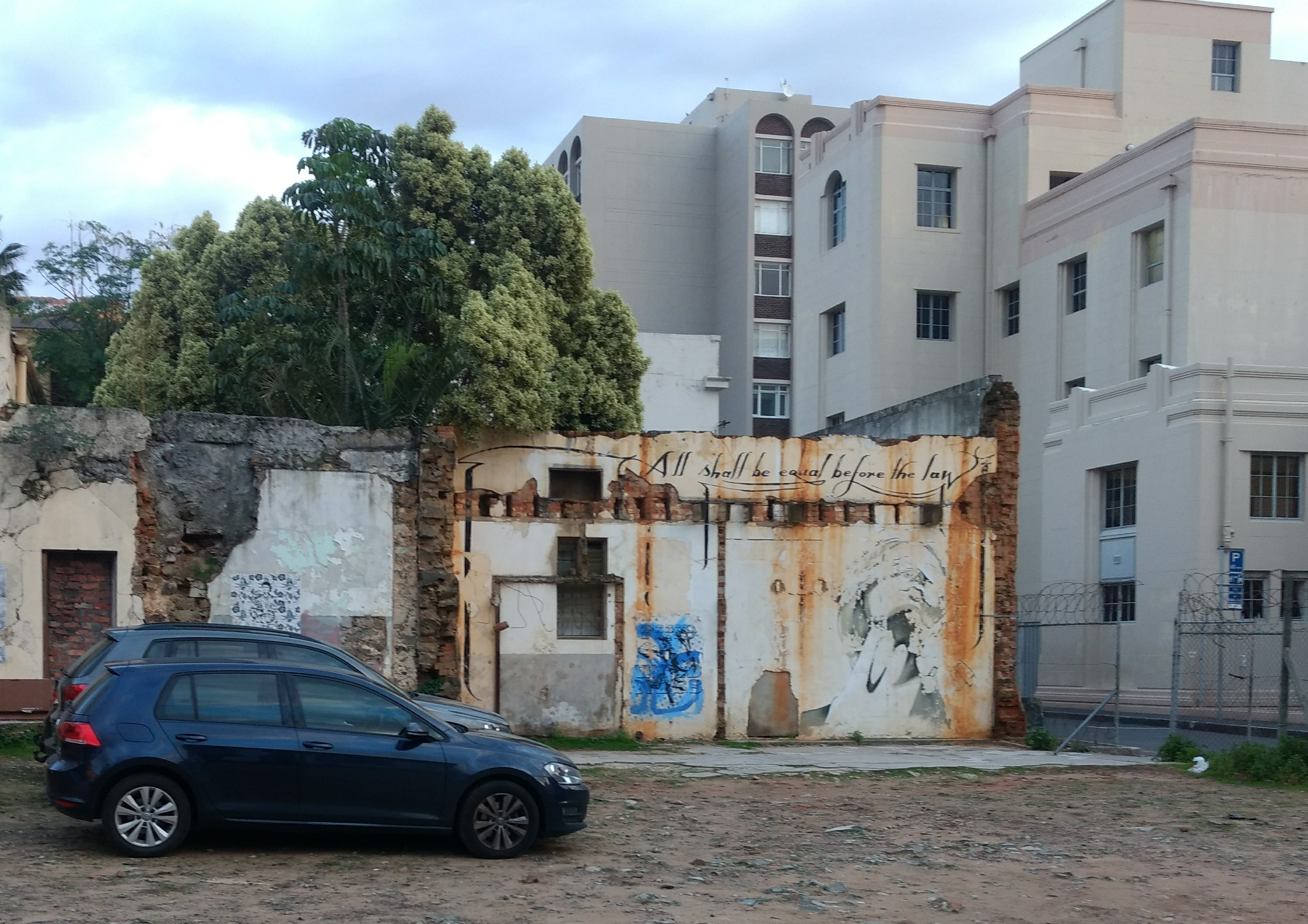
Graffiti in Cape Town, South Africa: "All shall be equal before the law."

Equality before the law, known as equality under the law, equality in the eyes of the law, legal equality, or legal egalitarianism, is the principle that all people must be equally protected by the law. The principle requires a systematic rule of law that observes due process to provide equal justice and requires equal protection ensuring that no individual nor group of individuals is privileged over others by the law. Also called the principle of isonomy, it arises from various philosophical questions concerning equality, fairness and justice. Equality before the law is one of the basic principles of some definitions of liberalism. The principle of equality before the law is incompatible with and does not exist within systems incorporating legal slavery, servitude, colonialism, oligarchy, aristocracy, or absolute monarchy.

Article 7 of the Universal Declaration of Human Rights (UDHR) states: "All are equal before the law and are entitled without any discrimination to equal protection of the law". Thus, it states that everyone must be treated equally under the law regardless of race, gender, color, ethnicity, religion, disability, or other characteristics, without privilege, discrimination or bias. The general guarantee of equality is provided by most of the world's national constitutions, but specific implementations of this guarantee vary. For example, while many constitutions guarantee equality regardless of race, only a few mention the right to equality regardless of nationality.

== History ==
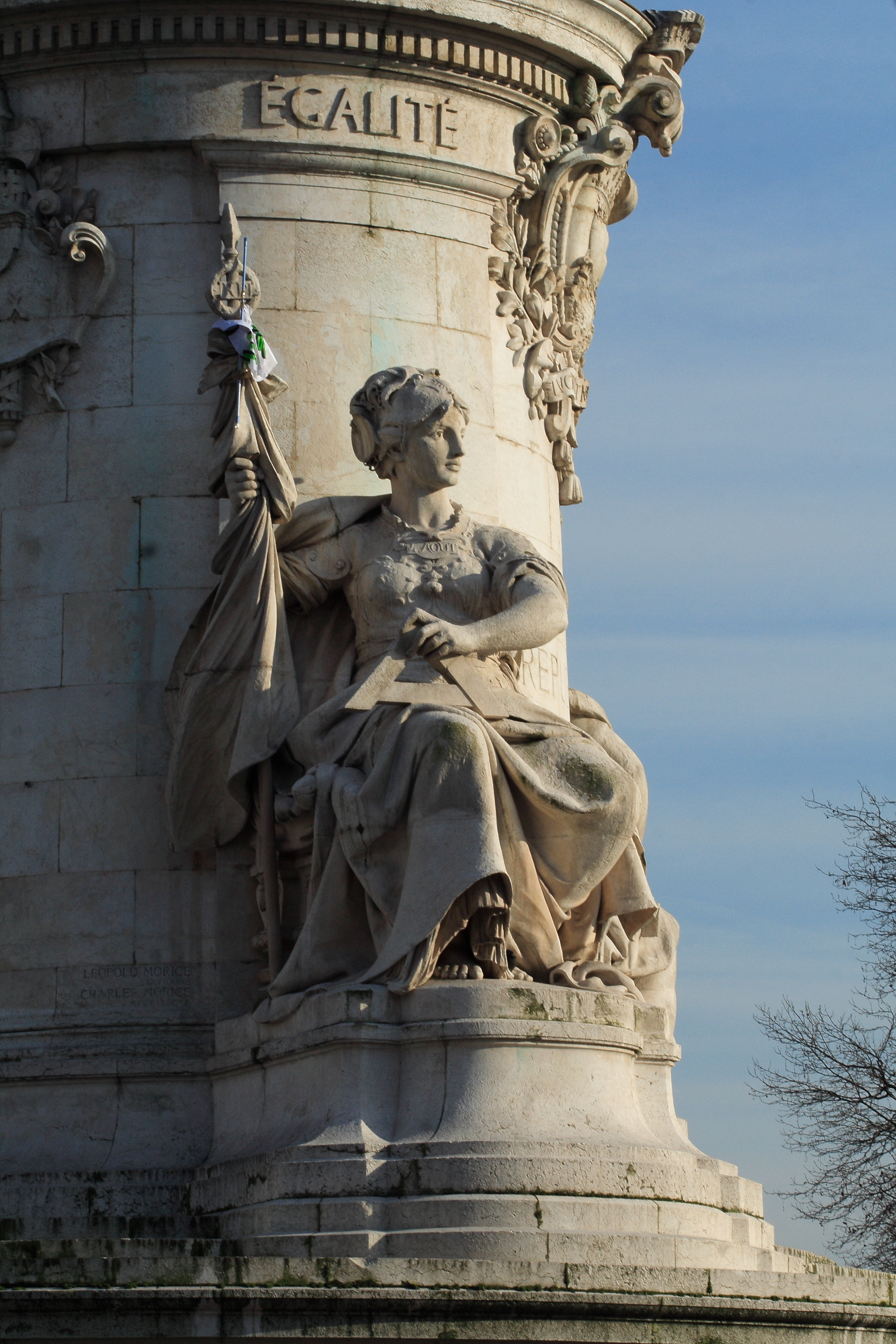
Statue of Equality in Paris as an allegory of equality

The legalist philosopher Guan Zhong (720–645 BC) declared that "the monarch and his subjects no matter how great and small they are complying with the law will be the great order".

The 431 BC funeral oration of Pericles, recorded in Thucydides's History of the Peloponnesian War, includes a passage praising the equality among the free male citizens of the Athenian democracy:

If we look to the laws, they afford equal justice to all in their private differences; if to social standing, advancement in public life falls to reputation for capacity, class considerations not being allowed to interfere with merit; nor again does poverty bar the way.

The Bible says that "You and the foreigner shall be the same before the Lord: The same laws and regulations will apply both to you and to the foreigner residing among you." (Numbers 15:15f)

The US state of Nebraska adopted the motto "Equality Before the Law" in 1867. It appears on both the state flag and the state seal. The motto was chosen to symbolize political and civil rights for Black people and women in Nebraska, particularly Nebraska's rejection of slavery and the fact that Black men in the state could legally vote since the beginning of statehood. Activists in Nebraska extend the motto to other groups, for example, to promote LGBT rights in Nebraska.

The fifth demand of the South African Freedom Charter, adopted in 1955, is "All Shall Be Equal Before The Law!"

Article 200 of the Criminal Code of Japan, the penalty regarding parricide, was declared unconstitutional for violating the equality under the law by the Supreme Court of Japan in 1973. This was a result of the trial of the Tochigi patricide case.

== Liberalism ==
Liberalism calls for equality before the law for all persons. Classical liberalism as embraced by libertarians and modern American conservatives opposes pursuing group rights at the expense of individual rights.

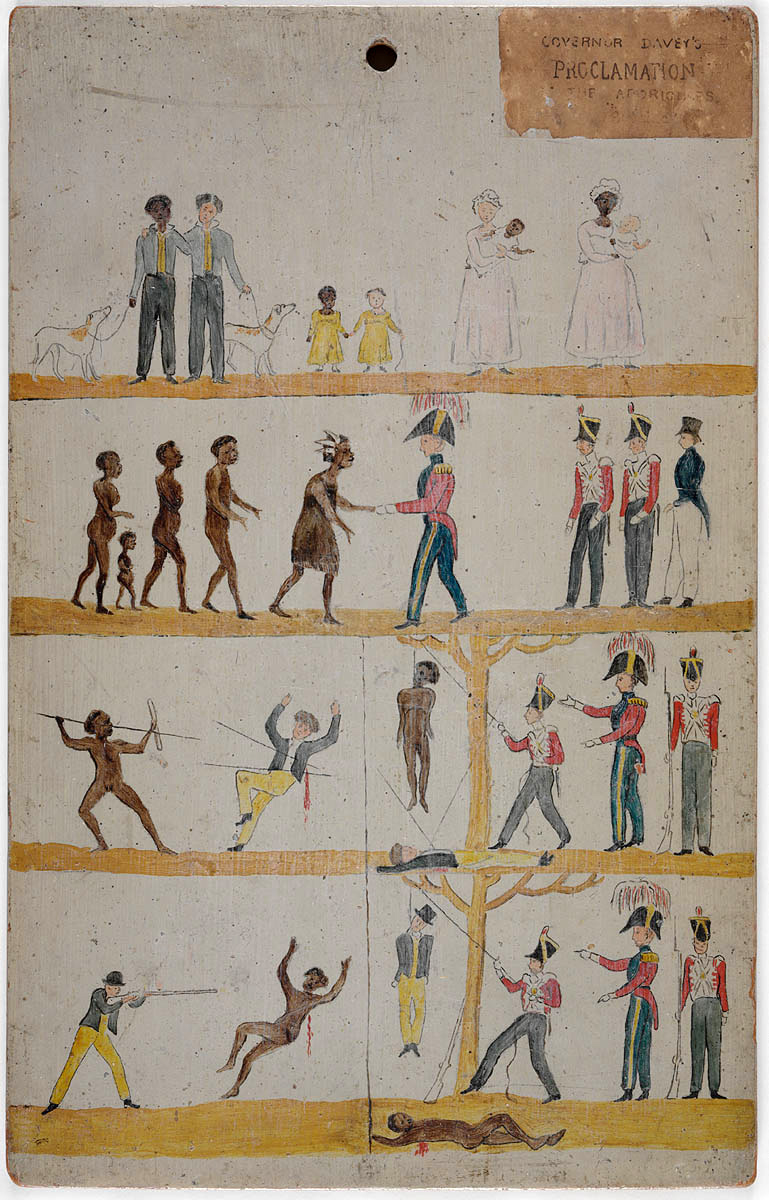
Proclamation by Sir George Arthur to Indigenous Tasmanians, purporting to show the equality of white and black before the law

In his Second Treatise of Government (1689), John Locke wrote: "A state also of equality, wherein all the power and jurisdiction is reciprocal, no one having more than another; there being nothing more evident, than that creatures of the same species and rank, promiscuously born to all the same advantages of nature, and the use of the same faculties, should also be equal one amongst another without subordination or subjection, unless the lord and master of them all should, by any manifest declaration of his will, set one above another, and confer on him, by an evident and clear appointment, an undoubted right to dominion and sovereignty."

In 1774, Alexander Hamilton wrote: "All men have one common original, they participate in one common nature, and consequently have one common right. No reason can be assigned why one man should exercise any power over his fellow creatures more than another, unless they voluntarily vest him with it".

In Social Statics, Herbert Spencer defined it as a natural law "that every man may claim the fullest liberty to exercise his faculties compatible with the possession of like liberty to every other man". Stated another way by Spencer, "each has freedom to do all that he wills provided that he infringes not the equal freedom of any other".

== Feminism ==
Equality before the law is a tenet of some branches of feminism. In the 19th century, gender equality before the law was a radical goal, but some later feminist views hold that formal legal equality is not enough to create actual and social equality between women and men. An ideal of formal equality may penalize women for failing to conform to a male norm while an ideal of different treatment may reinforce sexist stereotypes.

In Reed v. Reed, Justice Ruth Bader Ginsburg highlighted the evolving the nature of the phrase, "We, the People" in the U.S Constitution emphasizing how it has become more inclusive over time. She discussed the progression of women's roles in society, noting that women were fully recognized as citizens and gained the right to vote, which allowed them to be treated equally under the Fourteenth Amendment. Ginsburg's comments focus on the historical and legal advancements regarding gender equality without promoting a specific ideological stance.

In 1988, prior to serving as a Justice of the Supreme Court, Ruth Bader Ginsburg wrote: "Generalizations about the way women or men are – my life experience bears out – cannot guide me reliably in making decisions about particular individuals. At least in the law, I have found no natural superiority or deficiency in either sex. In class or in grading papers from 1963 to 1980, and now in reading briefs and listening to arguments in court for over seventeen years, I have detected no reliable indicator or distinctly male or surely female thinking – even penmanship". In an American Civil Liberties Union's Women's Rights Project in the 1970s, Ginsburg challenged in Frontiero v. Richardson the laws that gave health service benefits to wives of servicemen, but not to husbands of servicewomen. There are over 150 national constitutions that currently mention equality regardless of gender.

== See also ==
- Anti-discrimination law
- Civil and political rights
- Equal justice under law
- Equality of opportunity
- Global justice
- Isonomia
- Law of equal liberty
- Meritocracy
- Political egalitarianism
- Prerogative, the inverse of equality before the law
- Rule according to higher law
- Rule of law
- Selective enforcement
- Social equality
- List of civil rights leaders
- List of suffragists and suffragettes
- List of women's rights activists
- Völkisch equality
