= List of Nebraska state prisons =

This is a list of state prisons in Nebraska. There are no federal prisons in Nebraska and this list does not include county jails located in Nebraska.

- Community Corrections Center - Lincoln (operating capacity 680 inmates)
- Community Corrections Center - Omaha (capacity 180)
- Lincoln Correctional Center (capacity 500)
- Nebraska Correctional Center for Women
- Nebraska Correctional Youth Facility (capacity under 100)
- Nebraska Diagnostic and Evaluation Center
- Nebraska State Penitentiary
- Omaha Correctional Center (capacity 712)
- Tecumseh State Correctional Institution
- Work Ethic Camp (capacity 175)

Nebraska's Hastings Correctional Center was opened in 1987, served as a prison for United States Immigration and Customs Enforcement (ICE) from 2002 through 2005, and then was subsequently closed.

The state of Nebraska does not have private prisons. The state's Private Prison Contracting Act of 2001 spells out that any "private prison contractor shall not accept or house federal inmates or inmates from another state."
