= Nebraska State Patrol =

Law enforcement agency in Nebraska, USA

- Patch of Nebraska State Patrol
- Abbreviation: NSP
- Motto: Pro Bono Publico "for the good of the public"

Agency overview
- Formed: 1937; 89 years ago
- Employees: 685 (as of 2023)

Jurisdictional structure
- Operations jurisdiction: Nebraska, U.S.
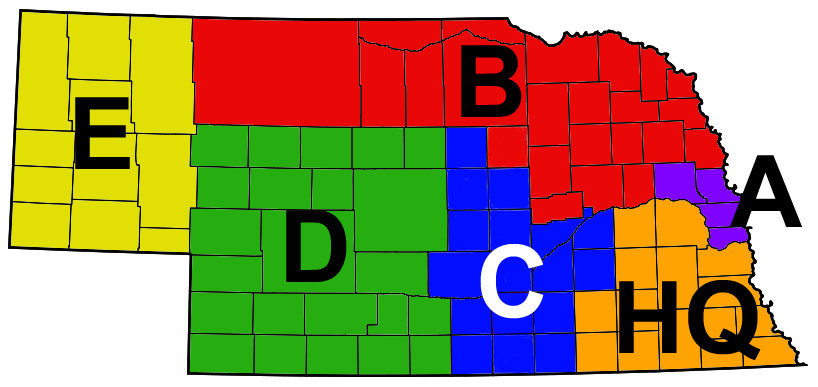
- Nebraska State Patrol Troops
- Area: 77,421 square miles (200,520 km^{2})
- Population: 1,774,571 (2007 est.)
- General nature: Civilian police

Operational structure
- Headquarters: Lincoln, Nebraska
- Troopers: 482 (authorised, as of 2023)
- Civilians: 241 (as of 2014)
- Agency executive: Colonel Bryan Waugh, Superintendent
- Troops: 6

Website
- Official website

The Nebraska State Patrol is Nebraska's only statewide full-service law enforcement agency. Serving Nebraska since 1937, State Patrol troopers perform a wide variety of duties. Those include working with communities to improve public safety, enforcing traffic laws and drug laws, investigating crimes, and enforcing the laws and regulations pertaining to motor carriers.

The current NSP Superintendent is Colonel Bryan Waugh.

NSP is divided into six districts including:

- Headquarters in Lincoln
- Troop A in Omaha
- Troop B in Norfolk
- Troop C in Grand Island
- Troop D in North Platte
- Troop E in Scottsbluff

== Divisions ==
NSP has several divisions which operate within the department, they include:

- The Aviation Support Division which consists of a Bell 407 helicopter, a Bell 505 helicopter, two Turbo Cessna T206H's equipped with FLIR and downlink capabilities, and a Piper Super Cub used for traffic enforcement, observation and surveillance. The Aviation Support Division is used for many different functions including: Drug raids, presidential security, rescue missions, investigative photography, transportation, surveillance, and traffic enforcement.
- The State Capitol Security Division is responsible for the daily security needs of the "Capitol Complex Area". The State Capitol is equipped with over 60 cameras that are recorded using a "Digital Video Recorder" which allows them to store video images and print out still images.
- The Carrier Enforcement division operates permanent truck scales throughout the state, conducts carrier inspections and is in charge of monitoring commercial motor vehicle accidents.
- Communications - Statewide, 50 Communications Specialists staff the six communications centers located in Omaha, Lincoln, Norfolk, Grand Island, North Platte and Scottsbluff.
- Community Policing
- Executive Protection
- Internal Affairs
- Investigative Services
- The K-9 Division consists of 15 troopers and their police service dogs. Each dog costs about $3,500-$5,000. The division relies heavily on public support. The dogs are purchased by the Nebraska State Patrol Foundation using donations from the public.
- Legal
- Supply and Radio Engineering
- The Traffic Enforcement division makes up about 200 troopers which are responsible for over 10,000 miles (16,000 km) of roads in Nebraska.
- The Training Academy conducts both the Basic Recruit Camp and in service training.

== Training academy ==
NSP runs their own 24-week in-resident training academy in lieu of sending recruits through the standard Nebraska Law Enforcement Training Center's 13-week course.

The new Nebraska State Patrol Training Academy is co-located with the Nebraska Law Enforcement Training Center in Grand Island, Nebraska. The collocation of agencies upgraded the facilities for virtually every officer completing law enforcement certification in the State of Nebraska. The Training Academy includes: barracks to house up to 208 officers, modern classrooms, a defensive tactics room, a fitness room, a training tank, a gymnasium, a recreation area, 2 ranges (1 static shooting, 1 combat), an inspection bay and training room for commercial vehicle inspections, a police service dog training grounds/boarding area, a driving range, and a cafeteria.

The State Patrol's style of instruction balances a para-military environment with an academic environment. The curriculum includes instruction in officer survival, investigations, patrolling, legal, administrative, tactical, human understanding, traffic (motor vehicle laws), and carrier enforcement.

The Training Academy staff is well-versed in educational theories such as state-to-state training and adult learning guidelines. The recruits undergo nearly one thousand hours of instruction during camp. The challenge is to ensure they are absorbing and retaining the information. In accordance with the adult learning theory, classes run into the evening rather than starting too early in the morning and much of the instruction involves hands-on and scenario-based training. State-to-state training means the staff tries to present the instruction in the same conditions and environments the recruits will actually experience on the street.

== Weapons ==
- Glock Model 21SF .45 ACP (being replaced by Glock Model 45 Gen 5 9mm)
- Smith & Wesson M&P15 5.56×45mm NATO
- Colt M4 Carbine 5.56×45mm NATO
- CAR-15 "Commando" XM177 5.56×45mm NATO
- Remington 870 12 gauge

Prior to the Glock Model 21SF, troopers carried other Glock Model pistols one of which was the Glock Model 22 .40 S&W which had the Nebraska State Patrol logo and "NSP" etched into the slide of the pistol. The NSP authorized various Glock Models over the years including the Glock Model 20 10mm which featured the NSP logo engraved in the slide.

The Nebraska State Patrol utilizes numerous AR-15 styled rifles for patrol as well as for the tactical team. Some patrol rifles feature the EOTech Holographic Sight equipped on the rifle and have spare magazines attached to the rifle.

Currently the agency is training new recruits with the Glock Model 45 9mm handgun. The Glock Model 45 has the grip and capacity of a Glock 17 but has the slide of a Glock 19. The current troopers will transition to the new 9mm handguns from their current Glock 21SF .45 caliber sidearms, which are 9 years old.

== Vehicle fleet ==
- Dodge Charger
- Ford Expedition
- Ford Crown Victoria
- Ford Explorer
- Chevrolet Suburban
- Ford F-350
- Ford Taurus

== Fallen officers ==
Since the creation of the Nebraska State Patrol, 13 officers have died in the line of duty.

== See also ==
- List of law enforcement agencies in Nebraska
- State police
- State patrol
- Highway patrol
