= Nebraska Religious Coalition for Science Education =

The Nebraska Religious Coalition for Science Education (NRCSE) was founded in April 25, 2001 by four individuals meeting at First Central Congregational Church in Omaha. The NRCSE refers to its members as "Nebraskans of various religious faiths who respect both science and theology". The NRCSE's stated mission is to "proclaim the compatibility of good science (including evolution) and good theology (including creation)", and that "evolution can and should be widely taught in a scientifically sound manner that is neutral regarding philosophical or religious worldviews".

The NRCSE takes the following positions:

1. Evolution is a viable scientific theory.
2. A Creator is a viable theological proposition.
3. Creationism or "creation science," as well as intelligent design theory, lack evidence and represent erroneous deviations from the scientific method.
4. Nebraska's schools have a duty to help students understand the best available science, including the biological theory of evolution.
5. Academic freedom, religious freedom, and scientific integrity are compatible.
