= USS Nebraska =

USS Nebraska may refer to:

- USS Nebraska (1869) was the name given to the never commissioned Kalamazoo-class monitor Shakamaxon in 1869
- USS Nebraska (BB-14) was a Virginia-class battleship launched in 1904 and sold for scrap in 1922
- USS Nebraska (SSBN-739) is an Ohio-class submarine launched in 1992 and currently on active duty

== See also ==
- SS Cornhusker State (T-ACS-6), an auxiliary Gopher State-class crane ship launched in 1968 currently in ready reserve since 1993.
