= Seal of Nebraska =

Official government emblem of the U.S. state of Nebraska

Great Seal of the State of Nebraska
- Armiger: State of Nebraska
- Adopted: 1867
- Motto: Equality Before the Law

The Great Seal of the State of Nebraska was adopted by the Nebraska legislature on June 15, 1867. It depicts a blacksmith working at an anvil along with various other symbols related to Nebraska during the early days of its statehood.

== Description ==
The 1867 legislative act that established the seal describes it in these words:

The eastern part of the circle to be represented by a steamboat ascending the Missouri river; the mechanic arts to be represented by a smith with hammer and anvil; in the foreground, agriculture to be represented by a settler's cabin, sheaves of wheat and stalks of growing corn; in the background a train of cars heading towards the Rocky Mountains, and on the extreme west, the Rocky Mountains to be plainly in view; around the top of this circle to be in capital letters, the motto. 'EQUALITY BEFORE THE LAW,' and the circle to be surrounded with the words, 'Great Seal of the State of Nebraska, March 1st, 1867.'

== History ==
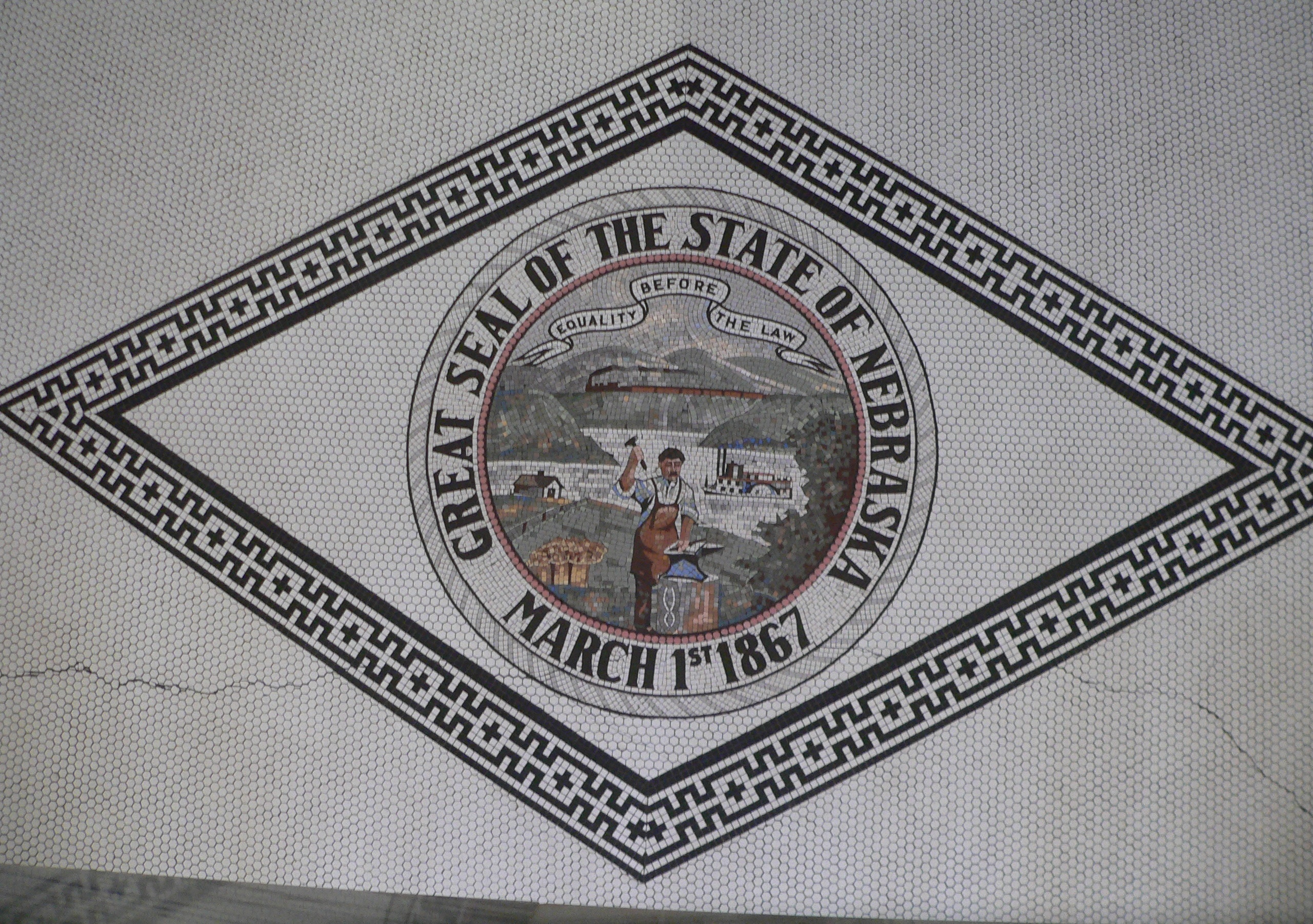
The seal in a 1916 mosaic on the floor of the Burt County, Nebraska courthouse

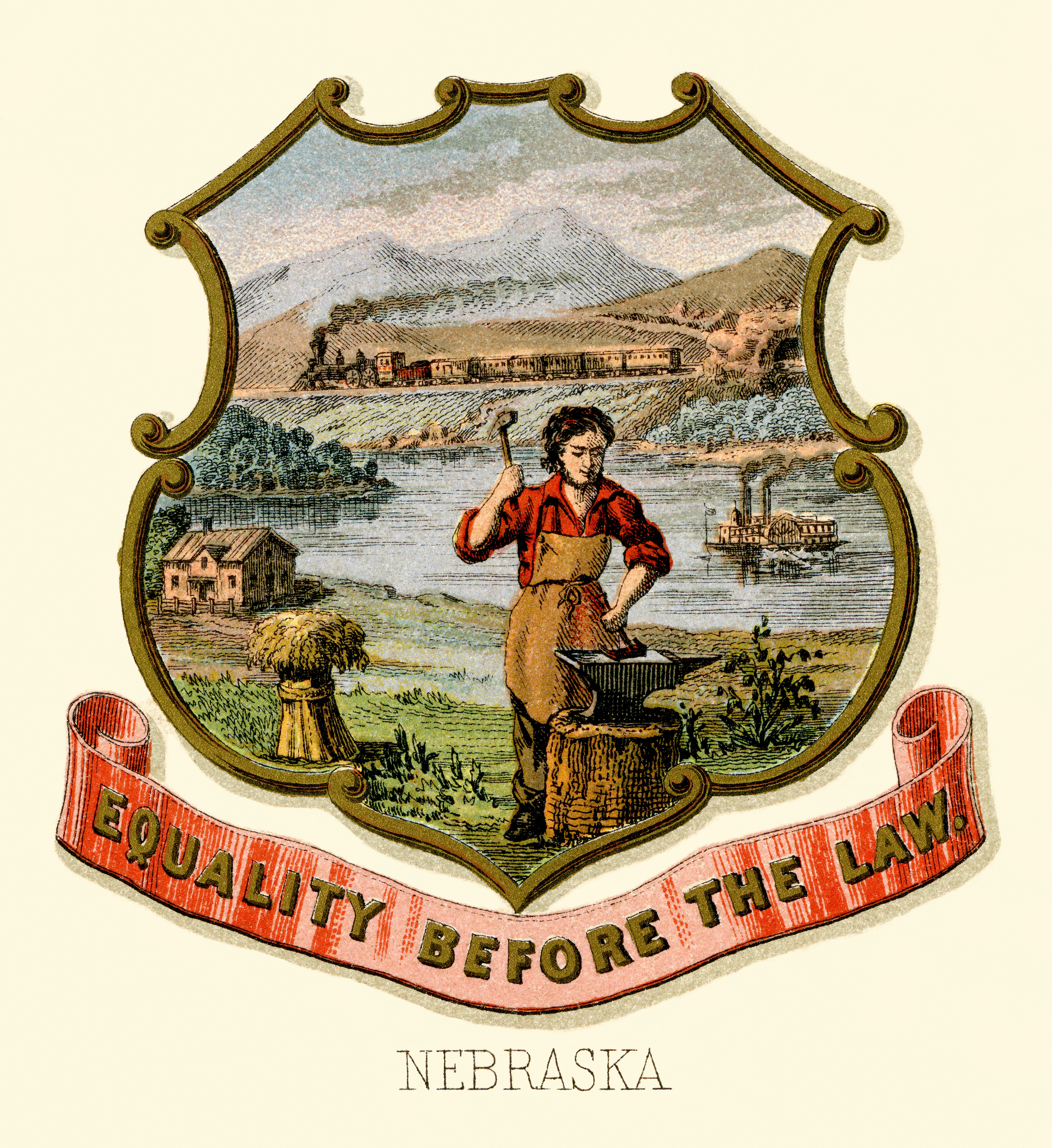
Nebraska state historical coat of arms (illustrated, 1876)

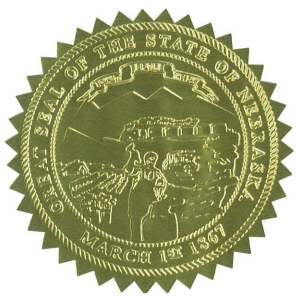
Seal of the State of Nebraska, Embossed (2025)

Legislation describing the seal and requiring the secretary of state to procure an instrument to stamp the seal was passed in 1867, with $25 appropriated for the purchase. A cast-iron press in the shape of a lion's head was purchased to imprint the seal. The identity of the artist who designed and engraved the seal is unknown. It may have been a jeweler in Omaha.

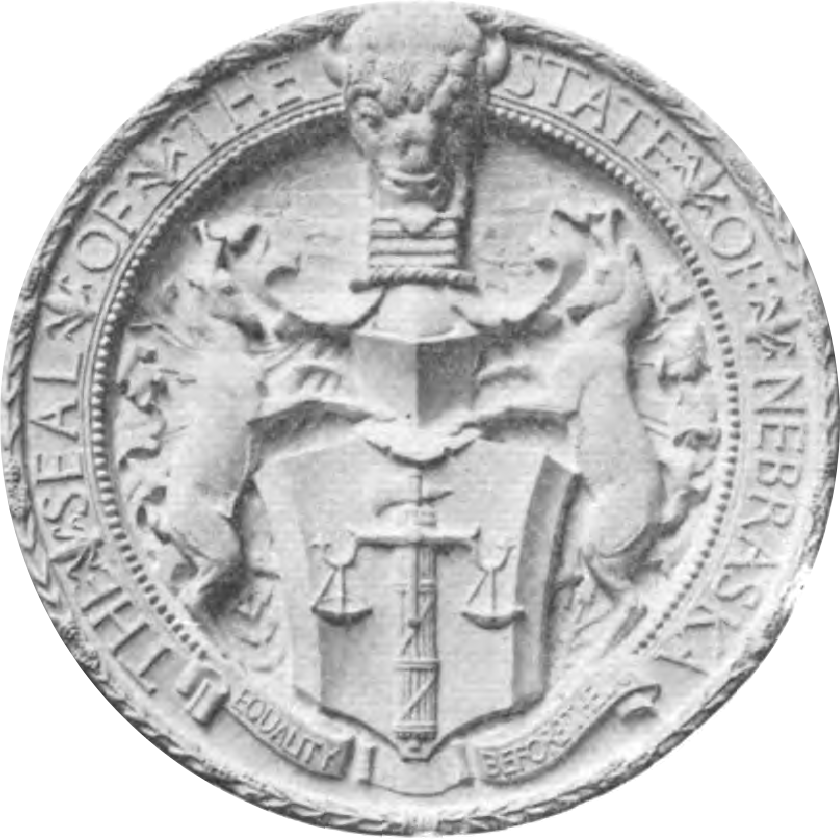
Proposed state seal of Nebraska by Bertram Grosvenor Goodhue, 1921

In 1921, following the introduction and passing of a bill proposing the creation of a commission to redesign the state seal in the Nebraska legislature, a design by Bertram Goodhue, the architect of the Nebraska State Capitol was selected as the official proposal of the commission. The design, placed within a circular frame bearing the words “The Seal of the State of Nebraska,” was a heraldic achievement. Its crest featured a buffalo head atop three stacked bound books on a torse and knight’s mantled helmet. The supporters were two antelopes, and the shield displayed a pair of scales over a fasces with an axe—clearly referencing the state's motto, "Equality before the law", which also appeared inscribed on a scroll below the shield. When SF 267 was introduced in 1923, time ran out and the bill died, leaving the original 1867 seal in place. The seal was put on the Flag of Nebraska in 1963. Yet, Goodhue's design found its way into use, carved into the pylons flanking the north entrance of the state capitol, as a carving in the Law Library, in the legislature's seal, above the speaker's desk in the Warner Memorial Chamber, and above the bench in the State Supreme Court chamber, where it remains to this day.

The lion's head press was used for official business for 138 years, when it was retired by Secretary of State John A. Gale because it was in danger of breaking. It was replaced by a toggle-hand press.

== Criticism ==
The Nebraska State Journal gently criticized the design in 1921, finding the 1867 seal "archaic in conception and mediocre in drawing" though still interesting and nostalgic. The newspaper noted that "the Rocky Mountains never belonged in the picture" because they are not located in Nebraska.

One hundred years later (in 2021) the newspaper renewed its criticism, adding that because the seal depicts the Missouri River (which forms the border of Nebraska) some of the land shown on the seal is located in Iowa.

== See also ==
- List of Nebraska state symbols
- Flag of Nebraska
