= List of Nebraska state symbols =

Location of the state of Nebraska in the United States of America

The following is a list of official symbols of the U.S. state of Nebraska, listed in the order adopted by the Nebraska Legislature:

== State symbols ==
Type	Symbol	Year	Image
Flag	A blue background with the seal of Nebraska superimposed on the center.	1925	Nebraska flag
Motto	Equality Before the Law	1867	
Nickname	Cornhusker State	1945	
Seal	The Great Seal of the State of Nebraska	1867	Nebraska State Seal
Flower	Goldenrod (Solidago gigantea)	1895	Goldenrod
Poet laureate	John Neihardt	1921	
Bird	Western meadowlark (Sturnella neglecta)	1929	Western meadowlark
Symbol	A covered wagon pulled by a pair of oxen.	1963	The official symbol and slogan for the State of Nebraska.
Slogan	"Welcome to NEBRASKAland where the West begins"	1963	The official symbol and slogan for the State of Nebraska.
Fossil	Mammoth	1967	Mammoth
Gemstone	Blue agate	1967	Blue agate
Rock	Prairie agate	1967	
Song	"Beautiful Nebraska"	1967	
Grass	Little bluestem (Schizachyrium scoparium)	1969	Little bluestem
Tree	Cottonwood (Populus deltoides)	1972	Eastern cottonwood
Insect	Honeybee (Apis mellifera)	1975	Western honey bee
Soil	Holdrege series	1979	
Mammal	White-tailed deer (Odocoileus virginianus)	1981	White-tailed deer
Poet laureate	William Kloefkorn	1982	
Fish	Channel catfish (Ictalurus punctatus)	1997-09-13	Channel catfish
American folk dance	Square dance	1997-09-19	
Ballad	"A Place Like Nebraska"	1997-10-09	
Baseball capital	St. Paul (historic); Wakefield	1997-10-09	
Village of lights	Cody	1997-12-11	
River	Platte River	1998-02-26	
Soft drink	Kool-Aid	1998-05-21	
Beverage	Milk	1998-09-10	Milk
Reptile	Ornate Box Turtle	2022	Ornate Box Turtle

== See also ==
- List of Nebraska-related topics
- Lists of United States state insignia
- State of Nebraska
