= List of law enforcement agencies in Nebraska =

This is a list of law enforcement agencies in the state of Nebraska.

According to the U.S. Bureau of Justice Statistics' 2008 Census of State and Local Law Enforcement Agencies, the state had 225 law enforcement agencies employing 3,765 sworn officers, about 211 for each 100,000 residents.

== State agencies ==
- Nebraska Brand Committee
- Nebraska Department of Agriculture — responsible for enforcement of the Nebraska Pesticide Act
- Nebraska Department of Insurance - Insurance Fraud Prevention Division
- Nebraska Department of Motor Vehicles, Driver & Vehicle Records Division, Fraud Investigation Section - "performs investigative work relating to vehicle title and registration fraud, driver's license fraud, and odometer fraud. Motor Vehicle Fraud Investigators are certified Nebraska Law Enforcement Officers commissioned as Deputy State Sheriffs."
- Nebraska Department of Revenue
- Nebraska Emergency Management Agency - Homeland Security
- Nebraska Game and Parks Commission - conservation officers enforce Nebraska wildlife laws
- Nebraska Law Enforcement Training Center
- Nebraska Public Service Commission - Transportation Investigators
- Nebraska State Fire Marshal
- Nebraska State Patrol
- Nebraska State Racing Commission
- University of Nebraska at Kearney Police Department
- University of Nebraska–Lincoln Police Department
- University of Nebraska Omaha Police Department

== County agencies ==
- Adams County Sheriff's Department
- Antelope County Sheriff's Office
- Arthur County Sheriff's Office
- Banner County Sheriff's Office
- Blaine County Sheriff's Office
- Boone County Sheriff's Office
- Box Butte County Sheriff's Office
- Boyd County Sheriff's Office
- Brown County Sheriff's Office
- Buffalo County Sheriff's Office
- Burt County Sheriff's Office
- Butler County Sheriff's Office
- Cass County Sheriff's Office
- Cedar County Sheriff's Office
- Chase County Sheriff's Office
- Cherry County Sheriff's Office
- Cheyenne County Sheriff's Office
- Clay County Sheriff's Office
- Colfax County Sheriff's Office
- Cuming County Sheriff's Office
- Custer County Sheriff's Office
- Dakota County Sheriff's Office
- Dawes County Sheriff's Office
- Dawson County Sheriff's Office
- Deuel County Sheriff's Office
- Dixon County Sheriff's Office
- Dodge County Sheriff's Office
- Douglas County Sheriff's Office
- Dundy County Sheriff's Office
- Fillmore County Sheriff's Office
- Franklin County Sheriff's Office
- Frontier County Sheriff's Office
- Furnas County Sheriff's Office
- Gage County Sheriff's Office
- Garden County Sheriff's Office
- Garfield County Sheriff's Office
- Gosper County Sheriff's Office
- Grant County Sheriff's Office
- Greeley County Sheriff's Office
- Hall County Sheriff's Office
- Hamilton County Sheriff's Office
- Harlan County Sheriff's Office
- Hayes County Sheriff's Office
- Hitchcock County Sheriff's Office
- Holt County Sheriff's Office
- Hooker County Sheriff's Office
- Howard County Sheriff's Office
- Jefferson County Sheriff's Office
- Johnson County Sheriff's Office
- Kearney County Sheriff's Office
- Keith County Sheriff's Office
- Keya Paha County Sheriff's Office
- Kimball County Sheriff's Office
- Knox County Sheriff's Office
- Lancaster County Sheriff's Office
- Lincoln County Sheriff's Office
- Logan County Sheriff's Office
- Loup County Sheriff's Office
- Madison County Sheriff's Office
- McPherson County Sheriff's Office
- Merrick County Sheriff's Office
- Morrill County Sheriff's Office
- Nance County Sheriff's Office
- Nemaha County Sheriff's Office
- Nuckolls County Sheriff's Office
- Otoe County Sheriff's Office
- Pawnee County Sheriff's Office
- Perkins County Sheriff's Office
- Phelps County Sheriff's Office
- Pierce County Sheriff's Office
- Platte County Sheriff's Office
- Polk County Sheriff's Office
- Red Willow County Sheriff's Office
- Richardson County Sheriff's Office
- Rock County Sheriff's Office
- Saline County Sheriff's Office
- Sarpy County Sheriff's Department
- Saunders County Sheriff's Office
- Scotts Bluff County Sheriff's Office
- Seward County Sheriff's Office
- Sheridan County Sheriff's Office
- Sherman County Sheriff's Office
- Sioux County Sheriff's Office
- Stanton County Sheriff's Office
- Thayer County Sheriff's Office
- Thomas County Sheriff's Office
- Thurston County Sheriff's Office
- Valley County Sheriff's Office
- Washington County Sheriff's Office
- Wayne County Sheriff's Office
- Webster County Sheriff's Office
- Wheeler County Sheriff's Office
- York County Sheriff's Office

== Municipal agencies ==
- Albion Police Department
- Alliance Police Department
- Ansley Police Department
- Ashland Police Department
- Atkinson Police Department
- Auburn Police Department
- Aurora Police Department
- Bancroft Police Department
- Battle Creek Police Department
- Bayard Police Department
- Beatrice Police Department
- Beemer Police Department
- Bellevue Police Department
- Bennington Police Department
- Blair Police Department
- Bloomfield Police Department
- Boys Town Police Department
- Bridgeport Police Department
- Broken Bow Police Department
- Burwell Police Department
- Callaway Police Department
- Cedar Bluffs Police Department
- Ceresco Police Department
- Chadron Police Department
- Clarks Police Department
- Coleridge Police Department
- Columbus Police Department
- Cozad Police Department
- Crawford Police Department
- Creighton Police Department
- Crete Police Department
- Crofton Police Department
- David City Police Department
- Decatur Police Department
- Dodge Police Department
- Elgin Police Department
- Emerson Police Department
- Exeter Police Department
- Fairbury Police Department
- Fairmont Police Department
- Falls City Police Department
- Franklin Police Department
- Fremont Police Department
- Friend Police Department
- Gering Police Department
- Gordon Police Department
- Gothenburg Police Department
- Grand Island Police Department
- Hartington Police Department
- Harvard Police Department
- Hastings Police Department
- Hemingford Police Department
- Henderson Police Department
- Hildreth Police Department
- Holdrege Police Department
- Hooper Police Department
- Howells Police Department
- Humphrey Police Department
- Imperial Police Department
- Kearney Police Department
- Kimball Police Department
- La Vista Police Department
- Laurel Police Department
- Leigh Police Department
- Lexington Police Department
- Lincoln Police Department
- Loomis Police Department
- Lyman Police Department
- Lyons Police Department
- Macy Police Department
- Madison Police Department
- McCook Police Department
- Mead Police Department
- Milford Police Department
- Minatare Police Department
- Minden Police Department
- Mitchell Police Department
- Morrill Police Department
- Nebraska City Police Department
- Neligh Police Department
- Newcastle Police Department
- Newman Grove Police Department
- Niobrara Police Department
- Norfolk Police Department
- North Platte Police Department
- Oakland Police Department
- Ogallala Police Department
- Omaha Police Department
- O'Neill Police Department
- Ord Police Department
- Osmond Police Department
- Papillion Police Department
- Pierce Police Department
- Plainview Police Department
- Plattsmouth Police Department
- Ponca Police Department
- Ralston Police Department
- Randolph Police Department
- Ravenna Police Department
- Saint Edward Police Department
- Saint Paul Police Department
- Sargent Police Department
- Schuyler Police Department
- Scottsbluff Police Department
- Scribner Police Department
- Seward Police Department
- Shelton Police Department
- Sidney Police Department
- Silver Creek Police Department
- South Sioux City Police Department
- Spalding Police Department
- Superior Police Department
- Sutton Police Department
- Tecumseh Police Department
- Tekamah Police Department
- Tilden Police Department
- Uehling Police Department
- Valentine Police Department
- Valley Police Department
- Verdigre Police Department
- Wahoo Police Department
- Walthill Police Department
- Waterloo Police Department
- Wauneta Police Department
- Wausa Police Department
- Wayne Police Department
- Weeping Water Police Department
- West Point Police Department
- Wilbur Police Department
- Winnebago Police Department
- Wisner Police Department
- Wymore Police Department
- York Police Department
- Yutan Police Department

== Tribal agencies ==
- Omaha Nation Police Department
- Santee Sioux Nation Police Department
- Iowa Tribal Police Department

== Other law enforcement agencies ==
- Office of the United States Marshal for the District of Nebraska
- Federal Bureau of Investigation, Omaha
- Federal Protective Services
- Immigration and Naturalization Services
- Federal Reserve Police
- United States Department of Veterans Affairs Police
- Department of the Air Force Police
- Omaha Airport Police Department
- Union Pacific Police Department
- BNSF Police Department
- Lincoln Airport Authority Police Department
- Metropolitan Community College Police
- University of Nebraska–Lincoln Campus Police
- University of Nebraska Omaha Campus Police
- University of Nebraska at Kearney Campus Police
- University of Nebraska Medical Center Campus Police

== Sources ==
- Nebraska Criminal Justice Directory - April 2010 edition
