= Climate change in Nebraska =

Climate change in the US state of Nebraska

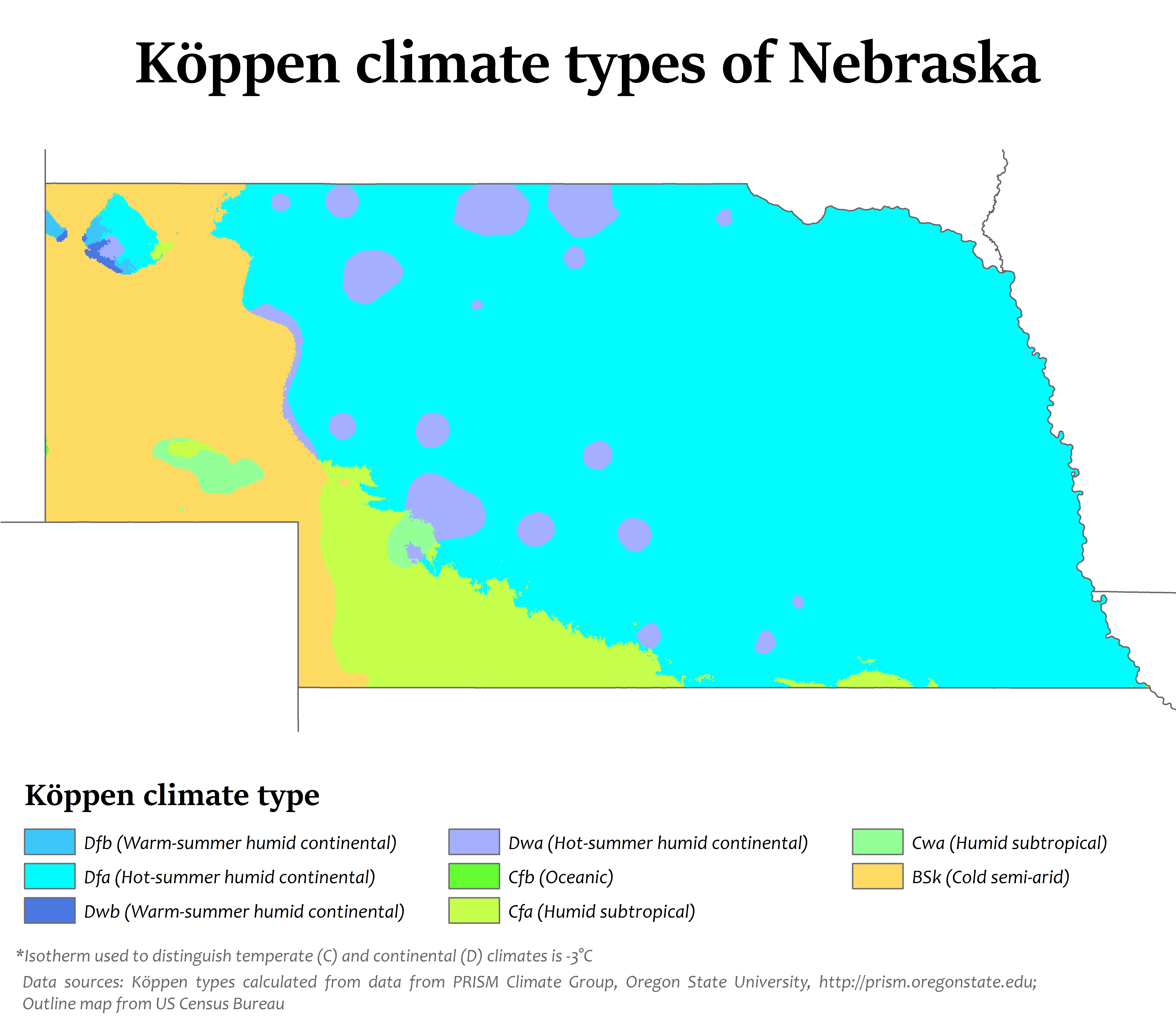
Köppen climate types in Nebraska, showing that the climate of the state is now primarily hot-summer humid continental.

Climate change in Nebraska encompasses the effects of climate change, attributed to man-made increases in atmospheric carbon dioxide, in the U.S. state of Nebraska.

The University of Nebraska–Lincoln (UNL) reported that "climate change poses significant risks to Nebraska's economy, environment and citizens". This view is expanded upon by the United States Environmental Protection Agency:

"Nebraska's climate is changing. In the past century, most of the state has warmed by at least one degree (F). The soil is becoming drier, and rainstorms are becoming more intense. In the coming decades, flooding is likely to increase, yet summers are likely to become increasingly hot and dry, which would reduce yields of some crops, require farmers to use more water, and amplify some risks to human health". The UNL report similarly identifies the main concerns for climate change in Nebraska as "increases in temperatures and the number of flooding and drought incidents".

The 2019 Midwestern U.S. floods left extensive damage in the state.

== Precipitation and water resources ==
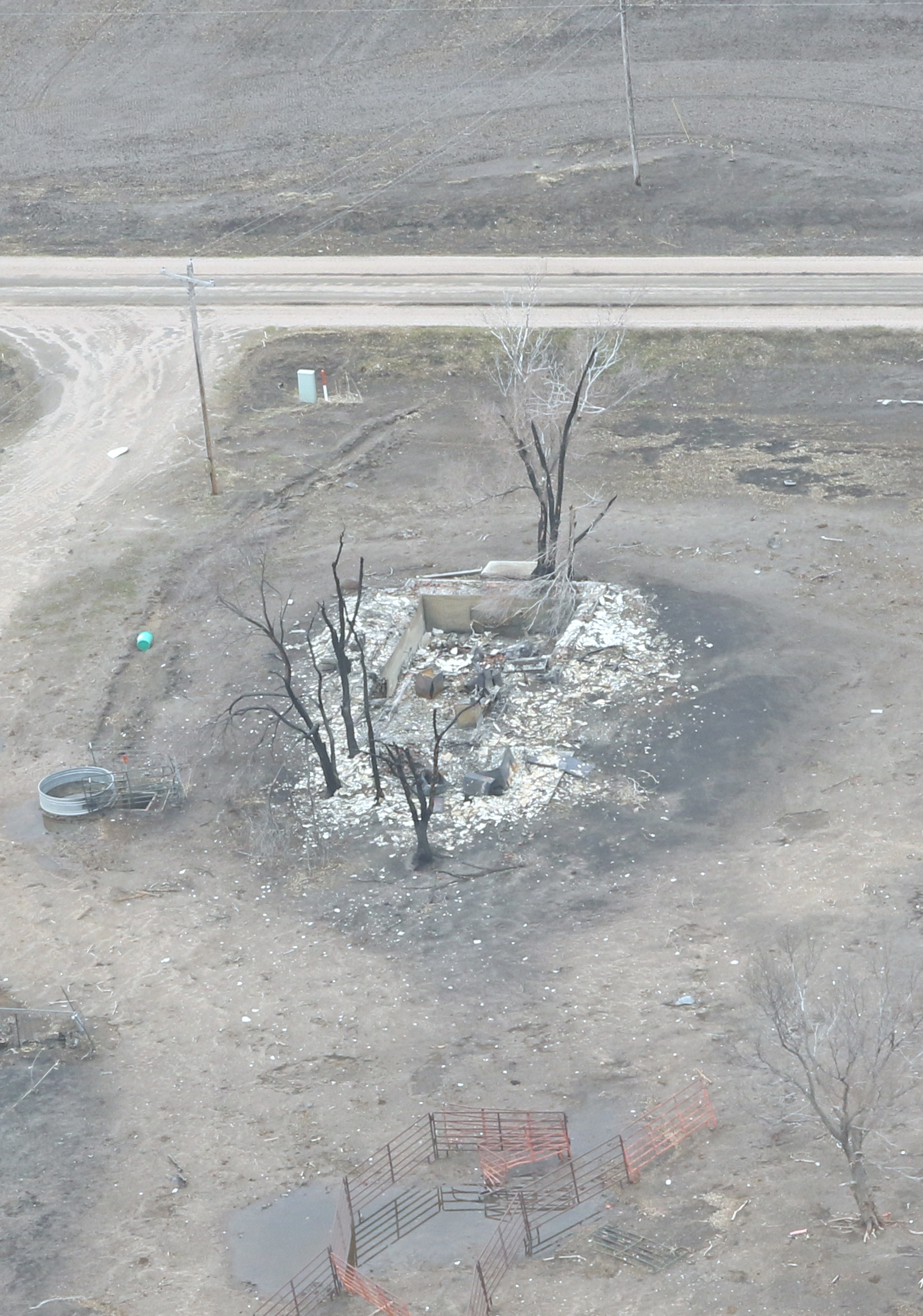
Farmstead burned down by a wildfire near Cambridge, May 2022

"Changing the climate is likely to increase the demand for water but make it less available. Soils will probably continue to become drier, because warmer temperatures increase evaporation and water use by plants, and average rainfall during summer is likely to decrease. More evaporation and less rainfall would reduce the average flow of rivers and streams. Decreased river flows can create problems for navigation, recreation, public water supplies, and electric power generation. Commercial navigation can be suspended during droughts (or floods) when there is too little water to keep channels deep enough for barge traffic. Decreased river flows can also lower the water level in lakes and reservoirs, which may limit municipal water supplies and impair swimming, fishing, and other recreational activities.

Lower flows during a summer drought can reduce hydroelectric power generation at a time of year when warmer temperatures increase the demand for electricity for air conditioning. Conventional power plants also need adequate water for cooling".

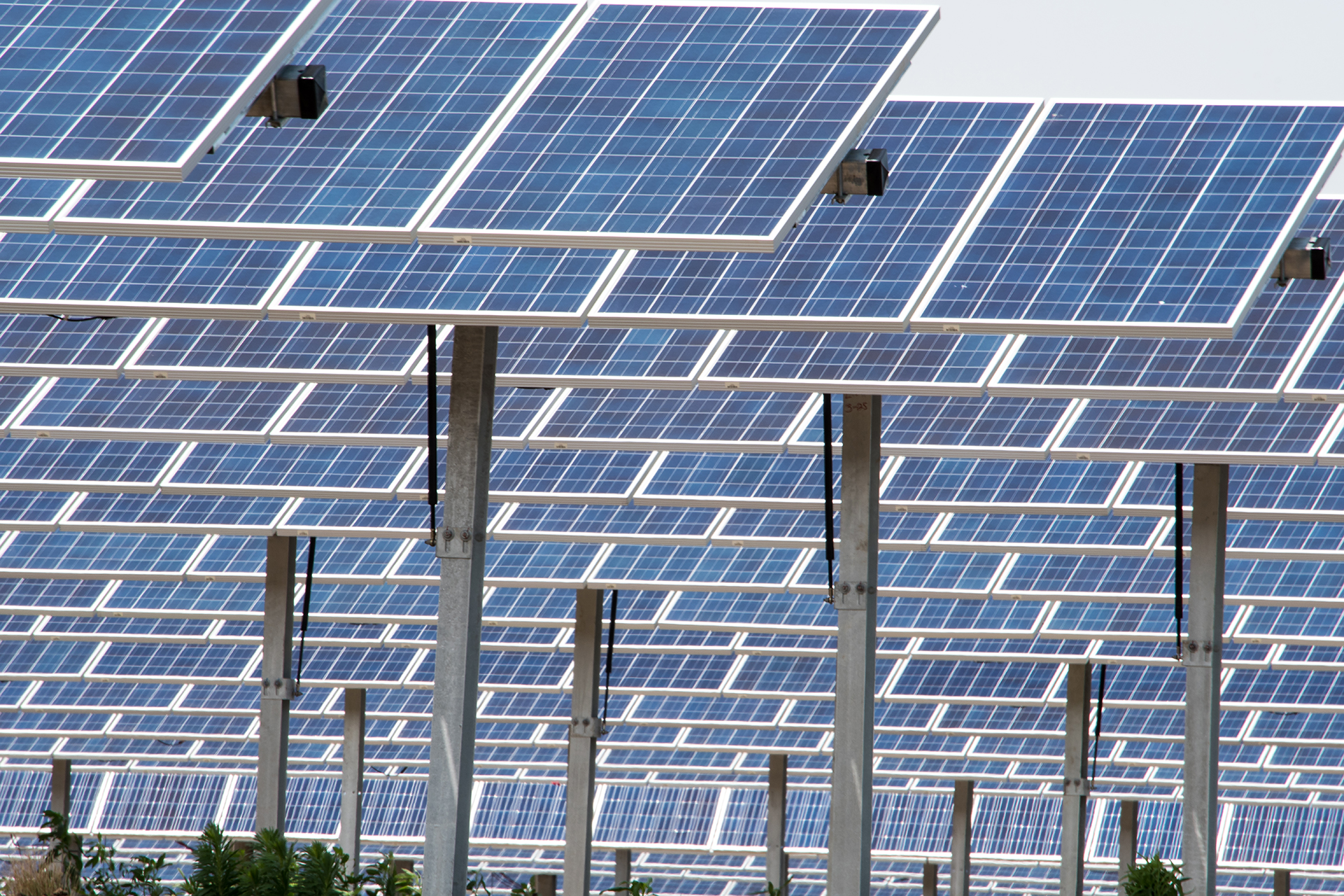
Lincoln Electric System community solar facility

"Higher temperatures and drier soils are likely to increase the use of water by more than 25 percent during the next 50 years, mostly because of increased irrigation. Approximately one-third of the farmland in Nebraska is irrigated with ground water, most of which comes from the High Plains Aquifer System, and municipal water supplies also reply primarily on ground water. In Nebraska, the aquifer is only being depleted in a few western areas. But water levels are declining throughout much of Kansas, where the average temperature today is similar to what the average temperature of Nebraska is likely to be 70 to 100 years from now".

== Agriculture ==
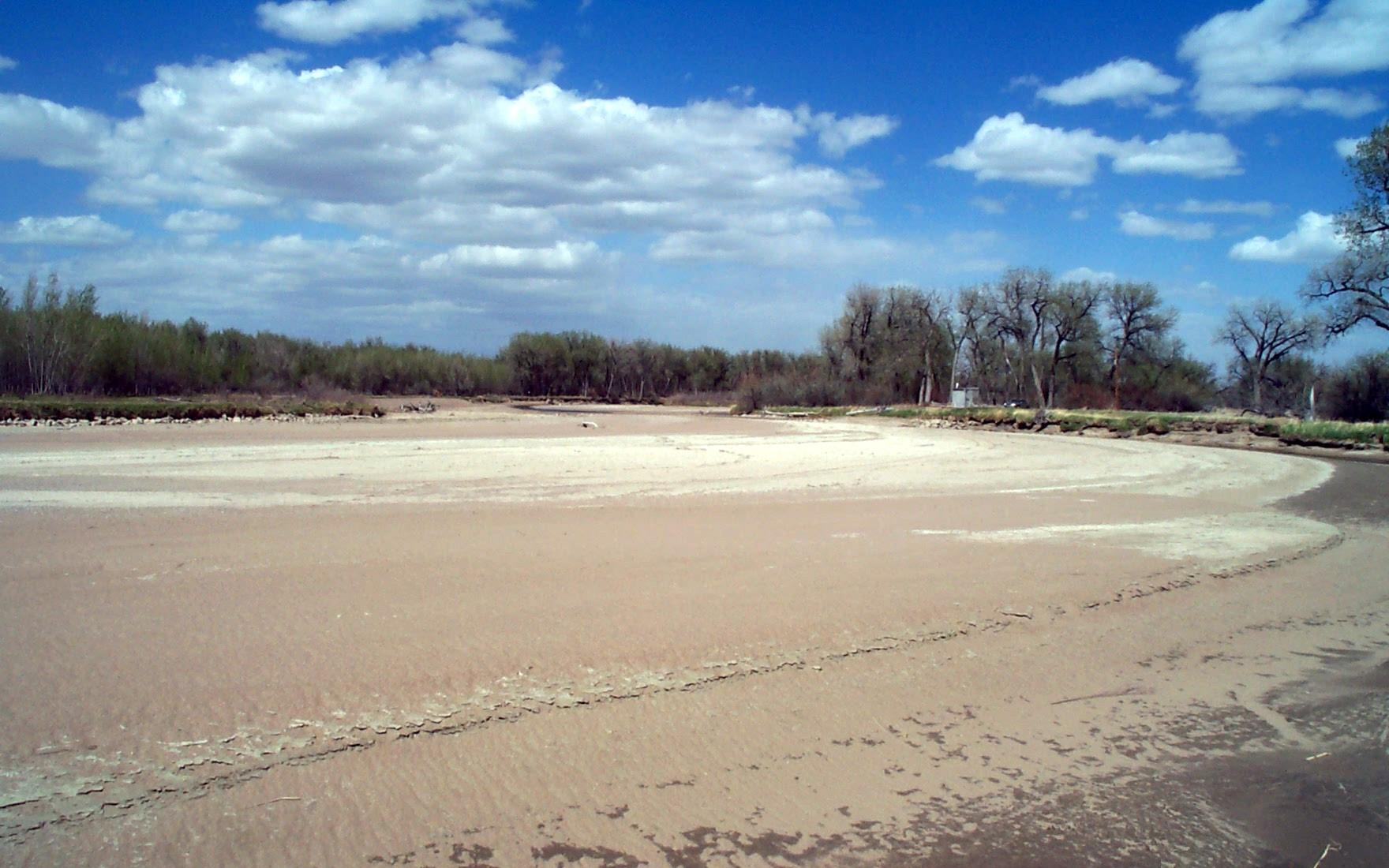
Drought on North Platte River in Wyoming above Nebraska, May 2002

"Rising temperatures and changes in rainfall are likely to have both negative and positive effects on Nebraska’s farms and ranches. Hot weather causes cows to eat less and grow more slowly, and it can threaten their health. Increased winter and spring precipitation could leave some fields too wet to plant, and warmer winters may promote the growth of weeds and pests. Hotter summers and drier soils would cause droughts to become more intense. Over the next 70 years, the number of days per year above 100°F is likely to double.

Increased drought, along with a greater number of extremely hot days, could cause crop failures. Even where ample water is available, higher temperatures would reduce yields of corn. Increased concentrations of carbon dioxide, however, may increase yields of wheat and soybean enough to offset the impact of higher temperatures. Warmer and shorter winters may allow for a longer growing season, which could allow two crops per year instead of one in some instances. Increased precipitation at the beginning of the growing season could also be beneficial to some crops".

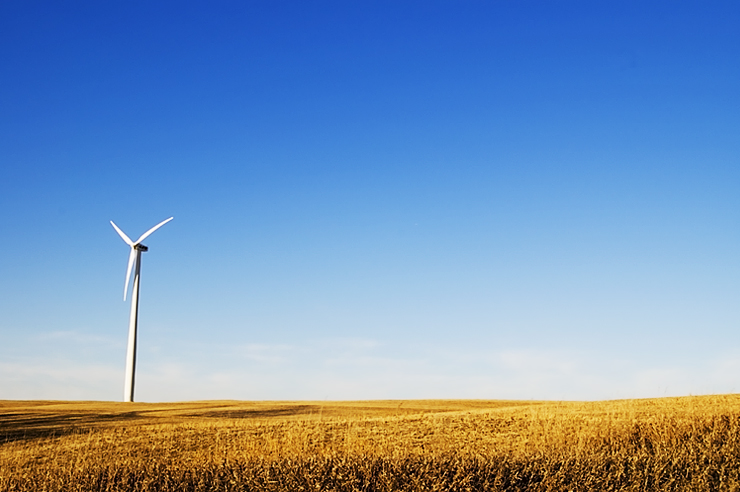
Wind turbine near Lincoln

UNL has noted that the effects of climate change on specific large bodies of water like the Platte River "have raised alarms for the agricultural community".

== Rainstorms and tornadoes ==
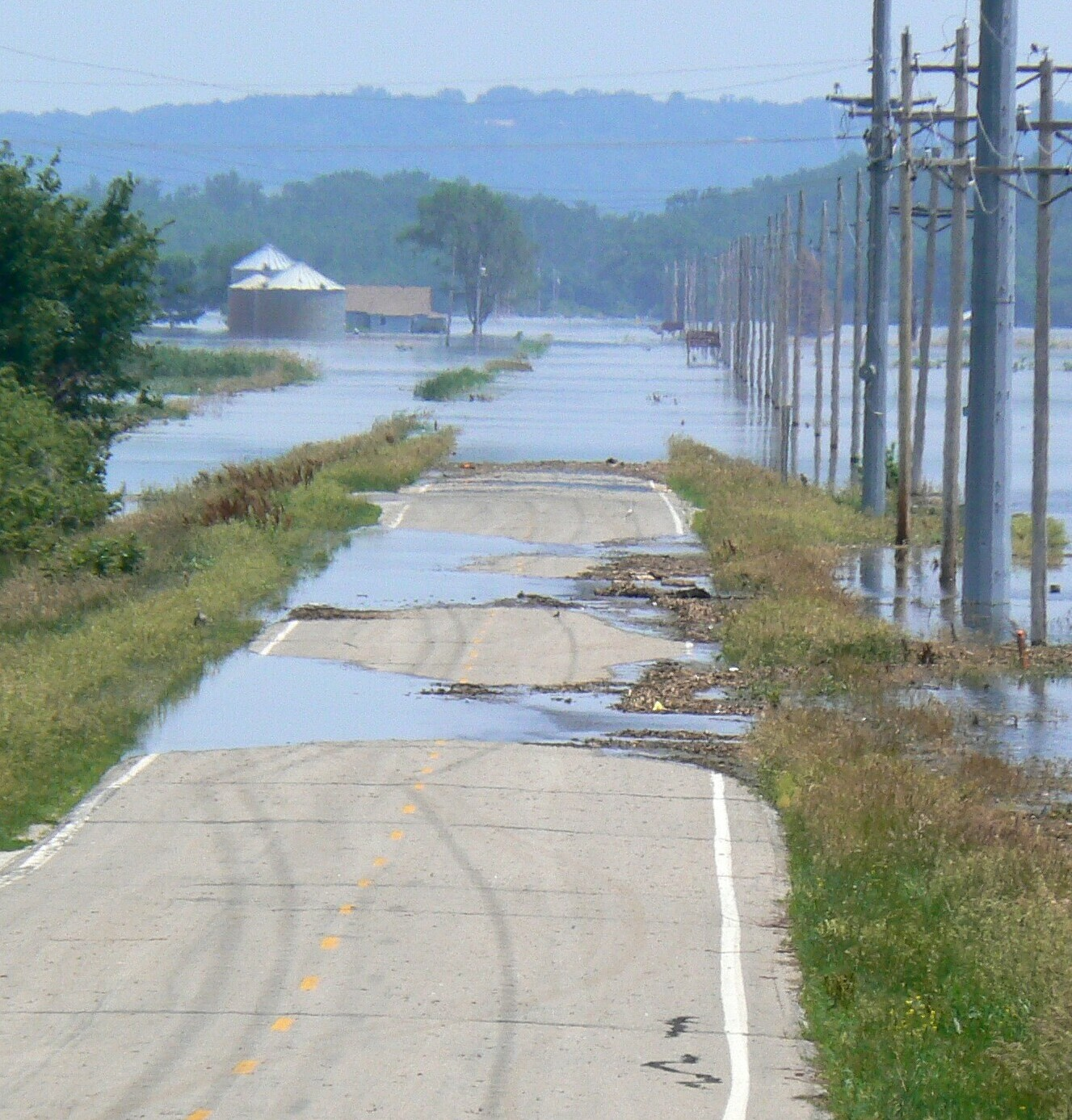
Flooded road, 2011 floods

"Although summer droughts are likely to become more severe, floods may also intensify. During the last 50 years, the amount of rain falling during the wettest four days of the year has increased about 15 percent in the Great Plains. River levels during floods have become higher in eastern Nebraska. Over the next several decades, heavy downpours will account for an increasing fraction of all precipitation, and average precipitation during winter and spring is likely to increase. Both of these factors would further increase flooding".

"Scientists do not know how the frequency and severity of tornadoes will change. Rising concentrations of greenhouse gases tend to increase humidity, and thus atmospheric instability, which would encourage tornadoes. But wind shear is likely to decrease, which would discourage tornadoes".

"Research is ongoing to learn whether tornadoes will be more or less frequent in the future. Because Nebraska experiences more than 50 tornadoes a year, such research is closely followed by meteorologists in the state".

== Grassroots organizing on climate-related issues ==
A book by Mary Pipher, The Green Boat, documents individual actions by Nebraskans on climate and environment, and a local coalition opposing Nebraska Bill LB 1161, which authorized use of eminent domain in Nebraska for the Keystone XL pipeline.

== Energy mix and commitment to net-zero carbon emissions ==
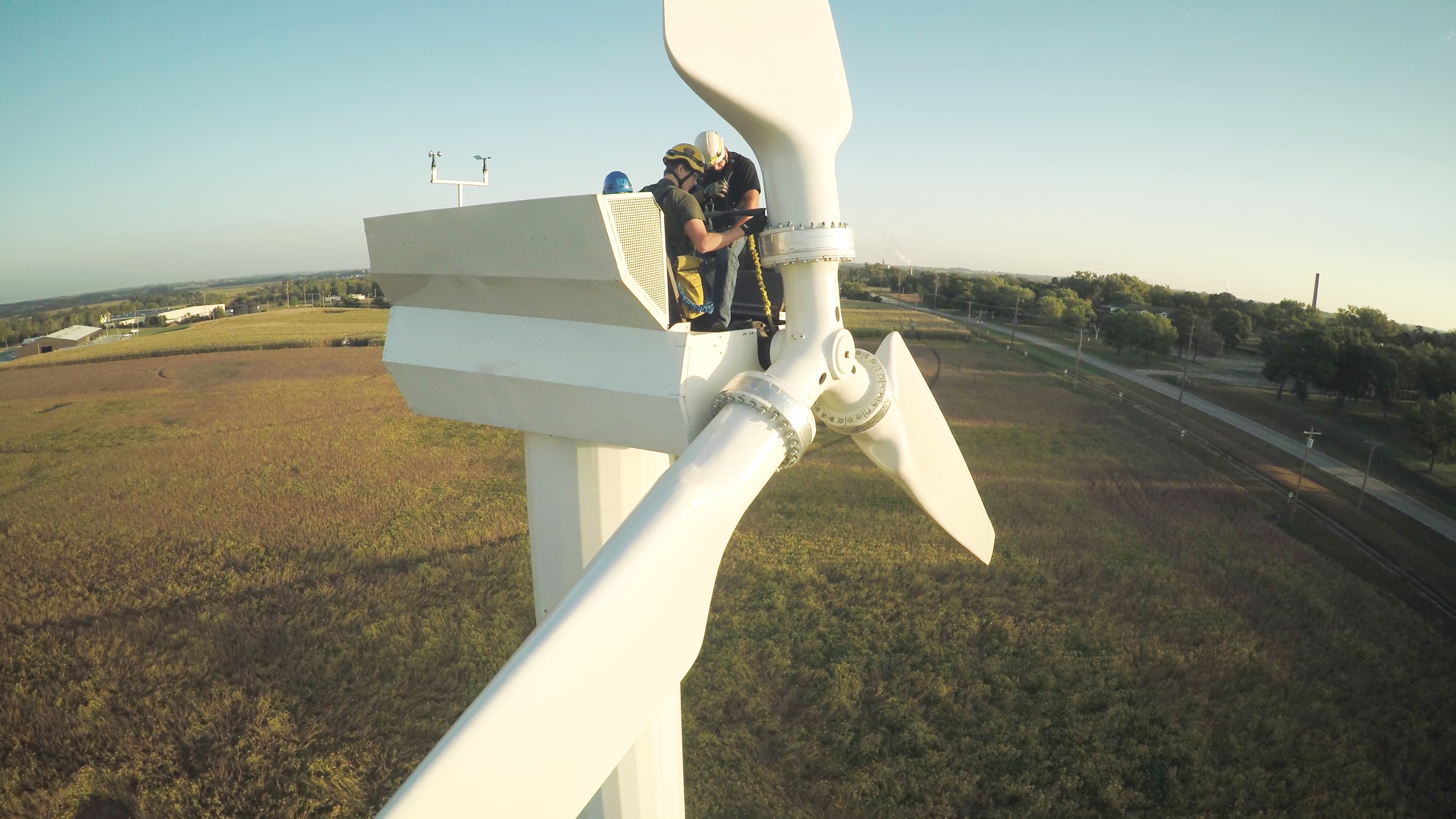
Wind turbine, Northeast Community College

In December 2019, the board of the Omaha Public Power District voted to commit to net-zero emissions by 2050. A a 400- to 600-megawatt solar array is planned, as is the closing three gas fired power units, and conversion of two coal-burning units to natural gas. Nebraska legislator John S. McCollister praised the decision, stating that "Nebraska has the third best wind energy generating potential of any state," and emphasizing the employment impact of wind energy projects.
