= List of University of Nebraska College of Law alumni =

This is a list of notable alumni of the University of Nebraska College of Law.

== Academics ==
- Ben Mark Cherrington (1934) – co-founder of UNESCO
- August Hjalmar Edgren (1902) – linguist, professor, and author
- Renee Fajardo – author and activist
- Harold Felton (1928) – writer and folklorist
- Harvey Perlman (1966) – chancellor of the University of Nebraska–Lincoln
- Allan F. Smith (1940) – dean of University of Michigan Law School

== Athletics ==
- Clete Blakeman (1991) – National Football League referee
- Vic Halligan (1917) – football player and lawyer
- Verne Lewellen – football quarterback
- Francis Schmidt (1908) – football player and coach
- Jake Young (1994) – football center

== Law ==
=== Attorney ===
- Jon Bruning (1994) – attorney general of Nebraska
- Deborah R. Gilg (1977) – attorney for the District Court for the District of Nebraska
- Jonathan Hatami (2002) – district attorney for the Los Angeles County District Attorney office
- Thomas J. Monaghan (1972) – attorney for the District Court for the District of Nebraska
- Christian A. Sorensen (1916) – attorney general of Nebraska
- Joe Stecher (1983) – attorney for the District Court for the District of Nebraska
- Evelle J. Younger – attorney general of California

=== Judge ===
- David Arterburn (1985) – judge of the Nebraska Court of Appeals
- C. Arlen Beam (1965) – judge of the Court of Appeals for the Eighth Circuit
- Riko E. Bishop (1992) – judge of the Nebraska Court of Appeals
- Leslie Boslaugh (1941) – justice of the Nebraska Supreme Court
- Newton D. Burch (1898) – justice of the South Dakota Supreme Court
- William G. Cambridge (1955) – judge of the District Court for the District of Nebraska
- Laurie Smith Camp (1977) – judge of the District Court for the District of Nebraska
- William B. Cassel (1979) – justice of the Nebraska Supreme Court
- Kristine Cecava (1976) – district judge of Cheyenne County, Nebraska
- E. B. Chappell (1916) – justice of the Nebraska Supreme Court
- Dale E. Fahrnbruch (1952) – justice of the Nebraska Supreme Court
- George W. Farr (1896) – justice of the Montana Supreme Court
- John Freudenberg (1995) – justice of the Nebraska Supreme Court
- Jeffrey J. Funke (1994) – justice of the Nebraska Supreme Court
- Fred L. Gibson (1898) – associate justice of the Montana Supreme Court
- L. Steven Grasz (1989) – judge of the Court of Appeals for the Eighth Circuit
- Norman B. Gray (1928) – justice of the Wyoming Supreme Court
- William C. Hastings (1948) – justice of the Nebraska Supreme Court
- Michael Heavican (1975) – chief justice of the Nebraska Supreme Court
- John V. Hendry (1974) – chief justice of the Nebraska Supreme Court
- Everett Inbody (1970) – judge of the Nebraska Court of Appeals
- Harvey M. Johnsen (1919) – chief judge of the Court of Appeals for the Eighth Circuit
- Max J. Kelch (1981) – justice of the Nebraska Supreme Court
- Richard G. Kopf (1972) – chief judge of the District Court for the District of Nebraska
- Norman Krivosha (1958) – chief justice of the Nebraska Supreme Court
- Charles S. Lobingier (1894) – international judge
- Frankie J. Moore (1983) – judge of the Nebraska Court of Appeals
- Joseph H. Morgan (1910) – justice of the Arizona Supreme Court
- John E. Newton – justice of the Nebraska Supreme Court
- John Coleman Pickett (1922) – judge of the Court of Appeals for the Tenth Circuit
- Michael W. Pirtle (1978) – judge of the Nebraska Court of Appeals
- Raymond Eugene Plummer (1939) – judge of the District Court for the District of Alaska
- Walter Lyndon Pope (1909) – judge of the Court of Appeals for the Ninth Circuit
- William J. Riley (1972) – chief judge of the Court of Appeals for the Eighth Circuit
- Donald Roe Ross (1948) – judge of the Court of Appeals for the Eighth Circuit
- Robert G. Simmons (1915) – chief justice of the Nebraska Supreme Court
- Stephanie F. Stacy (1993) – justice of the Nebraska Supreme Court
- Kenneth C. Stephan (1973) justice of the Nebraska Supreme Court
- Robert Van Pelt (1922) – judge of the District Court for the District of Nebraska
- John F. Wright (1970) – justice of the Nebraska Supreme Court

=== Solicitor general ===
- J. Lee Rankin (1930) – solicitor general of the United States

== Military ==
- Gary D. Brown (1987) – officer in the U.S. Air Force
- Theodore Kanamine (1954) – brigadier general in the U.S. Army
- John J. Pershing (1893) – general of the Armies, commander of the American Expeditionary Forces

== Politics ==
=== Governors ===
- Ralph G. Brooks (1930) – governor of Nebraska
- Stanley K. Hathaway (1950) – governor of Wyoming
- Frank B. Morrison (1931) – governor of Nebraska
- Ben Nelson (1970) – governor of Nebraska, U.S. senator (NE)
- Charles Thone (1950) – governor of Nebraska, U.S. representative (NE)
- Arthur J. Weaver (1896) – governor of Nebraska

=== Congressmen ===
- Howard M. Baldrige (1921) – U.S. representative (NE)
- Elmer Burkett (1893) – U.S. senator (NE)
- George E. Danielson (1939) – U.S. representative (CA)
- Hal Daub (1966) – chairman of the Social Security Advisory Board and U.S. representative (NE)
- Mike Flood (2001) – U.S. representative (NE)
- George H. Heinke (1908) – U.S. representative (NE)
- Fred Gustus Johnson (1903) – U.S. representative (NE)
- David Karnes (1974) – U.S. senator (NE)
- Thomas F. Konop (1904) – U.S. representative (WI)
- John A. Maguire (1899) – U.S. representative (NE)
- Howard Shultz Miller (1900) – U.S. representative (KS)
- James F. O'Connor (1904) – U.S. representative (MT)

=== Local representatives ===
- John Adams (1929) – member of the Nebraska Legislature
- Chris Beutler (1973) – mayor of Lincoln
- Kermit Brashear (1969) – speaker of the Nebraska Legislature
- Curt Bromm (1970) – speaker of the Nebraska Legislature
- Danielle Conrad (2003) – member of the Nebraska Legislature
- Wendy DeBoer (1999) – member of the Nebraska Legislature
- Matt Hansen (2013) – member of the Nebraska Legislature
- Steve Hogan (1971) – mayor of Aurora, Colorado
- Joe Kelly (1981) – lieutenant governor of Nebraska
- Helen Klanderud – mayor of Aspen, Colorado
- David Landis (1971) – member of the Nebraska Legislature
- Ira J. McDonald (1928) – member of the Los Angeles City Council
- Adam Morfeld (2012) – member of the Nebraska Legislature
- Patty Pansing Brooks (1984) – member of the Nebraska Legislature
- Pete Pirsch (1997) – member of the Nebraska Legislature
- Les Seiler (1966) – member of the Nebraska Legislature
- Julie Slama (2022) – member of the Nebraska Legislature
- John Wightman (1963) – member of the Nebraska Legislature
- Matt Williams (1974) – member of the Nebraska Legislature

=== Other political figures ===
- G. Bradford Cook (1961) – chairman of the U.S. Securities and Exchange Commission
- David Domina (1972) – political lawyer
- Mark Fahleson (1992) – chairman of the Nebraska Republican Party
- David Hahn (1981) – nominee for governor of Nebraska
- John R. McCarl (1903) – first comptroller general of the United States
- Mark Quandahl (1987) – chairman of the Nebraska Republican Party
- Ted Sorensen (1949) – speechwriter and White House counsel to John F. Kennedy
- Lee C. White (1953) – White House counsel to Lyndon B. Johnson
- William Merrill Whitman (1935) – legal representative of the Panama Canal Zone
- Clayton Yeutter (1963) – U.S. secretary of agriculture
