= List of United States attorneys for the District of Nebraska =

United States Attorney for the District of Nebraska
- Seal of the Department of Justice

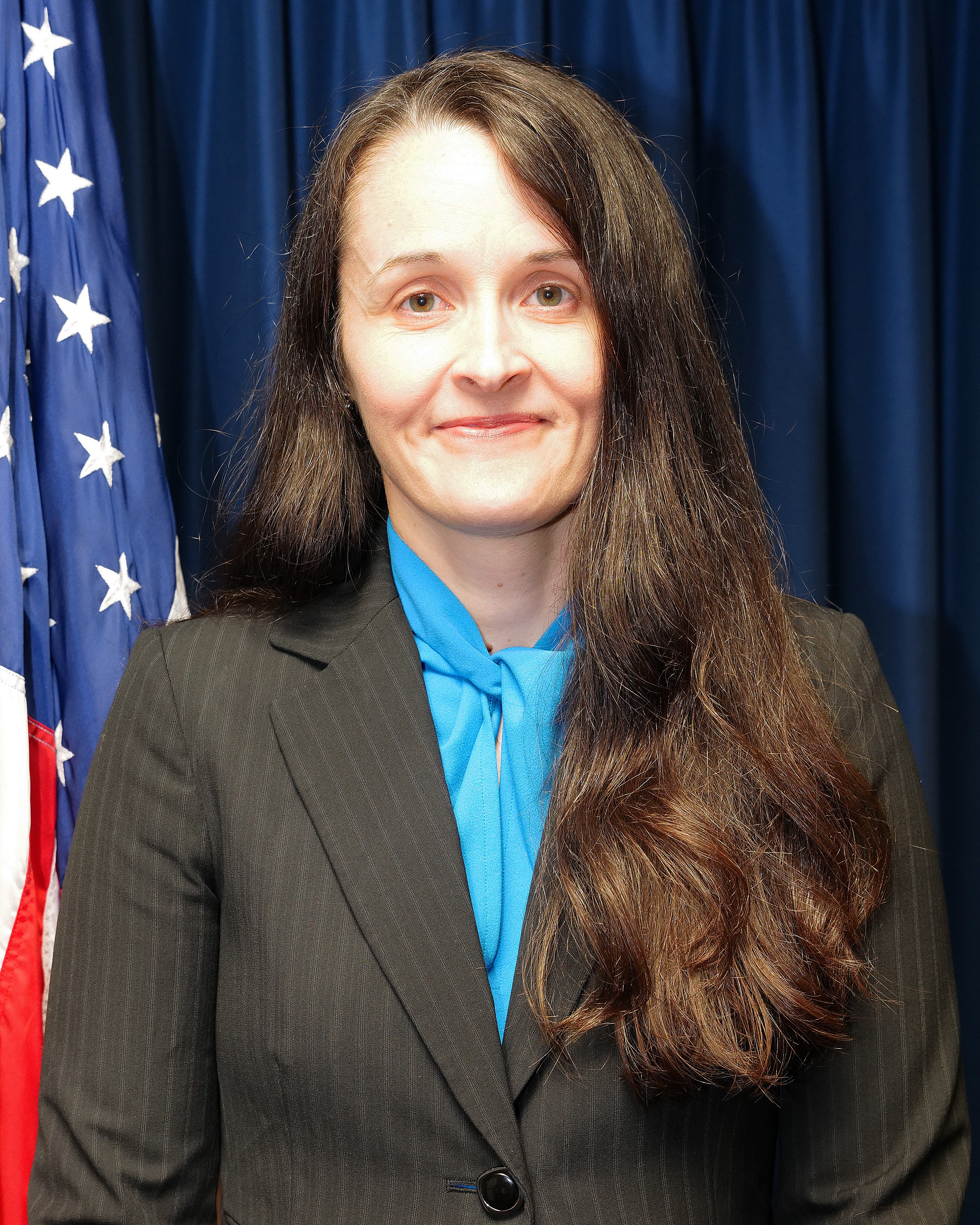
- Incumbent; Lesley Woods Murphy since October 7, 2025
- Department of Justice
- Reports to: U.S. Attorney General
- Seat: Omaha, Nebraska
- Appointer: The president with Senate advice and consent
- Inaugural holder: Experience Estabrook (Nebraska Territory); Daniel Gantt (State of Nebraska)
- Formation: 1854 (Territorial); 1867 (State)
- Website: justice.gov/usao-ne

The office of United States attorney for the District of Nebraska was created when Nebraska became a state in 1867 and continues to the present day. It was preceded by the office of the United States attorney for the Territory of Nebraska, which began with the creation of Nebraska Territory by the Kansas–Nebraska Act in 1854. The U.S. Attorney's Office for the District of Nebraska represents the United States in civil and criminal litigation in the United States District Court for the District of Nebraska. As of 2025, the U.S. Attorney is Lesley Woods Murphy.

== List of territorial U.S. attorneys ==
#	Image	U.S. Attorney	Years	Appointed by
1		Experience Estabrook	1854–1859	Franklin Pierce
2		Leavitt L. Bowen	1859–1860	James Buchanan
3		Robert A. Howard	1860–1861	James Buchanan
4		David L. Collier	1861–1864	Abraham Lincoln
5		Daniel Gantt	1864–1867	Abraham Lincoln

== List of U.S. attorneys for the District of Nebraska ==
#	Image	U.S. Attorney	Years	Appointed by
1		Daniel Gantt	1867–1876	Abraham Lincoln (Note: Gantt's appointment continued after Nebraska became a state in 1867.)
2		James Neville	1876–1878	Ulysses S. Grant
3		Gerrio M. Sambertson	1878–1887	Rutherford B. Hayes
4		George E. Prichett	1887–1890	Grover Cleveland
5		Benjamin S. Baker	1890–1894	Benjamin Harrison
6		Andrew Jackson Sawyer	1894–1898	Grover Cleveland
7		Williamson S. Summers	1898–1904	William McKinley
8		Irving F. Baxter	1904–1905	Theodore Roosevelt
9		Charles A. Goss	1905–1910	Theodore Roosevelt
10		Francis S. Howell	1910–1915	William Howard Taft
11		Thomas S. Allen	1915–1921	Woodrow Wilson
12		James C. Kinsler	1921–1930	Warren G. Harding
13		Charles E. Sandall	1930–1935	Herbert Hoover
14		Joseph T. Votava	1935–1954	Franklin D. Roosevelt
15		Donald Roe Ross	1954–1956	Dwight Eisenhower
16		Henry W. Shackelford	1956	Dwight Eisenhower
17		William C. Spire	1956–1961	Dwight Eisenhower
18		Theodore L. Richling	1961–1969	John F. Kennedy
19		Richard A. Dier	1969–1972	Richard Nixon
20		William K. Schaphorst	1972–1975	Richard Nixon
21		Daniel E. Wherry	1975–1977	Gerald Ford
22		Edward G. Warin	1977–1981	Jimmy Carter
–		Thomas D. Thalken	1981	Acting
23		Ronald D. Lahners	1981–1993	Ronald Reagan
24		Thomas J. Monaghan	1993–2001	Bill Clinton
25		Michael Heavican	2001–2006	George W. Bush
26		Joe Stecher	2006–2009	George W. Bush
27		Deborah R. Gilg	2009–2017	Barack Obama
–		Robert C. Stuart	2017–2018	Acting
28		Joseph P. Kelly	2018–2021	Donald Trump
–		Jan W. Sharp	2021–2022	Acting
–		Steven A. Russell	2022–2023	Acting
29		Susan T. Lehr	2023–2025	Court appointed (Note: Joe Biden failed to nominate a U.S. Attorney for the District of Nebraska during his tenure in office.)
30		Lesley Woods Murphy	2025–present	Donald Trump
