= List of first women lawyers and judges in Nebraska =

This is a list of the first women lawyer(s) and judge(s) in Nebraska. It includes the year in which the women were admitted to practice law (in parentheses). Also included are women who achieved other distinctions such becoming the first in their state to graduate from law school or become a political figure.

== Firsts in state history ==
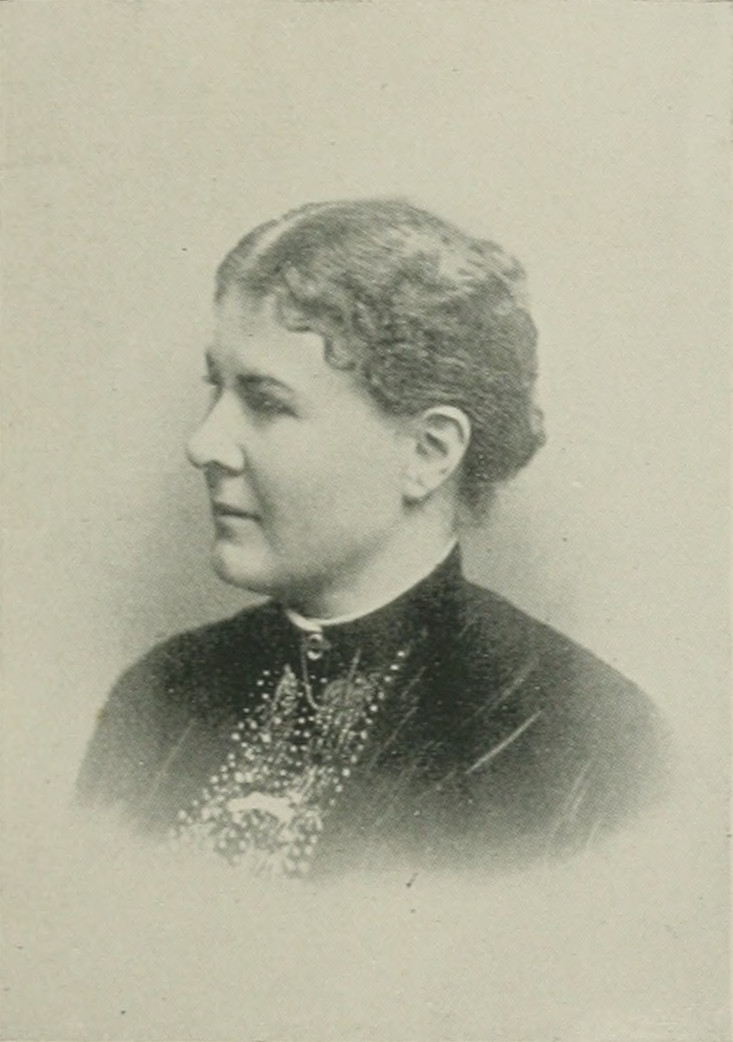
Ada Bittenbender: First female lawyer in Nebraska (1882)

=== Lawyers ===
- First female: Ada Bittenbender (1882)
- First Native American female (Winnebago): Julia St. Cyr (c. 1907)
- First African American female: Zanzye H.A. Hill (1929)
- First Latino American female: Olivia Guerra (1976)

=== State judges ===
- First (African American) female: Elizabeth Davis Pittman (1949) in 1971
- First female (district court): Betty Peterson Sharp in 1972
- First female (separate juvenile court): Colleen R. Buckley in 1973
- First female (county court): Mary Gilbride in 1992
- First female (Nebraska Court of Appeals): Lindsey Miller-Lerman in 1992
- First female (workers' compensation court): Laureen Van Norman in 1993
- First female (district court): Mary Gilbride in 1998
- First female (Nebraska Supreme Court): Lindsey Miller-Lerman in 1998
- First Hispanic American (female): Marcela A. Keim in 2011
- First Asian American (female): Riko E. Bishop in 2013 (upon her appointment to the Nebraska Court of Appeals)
- First Native American (female) (district court): Andrea Miller in 2018
- First African American female (district court): Tressa Alioth in 2021
- First Native American (female) to sit on a Nebraska Supreme Court case: Andrea Miller in 2022

=== Federal judge ===
- First female (U.S. District Court for the District of Nebraska): Laurie Smith Camp

=== Deputy Attorney General ===
- First female (for criminal matters): Laurie Smith Camp

=== United States Attorney ===
- First female: Deborah Gilg in 2009

=== County Attorney ===
- First female: Grace Ballard (1914) during the 1920s

=== Nebraska Bar Association ===
- First female president: Amy Longo (1979) in 1999

== Firsts in local history ==
- Mary Gilbride: First female to serve as a county judge (1992) and district court judge (1998) in the Fifth Judicial District, Nebraska [Boone, Butler, Colfax, Hamilton, Merrick, Nance, Platte, Polk, Saunders, Seward and York Counties, Nebraska]
- Stefanie Martinez: First Latino American female to serve as a Judge of the County Court, Second Judicial District in Nebraska (2013) [Cass, Otoe, and Sarpy Counties, Nebraska]
- Karen Ditsch (1992): First female elected County Attorney in Box Butte County, Nebraska (1999-2004)
- Frances O’Linn (1891): First female lawyer in Dawes County, Nebraska
- Elizabeth Davis Pittman (1949): First African American female to graduate from the Creighton School of Law in Omaha, Nebraska (1971). She was also the first female (and African American female) appointed to deputy on the staff of the Douglas County Attorney's Office (1964). [Douglas County, Nebraska]
- Zanzye H.A. Hill (1929): First African American female law graduate from the University of Nebraska-Lincoln (1929) [Lancaster County, Nebraska]
- Janice Gradwohl: First female judge in Lancaster County, Nebraska (1974). She was also the first Deputy County Attorney.
- Grace Ballard (1914): First female to serve as the County Attorney for Washington County, Nebraska (c. 1920s)

== See also ==
- List of first women lawyers and judges in the United States
- Timeline of women lawyers in the United States
- Women in law

== Other topics of interest ==
- List of first minority male lawyers and judges in the United States
- List of first minority male lawyers and judges in Nebraska
