= Theodore Carlson =

American judge (1938–2011)

Theodore L. Carlson

Judge of the Nebraska Court of Appeals
- In office December 11, 1998 – April 17, 2011
- Appointed by: Ben Nelson
- Preceded by: Lindsey Miller-Lerman
- Succeeded by: Michael W. Pirtle

Judge of the Fourth Judicial District Court of Nebraska
- In office October 14, 1983 – December 11, 1998
- Appointed by: Bob Kerrey
- Preceded by: Theodore Richling
- Succeeded by: Sandra Dougherty

Personal details
- Born: Theodore L. Carlson; July 23, 1938 Wakefield, Nebraska
- Died: April 17, 2011 (aged 72) Omaha, Nebraska
- Spouse: Debra Carlson
- Children: Zackary
- Education: University of Omaha (BA); Creighton University School of Law (LLB, JD)
- Occupation: Judge

Theodore L. Carlson (July 23, 1938 – April 17, 2011) was an American attorney and judge who served as a member of the Nebraska Court of Appeals from 1998 to 2011.

== Early life ==
Carlson was born in Wakefield, and graduated from Omaha Central High School in 1956. He attended the University of Omaha, graduating with his bachelor's degree in 1960. He attended the Creighton University School of Law, graduating with his L.L.B. in 1963 and his Juris Doctor in 1968. After graduating in 1963, he worked as an assistant trust officer in San Francisco for Bank of America, and returned to Omaha, where he was an attorney in private practice. Carlson was an assistant city prosecutor from 1969 to 1971.

== Judicial career ==
In 1971, Carlson was appointed by Governor J. James Exon to the Omaha Municipal Court. He was retained by votes in 1974, winning 84 percent of the vote, and in 1980 with 80 percent of the vote.

Following the retirement of Judge Theodore Richling, Carlson was appointed by Governor Bob Kerrey to the Fourth Judicial District Court.

In 1984, Carlson was appointed by Chief Justice Norman Krivosha to serve on a three-judge panel to decide the sentence of serial killer John Joubert, who confessed to the killing of two boys in 1983. Carlson served on the panel with two other District Court judges: Robert T. Finn and Ronald Reagan, who had presided over Joubert's case. On October 9, 1984, the panel unanimously agreed to sentence Joubert to death, and urged the modification of state law to include "conduct such as the defendant's that reasonably causes substantial fear, apprehension or concern in the community at large as an aggravating circumstance" in imposing the death penalty. The Omaha World-Herald praised the "careful deliberation," "seriousness with which the judges went about the sentencing," and "courageous decision."

Carlson was retained in 1986 with 78 percent of the vote, in 1992 with 69 percent of the vote, and in 1998 with 74 percent of the vote.

== Nebraska Court of Appeals ==
In 1998, Governor Ben Nelson appointed Judge Lindsey Miller-Lerman of the Nebraska Court of Appeals to the Supreme Court. On November 2, 1998, the day before Carlson stood for retention on the District Court, Nelson announced that he would appoint Carlson to the Court of Appeals.

Carlson was retained in 2002 with 76 percent of the vote, and in 2008 with 67 percent of the vote.

Carlson was diagnosed with cancer in November 2010 and died on April 16, 2011.
