= List of first minority male lawyers and judges in Nebraska =

This is a list of the first minority male lawyer(s) and judge(s) in Nebraska. It includes the year in which the men were admitted to practice law (in parentheses). Also included are men who achieved other distinctions such becoming the first in their state to graduate from law school or become a political figure.

== Firsts in state history ==
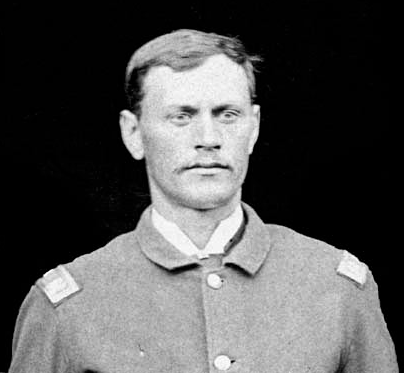
Thomas L. Sloan: First Native American male (Omaha people) male lawyer to argue a case before the U.S. Supreme Court (1904)

=== Lawyers ===
- First African American: Silas Robbins (1889)
- First Native American (Omaha people) male: Hiram Chase (1889)
- First Native American (Omaha people) male to argue a case before the U.S. Supreme Court: Thomas L. Sloan (1892) in 1904
- First Jewish American male: Simeon Bloom
- First university-trained African American male: Harrison J. Pinkett (1906)

=== State judges ===
- First Native American male: Hiram Chase in 1893
- First African American male (district court): Marlon Polk in 2005
- First African American male (Nebraska Supreme Court): Derek Vaughn in 2025

=== District Attorney ===
- First African American male: Amos P. Scruggs in 1920

== Firsts in local history ==
- Marlon Polk: First African American male to become a Judge of the Fourth Judicial District Court in Nebraska (2005) [Douglas County, Nebraska]

== See also ==
- List of first minority male lawyers and judges in the United States

== Other topics of interest ==
- List of first women lawyers and judges in the United States
- List of first women lawyers and judges in Nebraska
