= Richard D. Sievers =

American attorney and judge

Judge of the Nebraska Court of Appeals
- In office February 1, 1992 – May 31, 2013
- Appointed by: Ben Nelson
- Preceded by: Position established
- Succeeded by: Riko E. Bishop

Personal details
- Born: December 31, 1947 (age 78) Scottsbluff, Nebraska
- Spouse: Maggie St. John
- Children: 3 daughters
- Education: Kearney State College (BA); University of Nebraska College of Law (JD)
- Occupation: Judge

Richard D. Sievers (born December 31, 1947) is an American attorney and judge who served as a member of the Nebraska Court of Appeals from 1992 to 2013.

== Early life ==
Sievers was born in Scottsbluff and graduated from Gering High School in 1965. He attended the University of Wyoming and Scottsbluff Junior College, but ultimately matriculated at Kearney State College, where he graduated in 1969. Sievers then attended the University of Nebraska College of Law, graduating with his Juris Doctor in 1972. After graduating, he practiced law in Lincoln with the law firm of Bruckner, O'Gara, Keating, Sievers & Hendry for twenty years.

== Nebraska Court of Appeals ==
In 1991, after the creation of the Nebraska Court of Appeals, Governor Ben Nelson appointed Sievers to the court, representing District 1. He took office in 1992, and was named by the Nebraska Supreme Court as the Chief Judge of the court, serving until 1996, when he was succeeded by Lindsey Miller-Lerman.

Sievers was retained in 1996 with 67 percent of the vote, in 2002 with 76 percent of the vote, and in 2008 with 73 percent of the vote.

In 2013, Sievers announced that he would retire from the court, effective on May 31, 2013.
