= Riedmann =

Riedmann is a surname, Notable people with this name include

- Francie C. Riedmann (born 1963), American judge
- Gerhard Riedmann (1925-2004), Australian actor
- Linda Riedmann (born 2003), German cyclist

== See also ==
- Riesman
- Reedman
- Reeman
