= Lawrence E. Welch Jr. =

American judge

Judge of the Nebraska Court of Appeals
- Incumbent
- Assumed office March 28, 2018
- Appointed by: Pete Ricketts
- Preceded by: Everett Inbody

Personal details
- Education: Loyola Marymount University (B.S.); Creighton University School of Law (J.D.)

Lawrence E. Welch Jr. is a Judge of the Nebraska Court of Appeals.

== Education ==
Welch received his Bachelor of Science from Loyola Marymount University and his Juris Doctor from Creighton University School of Law.

== Legal career ==
Prior to his appointment to the bench he was a partner Welch Law Firm, P.C.; prior to this, Welch worked as an associate attorney for Fraser, Stryker, Vaughn, Meusey, Olson, Boyer & Bloch, P.C.

== Nebraska Court of Appeals service ==
On January 22, 2018, he was appointed to the Nebraska Court of Appeals by Governor Pete Ricketts, to the seat vacated by the retirement of Everett Inbody. He was sworn into office on March 18, 2018.

Legal offices
Preceded by Everett Inbody	Judge of the Nebraska Court of Appeals; 2018–present	Incumbent
