= Francie C. Riedmann =

American judge

Judge of the Nebraska Court of Appeals
- Incumbent
- Assumed office July 2012
- Appointed by: Dave Heineman
- Preceded by: William B. Cassel

Personal details
- Born: 1963 (age 62–63)
- Education: University of Nebraska at Kearney (B.S.); Creighton University School of Law (J.D.)

Francie C. Riedmann aka. Francie Riedmann Weis (born 1963) is a Judge of the Nebraska Court of Appeals.

== Education ==
Weis earned her Bachelor of Science from University of Nebraska at Kearney in 1985 and her paralegal certificate from the Denver Paralegal Institute in 1986. She received her Juris Doctor from Creighton University School of Law, graduating summa cum laude in 1993.

== Legal career ==
Weis was a law clerk, paralegal, and then associate with the law firm Gross & Welch between 1986 and 1996. From 1996 to 1999, she was an associate with the law firm Blackwell Sanders Peper Martin. In 1999, Weis returned to Gross & Welch as a shareholder and director. She remained with the firm until her appointment to the Nebraska Court of Appeals in July 2012.

== Nebraska Court of Appeals service ==
On July 17, 2012 Governor Dave Heineman appointed Reidmann to a seat on the Nebraska Court of Appeals, vacated by William B. Cassel, who was elevated to the Nebraska Supreme Court.

Legal offices
Preceded by William B. Cassel	Judge of the Nebraska Court of Appeals; 2012–present	Incumbent
