= Everett Inbody =

American judge

Chief Judge of the Nebraska Court of Appeals
- In office 2004–2014
- Succeeded by: Frankie J. Moore

Judge of the Nebraska Court of Appeals
- In office April 28, 1995 – January 1, 2018
- Appointed by: Ben Nelson
- Succeeded by: Lawrence E. Welch Jr.

Personal details
- Born: September 13, 1945 (age 80)
- Education: University of Nebraska (B.S.); University of Nebraska College of Law (J.D.)

Everett O. Inbody (born September 13, 1945) is a former Judge of the Nebraska Court of Appeals.

== Education ==
Inbody earned his Bachelor of Science from the University of Nebraska in 1967 and his Juris Doctor from the University of Nebraska College of Law in 1970. He also holds diplomas for judicial skills and humanities and judging from the American Academy of Judicial Education.

== Legal career ==
He began his legal career as a deputy county attorney in Saunders County. He was in private practice in Wahoo from 1970 to 1986. From 1970 to 1978 he was also Nebraska Crime Commission director of regions 4, 5 and 6. He was a 5th Judicial District county court judge from 1986 to 1991 and then a district court judge from 1991 to 1995. He joined the Nebraska Court of Appeals in 1995.

== Service on Nebraska Court of Appeals ==
He was appointed to the court by Governor Ben Nelson. He joined the court on April 28, 1995, and served as chief judge from 2004 to 2014. After serving as chief, he resumed his duties as an associate judge. He retired from active service on January 1, 2018.
