= Arterburn =

Arterburn is a surname. Notable people with the surname include:

- David K. Arterburn (born 1957), American judge
- Elmer Arterburn (1929–2019), American football player
- Jordan Arterburn and Tarlton Arterburn, 19th-century American slave traders
- Norman Arterburn (1902–1979), Justice of the Indiana Supreme Court
- Steve Arterburn (born 1953), American Christian author
