= Robert F. Rossiter Jr. =

American judge (born 1956)

Robert Rossiter
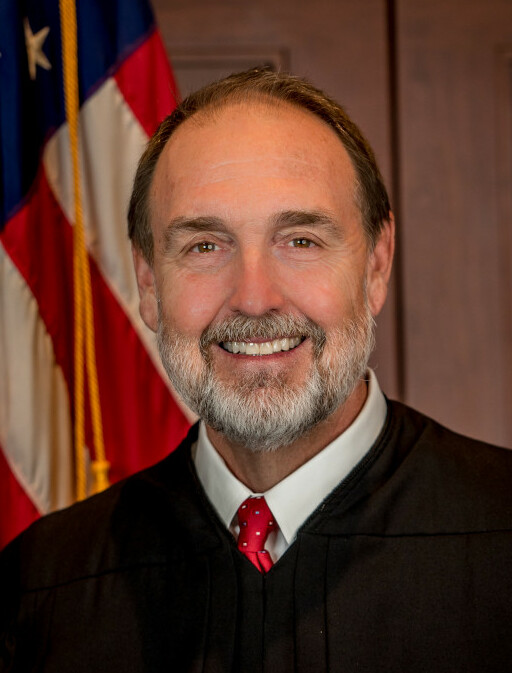
- Rossiter in 2020

Chief Judge of the United States District Court for the District of Nebraska
- In office July 15, 2021 – July 16, 2026
- Preceded by: John M. Gerrard
- Succeeded by: Brian C. Buescher

Judge of the United States District Court for the District of Nebraska
- Incumbent
- Assumed office June 29, 2016
- Appointed by: Barack Obama
- Preceded by: Joseph Bataillon

Personal details
- Born: Robert Francis Rossiter Jr. 1956 (age 69–70) Camp Lejeune, North Carolina, U.S.
- Education: Purdue University (BS); Creighton University (JD)

Robert Francis Rossiter Jr. (born 1956) is a United States district judge of the United States District Court for the District of Nebraska.

== Biography ==
Rossiter received a Bachelor of Science degree in 1978 from Purdue University. He received a Juris Doctor, cum laude, in 1981 from Creighton University School of Law. He was a law clerk for Judge C. Arlen Beam of the United States District Court for the District of Nebraska from 1982 to 1983. From 1983 to 2016, he worked at the Omaha, Nebraska, law firm of Fraser Stryker PC LLO, becoming a shareholder in 1987. He served on the firm's Management Committee from 2011 to 2016. He specialized in labor and employment litigation, primarily in federal court. He is a Fellow (Judicial) in the American College of Trial Lawyers and is the past state chair of that organization. He has served as adjunct faculty for Creighton University School of Law from 1983 to 1987 and again from 1999–present.

=== Federal judicial service ===
On June 11, 2015, President Barack Obama nominated Rossiter to serve as a United States district judge of the United States District Court for the District of Nebraska, to the seat vacated by Judge Joseph Bataillon, who assumed senior status on October 3, 2014. He received a hearing before the Judiciary Committee on September 30, 2015. On October 29, 2015 his nomination was reported out of committee by voice vote. On June 27, 2016 the United States Senate confirmed his nomination by a 90–0 vote. He received his judicial commission on June 29, 2016. He became chief judge on July 15, 2021.

Legal offices
Preceded by Joseph Bataillon	Judge of the United States District Court for the District of Nebraska; 2016–present	Incumbent
Preceded by John M. Gerrard	Chief Judge of the United States District Court for the District of Nebraska; 2021–2026	Succeeded by Brian C. Buescher
