= Pirtle =

Pirtle is a surname. Notable people with the surname include:

- Brittany Anne Pirtle, actress
- Cliff Pirtle (born 1985/86), American politician
- Gerry Pirtle (born 1947), American baseball player
- Jillian Patricia Pirtle (born 1983), American soprano and historian
- Michael W. Pirtle (born 1953), judge
- Woody Pirtle, American artist
