= John M. Gerrard =

American judge (born 1953)

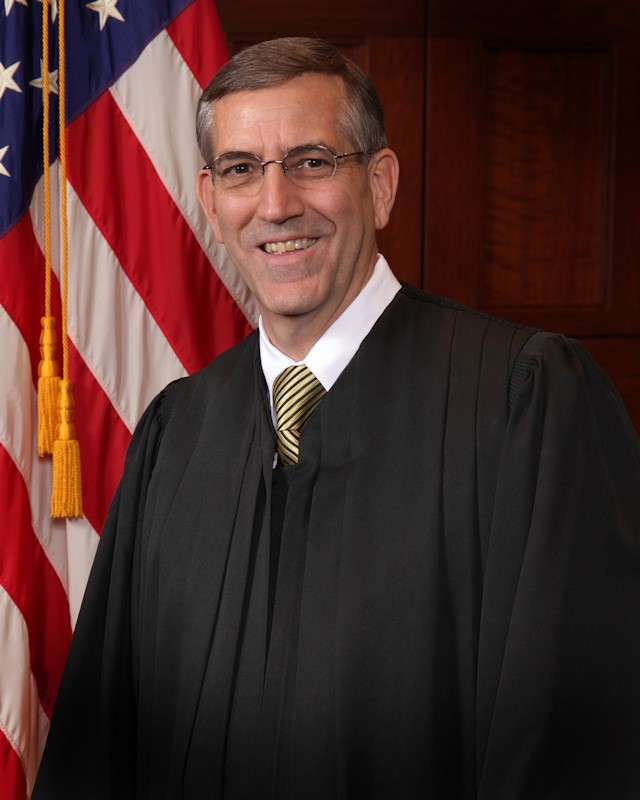

Senior Judge of the United States District Court for the District of Nebraska
- Incumbent
- Assumed office February 6, 2023

Chief Judge of the United States District Court for the District of Nebraska
- In office November 1, 2018 – July 15, 2021
- Preceded by: Laurie Smith Camp
- Succeeded by: Robert F. Rossiter Jr.

Judge of the United States District Court for the District of Nebraska
- In office February 6, 2012 – February 6, 2023
- Appointed by: Barack Obama
- Preceded by: Richard G. Kopf
- Succeeded by: Susan M. Bazis

Justice of the Nebraska Supreme Court
- In office 1995–2012
- Appointed by: Ben Nelson
- Preceded by: C. Thomas White
- Succeeded by: William B. Cassel

Personal details
- Born: John Melvin Gerrard; November 2, 1953 (age 72) Schuyler, Nebraska, U.S.
- Education: Nebraska Wesleyan University (BS); University of Arizona (MPA); University of the Pacific (JD)

John Melvin Gerrard (born November 2, 1953) is a senior United States district judge of the United States District Court for the District of Nebraska.

== Education and legal career ==
Gerrard graduated from Nebraska Wesleyan University with a Bachelor of Science in 1976; from the University of Arizona with a Masters in Public Administration in 1977; and from McGeorge School of Law at the University of the Pacific with a Juris Doctor in 1981. He is a member of Phi Kappa Tau fraternity. from 1981 to 1995, he was in private practice in Norfolk, Nebraska and from 1982 to 1995 he was city attorney for Battle Creek, Nebraska.

== Judicial service ==
=== Nebraska Supreme Court ===
In 1995, Governor Ben Nelson appointed Gerrard to the Nebraska Supreme Court. At age 41, Gerrard was the youngest ever appointee to the Nebraska Supreme Court. He left the court in 2012 upon appointment to the federal bench.

=== Federal judicial service ===
In January 2011, then U.S. Senator Ben Nelson recommended Gerrard to fill a seat on the United States District Court for the District of Nebraska that would be vacated later that year by Judge Richard G. Kopf. On May 4, 2011, President Barack Obama formally nominated Gerrard to replace Kopf on the federal bench. The United States Senate Committee on the Judiciary reported Gerrard's nomination to the Senate floor on October 13, 2011. The Senate confirmed Gerrard's nomination on January 23, 2012, by a 74–16 vote. He received his commission on February 6. He served as chief judge from 2018 to 2021. Gerrard assumed senior status on February 6, 2023.

== See also ==
- Nebraska Supreme Court

Legal offices
Preceded by C. Thomas White	Justice of the Nebraska Supreme Court; 1995–2012	Succeeded by William B. Cassel
Preceded by Richard G. Kopf	Judge of the United States District Court for the District of Nebraska; 2012–2023	Succeeded by Susan M. Bazis
Preceded by Laurie Smith Camp	Chief Judge of the United States District Court for the District of Nebraska; 2018–2021	Succeeded by Robert F. Rossiter Jr.
