= Robert V. Denney Federal Building =

Robert V. Denney Federal Building and Courthouse
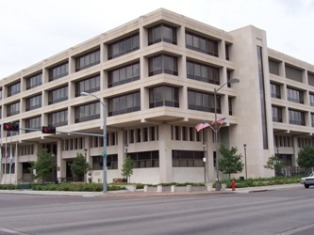
- Robert V. Denney Federal Building and Courthouse
- Interactive map of the Robert V. Denney Federal Building and Courthouse area

General information
- Status: Completed
- Type: Government offices
- Location: 100 Centennial Mall North; Lincoln, Nebraska
- Coordinates: 40°48′51″N 96°41′56″W

Technical details
- Floor count: 5

The Robert V. Denney Federal Building and Courthouse is a modern, five-story steel structure in Lincoln, Nebraska. The building is named after the late U.S. District Court judge and U.S. House of Representatives member. The U.S. Department of Agriculture, judiciary, and district courts serve as the building's primary tenants.
