= Lyle Elmer Strom =

American judge (1925–2023)

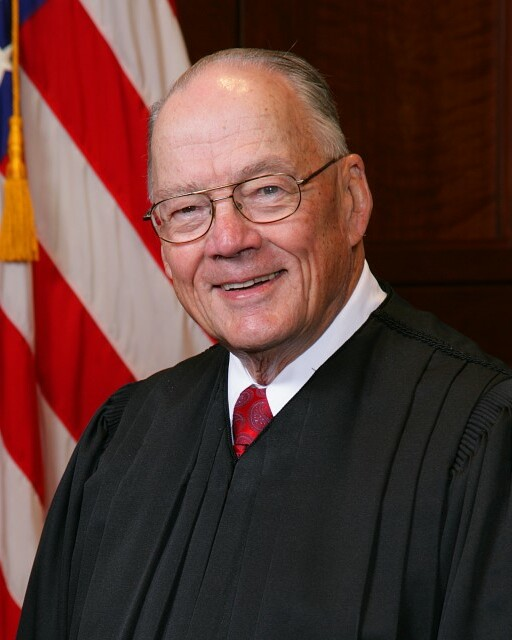

Senior Judge of the United States District Court for the District of Nebraska
- In office November 2, 1995 – December 1, 2023

Chief Judge of the United States District Court for the District of Nebraska
- In office 1987–1994
- Preceded by: C. Arlen Beam
- Succeeded by: William G. Cambridge

Judge of the United States District Court for the District of Nebraska
- In office October 28, 1985 – November 2, 1995
- Appointed by: Ronald Reagan
- Preceded by: Albert Gerard Schatz
- Succeeded by: Joseph Bataillon

Personal details
- Born: January 6, 1925 Omaha, Nebraska, U.S.
- Died: December 1, 2023 (aged 98) Omaha, Nebraska, U.S.
- Education: Creighton University (B.A.); Creighton University School of Law (J.D.)

Lyle Elmer Strom (January 6, 1925 – December 1, 2023) was a United States district judge of the United States District Court for the District of Nebraska from 1985 until his death in 2023.

== Education and career ==
Born in Omaha, Nebraska, on January 6, 1925, Strom received a Bachelor of Arts degree from Creighton University in 1950 and a Juris Doctor from Creighton University School of Law in 1953. He was a United States Naval Reserve Ensign during World War II, from 1943 to 1946. He was in private practice in Omaha from 1953 to 1985, also serving as an adjunct professor for the Creighton University School of Law in 1958. He was a clinical professor at the Creighton University School of Law, in the Robert Spire Intern Program, from 1996 through 2005.

== Federal judicial service ==
On September 27, 1985, Strom was nominated by President Ronald Reagan to a seat on the United States District Court for the District of Nebraska vacated by Albert Gerard Schatz. Strom was confirmed by the United States Senate on October 25, 1985 and received his commission on October 28, 1985. He served as Chief Judge from 1987 to 1994, assuming senior status on November 2, 1995. On June 6, 2017, Strom took inactive senior status in December 2017, meaning that while he remained a federal judge, he no longer heard cases or participated in the business of the court.

== Observations ==
Strom stated that his "vision for the law is that we restore the professionalism and civility that were its trademarks when he was admitted to practice… The Nebraska high school mock trial competition is now named after Strom and is referred to as the Judge Lyle Strom High School Mock Trial Championship.

== Personal life ==
Strom married Regina Ann Kelly on July 31, 1950. The couple raised seven children until her death on February 1, 2001. His daughter, Mary Hawkins, is the current President of Bellevue University in Bellevue, Nebraska. She has said of her late father, "He was adamant about treating people with respect, and he modeled that. And there was our work ethic. I don't care what he did, he told us that if a job's worth doing it's worth doing right."

One of Strom's other daughters, Major General Cassie A. Strom, retired in 2015 as the Air National Guard Assistant to the Judge Advocate General Corps. In this position, she was the principal advisor and liaison to The Judge Advocate General of the Air Force on Air National Guard legal matters and provided leadership, strategic planning, and management of the Air National Guard Judge Advocate program. Major General Strom deployed to Bosnia and Herzegovina twice and worked a variety of international peacekeeping exercises, serving in the Department of Defense Office of General Counsel in support of Operation Iraqi Freedom, and acted as the Deputy Staff Judge Advocate, United States Transportation Command.

In 1997 Strom's daughter, Susan Frances Strom, died in the Heaven's Gate cult mass suicide.

Lyle Strom died in Omaha on December 1, 2023, at the age of 98.

== Sources ==
Legal offices
Preceded by Albert Gerard Schatz	Judge of the United States District Court for the District of Nebraska; 1985–1995	Succeeded by Joseph Bataillon
Preceded by C. Arlen Beam	Chief Judge of the United States District Court for the District of Nebraska; 1987–1994	Succeeded by William G. Cambridge
