= Susan M. Bazis =

American judge (born 1968)

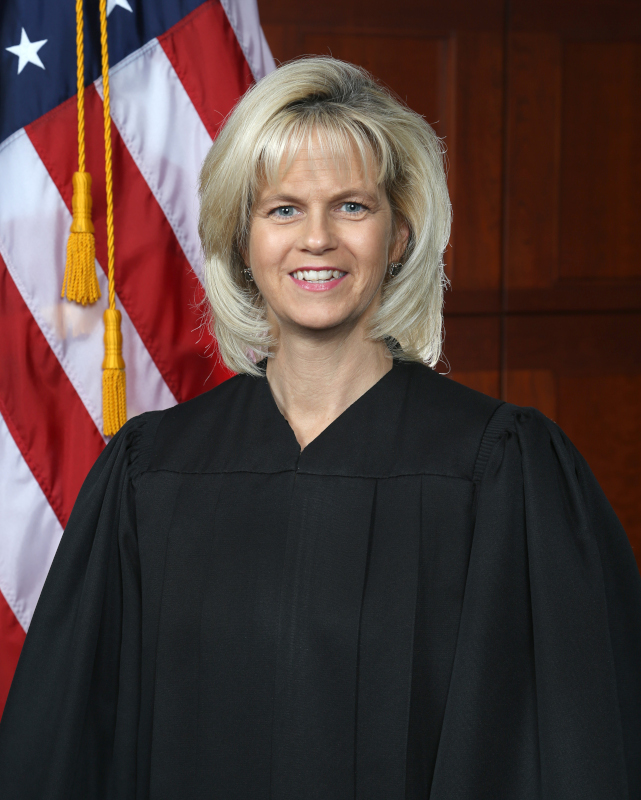

Judge of the United States District Court for the District of Nebraska
- Incumbent
- Assumed office April 10, 2024
- Appointed by: Joe Biden
- Preceded by: John M. Gerrard

Magistrate Judge of the United States District Court for the District of Nebraska
- In office January 1, 2017 – April 10, 2024
- Preceded by: Thomas D. Thalken
- Succeeded by: Ryan C. Carson

Personal details
- Born: Susan Lillian Mason; 1968 (age 57–58) Omaha, Nebraska, U.S.
- Party: Republican
- Education: University of Nebraska Omaha (BS); Creighton University (JD)

Susan Mason Bazis (née Mason; born 1968) is an American lawyer who has served as a United States district judge of the United States District Court for the District of Nebraska since 2024. She previously served as a United States magistrate judge of the same court from 2017 to 2024.

== Education ==
Bazis was born in 1968 in Omaha, Nebraska. She earned a Bachelor of Science, magna cum laude, from the University of Nebraska Omaha in 1990 and a Juris Doctor from Creighton University School of Law in 1993.

== Career ==
From 1991 to 2001, she was an associate at Paragas Law Offices in Omaha. From 1994 to 1996, she served as the assistant public defender in the Douglas County Public Defender's Office and from 1996 to 1999, she was an associate at Kelly, Lehan, & Hall, P.C. From 2001 to 2007, she was a solo practitioner. From 2007 to 2016, she served as a judge of the Douglas County Court including as the presiding judge from 2010 to 2013. In 2016, Governor Pete Ricketts considered appointing Bazis to the Nebraska Supreme Court, but nominated Judge Max J. Kelch instead. From January 1, 2017 to 2024, she served as a United States magistrate judge of the District of Nebraska.

=== Federal judicial service ===
In January 2023, U.S. Senator Deb Fischer recommended Bazis to the Biden administration to be a judge on the United States District Court for the District of Nebraska. On December 19, 2023, President Joe Biden announced his intent to nominate Bazis to serve as a United States district judge of the United States District Court for the District of Nebraska. Her nomination received support from Senators Deb Fischer and Pete Ricketts. On January 10, 2024, her nomination was sent to the Senate. President Biden nominated Bazis to the seat vacated by Judge John M. Gerrard, who assumed senior status on February 6, 2023. On January 24, 2024, a hearing on her nomination was held before the Senate Judiciary Committee. On February 29, 2024, her nomination was reported out of committee by an 18–3 vote. On April 8, 2024, the United States Senate invoked cloture on her nomination by a 68–18 vote. On April 9, 2024, her nomination was confirmed by a 78–21 vote. She received her judicial commission on April 10, 2024, and was sworn in on the same day.

Legal offices
Preceded by John M. Gerrard	Judge of the United States District Court for the District of Nebraska; 2024–present	Incumbent
