= Robert V. Denney =

American politician and judge (1916–1981)

Robert Vernon Denney
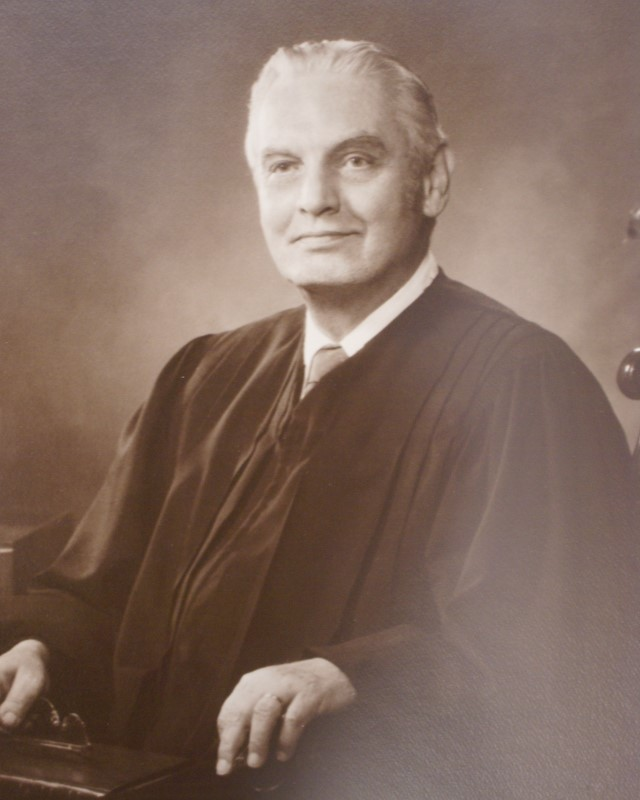

Senior Judge of the United States District Court for the District of Nebraska
- In office April 16, 1981 – June 26, 1981

Judge of the United States District Court for the District of Nebraska
- In office March 5, 1971 – April 16, 1981
- Appointed by: Richard Nixon
- Preceded by: Seat established by 84 Stat. 294
- Succeeded by: C. Arlen Beam

Member of the U.S. House of Representatives from Nebraska's 1st district
- In office January 3, 1967 – January 3, 1971
- Preceded by: Clair Armstrong Callan
- Succeeded by: Charles Thone

Personal details
- Born: April 11, 1916 Council Bluffs, Iowa, U.S.
- Died: June 26, 1981 (aged 65) Omaha, Nebraska, U.S.
- Party: Republican
- Education: Creighton University School of Law (LL.B.)

Robert Vernon Denney (April 11, 1916 – June 26, 1981) was an American politician and judge who served in the United States House of Representatives for Nebraska's 1st congressional district and federal judge of the United States District Court for the District of Nebraska. He was a member of the Republican Party.

== Education and career ==
Born in Council Bluffs, Iowa, Denney graduated from Fairbury High School in 1933. He attended Peru State Teachers College and the University of Nebraska from 1933 to 1936, and received a Bachelor of Laws from Creighton University School of Law in 1939. He practiced law in Fairbury, Nebraska from 1939 to 1940 and then became a special agent for Federal Bureau of Investigation from 1940 to 1941, serving in Washington, D.C., and Chicago, Illinois. He enlisted in the United States Marine Corps during World War II, in October 1942, with the First Armored Amphibian Battalion. He remained active in United States Marine Corps Reserve until 1960 and retired with rank of lieutenant colonel. Denney resumed the practice of law in Fairbury from 1945 to 1967, becoming Jefferson County attorney from 1946 to 1951 and Fairbury city attorney from 1951 to 1956. He was Chairman of the Jefferson County Republican Party, and then Chairman of the Nebraska Republican Party. He was elected to the Ninetieth and Ninety-first United States Congresses serving from January 3, 1967, to January 3, 1971. He did not run for reelection to the Ninety-second United States Congress.

== Federal judicial service ==
On January 28, 1971, Denney was nominated by President Richard Nixon to a new seat on the United States District Court for the District of Nebraska created by 84 Stat. 294. He was confirmed by the United States Senate on March 4, 1971, and received his commission on March 5, 1971. He assumed senior status due to a certified disability on April 16, 1981, serving in that capacity until his death on June 26, 1981, in Omaha, Nebraska. He was buried in Fairbury Cemetery, in Fairbury.

== Memberships ==
Denney was a member of the Presbyterian Church, the American Bar Association, the American Legion, Veterans of Foreign Wars, Phi Sigma Kappa, the Freemasons, Knights Templar (Freemasonry), the Shriners and the Lions.

== Honor ==
On December 23, 1981, the Robert V. Denney Federal Building and Courthouse in Lincoln, Nebraska was named by President Ronald Reagan.

== Sources ==
- "Denney, Robert Vernon". The Political Graveyard.
- Robert V Denney at the United States District Court - District of Nebraska*
- United States Congress. "Robert V. Denney (id: D000239)". Biographical Directory of the United States Congress. Retrieved on 2008-04-02

U.S. House of Representatives
Preceded by Clair Armstrong Callan	Member of the U.S. House of Representatives from Nebraska's 1st congressional district 1967–1971	Succeeded by Charles Thone
Legal offices
Preceded by Seat established by 84 Stat. 294	Judge of the United States District Court for the District of Nebraska; 1971–1981	Succeeded by C. Arlen Beam
