= Zanzye H.A. Hill =

Nebraska lawyer

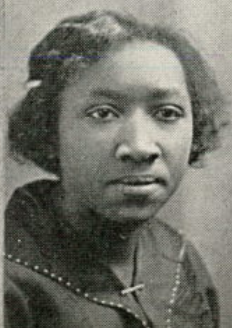
- Zanzye H.A. Hill, from the 1924 yearbook of Lincoln High School
- Born: January 12, 1906; Yazoo City, Mississippi
- Died: April 4, 1935 (aged 29); Yazoo City, Mississippi
- Occupation: Lawyer

Zanzye Herterzena A. Hill (January 12, 1906 – April 4, 1935) was Nebraska's first African American female lawyer.

== Early life and education ==
Hill was born in Yazoo City, Mississippi and raised in Lincoln, Nebraska, the daughter of Pinck M. E. Hill and Eliza Johnson Hill. Her older sister Brevy Hill Miller became a newspaper columnist; her younger sister XaCadene Hill Fox became a physician.

She graduated from Lincoln High School in 1924. She completed a bachelor's degree at the University of Nebraska in 1927. In 1929, Hill—whose poetry appeared in campus publications—became the University of Nebraska's first African American female law graduate. She was a member of the Alpha Kappa Alpha sorority chapter at NU, and the only Black member of the university vesper choir. She was also active with the Interracial Commission of the university YWCA.

== Career ==
Shortly after law school, Hill became the first African American woman admitted to practice law in Nebraska. She taught briefly at Tuskegee Institute, and worked as chief counsel for an Arkansas insurance company.

== Personal life and legacy ==
Hill died in 1935, in Mississippi, at the age of 29. She had been in poor health for some time, and was hospitalized for a surgery shortly before her death. Hill's achievements were recalled when Elizabeth Davis Pittman became the second Black woman was admitted to the Nebraska bar, in 1948. In 1982, Hill was one of the five historical Nebraskans honored during the state's first Women's History Week.

== See also ==
- List of first women lawyers and judges in Nebraska
