= Richard G. Kopf =

American judge (1946–2025)

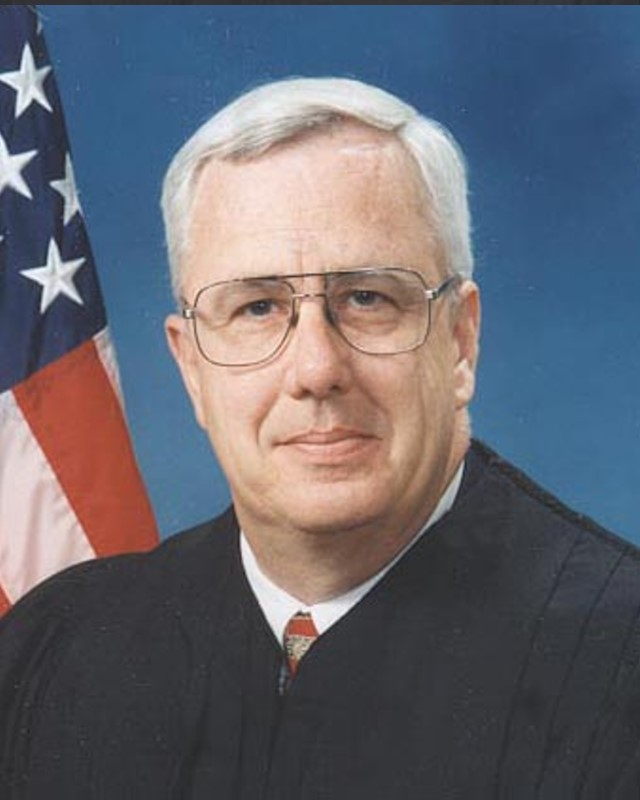

Senior Judge of the United States District Court for the District of Nebraska
- In office December 1, 2011 – January 17, 2025

Chief Judge of the United States District Court for the District of Nebraska
- In office 1999–2004
- Preceded by: William G. Cambridge
- Succeeded by: Joseph Bataillon

Judge of the United States District Court for the District of Nebraska
- In office May 26, 1992 – December 1, 2011
- Appointed by: George H. W. Bush
- Preceded by: Warren Keith Urbom
- Succeeded by: John M. Gerrard

Magistrate Judge of the United States District Court for the District of Nebraska
- In office 1987–1992

Personal details
- Born: Richard George Kopf; December 1, 1946 Toledo, Ohio, U.S.
- Died: January 17, 2025 (aged 78)
- Education: Kearney State College (BA); University of Nebraska–Lincoln (JD)

Richard George Kopf (December 1, 1946 – January 17, 2025) was a United States district judge of the United States District Court for the District of Nebraska.

== Background ==
Kopf received his Bachelor of Arts degree from Kearney State College in 1969, where he was a member of Phi Kappa Tau fraternity. He received his Juris Doctor from the University of Nebraska College of Law in 1972. He was a law clerk for Judge Donald Roe Ross of the United States Court of Appeals for the Eighth Circuit for two years following law school and then entered private practice in Lexington, Nebraska. In 1984, he served as counsel for the State of Nebraska in the impeachment of the Nebraska Attorney General.

Kopf died on January 17, 2025, at the age of 78.

== Federal judicial service ==
Kopf served as a United States magistrate judge of the United States District Court for the District of Nebraska from 1987 to 1992.

Kopf was nominated by President George H. W. Bush on April 7, 1992, to a seat on the United States District Court for the District of Nebraska vacated by Judge Warren Keith Urbom. He was confirmed by the United States Senate on May 21, 1992, and received commission on May 26, 1992. He served as chief judge from 1999 to 2004. He assumed senior status on December 1, 2011.

== Controversial opinions ==
Kopf received considerable press coverage for abortion-related decisions, particularly for his 474-page opinion striking down a ban on late-term abortions in Carhart, et al., v. Ashcroft. His decision included the apology "I apologize for the length of this opinion. I am well aware that appellate judges have plenty to do and that long-winded opinions from district judges are seldom helpful.... Nonetheless, I pity the poor appellate judge who has to slog through this thing. I am truly sorry."

In 2007 Kopf dismissed without prejudice a case over the use of the words "rape" and "sexual assault" in a rape trial in Lancaster County, Nebraska. Tory Bowen had filed a lawsuit against Judge Jeffre Cheuvront for violating her right to free speech in a rape trial; Kopf dismissed the suit because Bowen had not shown enough evidence to demonstrate her lawsuit was not frivolous. Cheuvront had barred the words "rape" and "sexual assault" from the trial, but allowed words such as "sexual intercourse" and "intercourse" to be used instead.

== Awards and honors ==
Kopf served as president and board chair of the historical society for the Eighth Circuit. He served as administrator of the Robert Van Pelt Inn of Court, a legal professional organization, until 2008; the organization gave Kopf its Warren Keith Urbom Mentor Award the same year.

== Personal blog ==
From 2013 to 2015, Kopf maintained a personal blog entitled Hercules and the Umpire: The Role of the Federal Trial Judge.

On August 8, 2013, Kopf published a blog, "Shon Hopwood and Kopf’s terrible sentencing instincts" relaying that he had given Hopwood a 12-year prison term for bank robbery, having then misjudged him as a "punk". Hopwood subsequently became a successful criminal attorney and a Georgetown University Law Center professor.

Kopf ended the blog after members of his courthouse staff indicated that it was an embarrassment to the court.

Legal offices
Preceded by Warren Keith Urbom	Judge of the United States District Court for the District of Nebraska; 1992–2011	Succeeded by John M. Gerrard
Preceded by William G. Cambridge	Chief Judge of the United States District Court for the District of Nebraska; 1999–2004	Succeeded by Joseph Bataillon
