= Joseph Bataillon =

American judge (born 1949)

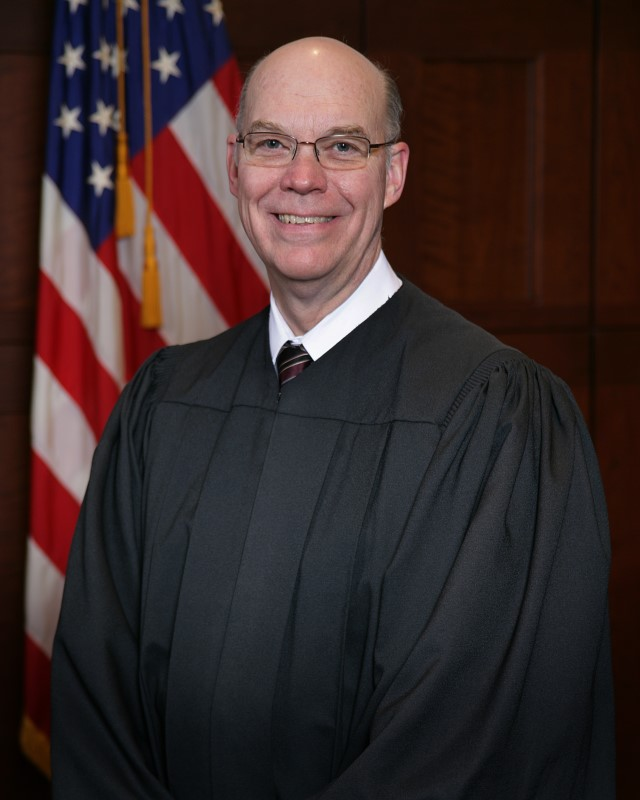

Senior Judge of the United States District Court for the District of Nebraska
- Incumbent
- Assumed office October 3, 2014

Chief Judge of the United States District Court for the District of Nebraska
- In office 2004–2011
- Preceded by: Richard G. Kopf
- Succeeded by: Laurie Smith Camp

Judge of the United States District Court for the District of Nebraska
- In office September 18, 1997 – October 3, 2014
- Appointed by: Bill Clinton
- Preceded by: Lyle Elmer Strom
- Succeeded by: Robert F. Rossiter Jr.

Personal details
- Born: Joseph Francis Bataillon; October 3, 1949 (age 76) Omaha, Nebraska, U.S.
- Education: Creighton University (BA, JD)

Joseph Francis Bataillon (born October 3, 1949) is a senior United States district judge of the United States District Court for the District of Nebraska.

== Education and career ==
Bataillon was born in Omaha, Nebraska. He received a Bachelor of Arts degree from Creighton University in 1971 and a Juris Doctor from Creighton University School of Law in 1974. Bataillon was a deputy public defender for Douglas County, Nebraska from 1974 to 1980. He was in private practice in Omaha from 1980 to 1997.

=== Federal judicial service ===
On January 7, 1997, Bataillon was nominated by President Bill Clinton to a seat on the United States District Court for the District of Nebraska vacated by Judge Lyle Elmer Strom. Bataillon was confirmed by the United States Senate on September 11, 1997, and received his commission on September 18, 1997. He served as chief judge from 2004 to 2011. He assumed senior status on October 3, 2014.

=== Notable case ===
In 2003-05, Bataillon heard Citizens for Equal Protection v. Bruning, a federal constitutional challenge to a voter initiative constitutional amendment that prohibited Nebraska from recognizing same-sex marriages or unions known as Nebraska Initiative Measure 416. In November 2005, Bataillon ruled that Initiative Measure 416 was unconstitutional under the Equal Protection Clause, the First Amendment, and the Contract Clause's prohibition on bills of attainder. In so doing, Bataillon became the first judge in the U.S. to invalidate a state marriage amendment defining marriage as between a man and a woman on federal constitutional grounds.

In July 2006, the United States Court of Appeals for the Eighth Circuit reversed Bataillon's decision on all three arguments and held that "laws limiting the state-recognized institution of marriage to heterosexual couples ... do not violate the Constitution of the United States."

In 2015, the Eighth Circuit's ruling was invalidated by the United States Supreme Court's decision in Obergefell v. Hodges.

== Personal life ==
Bataillon is married to Pam Bataillon, who ran for lieutenant governor of Nebraska in 1998.

== Sources ==
Legal offices
Preceded by Lyle Elmer Strom	Judge of the United States District Court for the District of Nebraska; 1997–2014	Succeeded by Robert F. Rossiter Jr.
Preceded by Richard G. Kopf	Chief Judge of the United States District Court for the District of Nebraska; 2004–2011	Succeeded by Laurie Smith Camp
