= Thomas L. Sloan =

Native American lawyer and activist

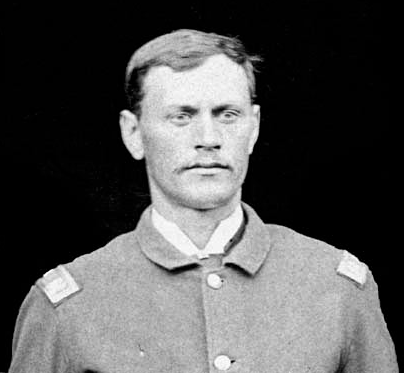
Thomas L. Sloan at Hampton Institute, c.1889

Thomas Louis Sloan (14 May 1863 – 10 September 1940) was a Native American lawyer and activist. Sloan worked alongside his partner, Hiram Chase, for much of his career. Sloan has a history of activism dating back to his teenage years. In 1911, he helped found the Society of American Indians. In addition, he established the first Indian-owned law office in Washington D.C. in 1912. Sloan was an activist for the citizenship of all Native Americans.

== Biography ==
Thomas Louis Sloan was born in St. Louis, Missouri on May 14, 1863. His father, William E. Sloan, was mixed race and his mother, name unknown, was a non-Indian. At a young age, he became an orphan and lived with his paternal grandmother, Margaret Sloan. Together they lived at the Omaha Indian Reservation in Nebraska, as his family was from the Omaha tribe. At the age of 17, Sloan and his future law partner Hiram Chase were deemed troublemakers and imprisoned in an agency blockhouse for protesting agents of cheating the tribe financially.

Both Sloan and Chase participated in the Peyote religion which Sloan originally opposed. Peyote was a combatant against alcoholism within the Omaha tribe and attracted the young and educated members of their tribe.

Under the Native American boarding school system started by General Richard Henry Pratt, Sloan was sent to the Hampton Institute in Virginia in 1886, at the age of 23, and graduated as valedictorian in 1889. Sloan was also a member of the Wigwam Council (a student governing body of the Native American Dorms) and the manager of "Talks and Thoughts", an Indian publication at the University. After graduating, he turned down a scholarship to Yale Law School, so he could go work as an Indian Agent for Nebraska while he studied law under Hiram Chase.

Before attending Hampton Institute, Sloan had also spent time enlisted in the U.S. Cavalry and served a tour in the Navy.

Sloan believed Native Americans could find the most protection through American Law, and he never gave up on his work until his death in 1940, at the age of 77. According to Eli Winkler, one of the reasons for Sloan's support of congressional acts, like the Dawes Act, advocation for working within the framework of the government, and support of and use of his "Indianness" came from his time at Hampton and what he was taught there.

== Career ==
=== Courts ===
Sloan practiced law under Hiram Chase after he graduated from Hampton; in 1891, they formed a law firm called "Chase & Sloan, Attorneys at Law". Sloan served in the government on the Omaha-Winnebago reservation until he moved back to practicing private law, working specifically on cases involving Native Americans. By 1911, Sloan appeared in federal courts regularly and also acted as a liaison helping tribal leaders navigate the government bureaucracy.

Sloan was admitted to the Nebraska State Bar in 1892. He was also admitted to the California State Bar in July 1926.

==== Supreme Court ====
He was the first Native American to argue a case in the Supreme Court. In 1894 and 1901, Congress passed an act that allowed Native Americans to use the Circuit Courts to claim allotments that they were entitled to, but had not been awarded. Sloan, H. C. Brome, Charles E. Clapp, and Anderson & Keefe represented 25 cases of people who claimed allotments from the Act of 1882. They were told they were ineligible, appealed and were still told that they would be unable to receive the allotments. This argument made its way to the Supreme Court. Titled John M. Sloan v. U.S., the appellants argued that they were entitled to their allotments due to the Act of 1882 and that it redefined eligibility for these allotments, taking the place of earlier acts. The U.S. argued that the case was not within the jurisdiction of the Supreme Court and moved to dismiss the claims. The case was decided against the appellants in 23 of 25 cases, and the opinion of the court was written by Justice Peckham. However, Thomas Sloan did successfully fight and gain his allotments despite initial rulings that he was ineligible because his grandmother had received allotments in 1830.

==== Peyote Trials ====
Thomas Sloan is best known for his involvement in a well-known court case attempting to prohibit the use of peyote. Sloan argued for its preservation because of its connection to his Indian religion on the basis of the effect that peyote had on drunken people. He argued that it removed the drunk man's desire to drink and the smoker's urge to smoke. He also reported that it was not addictive like with alcohol and tobacco. As further evidence, Sloan argued that the health risks allegedly associated to peyote derived from the tribe's medicine men, who opposed its use within the Omaha tribes. Sloan's strong defense of peyote led to some people fearing him, especially missionaries, and some worried that this would reflect negatively on the SAI.

Sloan served as an advisor and witness for Harry Black Bear who had been charged for the distribution of peyote. Originally the jury found Black Bear guilty, but his attorney appealed it to another judge who overturned the earlier decision. Black Bear's attorney and local press give Sloan's testimony credit for being the reason behind the judge's decision.

=== Government Involvement ===
==== Local Government ====
Sloan held many positions in the government: County surveyor of Thurston County (two terms), Federal court commissioner, and member of the village board of trustees in Pender, NE (elected twice). In 1901, Sloan was elected mayor of Pender, Nebraska.

Sloan worked as an Indian Agent, ensuring the Dawes Act was carried out properly in his district. During this time, disputes over land gave rise to tension between tribes and between Indians and whites.

==== Federal Government ====
Sloan was part of the Harding administration's "Advisory Council on Indian Affairs" or more commonly known as the Committee of One Hundred that advised the government on Native American affairs. It was the work of this committee that also helped provide the 1928 Meriam Report which provided much reliable information to the government about the state of Indians all over the country, specifically in the realm of education. In addition, this report would also inspire the 1934 American Reorganization Act.

Sloan was also nominated, in 1912, for the role of Commissioner of Indian Affairs, a position in the Bureau of Indian Affairs (BIA). However, Sloan's morality was largely called into question by The New Republic. They wrote a series of disputed articles accusing him of committing fraud. The articles claimed he convinced a woman to adopt a child to will her land to. In the dispute for the women's land Sloan allegedly advised both sides of the dispute (the adopted child and relatives who had formerly been in the will), that way he would gain money from either side winning. When the relatives won back their original inheritance, Sloan received a portion of it. The New Republic also accused Sloan of gaining his nomination through a secret alliance with Frederick Abbott. Sloan lost the bid for Commissioner to Cato Sells.

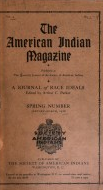
A photo of the magazine Sloan was Editor of.

=== Society of American Indians (SAI) ===
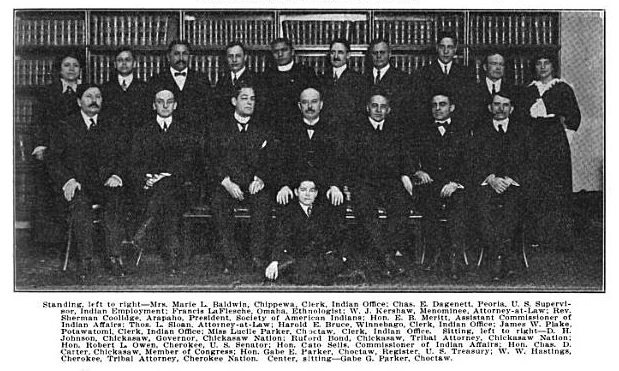
Thomas Sloan pictured at a Society of American Indians meeting, he is 3rd from the right standing up.

Sloan was one of the founding members of the Society of American Indians. He served as a member of its executive council and was its first vice president. Later, however, Sloan stepped down from his position as vice president in part due to some rumors about his past. Sloan was eventually named president of the organization, winning over Charles Eastman and Captain Raymond Bonin for the seat. Sloan was the Editor-in-chief of American Indian Magazine, and he supervised other well-known editors such as Clark Wissler, Frederick W. Hodge, and others. During WWI and after, Sloan and the other editors used the journal to advocate for Native American law reform and citizenship, similar to the ideas he had shared in the previously mentioned "Talks and Thoughts". In addition, they also worked alongside African American Peers like W.E.B DuBois in debates about racial uplift. Although Sloan and the other editors had high expectations for the journal, it would publish its last issue in August 1920.

According to Frederick E. Hoxie, Sloan retreated into the background of the Society for a time due to his aggressive nature.

Under Sloan's direction as president, the SAI began an aggressive lobby for Indian citizenship. This entrance into partisan politics was not supported by all members of the society, and a few resigned from their positions. Sloan continued his efforts with the plea that Native Americans did not have religious freedom; this was a claim no other president of the society had ever said. He remained optimistic for the Society until it was disbanded in 1923.

Sloan, and others in the SAI, believed that Native Americans could contribute greatly to American society through good Christian beliefs, and saw many tribal traditions as unrealistic for the modern world and were instead just something to be remembered. According to Laurence Hauptman, Sloan was heavily influenced by Dr. Carlos Montezuma in the aftermath of the Society of American Indians.

=== American Indian Federation (AIF) ===
Thomas Sloan was also a member and leader of the American Indian Federation. Sloan echoed the call of other members of the AIF to abolish the BIA and thought that the Indian Reorganization Act would fail. He testified during the House Committee on Indian Affairs' hearings on the subject in February 1935. Sloan argued that the only way for Indians to develop was for them to be able to handle problems on their without government supervision. He claimed that as long as the BIA existed that supervision would always exist.

After the Federation failed to overturn the IRA or abolish the BIA in the hearings, the organization splintered. A majority went on to support a new "Settlement Bill"; however, Sloan was among many of the original leadership of the AIF that opposed the bill.

=== Business ===
Eight years after the supreme court case Sloan v. US, as noted above, he opened a law office in Washington D.C., which was the first law firm owned by a Native American. Sloan poured a lot of effort in growing the firm. In the end, it represented individuals from many tribes, investigated certain reservations, and helped advise the councils of many tribes. Sloan pressured the government to prioritize helping the Indians instead of ignoring them or putting them off. He owned a flour mill.

== See also ==
- List of first minority male lawyers and judges in Nebraska
