= Hiram Chase =

American lawyer and Indigenous activist

Hiram Chase (Hiram John Hatu Mi Chase) (September 9, 1861 – December 3, 1928), was one of the first Native American Lawyers to argue before the U.S. Supreme Court, and with his partner Thomas L. Sloan, formed the first Native American law firm in the United States. Chase was a leader of the Society of American Indians, the first national American Indian rights organization run by and for American Indians. The Society pioneered twentieth-century Pan-Indianism, the philosophy and movement promoting unity among American Indians regardless of tribal affiliation.

== Early years ==
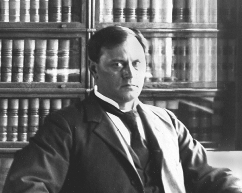
Hiram Chase

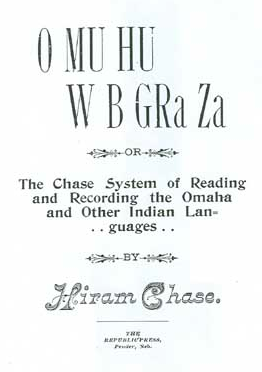

Hiram Chase born on the Omaha Reservation on September 9, 1861, in Macy, Thurston County, Nebraska. Chase was the great grandson of Omaha Chief Mohwoorgga. His father, Hiram Chase, Sr., was an interpreter and a post trader among the Omaha Indians, having come to Nebraska in 1854. Hiram attended mission schools on the Omaha Reservation in Nebraska until he was 15, then St. Stephen's Lutheran Academy in Zelienople, Pennsylvania, and Peru State College in Peru, Nebraska. Chase studied law at the Cincinnati Law School graduating with a Bachelor of Law degree, and in 1889 was the first Native American admitted to the bar in Nebraska. In 1892, Chase and fellow Omaha, Thomas L. Sloan, formed "Sloan & Chase, Attorneys-At-Law", the first Native American law firm in the United States. In 1893, Chase was elected County Judge of Thurston County, Nebraska, and served one term. In 1898, he was elected County Attorney and re-elected in 1901. Chase was the first to record the Omaha language on paper. In 1897. Chase wrote "O MU HU W B GRa Za: The Chase System of Reading and Recording the Omaha and Other Indian Languages." In 1884, Chase married Miss Cynthia Snyder and together they had seven children. Chase was involved in local community projects and a lifelong Freemason.

== Society of American Indians ==
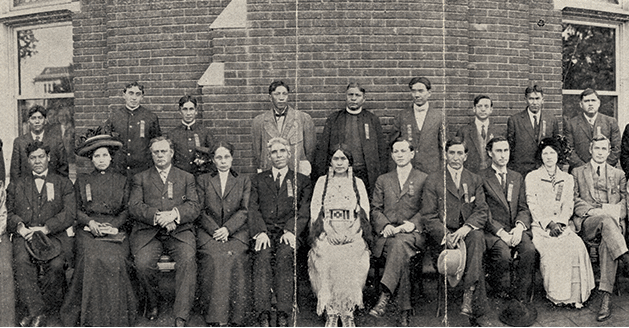
The Society of American Indians, Ohio State University, Columbus, Ohio, Inaugural Conference, 1911

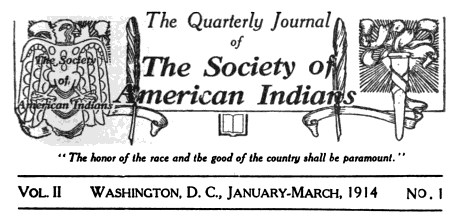
The Society of American Indians was the first national American Indian rights organization run by and for American Indians.

Hiram Chase was one of the early leaders of the Society of American Indians, the first national American Indian rights organization run by and for American Indians. The Society pioneered twentieth-century Pan-Indianism, the philosophy and movement promoting unity among American Indians regardless of tribal affiliation.

From October 12–17, 1911, the Society's inaugural conference was convened on the campus of the Ohio State University in Columbus, Ohio, symbolically held on Columbus Day as a fresh beginning for American Indians. Approximately 50 prominent American Indian scholars, clergy, writers, artists, teachers and physicians attended the historic event, and was reported widely by national news media. The Society was formally welcomed by university and city officials, and a personal address by the U.S. Commissioner of Indian Affairs, Robert G. Valentine.

Chase was elected to the Executive Committee along with Thomas L. Sloan, Rev. Sherman Coolidge, Arthur C. Parker, Charles Edwin Dagenett, Laura Cornelius and Henry Standing Bear. Chase addressed the conference on "The Law and the American Indian in the United States," arguing that the decisions of Chief Justice John Marshall and jurist James Kent were correct, that an Indian tribe occupying its own territory secured by treaties was a state with sovereignty over its domestic affairs, and that any other relationship was a violation of the U.S. Constitution." He noted that "a great amount of the natural ability of our people lies still dormant because of a lack of proper educational institutions" and "if we had been left to conduct our own affairs in the matter of progress and civilization, and not had left it to others that are based on false doctrines, our people would be on a higher plane of civilization today." Chase also attacked the Dawes Act allotment policy as fundamentally wrong. "I do not believe that the salvation of the Indian rests with the division of tribal lands into separate ownership and alienable titles, and the thrusting on him, while he is unprepared to receive them, of the rights and duties of citizenship."

== Peyote hearings ==
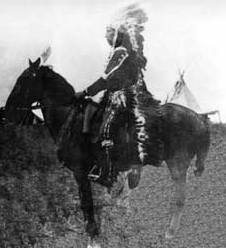
Hiram Chase

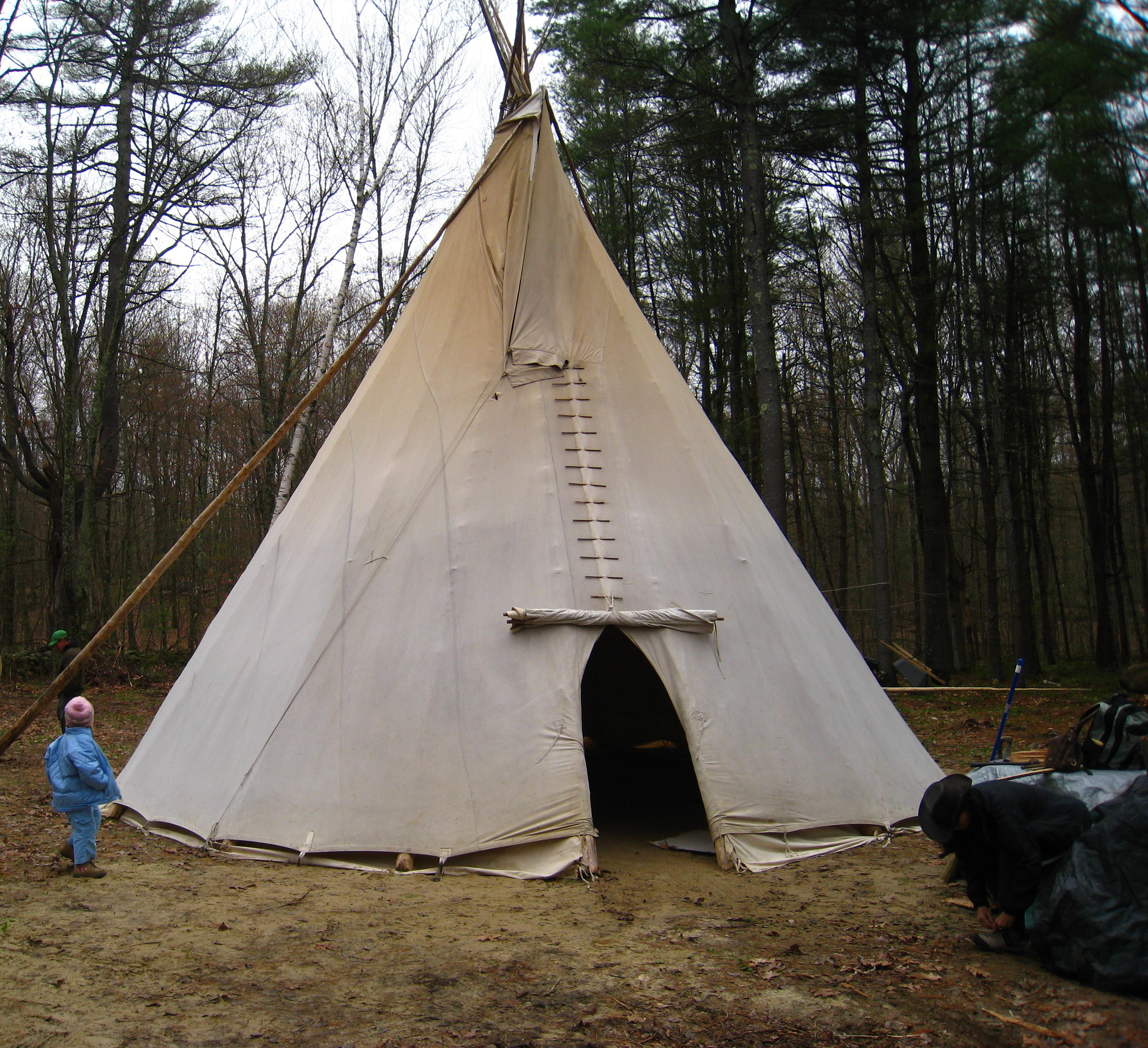
Peyote ceremony tipi

Chase was a supporter of the Peyote faith, and realized it combated alcoholism and attracted the younger, better educated, more acculturated Omaha. In 1906, a Christianized version of the religion was organized on the Omaha Reservation. By 1909, more than half the tribal members belonged, and in 1915 the church was reorganized as the Omaha Indian Peyote Society. Both Chase and Sloan were members. In February and March, 1918, prominent Society leaders argued both sides of the peyote issue before the U.S. Congress House Subcommittee on Indian Affairs on the "Hayden Bill", legislation proposed by Congressman Carl Hayden from Arizona to suppress liquor and peyote among Indians. Testimony against the use of peyote was given by Gertrude Simmons Bonnin and Charles Eastman, while supporters the peyote religion included Thomas L. Sloan, Francis LaFlesche, Cleaver Warden and Paul Boynton. In October 1918, in response to the Congressional hearings on the Hayden Bill, Carlisle Indian School alumni and other progressive leaders founded the Native American Church of Oklahoma Chase and Sloan, serving as lawyers for the Peyotists, asserted that the peyote religion was an "Indian religion" or the "Indian version of Christianity" and entitled to the Constitutional right to religious freedom. The Native American Church combined Indian and Christian elements, and was popular among the best-educated and most acculturated men among the Winnebago, Omaha and other tribes. By 1934, the Native American Church of Oklahoma was the most important Pan-Indian religious movement in the United States, and church leadership founded affiliated churches in other states. In 1945, the Native American Church in Oklahoma was incorporated as "The Native American Church of United States."

== Later years ==
Hiram Chase died in Chadron, Nebraska, on December 3, 1928, while visiting his daughter.
