= Reeman =

Reeman is a surname. Notable people with the surname include:

- Douglas Reeman (1924–2017), British author who used the pseudonym Alexander Kent
- Jops Reeman (1886–1959), Dutch soccer player
- Mohammed Reeman (born 1996), Saudi Arabian soccer player

== See also ==
- Freeman (surname)
- Reema
