= Lesley Woods Murphy =

American lawyer

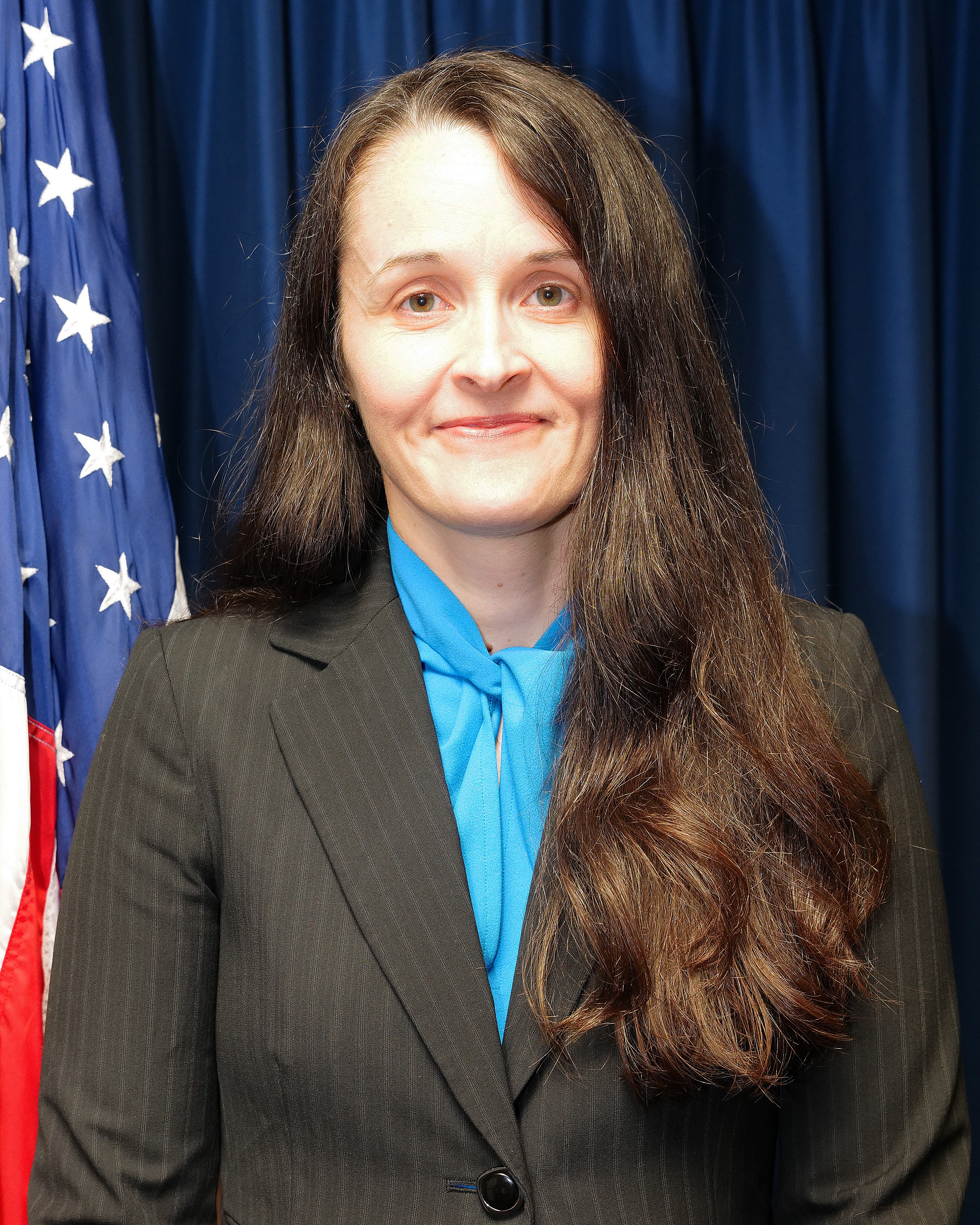

United States Attorney for the District of Nebraska
- Incumbent
- Assumed office May 6, 2025; Interim: May 6, 2025 - October 7, 2025
- President: Donald Trump
- Preceded by: Susan T. Lehr

Personal details
- Born: 1983 (age 42–43) Colorado Springs, Colorado, U.S.
- Education: University of Colorado; Metropolitan State College of Denver; University of Iowa College of Law

Lesley Woods Murphy is an American lawyer serving as the United States Attorney for the District of Nebraska.

On May 6, 2025, Murphy was nominated by President Donald Trump to be the United States Attorney for the District of Nebraska. She was confirmed by the U.S. Senate on October 7, 2025.

Legal offices
Preceded by Susan T. Lehr	United States Attorney for the District of Nebraska; 2025–present	Succeeded by Incumbent
