= William G. Cambridge =

American judge (1931–2004)

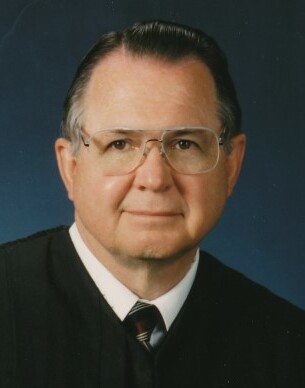

Chief Judge of the United States District Court for the District of Nebraska
- In office 1994–1999
- Preceded by: Lyle Elmer Strom
- Succeeded by: Richard G. Kopf

Judge of the United States District Court for the District of Nebraska
- In office June 6, 1988 – July 11, 2000
- Appointed by: Ronald Reagan
- Preceded by: C. Arlen Beam
- Succeeded by: Laurie Smith Camp

Personal details
- Born: William George Cambridge; December 13, 1931 Atlantic, Iowa
- Died: September 30, 2004 (aged 72) Omaha, Nebraska
- Spouse: Jean Cambridge
- Children: Karen and Elisa Cambridge
- Education: University of Nebraska (B.S.); University of Nebraska College of Law (J.D.)

William George Cambridge (December 13, 1931 – September 30, 2004) was a United States district judge of the United States District Court for the District of Nebraska.

== Education and career ==
Born in Atlantic, Iowa, Cambridge received a Bachelor of Science degree from the University of Nebraska in 1953, and a Juris Doctor from the University of Nebraska College of Law in 1955. He was in the United States Army from 1955 to 1957, remaining in the United States Army Reserve from 1957 to 1965. He was in private practice in Hastings, Nebraska, from 1957 to 1981. He was a district judge of the Tenth Judicial District of the State of Nebraska from 1981 to 1988.

== Federal judicial service ==
On April 13, 1988, Cambridge was nominated by President Ronald Reagan to a seat on the United States District Court for the District of Nebraska vacated by Judge C. Arlen Beam. Cambridge was confirmed by the United States Senate on May 27, 1988, and received his commission on June 6, 1988. He served as Chief Judge from 1994 to 1999, and retired from the bench on July 11, 2000.

== Death ==
He died on September 30, 2004, in Omaha, Nebraska.

== Sources ==
Legal offices
| Preceded by C. Arlen Beam | Judge of the United States District Court for the District of Nebraska; 1988–2000 | Succeeded by Laurie Smith Camp |
| Preceded by Lyle Elmer Strom | Chief Judge of the United States District Court for the District of Nebraska; 1994–1999 | Succeeded by Richard G. Kopf |
