= William B. Cassel =

American judge (born 1955)

William Cassel

Justice of the Nebraska Supreme Court
- Incumbent
- Assumed office April 26, 2012
- Appointed by: Dave Heineman
- Preceded by: John M. Gerrard

Personal details
- Born: William B. Cassel; September 20, 1955 (age 70) Ainsworth, Nebraska, US
- Party: Democratic (before 2012); Republican (2012–present)
- Education: University of Nebraska–Lincoln (BS, JD)

William B. Cassel (born September 20, 1955) is an American judge and lawyer. He is a justice of the Nebraska Supreme Court, representing Nebraska's Third Judicial District.

== Early life ==
Cassel was born on September 20, 1955 in Ainsworth, Nebraska. He received his Bachelor of Science from the University of Nebraska–Lincoln in 1977. He received a Juris Doctor cum laude and Order of the Coif from University of Nebraska College of Law in 1979. While in law school, he was an associate editor of the Nebraska Law Review.

== Career ==
Cassel established a private practice in Ainsworth, Nebraska from 1979 to 1992, while also serving as the city attorney for Ainsworth. From 1981 to 1992, he was also the city attorney of Johnstown, Nebraska and Long Pine, Nebraska. Cassel was a judge of the District Court, 8th Judicial District from 1992 to 2004. He was a judge of the Nebraska Court of Appeals, 3rd Judicial District, from 2004 to 2012.

Governor Dave Heineman appointed Cassel to fill a vacancy on the Nebraska Supreme Court on April 26, 2012. Cassel was elected to serve as the District 3 justice of the Nebraska Supreme Court in 2016 and again in 2022. His current term on the court ends on January 4, 2029.

Cassell is a fellow of the Nebraska State Bar Foundation and the American Bar Foundation.
