= Derek Vaughn =

American judge

Justice of the Nebraska Supreme Court
- Incumbent
- Assumed office November 10, 2025
- Appointed by: Jim Pillen
- Preceded by: Lindsey Miller-Lerman

Personal details
- Born: Derek Ray Vaughn
- Education: University of Nebraska–Lincoln (BS, JD)

Derek Ray Vaughn is an American lawyer who has served as an associate justice of the Nebraska Supreme Court since 2025.

== Early life, education, and legal career ==
Vaughn attended the University of Nebraska–Lincoln for his undergraduate degree, graduating in 1996 with a degree in business administration, and the University of Nebraska College of Law for his Juris Doctor, graduating in 1999.

In 2023, Nebraska governor Jim Pillen appointed Vaughn to serve as a Nebraska district court judge in the fourth judicial district in Douglas County, Nebraska.

== Nebraska Supreme Court tenure ==
On November 10, 2025, Governor Jim Pillen announced the appointment of Vaughn to the Nebraska Supreme Court to succeed Justice Lindsey Miller-Lerman, who retired. Vaughn made history as the first Black justice appointed to the Court.

Legal offices
Preceded by Lindsey Miller-Lerman	Justice of the Nebraska Supreme Court; 2025–present	Incumbent
