= Riko E. Bishop =

American judge (born 1956)

Judge of the Nebraska Court of Appeals
- Incumbent
- Assumed office July 19, 2013
- Appointed by: Dave Heineman
- Preceded by: Richard D. Sievers

Personal details
- Born: December 15, 1956 (age 69) Nagoya, Japan
- Education: Kearney State College (BA); University of Nebraska (JD)

Riko E. Bishop (born December 15, 1956) is a Japanese American lawyer who has served as a judge of the Nebraska Court of Appeals since 2013. She was appointed by Governor Dave Heineman.

== Early life and education ==
Bishop was born on December 15, 1956, in Nagoya, Japan. Bishop received her Bachelor of Arts in education and English from Kearney State College in 1977. She then taught English and creative writing at several schools, Elkhorn Junior High School from 1978 to 1980, Mission Junior High School from 1981 to 1983, and Bellevue Public Schools from 1983 to 1985 and worked for marketing firm Bader Rutter & Associates from 1986 to 1989 before attending law school. She later received her Juris Doctor from the University of Nebraska College of Law in 1992.

== Legal career ==
Following law school, from 1992 to 1993 Bishop served as judicial law clerk for Chief Judge Richard D. Sievers of the Nebraska Court of Appeals. She then served as an attorney with Perry, Guthery, Haase & Gessford law firm, doing general civil litigation and appeals. She had represented plaintiffs in personal injury, medical malpractice and employment law cases. In previous years, she has built a mediation practice within the firm, which she had been with for 20 years. During her time with the law firm, from 1998 to 1999 she served as an Adjunct Instructor at the University of Nebraska College of Law.

=== Nebraska Court of Appeals service ===
On July 19, 2013, Governor Dave Heineman appointed Bishop to be a Judge of the Nebraska Court of Appeals. She filled the vacancy created by the retirement of Judge Sievers.

=== State Supreme Court consideration ===
In July 2015, Bishop was considered for a seat on the Nebraska Supreme Court along with fellow candidates then-Judge Stephanie F. Stacy and attorney Amie C. Martinez. Governor Pete Ricketts ultimately chose Judge Stacy to replace retiring judge Kenneth C. Stephan.

== See also ==
- List of Asian American jurists

Legal offices
Preceded by Richard D. Sievers	Judge of the Nebraska Court of Appeals; 2013–present	Incumbent
