= Michael Heavican =

American judge (born 1947)

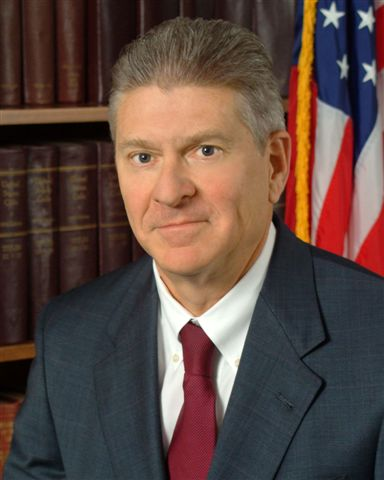

Chief Justice of the Nebraska Supreme Court
- In office October 2, 2006 – October 31, 2024
- Appointed by: Dave Heineman
- Preceded by: John V. Hendry
- Succeeded by: Jeffrey J. Funke

United States Attorney for the District of Nebraska
- In office 2001–2006
- President: George W. Bush
- Preceded by: Thomas Monaghan
- Succeeded by: Joe Stecher

Personal details
- Born: August 4, 1947 (age 79) Columbus, Nebraska, U.S.
- Party: Republican
- Education: University of Nebraska–Lincoln (BA, JD)

Michael G. Heavican (born August 4, 1947) is an American lawyer who served as the chief justice of the Supreme Court of Nebraska from 2006 to 2024.

== Early life and education ==
Heavican was born on August 4, 1947, in Columbus, Nebraska. Heavican received a Bachelor of Arts from the University of Nebraska–Lincoln in 1969, and received his Juris Doctor from the University of Nebraska College of Law in 1974.

== Career ==
Heavican's experience prior to joining the bench was exclusively as a state and then federal prosecutor. From 1975 to 1980, he was a Deputy Lancaster County Attorney. He became Chief Deputy Lancaster County Attorney in 1981, and then served as the Lancaster County Attorney from 1981 to 1991. He ran for Attorney General of Nebraska in 1990, but lost the Republican primary to Don Stenberg. In 1991, Heavican left state service to become an assistant United States attorney for the District of Nebraska. After ten years with that office, he was appointed by newly elected President George W. Bush to be the United States Attorney for the District of Nebraska in 2001, a position he held until becoming Chief Justice of Nebraska.

=== Nebraska Supreme Court ===
Heavican was appointed as chief justice of the Nebraska Supreme Court on October 2, 2006, by Governor Dave Heineman. Heavican retired on October 31, 2024.

=== Current ===
Heavican currently enjoys retirement by occasionally teaching a class at the University of Nebraska-Lincoln, returning to a familiar field as he briefly worked as a teacher at Papillion-La Vista High School in Omaha, Nebraska from 1969-1972.

Legal offices
Preceded by Thomas Monaghan	United States Attorney for the District of Nebraska; 2001–2006	Succeeded by Joe Stecher
Preceded by John V. Hendry	Chief Justice of the Nebraska Supreme Court; 2006–2024	Succeeded by Jeffrey J. Funke
