= Thomas J. Monaghan (attorney) =

American politician

United States Attorney for the District of Nebraska
- In office 1993–2001
- President: Bill Clinton
- Succeeded by: Mike Heavican

Personal details
- Education: Creighton University (B.A.); University of Nebraska–Lincoln (J.D.)

Thomas J. Monaghan is an American attorney who served as the United States Attorney for the District of Nebraska from 1993 to 2001.

== Early life and education ==
He received his bachelor's degree from Creighton University in 1969 and his J.D. from the University of Nebraska College of Law in 1972.

== Career ==
In 1993, President Bill Clinton nominated Monaghan to be the United States Attorney for the District of Nebraska. Following his time as the U.S. attorney, Monaghan served as the Director of the Department of Justice with the United Nations in Kosovo from 2004 until 2006.
