= C. Arlen Beam =

American judge (1930–2025)

Arlen Beam
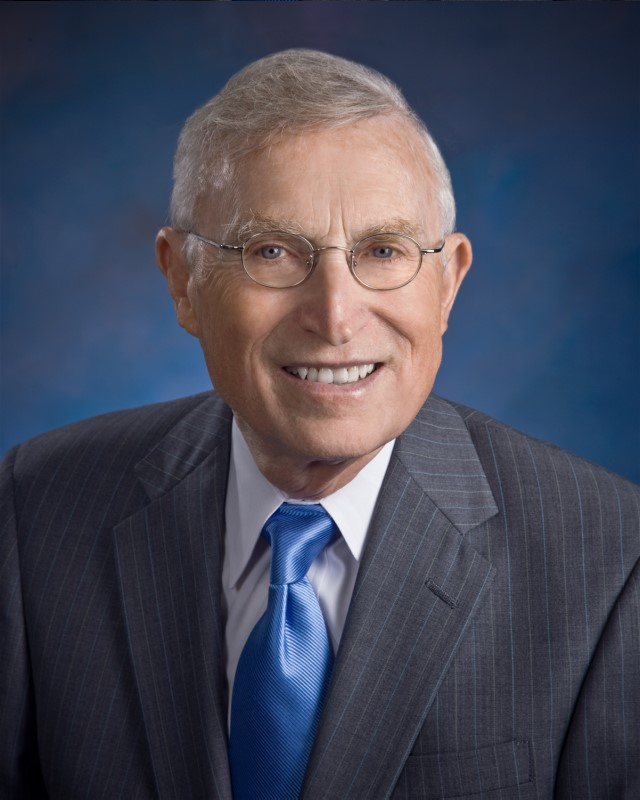

Senior Judge of the United States Court of Appeals for the Eighth Circuit
- In office February 1, 2001 – October 31, 2025

Judge of the United States Court of Appeals for the Eighth Circuit
- In office November 9, 1987 – February 1, 2001
- Appointed by: Ronald Reagan
- Preceded by: Donald Roe Ross
- Succeeded by: William J. Riley

Chief Judge of the United States District Court for the District of Nebraska
- In office 1986–1987
- Preceded by: Warren Keith Urbom
- Succeeded by: Lyle Elmer Strom

Judge of the United States District Court for the District of Nebraska
- In office November 18, 1981 – November 9, 1987
- Appointed by: Ronald Reagan
- Preceded by: Robert V. Denney
- Succeeded by: William G. Cambridge

Personal details
- Born: Clarence Arlen Beam; January 14, 1930 Stapleton, Nebraska, U.S.
- Died: October 31, 2025 (aged 95) Lincoln, Nebraska, U.S.
- Education: University of Nebraska (BS, JD)

Clarence Arlen Beam (January 14, 1930 – October 31, 2025) was a United States circuit judge of the United States Court of Appeals for the Eighth Circuit from 1987 to 2025 and a former United States district judge of the United States District Court for the District of Nebraska from 1981 to 1987.

== Education and career ==
Beam was born in Stapleton, Nebraska. He received a Bachelor of Science degree from the University of Nebraska in 1951, and was a captain in the United States Army during the Korean War from 1951 to 1953. He received a Juris Doctor from the University of Nebraska College of Law in 1965, and was thereafter in private practice in Lincoln, Nebraska until 1982.

== Federal judicial service ==
On October 14, 1981, Beam was nominated by President Ronald Reagan to a seat on the United States District Court for the District of Nebraska vacated by Judge Robert V. Denney. Beam was confirmed by the United States Senate on November 18, 1981, and received his commission the same day. He served as Chief Judge from 1986 to 1987. His service terminated on November 9, 1987, due to elevation to the court of appeals.

On July 1, 1987, Reagan nominated Beam to a seat on the United States Court of Appeals for the Eighth Circuit vacated by Judge Donald Roe Ross. Beam was confirmed by the Senate on November 6, 1987, and received his commission on November 9, 1987. He assumed senior status on February 1, 2001. Beam died in Lincoln, Nebraska on October 31, 2025, at the age of 95.

== Sources ==
Legal offices
Preceded by Robert V. Denney	Judge of the United States District Court for the District of Nebraska; 1981–1987	Succeeded by William G. Cambridge
Preceded by Warren Keith Urbom	Chief Judge of the United States District Court for the District of Nebraska; 1986–1987	Succeeded by Lyle Elmer Strom
Preceded by Donald Roe Ross	Judge of the United States Court of Appeals for the Eighth Circuit; 1987–2001	Succeeded by William J. Riley
