= Joe Stecher (attorney) =

United States Attorney

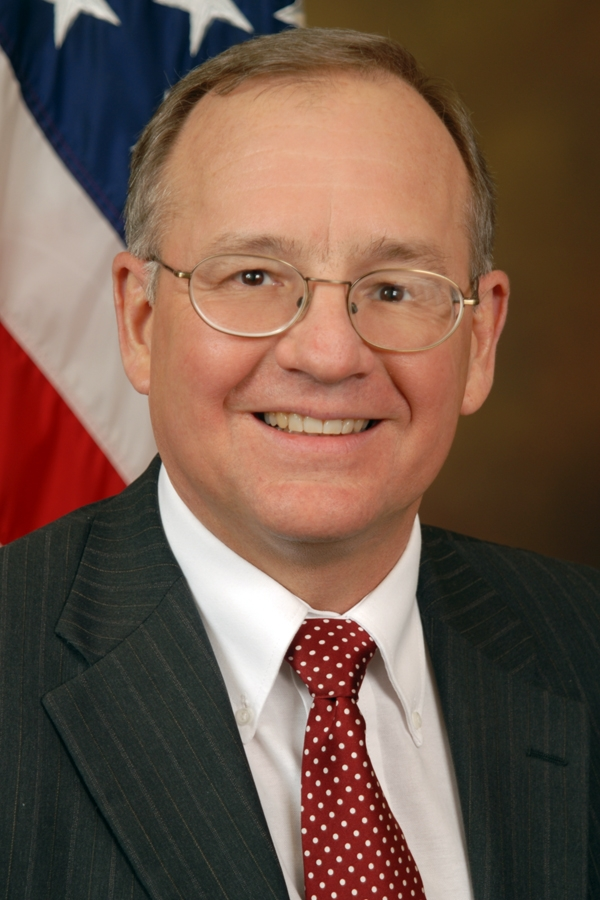

United States Attorney for the District of Nebraska
- In office August 1, 2007 – September 30, 2009
- President: George W. Bush; Barack Obama
- Preceded by: Mike Heavican
- Succeeded by: Deborah R. Gilg

Personal details
- Born: Omaha, Nebraska
- Party: Republican
- Education: Wayne State College (B.A.); University of Nebraska College of Law (J.D.)

Joseph Stecher is an American attorney who served as the United States Attorney for the District of Nebraska from 2007 to 2009.

== Early life and education ==
He received his bachelor's degree from Wayne State College and his J.D. from the University of Nebraska College of Law in 1983.

== Career ==
Stecher served as deputy county attorney and then as chief deputy county attorney. From 1999 to 2002 he was the Dodge County attorney.

Stecher also served as director of the Nebraska County Attorney's Association from 1996 to 2002.
