= Joe Kelly (Nebraska politician) =

American attorney and politician (born 1956)

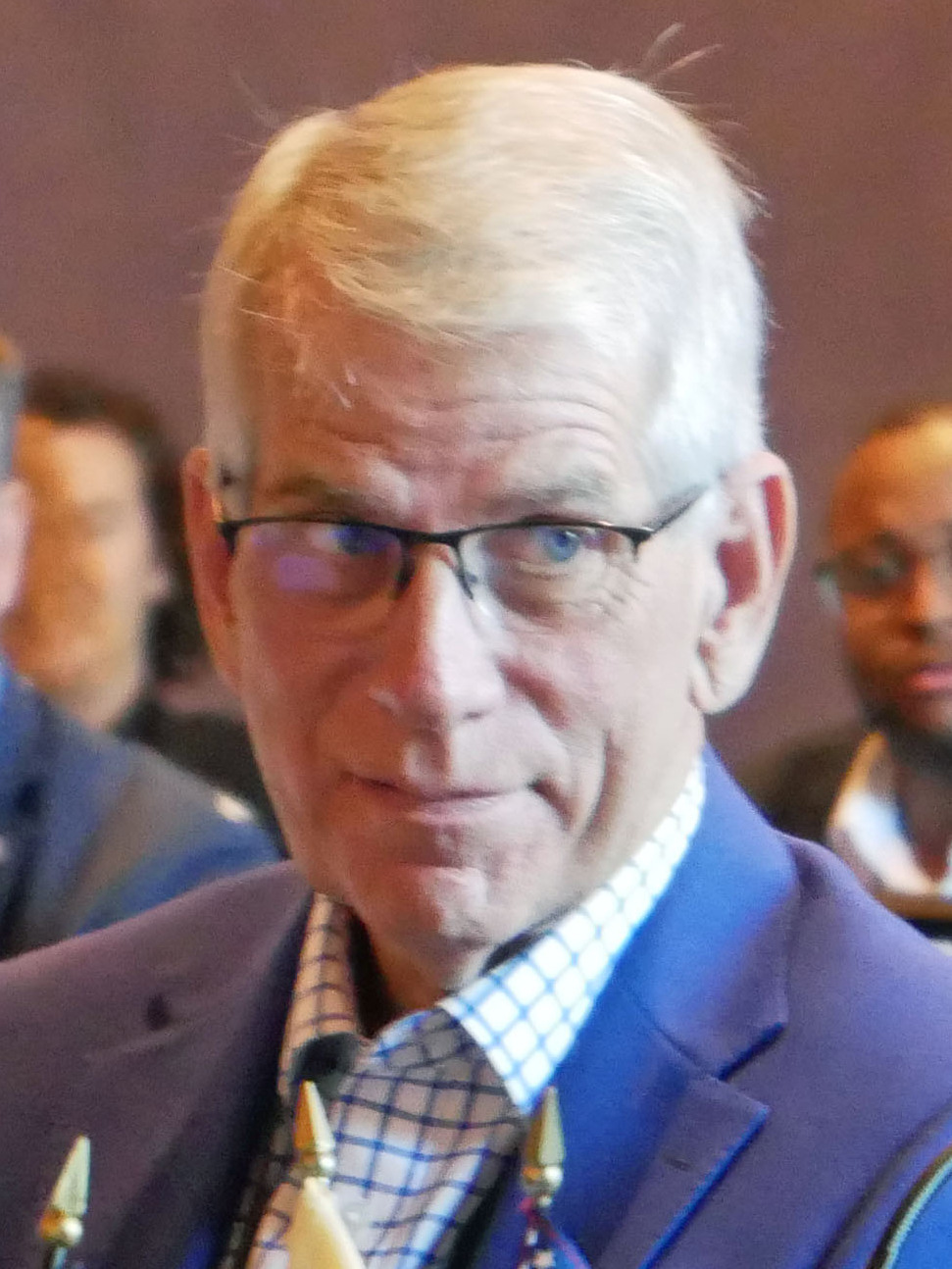
- Kelly in 2026

42nd Lieutenant Governor of Nebraska
- Incumbent
- Assumed office January 5, 2023
- Governor: Jim Pillen
- Preceded by: Mike Foley

United States Attorney for the District of Nebraska
- In office February 23, 2018 – February 28, 2021
- President: Donald Trump; Joe Biden
- Preceded by: Deborah R. Gilg
- Succeeded by: Jan Sharp (acting)

Personal details
- Born: Joseph Patrick Kelly; March 17, 1956 (age 70) Lexington, Nebraska, U.S.
- Party: Republican
- Education: University of Nebraska–Lincoln (BA, JD)

Joseph Patrick Kelly (born March 17, 1956) is an American attorney and politician who has served as the 42nd lieutenant governor of Nebraska since 2023. He served as the United States attorney for the District of Nebraska from 2018 to 2021. He formerly served as chief of the criminal division for the attorney general of Nebraska.

== Early life and education ==
Kelly earned a Bachelor of Arts degree from University of Nebraska–Lincoln in 1978 and a Juris Doctor from the University of Nebraska College of Law in 1981.

== Career ==
Kelly began his legal career in the Lancaster County Attorney's office from 1981 to 1985. He then served as an associate with Berniger, Berg and Diverin Colorado Springs, Colorado, from 1987 to 1990. He later returned to the Lancaster County Attorney's office as the deputy Lancaster County attorney. He was elected Lancaster County Attorney in 2010 and again in 2014. He has prosecuted a variety of crimes including homicide, robbery, sexual assault, and white collar.

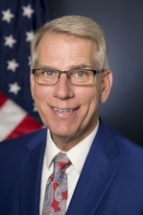
Kelly's official portrait as U.S. attorney

In 2018, he was appointed to be the U.S. Attorney for Nebraska by President Donald Trump. On February 15, 2018, his nomination to be a U.S. attorney was confirmed by voice vote in the U.S. Senate. He was sworn in on February 23, 2018. On February 8, 2021, he along with 55 other Trump-era attorneys were asked to resign. He resigned on February 28, 2021.

Following his time at a U.S. attorney, he served as Criminal Bureau Chief for the Nebraska Attorney General until Nebraska gubernatorial candidate Jim Pillen announced Kelly as his running mate in 2022. He was sworn in as Lieutenant Governor of the State of Nebraska on January 5, 2023.

Legal offices
Preceded by Deborah R. Gilg	United States Attorney for the District of Nebraska; 2018–2021	Succeeded by Jan Sharp; Acting
Party political offices
Preceded by Mike Foley	Republican nominee for Lieutenant Governor of Nebraska; 2022	Most recent
Political offices
Preceded by Mike Foley	Lieutenant Governor of Nebraska; 2023–present	Incumbent
