= Laurie Smith Camp =

American judge (1953–2020)

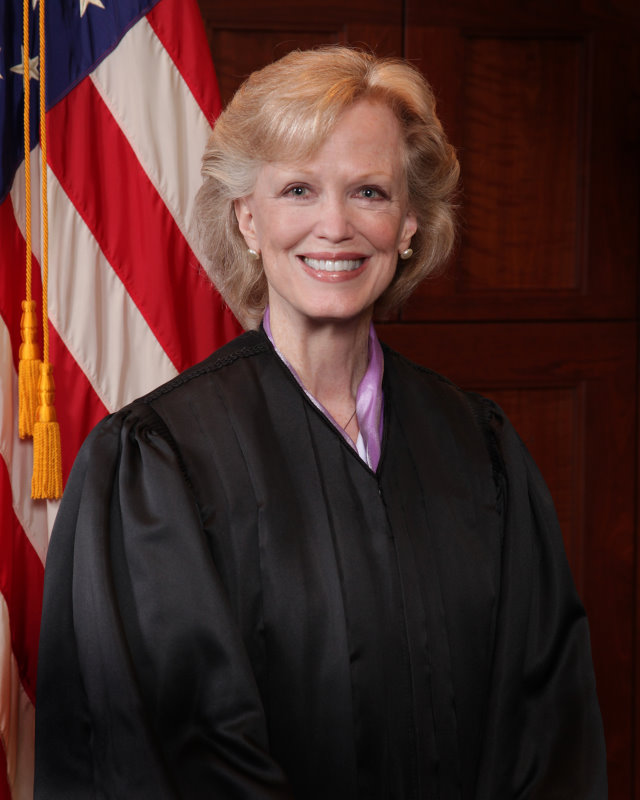

Senior Judge of the United States District Court for the District of Nebraska
- In office December 1, 2018 – September 23, 2020

Chief Judge of the United States District Court for the District of Nebraska
- In office December 1, 2011 – November 1, 2018
- Preceded by: Joseph Bataillon
- Succeeded by: John M. Gerrard

Judge of the United States District Court for the District of Nebraska
- In office October 24, 2001 – December 1, 2018
- Appointed by: George W. Bush
- Preceded by: William G. Cambridge
- Succeeded by: Brian C. Buescher

Personal details
- Born: Laurie Louise Smith; November 28, 1953 Omaha, Nebraska
- Died: September 23, 2020 (aged 66) Omaha, Nebraska
- Education: Stanford University (BA); University of Nebraska College of Law (JD)

Laurie Louise Smith Camp (November 28, 1953 – September 23, 2020) was a United States district judge of the United States District Court for the District of Nebraska.

== Early life and education ==
Born in Omaha, Nebraska, Smith Camp graduated from Stanford University with her Bachelor of Arts degree in 1974 and later from the University of Nebraska College of Law, where she earned her Juris Doctor in 1977.

== Legal career ==
Smith Camp started her legal career as an Associate General Counsel with the First National Bank & Trust Company from 1977 to 1978. She later was in private practice from 1978 to 1980. Later in 1980, she was employed as the General Counsel for the Nebraska Department of Correctional Services where she served until 1991. In 1991, Smith Camp became the Chief of the civil rights section for the Nebraska Department of Justice until 1995. She was a Chief Deputy Attorney General for criminal matters with the Nebraska Department of Justice from 1995 until her nomination to the federal bench in 2001.

== Federal judicial career ==
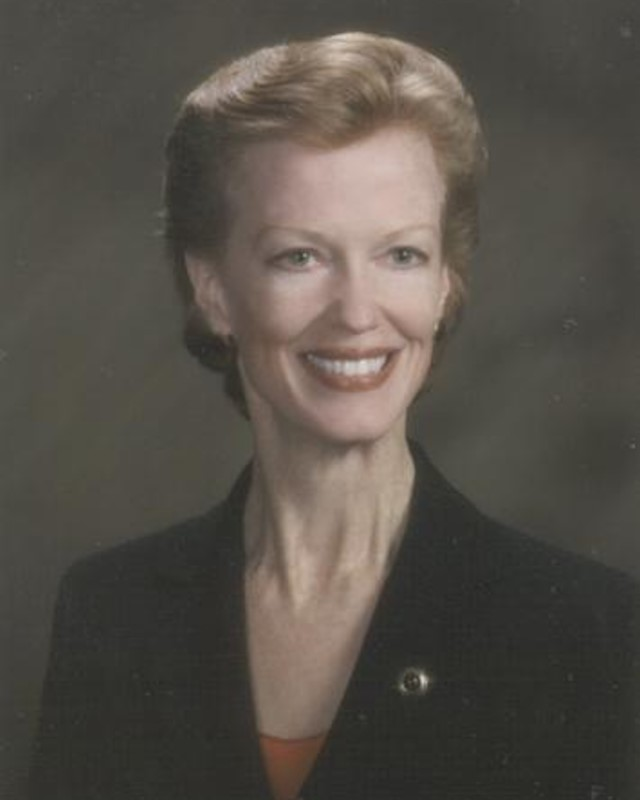

In 2001, Smith Camp was nominated to the United States District Court for the District of Nebraska by George W. Bush on September 4, 2001, to a seat vacated by William G. Cambridge. She was confirmed by the Senate on October 23, 2001, and received her commission the next day. She served as Chief Judge from December 1, 2011, to November 1, 2018. She assumed senior status on December 1, 2018. Her service terminated on September 23, 2020, due to her death.

== Sources ==
Legal offices
Preceded by William G. Cambridge	Judge of the United States District Court for the District of Nebraska; 2001–2018	Succeeded by Brian C. Buescher
Preceded by Joseph Bataillon	Chief Judge of the United States District Court for the District of Nebraska; 2011–2018	Succeeded by John M. Gerrard
