= Frankie J. Moore =

American judge

Chief Judge of the Nebraska Court of Appeals
- Incumbent
- Assumed office 2014

Judge of the Nebraska Court of Appeals
- Incumbent
- Assumed office January 28, 2000
- Appointed by: Mike Johanns

Personal details
- Education: Nebraska Wesleyan University (B.A.); University of Nebraska–Lincoln (J.D.)

Frankie J. Moore is the Chief Judge of the Nebraska Court of Appeals. She was appointed by Mike Johanns.

== Education ==
Moore earned her Bachelor of Arts from Nebraska Wesleyan University in 1980 and her Juris Doctor from the University of Nebraska College of Law in 1983.

== Legal career ==
Moore began her legal career in 1983 as an attorney in private practice in North Platte, Nebraska. She was in private practice until she joined the Nebraska Court of Appeals in 2000.

== Nebraska Court of Appeals service ==
She was appointed to the Court of Appeals by Republican Governor Mike Johanns and joined the court on January 28, 2000. Moore became chief judge in 2014.

Legal offices
Unknown	Judge of the Nebraska Court of Appeals; 2000–present	Incumbent
