= David Arterburn =

American judge (born 1957)

David K. Arterburn

Judge of the Nebraska Court of Appeals
- Incumbent
- Assumed office December 2016
- Appointed by: Pete Ricketts
- Preceded by: John Irwin

Personal details
- Born: June 13, 1957 (age 68)
- Education: York College (AA); University of Nebraska–Lincoln (BA, MA); University of Nebraska College of Law (JD)

David K. Arterburn (born June 13, 1957) is a Judge of the Nebraska Court of Appeals.

== Education ==
He received an Associate of Arts degree from York College in 1977. He received a Bachelor of Arts in 1978 and a Master of Arts in 1982 both from the University of Nebraska–Lincoln. He received his Juris Doctor from the University of Nebraska College of Law in 1985.

== Legal career ==
He served as an Assistant United States Attorney in the United States District of Nebraska and the Nebraska Attorney's office.

== State court service ==
Arterburn was one of nine people who submitted their name for a vacancy as a district judge of the 2nd Judicial District. He later served as judge of that court from 2005 to his appointment to the Court of Appeals.

== Nebraska Court of Appeals service ==
In December 2016 Governor Pete Ricketts appointed Arterburn to the Court of Appeals to the seat vacated by the retirement of Judge John Irwin. A formal investiture ceremony was held on February 10, 2017.

Legal offices
| Preceded by John Irwin | Judge of the Nebraska Court of Appeals; 2016–present | Incumbent |
