= Lindsey Miller-Lerman =

American judge (born 1947)

Justice of the Nebraska Supreme Court
- In office September 23, 1998 – October 31, 2025
- Appointed by: Ben Nelson
- Preceded by: Nick Caporale
- Succeeded by: Derek Vaughn

Judge of the Nebraska Court of Appeals
- In office February 1, 1992 – September 23, 1998
- Preceded by: Position established
- Succeeded by: Theodore Carlson

Personal details
- Born: Lindsey Gale Miller; July 30, 1947 (age 79) Los Angeles, California, U.S.
- Party: Democratic
- Children: 2
- Education: Wellesley College (BA); Columbia University (JD)

Lindsey Gale Miller-Lerman (born July 30, 1947) is a former justice of the Nebraska Supreme Court, appointed by Governor Ben Nelson in 1998. She was the first woman to serve on the court. Miller-Lerman was retained in 2014 and 2020; she retired on October 31, 2025.

== Early life ==
Miller-Lerman was born in Los Angeles, California, to father Avy Miller, an engineer who founded Laars-Engineers (which is now called Laars Heating Systems), and Roberta Miller (née Levey).

She received a Bachelor of Arts with honors from Wellesley College in 1968, where she was a classmate of Hillary Clinton. She and Clinton were both political science majors.

After graduating from Wellesley, Miller-Lerman worked at a Cleveland legal aid clinic. She obtained a Juris Doctor from Columbia Law School in 1973 and an Honorary Doctorate from the College of St. Mary in 1993.

== Career ==
From 1973 to 1975, Miller-Lerman clerked for Judge Constance Baker Motley, a United States District Judge for the Southern District of New York. After this time, Miller-Lerman and her husband moved from New York to Nebraska.

=== Private practice ===
In 1976, Miller-Lerman joined the law firm of Kutak Rock & Huie, now Kutak Rock. From 1976 to 1979, Miller-Lerman was an associate; from 1980 to 1992, she was a partner. She was at Kutak Rock until her appointment to the Nebraska Court of Appeals. Miller-Lerman worked part-time as a partner at Kutak Rock while she raised her children. This part-time agreement did not penalize Miller-Lerman's chances for promotion, which Miller-Lerman credited to senior partner Bob Kutak's influence. Her regular schedule was three days a week, but since Miller-Lerman specialized in litigation, her schedule was adjusted when she had cases that went to court.

=== Judgeship ===
In 1992, Miller-Lerman was appointed as a judge in the Nebraska Court of Appeals. She was the first woman in the state to serve on a court higher than the district court. After four years on the Nebraska Court of Appeals, Miller-Lerman became Chief Judge, a position she held from 1995 to 1998.

In 1998, Miller-Lerman took office as a Nebraska Supreme Court Judge for District 2, replacing retiring Judge D. Nick Caporale. She was retained in office in 2002 and 2008.

==== Notable cases ====
- Keystone Pipeline
- Voting rights for former felons - Miller-Lerman joined a 5-2 decision in 2024 ruling that the Nebraska Secretary of State must allow former felons to register to vote.

== Other ==
In 1993, Miller-Lerman's name was mentioned as being under consideration in the selection process for United States Attorney General during Bill Clinton's presidency. Senator J. James Exon was one of her supporters. Janet Reno was eventually selected for the position.

In 2026, a portrait of her was placed in the Nebraska State Capitol’s “Lawyers Room”, making her the first woman to have a portrait there.

== Publication ==
Miller-Lerman has been published in the following journals: Creighton Law Review; Litigation News & Notes; ABA Journal; The National Law Journal; Columbia Law Review; Wisconsin Law Review; Annals of Internal Medicine.

== Personal life ==
Miller-Lerman was a member of the United States 1961 Maccabiah Games swimming team in Israel, where she won two gold medals and one silver medal.

In 1969, Miller-Lerman married Dr. Stephen Lerman. They had 2 children. The marriage ended in divorce.

== See also ==
- List of female state supreme court justices

Legal offices
Preceded by Nick Caporale	Justice of the Nebraska Supreme Court; 1998–2025	Succeeded by Derek Vaughn
