= Michael W. Pirtle =

American judge

Judge of the Nebraska Court of Appeals
- Incumbent
- Assumed office July 6, 2011
- Appointed by: Dave Heineman
- Preceded by: Theodore Carlson

Personal details
- Born: February 22, 1953 (age 73); Houston, Texas
- Education: Midland University (B.A.); University of Nebraska College of Law (J.D.)

Michael W. Pirtle (born February 22, 1953) is a Judge of the Nebraska Court of Appeals.

== Education ==
Pirtle earned his Bachelor of Arts in business from Midland University in 1975 and his Juris Doctor from the University of Nebraska College of Law in 1978.

== Legal career ==
Pirtle joined the law firm of Gross & Welch in 2006 and served as its director until his appointment to the Nebraska Court of Appeals in 2011. Prior to that, he worked as a senior staff attorney for American Family Insurance from 2000 to 2006 and as an associate and partner with the Omaha firms of Walentine, O’Toole, McQuillan, & Gordon from 1986 to 2000, and McCormack, Cooney, Mooney, & Hillman from 1979 to 1986. From 1978 to 1979, Pirtle was an associate with Noren & Burns in Lincoln. Since 2011, Pirtle has served as chair of the Nebraska Supreme Court Dispute Resolutions Advisory Council.

== Nebraska Court of Appeals service ==
He was appointed by Governor Dave Heineman on June 24, 2011 to fill the seat left vacant by the death of Judge Theodore Carlson on April 16, 2011.

Legal offices
Preceded by Theodore Carlson	Judge of the Nebraska Court of Appeals; 2011–present	Incumbent
