= Deborah R. Gilg =

American attorney (1951–2022)

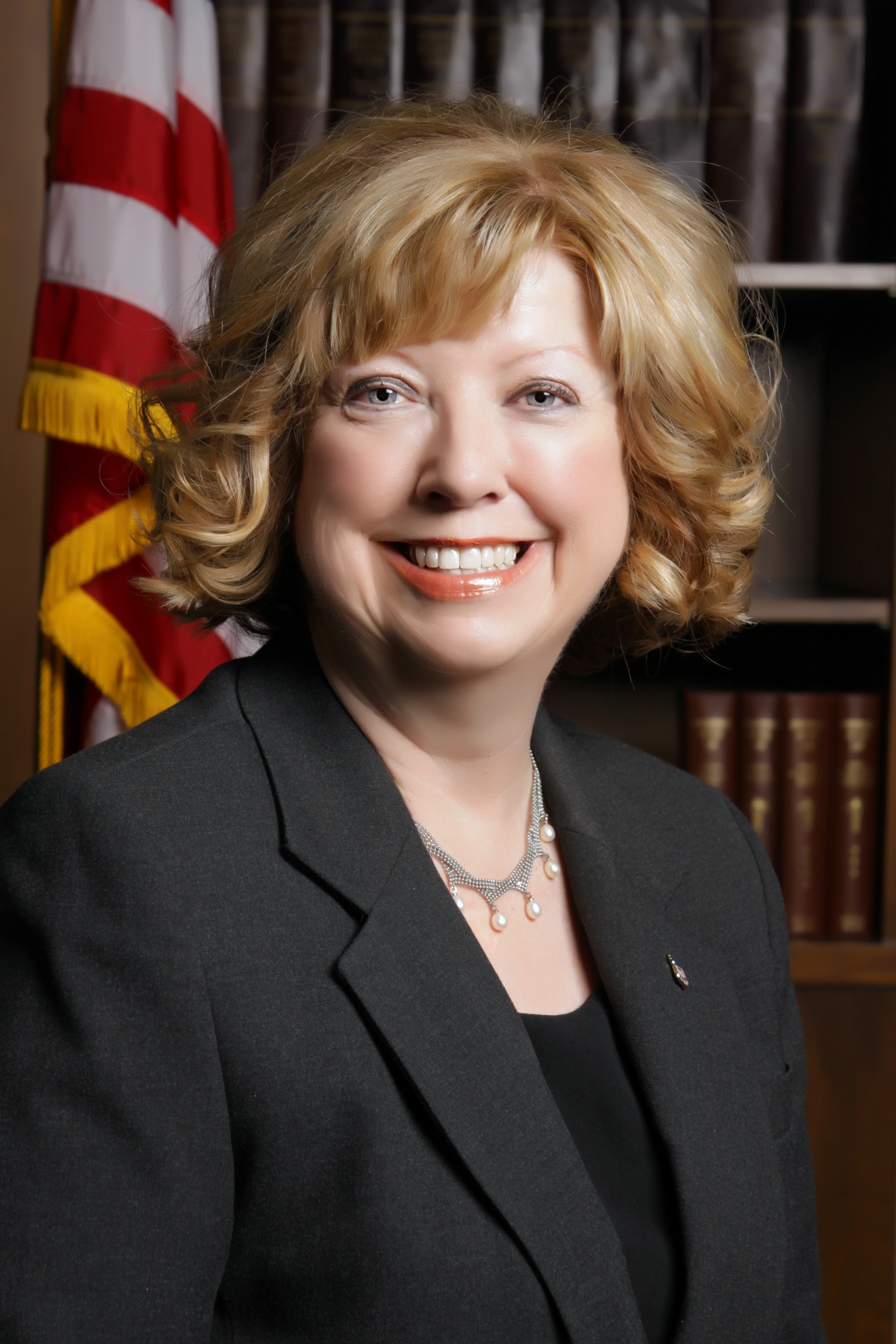

United States Attorney for the District of Nebraska
- In office October 1, 2009 – March 10, 2017
- President: Barack Obama; Donald Trump
- Preceded by: Joe Stecher
- Succeeded by: Joe Kelly

Personal details
- Born: December 15, 1951; Omaha, Nebraska, U.S.
- Died: November 16, 2022 (aged 70); Omaha, Nebraska, U.S.
- Political party: Democratic
- Education: University of Nebraska–Lincoln (BA, JD)

Deborah R. Gilg (December 15, 1951 – November 16, 2022) was an American attorney who served as the United States Attorney for the District of Nebraska from 2009 to 2017. Appointed on October 1, 2009, she was the first female US Attorney for Nebraska.

Prior to her appointment, Gilg served as an elected county attorney in Western Nebraska for 16 years. In recognition of her expertise as a prosecutor, she was appointed as a deputy county attorney or Special Prosecutor in over 21 counties in Nebraska, in addition to maintaining a private law practice.

== Early life and education ==
Gilg was born on December 15, 1951, in Omaha, Nebraska. She received her Bachelor of Arts and Juris Doctor from the University of Nebraska–Lincoln.

== Death ==
Gilg died on November 16, 2022, at the age of 70 after a short battle with colon cancer.

== See also ==
- 2017 dismissal of U.S. attorneys
