= Donald Roe Ross =

American judge (1922–2013)

Donald Ross

Senior Judge of the United States Court of Appeals for the Eighth Circuit
- In office June 13, 1987 – December 18, 2013

Judge of the United States Court of Appeals for the Eighth Circuit
- In office December 12, 1970 – June 13, 1987
- Appointed by: Richard Nixon
- Preceded by: Harry Blackmun
- Succeeded by: C. Arlen Beam

Personal details
- Born: Donald Roe Ross; June 8, 1922 Orleans, Nebraska
- Died: December 18, 2013 (aged 91) Omaha, Nebraska
- Party: Republican
- Education: University of Nebraska College of Law (JD)

Donald Roe Ross (June 8, 1922 – December 18, 2013) was a United States circuit judge of the United States Court of Appeals for the Eighth Circuit.

== Education and career ==
Born in Orleans, Nebraska, Ross was in the United States Army as an Air Corps Major from 1942 to 1946. He received a Juris Doctor from the University of Nebraska College of Law in 1948. He was in private practice in Lexington, Nebraska from 1948 to 1953. He was a Republican Executive Committeeman in the state of Nebraska from 1952 to 1953 when he became Mayor of Lexington. Ross was the United States Attorney for the District of Nebraska from 1953 to 1956 and was in private practice in Omaha, Nebraska from 1956 to 1970. He was general counsel for the Republican Party of Nebraska from 1956 to 1958. He served as a Committeeman from Nebraska to the Republican National Committee from 1958 to 1970 and was Vice Chairman for his delegation from 1965 to 1970.

== Federal judicial service ==
On November 30, 1970, Ross was nominated by President Richard Nixon to a seat on the United States Court of Appeals for the Eighth Circuit vacated by Judge Harry Blackmun. He was confirmed by the United States Senate on December 11, 1970, and received his commission on December 12, 1970. He assumed senior status on June 13, 1987, and died following an illness at his home in Omaha on December 18, 2013.

== See also ==
- List of United States federal judges by longevity of service

== Sources ==
Legal offices
Preceded by Harry Blackmun	Judge of the United States Court of Appeals for the Eighth Circuit; 1970–1987	Succeeded by C. Arlen Beam
