= Creighton University School of Law =

Private law school in Omaha, Nebraska, US

Coordinates: 41°15′51″N 95°56′40″W

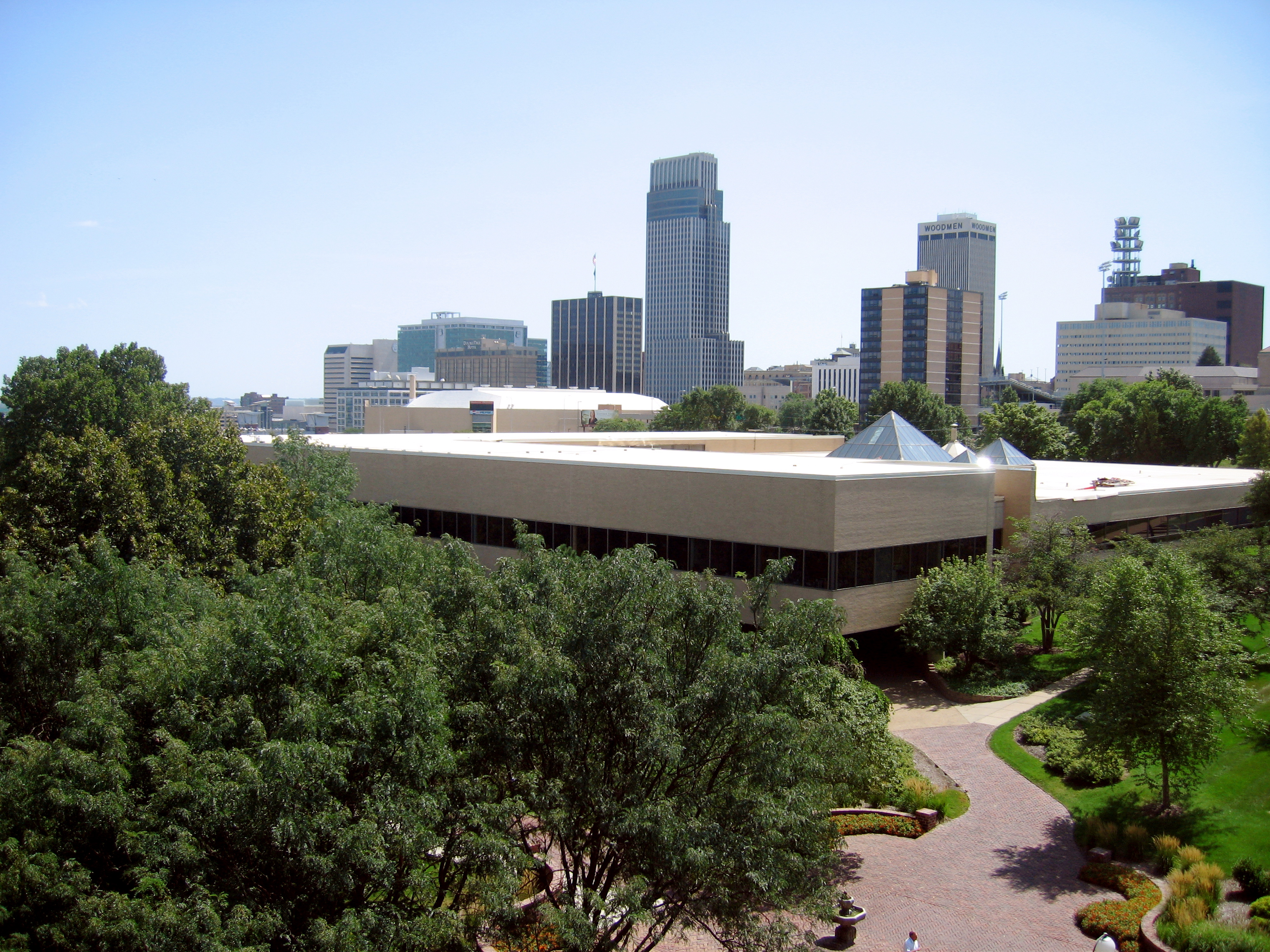
- Established: 1904
- School type: Private
- Dean: Joshua Fershee
- Location: Omaha, Nebraska, United States
- Enrollment: 294
- Faculty: 28 (full-time); 42 (part-time)
- USNWR ranking: 153rd (tie) (2024)
- Bar pass rate: 83% (for first-time bar exam takers in 2018)
- Website: www.creighton.edu/law/

Creighton University School of Law, located in Omaha, Nebraska, United States, is part of the Jesuit Creighton University.

== History ==
The School of Law was founded in 1904 as a joint project with the Omaha Bar Association, with Timothy J. Mahoney as the first dean. It was housed in the Edward Creighton Institute on S. 18th Street until 1921, when it moved to new quarters on the Creighton campus.

The law school was accredited by the American Bar Association in 1924.

Paul E. McGreal, J.D. LLM, served as the law school's dean from 2015 through July 2017. Joshua P. Fershee was named the school's 11th dean in 2019 after serving two years as interim dean.

== Admissions ==
The middle 50% range of LSAT scores of the full-time Fall 2018 entering class was 150–156. In this class, the male to female ratio is 51 percent to 49 percent, respectively. 19 percent of this class is a minority.

== Programs ==
The majority of Creighton School of Law students are enrolled in a full-time Juris Doctor program, which takes three years to complete. A growing number of students are enrolled in the Accelerated JD program, which takes two years to complete. A small portion of the student body is enrolled in a part-time JD program, which takes approximately four years to complete.

=== Concentrations and joint degrees ===
Creighton School of Law offers six certificates and four joint degrees. The certificates are Health Law, Family Law, Business, Commercial and Tax Law; Criminal Law and Procedure, International and Comparative Law, and Litigation. The joint degree programs include the law 3/3 program with its BSBA/JD degree (the completion of an undergraduate degree and a JD in six years instead of seven), the MBA/JD degree, the JD/MS in Government Organization and Leadership (GOAL), and the JD/MS in Negotiation and Conflict Resolution.

=== Clinics ===
Creighton operates the Milton R. Abrahams Clinic, which offers free legal assistance on civil matters to low-income residents of Douglas County. Starting in the Fall of 2017, the Creighton Immigrant and Refugee Clinic, housed within the Milton R. Abrahams Clinic, offers support to immigrants and refugees and is run in cooperation with the Immigrant Legal Center (formerly known as Justice for Our Neighbors).

=== Activities ===
Creighton's Law Review is published four times annually. Students are selected based on class standing or writing ability to work on the Law Review during their second and third years. The Creighton International and Comparative Law Journal (CICLJ) is an online publication founded in 2010 that serves as a forum for debate and exploration of international legal issues. It also provides students with the opportunity to refine their research, writing, and critical-thinking skills to create articles.

The Moot Court team at Creighton has received recognition for winning several regional and national competitions.

== Employment ==
According to Creighton's official 2019 ABA-required disclosures, 75% of the Class of 2019 obtained full-time, long-term, JD-advantaged or JD-required employment nine months after graduation. This employment rate was a reduction from 2017, when nearly 88% of the Class of 2017 obtained full-time, long-term, JD-advantaged or JD-required employment nine months after graduation. Creighton's Law School Transparency under-employment score is 5%, indicating the percentage of the Class of 2017 unemployed, pursuing an additional degree, or working in a non-professional, short-term, or part-time job nine months after graduation.

== Costs ==
The total cost of attendance (including tuition, fees, living expenses, and more) at Creighton University School of Law for the 2025–2026 academic year was $92,514.

== Notable events ==
Supreme Court Justice Clarence Thomas has co-taught a short course on constitutional law with professor G. Michael Fenner. The last one was in February 2019.

Once a year, the Nebraska Supreme Court holds session at Creighton University School of Law. The United States Court of Appeals for the Eighth Circuit heard oral arguments at the law school in November 2019.

A poverty law program was launched in 2017.

== Notable alumni ==
- Laura Duffy, former United States Attorney for the Southern District of California
- Brad Ashford, former member of the Nebraska Legislature, former member of the United States House of Representatives
- Frank A. Barrett, former Governor of Wyoming
- Patrick Bourne, former member of the Nebraska Legislature
- Joseph Bataillon, United States District Judge for the District of Nebraska
- Susan M. Bazis, United States District Judge, District of Nebraska
- John Joseph Cavanaugh III, former member of the United States House of Representatives
- Ernie Chambers, member of the Nebraska Legislature
- William M. Connolly, former Nebraska Supreme Court Justice
- Robert Vernon Denney, former member of the United States House of Representatives and US District Judge for the District of Nebraska.
- Mike Johanns, Member of the United States Senate, former Governor of Nebraska and former United States Secretary of Agriculture
- Steve Lathrop, former member of the Nebraska Legislature
- Ray Madden, former member of the United States House of Representatives
- Cheryl L. Mason — Chairman of the Board of Veterans' Appeals, US Department of Veterans’ Affairs (first woman appointed to the position)
- Francis P. Matthews, former United States Secretary of the Navy
- Michael McCormack, former Nebraska Supreme Court Justice
- John McKay, former United States Attorney
- Frederick Messmore, Justice of the Nebraska Supreme Court
- Henry Monsky, Omaha attorney
- Eugene O'Sullivan, former member of the United States House of Representatives
- Robert W. Pratt, District Judge for the United States District Court for the Southern District of Iowa
- Mike Reasoner, former member of the Iowa House of Representatives
- Robert F. Rossiter Jr., Chief United States District Judge for the District of Nebraska
- Clair Roddewig, 14th Attorney General of South Dakota
- Matt Schultz, Council Bluffs, Iowa City Council, former Iowa Secretary of State
- Robert L. Smith (1918–1999), Associate Justice of the Nebraska Supreme Court
- Lyle Elmer Strom, District Judge for the United States District Court for the District of Nebraska
- Doug Struyk, member of the Iowa House of Representatives
- Lee Terry, former member of the United States House of Representatives
- Ginni Thomas, wife of Supreme Court Justice Clarence Thomas

== See also ==
- List of law schools in the United States
