= Nebraska Court of Appeals =

Intermediate court of appeal of Nebraska

- State Seal of Nebraska
- Established: 1991
- Jurisdiction: Nebraska
- Location: Lincoln, Nebraska
- Composition method: Missouri Plan
- Authorised by: Nebraska Constitution
- Appeals to: Nebraska Supreme Court
- Number of positions: 6
- Website: Official Website

Chief Judge
- Currently: Francie C. Riedmann
- Since: September 13, 2024
- Lead position ends: September 13, 2026

The Nebraska Court of Appeals is the intermediate court of appeals in the U.S. state of Nebraska. Following the passage of a constitutional amendment in 1990, the Nebraska Legislature established the court in 1991. Governor Ben Nelson appointed the first five judges, whose terms began in 1992.

== History ==
In 1989, following a large backlog of cases at the Nebraska Supreme Court, the Legislature began considering the creation of a court of appeals. The Legislature created a temporary court of appeals in 1989, which was made up of three-judge panels of retired judges and district court judges convened by the Supreme Court. The temporary court of appeals expired on December 31, 1990. In the 1990 legislative session, Chief Justice William C. Hastings advocated for the creation of the court, arguing that it was necessary to reduce the court's backlog. Over the opposition of State Senator Ernie Chambers, who argued that the creation of a court of appeals would limit litigants' rights to be heard by the Supreme Court, the Legislature proposed a constitutional amendment allowing the creation of a Court of Appeals. A bipartisan steering committee, "Citizens for Amendment 2," organized to support the measure's passage, and was headed by former Governor Charles Thone, a Republican, and former Lincoln Mayor Helen Boosalis, a Democrat. Voters ultimately approved the measure with 67 percent of the vote.

Following the passage of Amendment 2, the Legislature moved to establish the court. Senator Doug Kristensen proposed the creation of a nine-member court, which would have appellate jurisdiction over all cases, except for criminal cases in which the death penalty or a life sentence was imposed, and decisions involving the constitutionality of laws. The size of the court was reduced to six judges as a cost-saving measure, and the bill was sent to Governor Ben Nelson, who signed the bill into law.

On December 11, 1991, Governor Nelson announced the appointment of the first six judges on the court, which included Lindsey Miller-Lerman, who became the highest-ranking female judge in state history. The judges took office on February 1, 1992.

== Membership ==
Six judges serve on the Court of Appeals, with one selected from each of the Supreme Court districts. When a judicial vacancy occurs, the judicial nominating commission for the district screens nominees, and submits a slate of candidates to the Governor of Nebraska, who appoints one. After selection, the judge serves for three years and then faces a nonpartisan retention election. Upon approval at the retention election, the judge serves a six-year term. No judge on the Court of Appeals has ever lost a retention election.

The Court hears cases in three-judge panels. It nominates its own Chief Judge, a decision that is then ratified by the Supreme Court, which is responsible for "assign[ing] and rotat[ing]" the three-judge panels "in such a manner as to provide each judge the opportunity to serve a proportionate amount of time with every other judge on the court."

Current members of the Nebraska Court of Appeals
District	Name	Start	Appointer	Law School	Retention Elections
1	Riko Bishop	August 20, 2013	Dave Heineman (R)	Nebraska	2016; 2022
2	Michael Pirtle	July 6, 2011	Dave Heineman (R)	Nebraska	2014; 2020
3	Francie Riedmann, Chief Judge	August 9, 2012	Dave Heineman (R)	Creighton	2016; 2022
4	David Arterburn	January 17, 2017	Pete Ricketts (R)	Nebraska	2020
5	Lawrence Welch	March 28, 2018	Pete Ricketts (R)	Creighton	2022
6	Frankie Moore	January 28, 2000	Mike Johanns (R)	Nebraska	2004; 2010; 2016; 2022

== See also ==
- Nebraska Supreme Court
- Courts of Nebraska
