= List of justices of the Nebraska Supreme Court =

Following is a list of justices of the Nebraska Supreme Court:

== Territorial Supreme Court justices ==
Indicates Territorial Chief Justice

Judge	Began active service	Ended active service
Fenner Ferguson	1854	1857
Edward R. Harden	1854	1860
James Bradley	1854	1857
John Curtiss Underwood	1857	1857
Samuel W. Black	1857	1859
Eleazer Wakeley	1857	1861
Augustus Hall	1858	1861
Joseph Miller	1859	1860
William Pitt Kellogg	1861	1865
William F. Lockwood	1861	1867
Joseph E. Streeter	1861	1863
Elmer Scipio Dundy	1863	1867
William Kellogg	1865	1867

== State Supreme Court chief justices ==
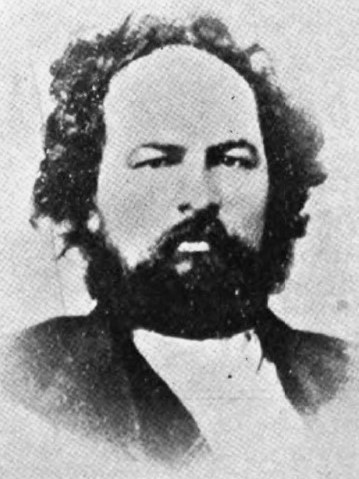
Oliver Perry Mason, first Chief Justice of the Nebraska Supreme Court

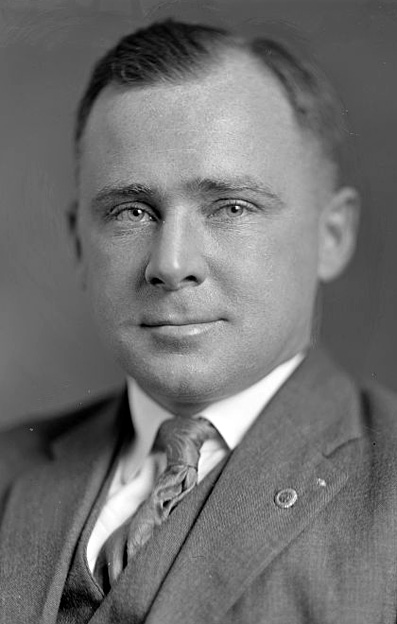
Robert G. Simmons, longest-serving Chief Justice of the Nebraska Supreme Court

Chief Justice	Began service	Ended service	Seat/district	Appointed by
Oliver P. Mason	1867	1873	Seat I	Elected
George B. Lake	1873	1878	Seat II	Elected
Daniel Gantt	1878	1878	Seat I	Elected
Samuel Maxwell	1878	1882	Seat III	Elected
George B. Lake	1882	1884	Seat II	Elected
Amasa Cobb	1884	1886	Seat I	Elected
Samuel Maxwell	1886	1888	Seat III	Elected
Manoah B. Reese	1888	1890	Seat II	Elected
Amasa Cobb	1890	1892	Seat I	Elected
Samuel Maxwell	1892	1894	Seat III	Elected
T. L. Norval	1894	1896	Seat II	Elected
Alfred M. Post	1896	1898	Seat I	Elected
T. O. C. Harrison	1898	1900	Seat III	Elected
T. L. Norval	1900	1902	Seat II	Elected
John Joseph Sullivan	1902	1904	Seat I	Elected
Silas A. Holcomb	1904	1906	Seat III	Elected
Samuel H. Sedgwick	1906	1908	Seat II	Elected
John B. Barnes	1908	1909	Seat I	Elected
Manoah B. Reese	1909	1915	At Large	Ashton C. Shallenberger
Conrad Hollenbeck	1915	1915	At Large	John H. Morehead
Jacob Fawcett	1915	1915	At Large	(pro tempore)
Andrew M. Morrissey	1915	1927	At Large	John H. Morehead
Charles A. Goss	1927	1938	At Large	Adam McMullen
Robert G. Simmons	1939	1963	At Large	Robert Leroy Cochran
Paul W. White	1963	1978	At Large	Frank Morrison
Harry A. Spencer	1978	1978	At Large	(pro tempore)
Norman Krivosha	1978	1987	At Large	Jim Exon
William C. Hastings	1987	1995	At Large	Kay Orr
C. Thomas White	1995	1998	At Large	Ben Nelson
John V. Hendry	1998	2006	At Large	Ben Nelson
Michael Heavican	2006	2024	At Large	Dave Heineman
Jeffrey J. Funke	2024	Incumbent	At Large	Jim Pillen

== All State Supreme Court justices ==
Indicates Service as Chief Justice for All or Part of Tenure

Judge	Began service	Ended service	Seat/district	Appointed by
William A. Little	-	-	Seat I	Elected
Oliver P. Mason	1867	1873	Seat I	Elected
George B. Lake	1867	1884	Seat II	Elected
Lorenzo Crounse	1867	1873	Seat III	Elected
Daniel Gantt	1873	1878	Seat I	Elected
Samuel Maxwell	1873	1894	Seat III	Elected
Amasa Cobb	1878	1892	Seat I	Elected
Manoah B. Reese	1884	1890	Seat II	Elected
T. L. Norval	1890	1902	Seat II	Elected
Alfred M. Post	1892	1898	Seat I	Elected
T. O. C. Harrison	1894	1900	Seat III	Elected
John Joseph Sullivan	1898	1904	Seat I	Elected
Silas A. Holcomb	1900	1906	Seat III	Elected
Samuel H. Sedgwick	1902	1908	Seat II	Elected
John B. Barnes	1904	1909	Seat I	Elected
Charles B. Letton	1906	1925	Seat III / District 3	Elected / Ashton C. Shallenberger
Manoah B. Reese	1908	1915	Seat II / CJ	Elected / Ashton C. Shallenberger
James R. Dean	1909	1910	District 2	Ashton C. Shallenberger
Jesse L. Root	1909	1911	District 5	Ashton C. Shallenberger
Jacob Fawcett	1909	1917	District 6	Ashton C. Shallenberger
William B. Rose	1909	1943	District 1	Ashton C. Shallenberger
John B. Barnes	1909	1917	District 4	Ashton C. Shallenberger
Samuel H. Sedgwick	1910	1919	District 2	Ashton C. Shallenberger
Francis G. Hamer	1911	1918	District 5	Chester H. Aldrich
Conrad Hollenbeck	1915	1915	CJ	John H. Morehead
Andrew M. Morrissey	1915	1927	CJ	John H. Morehead
Albert J. Cornish	1917	1920	District 4	Keith Neville
James R. Dean	1917	1935	District 6	Keith Neville
Chester Hardy Aldrich	1918	1924	District 5	Keith Neville
Leonard A. Flansburg	1920	1923	District 4	Samuel R. McKelvie
George A. Day	1920	1927	District 2	Samuel R. McKelvie
Edward E. Good	1923	1937	District 4	Charles Bryan
William H. Thompson	1924	1931	District 5	Charles Bryan
Robert E. Evans	1925	1925	District 3	Adam McMullen
George A. Eberly	1925	1943	District 3	Adam McMullen
Charles A. Goss	1927	1938	CJ	Adam McMullen
Francis S. Howell	1928	1929	District 2	Adam McMullen
L. B. Day	1929	1938	District 2	Arthur J. Weaver
Bayard H. Paine	1931	1949	District 5	Charles Bryan
Edward F. Carter	1935	1971	District 6	Robert Leroy Cochran
Frederick Messmore	1937	1965	District 4	Robert Leroy Cochran
Harvey M. Johnsen	1939	1940	District 2	Robert Leroy Cochran
Robert G. Simmons	1939	1963	CJ	Robert Leroy Cochran
John W. Yeager	1941	1965	District 2	Robert Leroy Cochran
E. B. Chappell	1943	1961	District 1	Dwight Griswold
Adolph E. Wenke	1943	1961	District 3	Dwight Griswold
Paul E. Boslaugh	1949	1961	District 5	Val Peterson
Harry A. Spencer	1961	1979	District 1	Frank Morrison
Leslie Boslaugh	1961	1994	District 5	Frank Morrison
Robert C. Brower	1961	1967	District 3	Frank Morrison
Paul W. White	1963	1978	CJ	Frank Morrison
Hale McCown	1965	1983	District 4	Frank Morrison
Robert L. Smith	1965	1973	District 2	Frank Morrison
John E. Newton	1967	1977	District 3	Norbert Tiemann
Lawrence M. Clinton	1971	1982	District 6	Jim Exon
Donald Brodkey	1974	1982	District 2	Jim Exon
C. Thomas White	1977	1998	District 3 / CJ	Jim Exon / Ben Nelson
Norman Krivosha	1978	1987	CJ	Jim Exon
William C. Hastings	1979	1995	District 1 / CJ	Charles Thone / Kay Orr
D. Nick Caporale	1982	1998	District 2	Charles Thone
Thomas Michael Shanahan	1983	1993	District 6	Bob Kerrey
John T. Grant	1983	1993	District 4	Bob Kerrey
Dale E. Fahrnbruch	1987	1996	District 1	Kay Orr
David J. Lanphier	1993	1997	District 4	Ben Nelson
John F. Wright	1994	2018	District 6	Ben Nelson
William M. Connolly	1994	2016	District 5	Ben Nelson
John M. Gerrard	1995	2012	District 3	Ben Nelson
Kenneth C. Stephan	1997	2015	District 1	Ben Nelson
Michael McCormack	1997	2016	District 4	Ben Nelson
John V. Hendry	1998	2006	CJ	Ben Nelson
Lindsey Miller-Lerman	1998	2025	District 2	Ben Nelson
Michael Heavican	2006	2024	CJ	Dave Heineman
William B. Cassel	2012	Incumbent	District 3	Dave Heineman
Stephanie F. Stacy	2015	Incumbent	District 1	Pete Ricketts
Max J. Kelch	2016	2018	District 4	Pete Ricketts
Jeffrey J. Funke	2016	Incumbent	District 5 / CJ	Pete Ricketts / Jim Pillen
Jonathan Papik	2018	Incumbent	District 4	Pete Ricketts
John Freudenberg	2018	Incumbent	District 6	Pete Ricketts
Jason Bergevin	2025	Incumbent	District 5	Jim Pillen
Derek Vaughn	2025	Incumbent	District 2	Jim Pillen

Information Gathered from Slipping Backward: A History of the Nebraska Supreme Court, the Nebraska Blue Book, and History of Nebraska By Morton & Watkins
