= McGuire v. McGuire =

1953 Nebraska Supreme Court case

- Court: Nebraska Supreme Court
- Full case name: Lydia McGuire, appellee, v. Charles W. McGuire, appellant.
- Decided: June 26, 1953
- Citation: 59 N.W.2d 336; 157 Neb. 226

Court membership
- Judges sitting: Robert G. Simmons, Edward F. Carter, Frederick Messmore, John W. Yeager, E. B. Chappell, Adolph E. Wenke, Paul E. Boslaugh

Case opinions
- Decision by: Messmore
- Dissent: Yeager

McGuire v. McGuire, 157 Neb. 226, 59 N.W.2d 336 (1953) was a Nebraska Supreme Court case between plaintiff Lydia McGuire and defendant-appellant husband Charles McGuire. The case involved the scope of legally providing for a spouse in a marriage. This case helped to determine a precedence for financial responsibilities of one spouse for another.

== Background ==
Lydia McGuire was previously married to another man from whom she inherited a large stake in property upon termination of the marriage. She then entered into a marriage with Charles McGuire while still holding the property stake in her name. On this property she raised chickens and had a small income from this operation. She used the proceeds from this business, along with rent she received, to pay for groceries, personal items, and trips to see her daughters. She then required a number of surgeries which her husband paid for, but disabled her from receiving the same income on her property. She was therefore unable to spend this income on personal items and trips.

In her marriage to McGuire, she was unhappy and believed she had not been properly provided for. She stated that McGuire, known to be a frugal man, gave her very little money and financial support to live on and provided only the bare minimum. Their house was not equipped with any items that she desired. She never filed for divorce but felt that he owed her significant financial duty and therefore brought the case to a civil court in Nebraska. The court believed Charles McGuire had failed to provide financial care for his wife and awarded Mrs. McGuire significant financial sum. Mr. McGuire felt this judgement was incorrect and unlawful and appealed.

== Case ==
The district court questioned whether or not Mr. McGuire had financially abandoned his wife by not providing her further funds to substitute her losses she used on personal expenses. The court held that in the time the complaint was made she was living under the same roof as her husband. Since there was never a separation or a divorce, it would be difficult to determine that a husband should provide payments to a wife.

== Decision ==
The court ruled that as long as a couple are living together, and not in any way legally separated or divorced, and the home in which they live is maintained, a husband is considered to be providing for his wife. The courts can not interfere in this regard and require a specific monetary level of support. Therefore the district court reversed the trial courts ruling and did not require Mr. McGuire to make financial payments.

== Significance ==
This established the precedent in marriage contracts that when a spouse provides for another, it does not require them to make direct payments to the other. Legally providing for them can be fully fulfilled simply by maintaining the home and the basic expenses, not funds used for personal expenses.

Lydia and Charles McGuire remained married and lived together for thirty-three years despite the ruling.
