= Jack Sullivan =

Jack Sullivan may refer to:

== Sportspeople ==
- Jack Sullivan (baseball) (1873–1924), American baseball catcher
- Jack Sullivan (basketball) (1935–2010), American basketball coach
- Jack Sullivan (footballer, born 1879) (1879–1957), Australian rules footballer for Essendon
- Jack Sullivan (footballer, born 1919) (1919–1990), Australian rules footballer for Richmond
- Jack Sullivan (Irish footballer), Ireland international footballer
- Jack Sullivan (lacrosse) (1870–?), Canadian lacrosse player
- Jack Sullivan (rugby union) (1915–1990), New Zealand rugby union player and coach
- Jack Sullivan Jr. (1933–2002), Australian rules footballer for Carlton

== Others ==
- Jack Sullivan (executive), English football executive
- Jack Sullivan (film director) (1893–1946), assistant film director
- Jack Sullivan (journalist) (1913–1992), Canadian journalist and writer
- Jack Sullivan (literary scholar) (born 1946), American literary scholar, essayist and writer
- Jack Sullivan (born 2020), Canadian child who disappeared mysteriously along with his sister in May 2025

== See also ==
- John Sullivan (disambiguation)
- Jackie Sullivan (1918–1992), baseball player
- Jacquie O'Sullivan (born 1960), British singer
