= John Sullivan =

John Sullivan may refer to:

== Activists ==
- John Earle Sullivan (born 1994), American political activist and convicted participant in the January 6 United States Capitol attack
- William John Sullivan (born 1976), usually known as John Sullivan, free software activist

== Clergy ==
- John Sullivan (Jesuit) (1861–1933), Irish priest, Catholic Blessed in the Altars
- John Joseph Sullivan (bishop) (1920–2001), American clergyman of the Roman Catholic Church

== Entertainers ==
- John Sullivan (writer) (1946–2011), English screenwriter for sitcoms including Only Fools and Horses, Citizen Smith and Just Good Friends
- Fred Allen (John Florence Sullivan), American radio comedian
- John Jeremiah Sullivan (born 1974), American writer and editor
- John L. Sullivan (elephant) (c. 1860–1932), boxing elephant of the Adam Forepaugh Circus

== Mathematicians ==
- John M. Sullivan (mathematician) (born 1963), American mathematician
- John W. Sullivan, mathematician and member of the Palliser Expedition

== Politicians ==
- John Sullivan (Australian politician) (born 1929), Australian politician
- John Sullivan (colonial administrator) (1788–1855), district collector of Coimbatore, southern India
- John Sullivan (MP) (1749–1839), British privy counsellor, MP for Aldborough, Ashburton and Old Sarum
- John Sullivan (Oklahoma politician) (born 1965), United States representative from Oklahoma
- John Alexander Sullivan (1879–1952), Conservative member of the Canadian House of Commons
- John Andrew Sullivan (1868–1927), United States representative from Massachusetts
- John Augustus Sullivan (1798–1871), Jamaican politician
- John B. Sullivan (1897–1951), United States representative from Missouri
- John J. Sullivan (diplomat) (born 1959), former US ambassador to Russia, former deputy secretary of state and deputy secretary of commerce
- John J. Sullivan (Massachusetts politician), running mate of Christy Mihos
- John L. Sullivan (Arizona politician), Arizona attorney general, 1935–1937 and 1944–1948
- John L. Sullivan (United States Navy) (1899–1982), United States Secretary of the Navy
- John Leo Sullivan, secretary of state for the U.S. state of Missouri, 1917–1921
- John M. Sullivan (politician) (born 1959), Illinois state senator
- John P. Sullivan (politician) (1843–1899), merchant and politician in Prince Edward Island, Canada
- John S. Sullivan (1875–1949), member of the Massachusetts Senate and mayor of Worcester, Massachusetts

== Soldiers ==
- John Sullivan (American sailor) (1839–1913), American Civil War sailor and Medal of Honor recipient
- John Sullivan (general) (1740–1795), United States general and delegate to the Continental Congress, Governor of New Hampshire and federal judge
- John Sullivan (VC) (1830–1884), Irish sailor who won the Victoria Cross
- John P. Sullivan (general), United States Army general

== Sportsmen ==
=== Baseball ===
- John Sullivan (1900s catcher) (1873–1924), MLB catcher from 1905 to 1908
- John Sullivan (outfielder) (1890–1966), MLB outfielder from 1920 to 1921
- John Sullivan (pitcher) (1894–1958), MLB pitcher in the 1919 season
- John Sullivan (shortstop) (1920–2007), MLB shortstop from 1942 to 1949
- John Sullivan (1960s catcher) (1941-2023), MLB catcher from 1963 to 1968

=== Cricket ===
- John Sullivan (Lancashire cricketer) (1945–2006), English cricketer
- John Sullivan (Gloucestershire cricketer) (1948–2023), English cricketer

=== Association football ===
- John Sullivan (English footballer) (born 1988), English goalkeeper with Portsmouth F.C.
- John Sullivan (Irish footballer) (born 1991), Irish midfielder with Drogheda United F.C.

=== Gridiron football ===
- John Sullivan (Canadian football) (born 1981), Canadian football player
- John Sullivan (center) (born 1985), American football player
- John Sullivan (kicker) (born 1985), American football player
- John Sullivan (defensive back) (born 1961), American football defensive back
- John Sullivan (American football coach) (1938–2010), American football player and coach
- John Sullivan (linebacker) (born 1956), American football player

=== Other sports ===
- John Sullivan (shot putter), silver medalist in the shot put at the 2000 African Championships in Athletics
- JT Sullivan (born 1988), full name John Sullivan, All-American steeplechase runner for the Stanford Cardinal track and field team
- John Sullivan (tennis) (born 1966), American tennis player
- John L. Sullivan (1858–1918), Irish-American boxer and first heavyweight boxing champion
- John L. Sullivan (wrestler) (born 1946), professional wrestler better known as Johnny Valiant
- Jack Sullivan (basketball) (John Francis Sullivan, 1935–2010), player in the American Basketball League
- Johnny Sullivan (wrestler) (John Sullivan, 1920–2008), Irish-born Olympic wrestler who competed for Great Britain

== Other people ==
- John C. Sullivan (died 1830), surveyor who established the eastern border of Indian Territory
- John Joseph Sullivan (judge) (1855–1926), chief justice of the Nebraska Supreme Court
- John Sullivan (1793–1867), member of the Stephens–Townsend–Murphy Party, the first wagon train to cross the Sierra Nevadas into California
- John P. Sullivan (USN), author of Volume I of the Dictionary of American Naval Fighting Ships

== Characters ==
- John L. Sullivan, lead character in Preston Sturges's Sullivan's Travels, played by Joel McCrea
- John Sullivan, lead character in Frequency, played by Jim Caviezel
- John "Sully" Sullivan, character in Third Watch, played by Skipp Sudduth
- John Sullivan, character in 40 Days and 40 Nights
- John Sullivan, character in Around the World in Eighty Days
- John Sullivan, lead character in "Something Was Wrong" from More Scary Stories to Tell in The Dark

== See also ==
- Jon Sullivan (1950–2021), Australian politician
- Jack Sullivan (disambiguation)
- John O'Sullivan (disambiguation)
- Johnny Sullivan (1932–2003), English boxer
