= Francis S. Howell =

American judge (1863–1937)

Francis Singleton Howell (1863 – June 28, 1937) was a justice of the Nebraska Supreme Court from 1927 to 1929.

== Early life, education, and career ==
Born on a plantation in Milton County, Georgia (later part of Fulton County), Howell attended school in Atlanta, and Emory University, and read law in Loup City, Nebraska to gain admission to the bar.

He practiced law in various cities in the state between 1884 and 1909, moving to Omaha, Nebraska, in 1900.

== United States Attorney ==
In January 1910, President William Howard Taft appointed Howell United States Attorney for the District of Nebraska, The appointment was confirmed, and Howell was formally sworn into office on February 10, 1910. Howell served from 1910 to 1915.

== Nebraska Supreme Court ==
Howell was appointed to the state supreme court on December 29, 1927, to fill a vacancy created by the death of Judge George A. Day. Howell ran for reelection to the seat, but was defeated by L. B. Day, resulting in Howell's retirement from the court in 1929.

== Personal life and death ==
Howell had a son who died in World War I. Howell died at his home in Omaha from heart disease, at the age of 73, and was honored with a memorial service by the state bar.

Political offices
Preceded by George A. Day	Justice of the Nebraska Supreme Court; 1927–1929	Succeeded by L. B. Day
