= Dale E. Fahrnbruch =

American judge (1924–2005)

Dale Eugene Fahrnbruch

Justice of the Nebraska Supreme Court
- In office 1987–1996
- Appointed by: Kay Orr
- Preceded by: William C. Hastings
- Succeeded by: Kenneth C. Stephan

Personal details
- Born: September 13, 1924 Lincoln, Nebraska
- Died: June 1, 2005 (aged 80) Lincoln, Nebraska
- Spouse: Margaret L. Fahrnbruch (née Hunt)
- Education: University of Nebraska (AS); University of Nebraska College of Law (B.S.); Creighton University Law School (J.D.); University of Virginia School of Law (LL.M.)

Military service
- Allegiance: United States of America
- Branch/service: United States Army
- Years of service: 1942–1946

Dale Eugene Fahrnbruch (September 13, 1924 – June 1, 2005) was an American attorney and jurist who served as a justice of the Nebraska Supreme Court from 1987 until his retirement in 1996.

== Early life and education ==
Dale Eugene Fahrnbruch was born on September 13, 1924, in Lincoln, Nebraska, and attended Lincoln High School. After high school, he served in World War II from 1942 to 1946 as a cryptographer in the Philippines. After the war, he graduated from the University of Nebraska with an associates degree in journalism. Subsequently, he attended the University of Nebraska College of Law and received a Bachelors of Science in law, then received his Juris Doctor from Creighton University School of Law in 1951. He also received a master of law from the University of Virginia School of Law in Charlottesville.

== Career ==
After graduating, Fahrnbruch became the city editor of the Lincoln Journal Star. In 1952, he began working at the Lancaster County attorney's office, and was promoted to chief deputy in 1955. Four years later, he left the office and entered into private practice.

In 1972, Fahrnbruch became a judge in the Lancaster County District Court.

In 1987, Governor Kay Orr appointed Fahrnbruch to the Nebraska Supreme Court, succeeding Justice William C. Hastings, who was being promoted to chief justice.

== Personal life and death ==
In 1952, Fahrnbruch married fellow Creighton University School of Law student Margaret L. Fahrnbruch (née Hunt), also an attorney. The couple had two children: Dan, who died in a car accident in 1994, and Rebecca.

Fahrnbruch retired from the Court in 1996, having served nine years. He died on June 1, 2005, at the age of 80, in Lincoln, Nebraska.

Political offices
Preceded by William C. Hastings	Justice of the Nebraska Supreme Court; 1987–1996	Succeeded by Kenneth C. Stephan
