= Jack O'Sullivan =

Jack O'Sullivan may refer to:

- Jack O'Sullivan (Australian footballer)
- Jack O'Sullivan (rugby union)

== See also ==
- John O'Sullivan (disambiguation)
