= John Joseph Sullivan =

John Joseph Sullivan may refer to:

- John Joseph Sullivan (bishop) (1920–2001), American clergyman of the Roman Catholic Church
- John J. Sullivan (diplomat) (1959-), American diplomat and current U.S. Deputy Secretary of State
- John Joseph Sullivan (judge) (1855-1926), Chief Justice of the Nebraska Supreme Court

== See also ==
- John Sullivan (disambiguation)
