= Conrad Hollenbeck =

American judge (1847–1915)

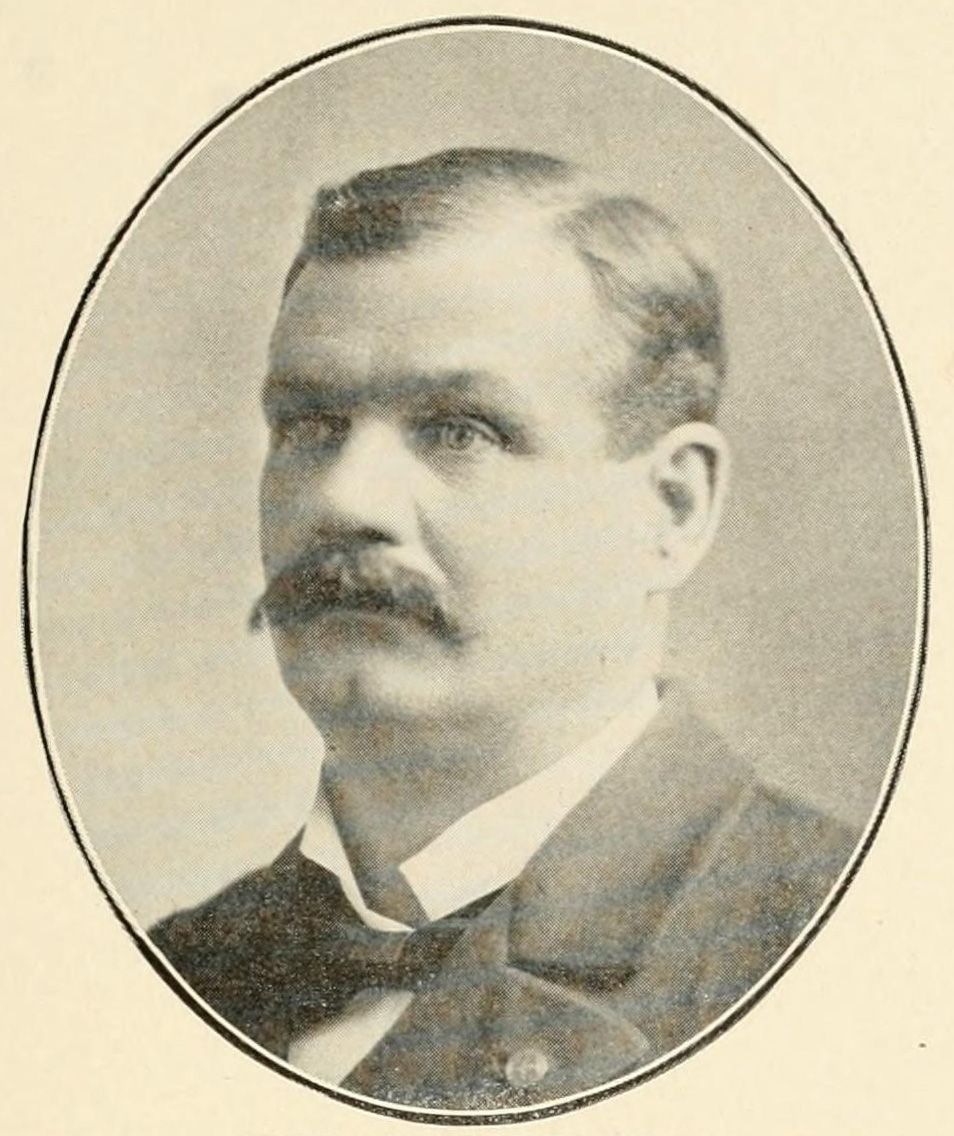
Hollenbeck in Nebraska, 1902

Conrad Hollenbeck (November 19, 1847 – January 21, 1915) was a lawyer and politician who served in the Pennsylvania General Assembly, and later served as chief justice of the Nebraska Supreme Court for fourteen days, from January 7, 1915 until his death on January 21, 1915.

== Early life, education, and career ==
Born on his father's farm in Hebron, Potter County, Pennsylvania, Hollenbeck was the son of John and Emily (Parker) Hollenbeck.

He fought for the Union Army in the American Civil War, enlisting as a private in Williamsport, Pennsylvania, on September 6, 1864 at the age of 16, and serving with the 207th Pennsylvania Infantry Regiment. He participated in all of the battles of the Army of the Potomac from the Battle of the Wilderness to the surrender of Lee.

After attending the district schools of his native county, Hollenbeck graduated from Mansfield University of Pennsylvania (then called Mansfield College) in June 1869, and then began the study of law in the office of Isaac Benson at Coudersport, Pennsylvania. He was admitted to the bar in 1871, and for about six years practiced his profession at Coudersport.

== Political and judicial service ==
Hollenbeck was twice elected as a Democrat to the Pennsylvania House of Representatives, in 1874 and 1875. He sought reelection to a third term in 1876, but was defeated.

He left for the west in May 1877, settling in Fremont, Nebraska. In 1890 he was elected county attorney of Dodge county, continuing in the office until 1895. He was a delegate to the 1896 Democratic National Convention in Chicago, and in 1898 he was elected judge of Nebraska's 6th judicial district, where he remained until 1915. In the fall of 1901 he was the candidate of the fusionists for judge of the supreme court of Nebraska, but was defeated at the election with the rest of his ticket.

In 1914, Hollenbeck was elected chief justice of the Nebraska Supreme Court, defeating incumbent Chief Justice Manoah B. Reese, a Republican, in an election that was broadly swept by Democrats. Hollenbeck took office at the beginning of January 1915, but died just fourteen days into his term, having been plagued by heart problems for the preceding two years.

== Personal life and death ==
On May 9, 1877, Hollenbeck married Jannett Knox at Coudersport, with whom he had one son, Frank, who became an attorney and treasurer of Fremont, Nebraska.

He died at the age of 57 from heart disease.

Political offices
Preceded by Manoah B. Reese	Justice of the Nebraska Supreme Court; 1915–1915	Succeeded by Jacob Fawcett
