= Justice Boslaugh =

Justice Boslaugh may refer to:

- Leslie Boslaugh (1916–2006), associate justice of the Nebraska Supreme Court
- Paul E. Boslaugh (1881–1961), associate justice of the Nebraska Supreme Court
