= William A. Little =

William A. Little may refer to:

- William A. Little (Georgia judge), Justice of the Supreme Court of Georgia from 1897 to 1903
- William A. Little (Nebraska judge) (c. 1832–1867), Justice of the Nebraska Supreme Court elected in 1867
- William A. Little (physicist) (fl. 1960s–1970s), co-discoverer of the Little–Parks effect
