= Justice Little =

Justice Little may refer to:

- Philip Francis Little (1824–1897), chief justice of the Supreme Court of Newfoundland
- William A. Little (Georgia judge) (1838–1924), associate justice of the Supreme Court of Georgia
- William A. Little (Nebraska judge) (c. 1832–1867), associate justice of the Nebraska Supreme Court
