= C. Thomas White =

American judge (1928–2020)

C. Thomas White (October 5, 1928 – December 11, 2020) was a justice of the Nebraska Supreme Court from January 6, 1977 to 1998. Initially appointed to replace retiring Judge John E. Newton, White was named chief justice on January 26, 1995, to replace retiring Chief Justice Hastings. White served as chief until his retirement in 1998.

Born in Humphrey, Nebraska, White received his law degree as valedictorian of his class from Creighton University School of Law in 1952.

White died in Omaha, Nebraska, at the age of 92.

Political offices
Preceded by John E. Newton	Justice of the Nebraska Supreme Court; 1977–1995	Succeeded by John M. Gerrard
Preceded by William C. Hastings	Chief Justice of the Nebraska Supreme Court; 1995–1998	Succeeded by John V. Hendry
