= George A. Day =

American judge (–1927)

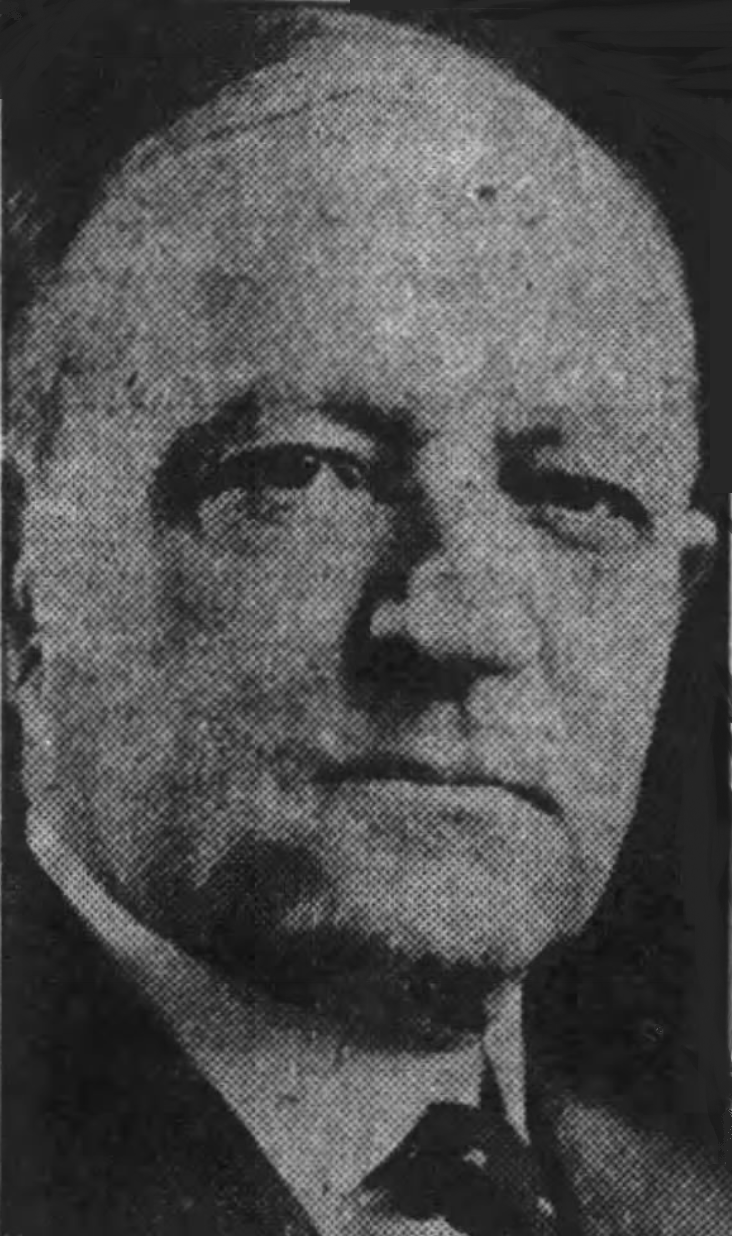
Justice George A. Day

George A. Day (November 10, 1859 – December 20, 1927) was a justice of the Nebraska Supreme Court. He was appointed on January 8, 1920, to fill a vacancy created by the death of Judge Sedgwick, and served until his own death on December 20, 1927.

== Education ==
Born in Union County, Iowa, Day was educated in the public schools of Sidney, Iowa, and graduated from Tabor College in 1882. He received a law degree from the University of Iowa in 1883, and entered the practiced of law in Omaha, Nebraska, in 1883.

== Career ==
He was assistant attorney general of Nebraska from 1895 to 1896, and a member of the supreme court commission in 1901 and 1902. Day then served on the Nebraska Second District Court in Omaha from 1902 to 1919.

On January 8, 1920, Governor Samuel Roy McKelvie appointed Day to a seat on the state supreme court vacated by the death of judge Samuel H. Sedgwick. Day was reelected without opposition in 1922, and had filed for renomination for an additional term on November 28, 1927, the month before his death. At the time of his filing for renomination, no possible opponent had been suggested.

== Death ==
Day died at the Lincoln sanitarium at the age of 68, after a brief illness, having gone there for treatment for heart disease. He was interred in Omaha.

Political offices
Preceded by Samuel H. Sedgwick	Justice of the Nebraska Supreme Court; 1920–1927	Succeeded by Francis S. Howell
