= Leslie Boslaugh =

American judge (1917–2006)

Leslie Boslaugh (September 14, 1917 – February 16, 2006) was an American lawyer who served as a justice of the Nebraska Supreme Court for 33 years from 1961 until his retirement in 1994.

== Early life, education, and career ==
Born in Hastings, Nebraska, Boslaugh attended Hastings public schools, and received his law degree, cum laude, from the University of Nebraska College of Law in 1941, where he was a member of Phi Kappa Psi fraternity.

During World War II, Boslaugh served in the United States Army Field Artillery Corps, attaining the rank of second lieutenant. He served in both combat and post-war occupation duties in Germany, including service with the Third Army's judge advocate section in Munich and Heidelberg.

Following his military service, Boslaugh practiced law in Hastings and later worked for the Nebraska Attorney General's Office in Lincoln, Nebraska, as an assistant attorney general. He also served as Hastings city attorney, chairman of the Adams County Republican Central Committee, and president of the Adams County Bar Association.

== Judicial service ==
In 1960, Boslaugh was elected to the state supreme court, to succeed his father, P.E. Boslaugh, who swore him in. Boslough assumed office in 1961, and served until his retirement in 1994, a total of 33 years. He was retained in retention elections in 1966, 1972. 1978, 1984 and 1990.

In 1984, he served as Chief Justice Pro Tem, presiding over the impeachment trial of then-Attorney General Paul L. Douglas. At the time of his retirement announcement in August 1994, Boslaugh was the court's senior member and the last justice who had originally been elected to the court before Nebraska adopted a judicial appointment system through a 1962 constitutional amendment. He retired effective September 1, 1994, stating that he had not been in the best of health and was tired after more than 32 years on the bench.

== Personal life and death ==
In 1943, Boslaugh married Elizabeth Meyer, with whom he had two daughters and a son. He recorded an interview for the Nebraska Oral Histories project in 1997 that is available online.

Boslaugh died in Lincoln, Nebraska, at the age of 88.

== See also ==
- List of justices of the Nebraska Supreme Court

Political offices
Preceded by Paul E. Boslaugh	Justice of the Nebraska Supreme Court; 1961–1994	Succeeded by William M. Connolly
