= Hale McCown =

American judge (1914–2005)

H. Hale McCown (January 19, 1914 – September 1, 2005) was a justice of the Nebraska Supreme Court from 1965, when he was appointed to fill a vacancy on the court, until he retired in 1983.

== Early life, education, and career ==
Born in Kansas, Illinois, to Ross and Pauline (Collins) McCown, who moved the family to Beatrice, Nebraska, when McCown was ten, McCown graduated from Beatrice High School, and received an B.A. from Hastings College in 1935, followed by an LL.B. from the Duke University School of Law in 1937. While at Duke, his classmates included Richard Nixon, with whom he became friends, and Helen Lanier, whom he married in 1938. McCown and Lanier were among the few married couples who graduated from Duke Law together in that era. During World War II, McCown served in the United States Naval Reserve for two and a half years, where he achieved the rank of lieutenant. He was stationed in the Pacific Theater as a fighter director/intercept officer aboard an escort carrier, and received six battle stars, the Philippine Liberation Medal, and a Navy Unit Citation.

McCown began his legal career in private practice, joining the Beatrice, Nebraska, firm Rinaker, Delehant & Hevelone. He later became a partner in McCown, Baumfalk & Dalke, representing clients such as Union Pacific Railroad and Dempster Mill Manufacturing Company. He also served as general counsel for the Vise-Grip Tool Company. McCown was active in the Nebraska Bar Association, serving as chair of the House of Delegates from 1955 to 1956 and as president from 1960 to 1961. In 1960, he chaired a "Democrats for Nixon" committee in Nebraska.

== Nebraska Supreme Court ==
On December 16, 1964, Governor Frank B. Morrison appointed McCown, under the newly adopted merit-based judicial selection plan, to a seat on the Nebraska Supreme Court vacated by the retirement of Justice Frederick Messmore. McCown took office at the beginning of 1965, and served on the bench until his retirement in 1983, during which he wrote more than 750 opinions, including over 200 dissents. His legal opinions were noted for their clarity and conciseness. He gained a reputation for his independence and commitment to justice, famously dissenting in a case involving a controversial tax bill signed by the governor who had appointed him. After retiring from the court, McCown remained active in the legal community, serving as an emeritus member of the American Law Institute's council until 2000.

== Later life and legacy ==
McCown and his wife had three children, one of whom, Bob McCown, was badly affected by polio, and preceded them in death. McCown died in Yellow Springs, Ohio, at the age of 91. His wife died a few weeks thereafter.

Political offices
| Preceded by Frederick Messmore | Justice of the Nebraska Supreme Court; 1965–1983 | Succeeded by John T. Grant |
