= Norman Krivosha =

American judge (1934–2021)

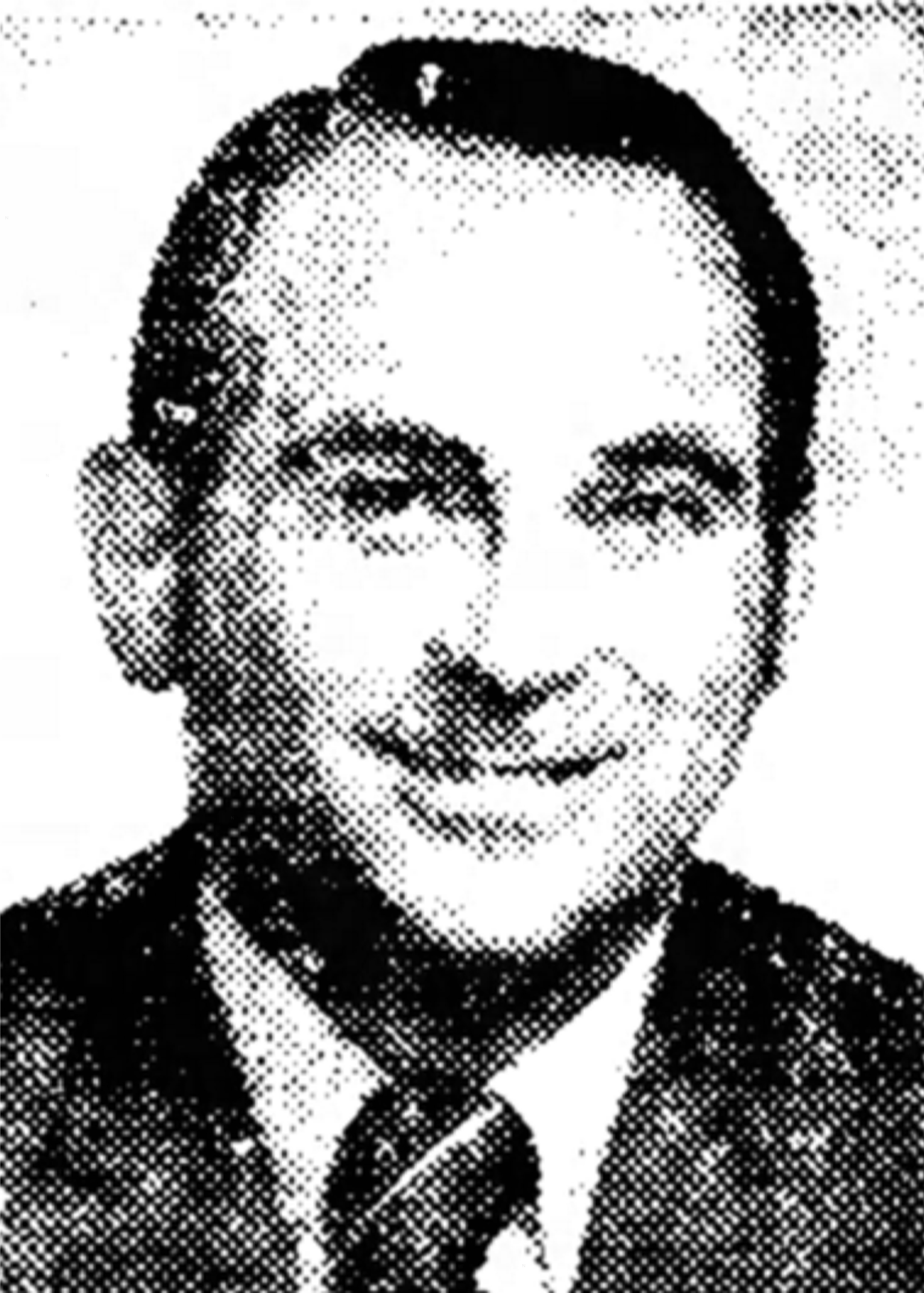

Chief Justice of the Nebraska Supreme Court
- In office December 22, 1978 – July 31, 1987
- Preceded by: Harry A. Spencer
- Succeeded by: William C. Hastings

Personal details
- Born: Norman Marvin Krivosha; August 3, 1934 Detroit, Michigan
- Died: January 26, 2021 (aged 86) Naples, Florida
- Spouse: Helene Sherman
- Children: 2 daughters
- Education: University of Nebraska (B.S. 1956, J.D. 1958)

Norman Marvin Krivosha (August 3, 1934 – January 26, 2021) was the chief justice of the Nebraska Supreme Court from 1978, when he was appointed to fill a vacancy, until his retirement on 1987.

== Early life and career ==
Krivosha was born on August 3, 1934, in Detroit, Michigan, the son of David and Molly Krivosha. He moved to Lincoln, Nebraska, where he and his wife, the former Helene Sherman, were active in the Tifereth Israel Synagogue. He received a bachelor's degree in law from the University of Nebraska in 1956 before graduating from its law school two years later. He would later serve as an adjunct professor at his alma mater. He became a partner in the law firm Ginsburg, Rosenberg, Ginsburg & Krivosha until his 1978 appointment to the state supreme court.

== Supreme Court and later career ==
He was a close associate of Governor Jim Exon, who appointed Krivosha as the chief justice of the Nebraska Supreme Court on December 22, 1978. As chief justice, he worked to make the Supreme Court more accessible and understandable, including with the use of television cameras in the courtroom. During his tenure, judges' salaries and pensions were raised, and he successfully campaigned for the merger of county and municipal courts in Lincoln and Omaha. He resigned from the court on July 31, 1987, when he became general counsel for Ameritas until 2000. While with Ameritas, he served as president of the Association of Corporate Counsel. He then opened the first Kutak Rock office in Lincoln, and moved to Naples, Florida in 2005. He served as president of the Jewish Federation in Naples, where he died on January 26, 2021.

== Electoral history ==
1982 retention election: Chief Justice, Nebraska Supreme Court
Candidate	Votes	%
Yes	329,084	77.5
No	95,612	22.5

Political offices
Preceded by Harry A. Spencer	Chief Justice of the Nebraska Supreme Court; 1978–1987	Succeeded by William C. Hastings
