= Charles A. Goss =

American judge (1864–1938)

Charles A. Goss (1864–August 13, 1938) was chief justice of the Nebraska Supreme Court from 1927 until his death in 1938.

== Early life and education ==
Born in Ohio in 1864.

== Career ==
Goss moved to Omaha, Nebraska in 1886, where he practiced law for twenty-eight years. He served in the legislature of 1893 and was president of the Omaha Bar Association in 1898. He was the United States Attorney for Nebraska from 1906 to 1910, winning 89% of his cases, and then returned to private practice, shortly thereafter becoming a partner in the firm of Switzler, Goss & Switzler.

In 1920, Goss was elected to serve as a district court judge, becoming the presiding judge of the Fourth Judicial District in 1923. In 1926 he ran as a politically independent candidate for Chief Justice of the Nebraska Supreme Court.

Political offices
Preceded by Andrew M. Morrissey	Chief Justice of the Nebraska Supreme Court; 1927–1938	Succeeded by Robert G. Simmons
