= Justice Hastings =

Justice Hastings may refer to:

- Bill Hastings (judge) (fl. 2000s–2020s), chief justice of the Republic of Kiribati
- Serranus Clinton Hastings (1814–1893), chief justice of the Iowa Supreme Court
- William C. Hastings (1921–2010), associate justice of the Nebraska Supreme Court

== See also ==
- Judge Hastings (disambiguation)
