= Justice Sedgwick =

Justice Sedgwick may refer to:

- Samuel H. Sedgwick (1848–1919), associate justice of the Nebraska Supreme Court
- Theodore Sedgwick (1746–1813), associate justice of the Massachusetts Supreme Judicial Court

== See also ==
- Robert Sedgewick (judge) (1848–1906), justice of the Supreme Court of Canada
