= Justice Root =

Justice Root may refer to:

- Jesse Root (1736–1822), chief justice of the Connecticut Supreme Court
- Jesse L. Root (1860–1947), associate justice of the Nebraska Supreme Court
- Milo A. Root (1863–1917), associate justice of the Washington Supreme Court
