= Max J. Kelch =

American judge

Associate Justice of the Nebraska Supreme Court
- In office February 3, 2016 – January 23, 2018
- Appointed by: Pete Ricketts
- Preceded by: Michael McCormack
- Succeeded by: Jonathan Papik

Personal details
- Education: University of Nebraska–Lincoln (BS); University of Nebraska College of Law (JD)

Max J. Kelch is a former Associate Justice of the Nebraska Supreme Court.

== Biography ==
Kelch received his Bachelor of Science from the University of Nebraska–Lincoln in 1979 and his Juris Doctor from the University of Nebraska College of Law in 1981.

Kelch began his legal career in 1982. He has worked as a deputy attorney in Nemaha County, Syracuse, and Nebraska City, a special prosecutor in Johnson County, an Otoe County attorney, and a private practice lawyer.

== State court service ==
Kelch served as a Judge of the County Court, 2nd Judicial District from 2005 to 2007 and as a Judge of the District Court, 2nd Judicial District from 2007 to 2016.

== Nebraska Supreme Court service ==
On February 3, 2016 Nebraska Governor Pete Ricketts announced his appointment of Kelch to the Supreme Court because of the retirement of Michael McCormack. He was sworn in on March 11, 2016. Kelch resigned on January 23, 2018 effective immediately due a proposed ethics investigation.

Legal offices
Preceded by Michael McCormack	Associate Justice of the Nebraska Supreme Court; 2016–2018	Succeeded by Jonathan Papik
