= T. L. Norval =

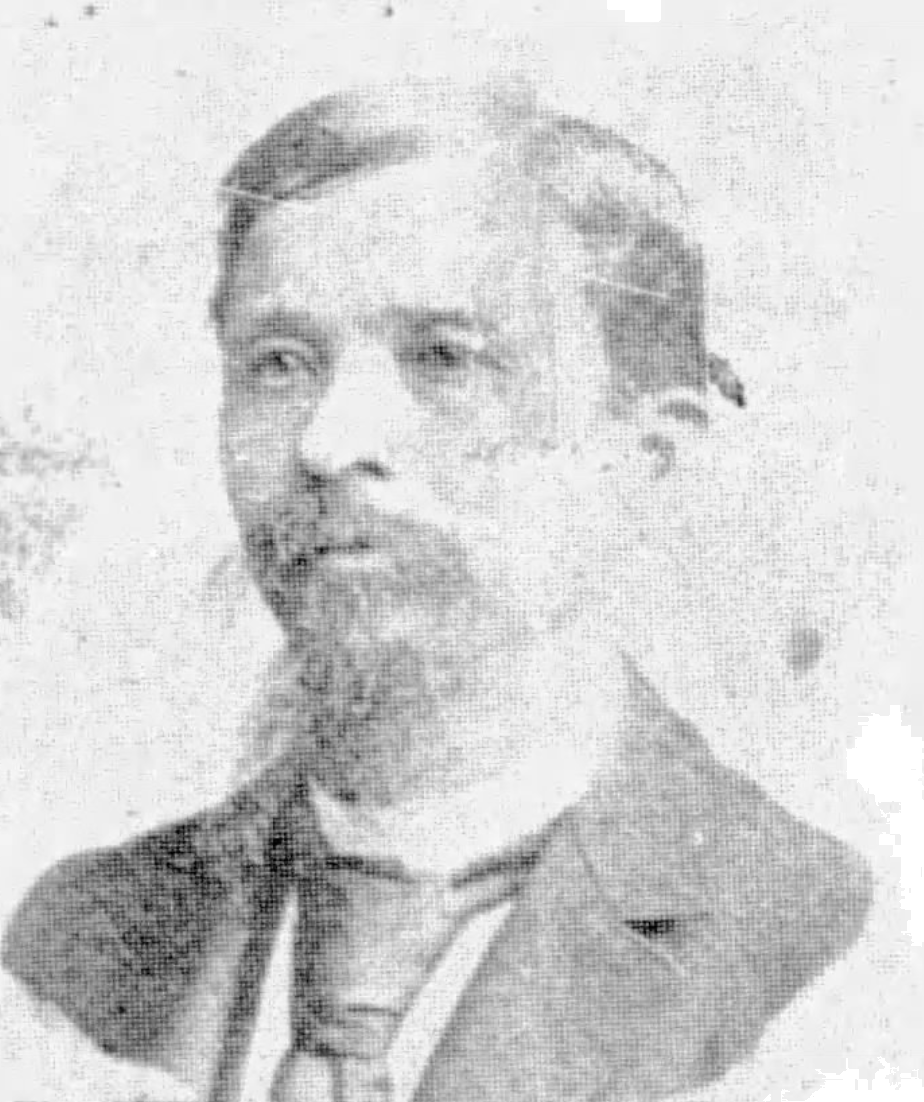
Justice T. L. Norval

Theophilus Lincoln Norval (August 26, 1847 – February 9, 1942) was a justice of the Nebraska Supreme Court from 1890 to 1902, serving as chief justice from 1894 to 1896, and again from 1900 to 1902.

Born in London Mills, Fulton County, Illinois, Norval received his early education in the common schools of that state. Norval "began reading law at 20 while teaching school", and was "an honor graduate of the University of Michigan in 1871". When he was 25 years of age he decided to move west, choosing Nebraska as his destination. In March 1872, he reached Seward County, Nebraska, where he settled down. There he "gained recognition as a successful lawyer, and established a large practice throughout the state".

In 1879 he was elected to represent his district in the Nebraska State Senate, and in March 1883, when Judge George W. Post resigned the office of district judge of the Nebraska Sixth Judicial District, Governor James W. Dawes appointed Norval to the position. In the fall of the same year he was elected to fill the unexpired term and in the fall of 1887 he was re-elected. In November 1889, Norval was elected to a seat on the state supreme court, taking his seat in January 1890 as the junior member of the court. From 1894 to 1895, under the rules governing the court, Norval was chief justice, and in the fall of 1895 he was re-elected, again becoming the junior member in 1896. In 1898 he advanced under these same rules to the position of second member of the court. He again served as chief justice from 1900 to 1902, after which he left the court. In 1904, he was a Presidential Elector for Nebraska.

Forty years after leaving the court, Norval died in Los Angeles, California, at the age of 94.

Political offices
Preceded by Manoah B. Reese	Justice of the Nebraska Supreme Court; 1890–1902	Succeeded by Samuel H. Sedgwick
