= John E. Newton (judge) =

American judge (1904–1984)

John Edward Newton (April 4, 1904 – March 25, 1984) was a justice of the Nebraska Supreme Court, appointed to fill a vacancy on the court in 1967 and serving until his retirement in 1971.

Born in Ponca, Nebraska, Newton graduated from Ponca High School and received his law degree from the University of Nebraska College of Law.

On July 12, 1940, Newton married Bonnie May Brownlee, with whom he had a son and a daughter. He died at his home in Ponca at the age of 79.

Political offices
Preceded by Robert C. Brower	Justice of the Nebraska Supreme Court; 1967–1971	Succeeded by C. Thomas White
