= Messmore =

Messmore may refer to:

- Isaac E. Messmore (1821–1902), Canadian American lawyer, politician, and Union Army officer in the American Civil War
- Frederick Messmore (1889–1969), Justice of the Nebraska Supreme Court
- J. H. Messmore, a pioneer educationist missionary in Lucknow, and forebear of Lucknow Christian College
- Messmore Inter College, one of the oldest schools in the Pauri Garhwal district of India
