= Andrew M. Morrissey =

American judge

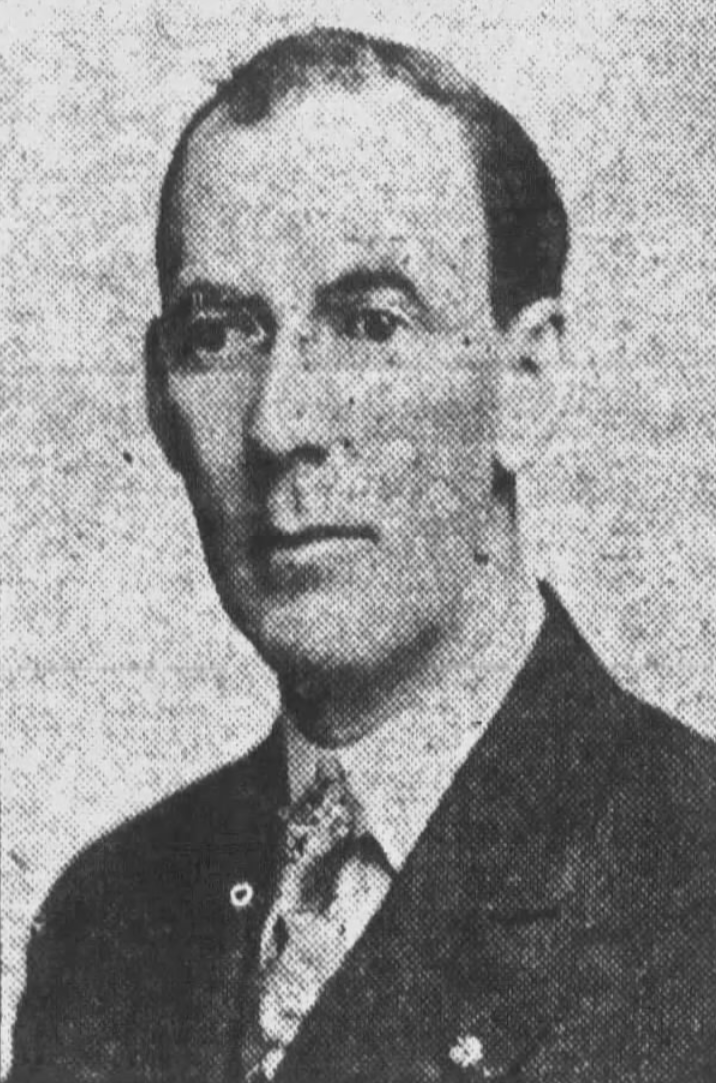
Andrew M. Morrissey, at the time of his appointment to the court.

Andrew M. Morrissey (December 27, 1871 – September 8, 1933) was chief justice of the Nebraska Supreme Court from 1915 to 1927. Morrissey was appointed chief justice on January 25, 1915, to fill vacancy created by death of Chief Justice Hollenbeck.

Born in Livonia, New York, Morrissey attended the public schools and moved to Nebraska in 1890. He took a position in the county clerk's office in Dawes County, Nebraska, and then began reading law in 1896 to gain admission to the bar, entering private practice in 1898. In the fall of 1898, he was elected county attorney of Cherry County, Nebraska, holding that office until 1903, when he declined to seek re-election. He moved to Lincoln, Nebraska, in 1911 and was an unsuccessful candidate for attorney general in 1912, after which he accepted an appointment as private secretary to Governor John H. Morehead and served in that capacity during the governor's first term. At the beginning of 1915, Attorney General Willis E. Reed selected Morrissey as his deputy, in which position he served until he was appointed Chief Justice in February 1915.

In May 1932, Morrissey became an attorney for the comptroller of the currency in the United States Department of the Treasury, in Washington, D.C., but his service was cut short by ill health that had plagued him since the late 1920s. In August 1932, he suffered from nervous prostration, and was taken back to Lincoln, Nebraska, to the home of his brother, where he died several weeks later, at the age of 61.

Political offices
Preceded by Jacob Fawcett	Chief Justice of the Nebraska Supreme Court; 1915–1927	Succeeded by Charles A. Goss
