= John T. Grant (judge) =

American judge (1920–2010)

John Thomas Grant (October 25, 1920 – January 26, 2010) was a justice of the Nebraska Supreme Court. He was appointed September 1, 1983, to replace retiring Judge McCown, and served until his retirement in 1993.

Born in Omaha, Nebraska, Grant attended local schools before working for the Nebraska Power Company until he joined the United States Army during World War II. He served in the Pacific Theatre, and "was in Okinawa when the U.S. dropped atomic bombs on Nagasaki and Hiroshima". He received his law degree from the Creighton University School of Law in 1950, and entered private practice. In 1973, Grant was elected president of the Omaha Bar Association, taking office the following year.

In February 1973 Grant was approved for appointment to the Nebraska Court of Industrial Relations. On April 17, 1974, Governor J. James Exon appointed Grant to a seat on the Nebraska Fourth Judicial District Court vacated by the elevation of Donald Brodkey to the state supreme court, and in 1983, Governor Bob Kerrey appointed Grant himself to the state supreme court.

Grant was married twice, first to Marian Saner on December 27, 1947, with whom he had five children, and after her death to Zella Thomas. Grant died of pneumonia in Omaha, at the age of 89.

Political offices
Preceded by Hale McCown	Justice of the Nebraska Supreme Court; 1983–1993	Succeeded by David J. Lanphier
