= Justice Cornish =

Justice Cornish may refer to:

- Albert J. Cornish (1856–1920), associate justice of the Nebraska Supreme Court
- Leslie C. Cornish (1854–1925), associate justice and chief justice of the Maine Supreme Judicial Court
