= L. B. Day (judge) =

American judge (1889–1938)

L. B. Day (February 3, 1889 – November 22, 1938) was a justice of the Nebraska Supreme Court from 1929 until his death in 1938.

== Career ==
Born in Westboro, Missouri, Day attended the public schools of Albion, Nebraska, and received a law degree from Creighton University in Omaha, Nebraska in 1914. He engaged in private practice until 1920, when he was elected as a Nebraska district judge at the age of 31, serving from 1922 to 1928 "on the domestic relations bench where he gained a reputation as an authority on marriage and divorce". On one occasion, faced with a defendant who had repeatedly been brought before the court as a wife-beater, he threatened to come down from the bench and fight the defendant.

In 1928, Day defeated recently appointed incumbent Francis S. Howell to be elected to the Nebraska Supreme Court, and was reelected in 1934 to a term scheduled to expire in 1940.

== Personal life and death ==
Day's initials, "L. B.", were reportedly his full name, and not an abbreviation. He married and had three sons, one of whom was also named L. B. Day, and became a prominent labor leader. Day died from complications following a bout of pneumonia, at the age of 49.

Political offices
Preceded by Francis S. Howell	Justice of the Nebraska Supreme Court; 1929–1938	Succeeded by Harvey M. Johnsen
