= Edward Harden =

Edward Harden may refer to:

- Edward Harden Mansion, historic home built in Sleepy Hollow, New York, in 1909
- Edward R. Harden (1815–1884), Nebraska and Georgia judge
