= George A. Eberly =

American judge (1871–1958)

George Agler Eberly (February 9, 1871 – September 12, 1958) was a justice of the Nebraska Supreme Court. He was appointed July 24, 1925, to fill a vacancy created by the death of Judge Evans, serving until 1943.

Born in Fort Wayne, Indiana, Eberly came to Stanton, Nebraska, with his family at the age of two. He received an LL.B. and an LL.M. from the University of Michigan, gaining admission to the bar in 1893. He entered the practice of law in Stanton, but left to serve as a sergeant in the Spanish–American War. After his return from the war, he resumed his legal practice, serving as Stanton County Attorney from 1905 to 1909. In 1925, Governor Adam McMullen appointed Eberly to a seat on the state supreme court, to which re-elected twice.

With his wife, Rose, Eberly had one son and one daughter. Eberly retired from the court in 1942, to Lincoln, Nebraska, where he died at the Veterans Hospital at the age of 87.

Political offices
Preceded by Robert E. Evans	Justice of the Nebraska Supreme Court; 1925–1943	Succeeded by Adolph E. Wenke
