= James R. Dean =

American judge (1862–1936)

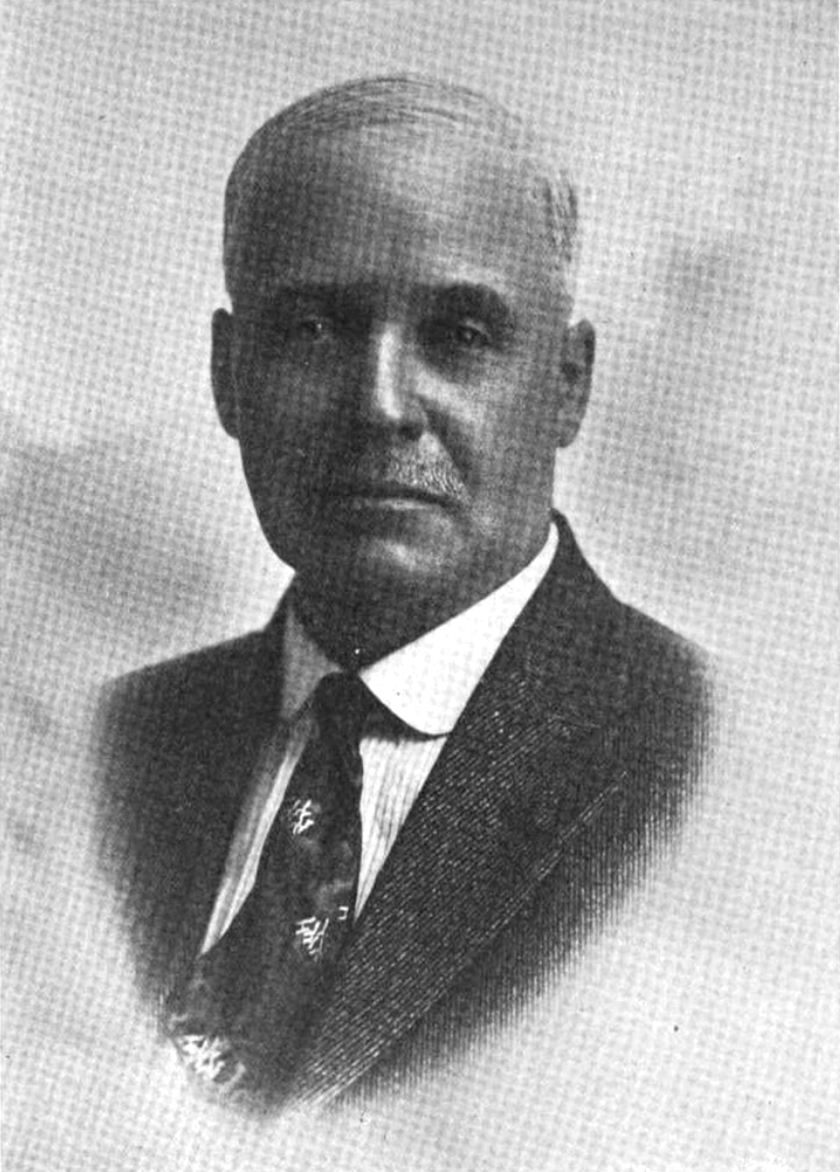
Justice James R. Dean.

James Renwick Dean (September 15, 1862 – January 5, 1936) was a justice of the Nebraska Supreme Court from 1909 to 1910, and again from 1917 to 1935.

== Early life, education, and career ==
Born in St. Louis, Missouri, to Henry and Ellen Margaret Dean, his father emigrated from County Antrim, Ireland, at age seventeen, and his mother was a native of South Carolina, of Scotch-Irish descent. Dean received his preliminary education in his native city and in Decorah, Iowa. When he was ten years old he visited Europe with his father. After turning twelve, except when in school, he worked on a farm until he entered his profession. In 1885, he graduated from the University of Michigan Law School, at Ann Arbor, besides taking other branches of study at the university and paying his own way through school.

That year he located and entered practice in Chicago, where he remained until he came to Broken Bow, Custer County, Nebraska. He was elected county attorney in 1894 and re-elected in 1896. He was city attorney of Broken Bow for four years, and a member of the board of education for ten years, serving four years as its president. In his first year as city attorney he compiled the ordinances of 1904. A Presbyterian, he was commissioned in 1906 from the presbytery to the General Assembly at Des Moines, Iowa.

== Judicial service ==
On January 1, 1909, Dean was appointed by Governor George L. Sheldon to a seat on the Nebraska Supreme Court created by an amendment to the state constitution increasing the membership of the supreme court from three judges to seven. He was narrowly defeated in a bid for re-election in 1911, on a Democratic Party ticket. Dean also maintained a farm northeast of Broken Bow where he began growing alfalfa, having become interested in the crop in 1910, and coming to yield 100 acres per year within the next decade. In 1912, he was an at-large Presidential Elector for Nebraska for Woodrow Wilson. On November 7, 1916, Judge Dean was elected to the Nebraska Supreme Court for a term of six years, in a non-partisan election, for a term beginning on January 4, 1917, remaining there until 1935. He died the following year.

== Personal life ==
In January 1892, Dean married Miss Jennie E. Sutton, daughter of Albert Y. and Abbie C. Sutton, of Broken Bow, with whom he had two children, Paul H. and Dorothy S. Dean. In his later years he visited nearly every state in the Union, as well as Mexico and Canada.

Political offices
Preceded by Newly created seat Jacob Fawcett	Justice of the Nebraska Supreme Court; 1909–1910; 1917–1935	Succeeded by Samuel H. Sedgwick; Edward F. Carter
