= Bayard H. Paine =

American judge (1872–1955)

Bayard Henry Paine (April 27, 1872 – April 19, 1955) was a justice of the Nebraska Supreme Court from 1931 to 1949.

Born in Painesville, Ohio, Paine graduated from Grand Island High School in 1889. He graduated from Northwestern University with a bachelor's degree and studied law at the University of Michigan. He passed the Nebraska bar in 1904. After working as a lawyer he became a judge. He served as a Nebraska Supreme Court Justice from 1931-1949.

Paine died at his home in Grand Island, Nebraska, from coronary thrombosis, at the age of 82.

Political offices
Preceded by William H. Thompson	Justice of the Nebraska Supreme Court; 1931–1949	Succeeded by Paul E. Boslaugh
