= Robert L. Smith (judge) =

American judge (1918–1999)

Robert L. Smith (February 20, 1918 – April 23, 1999) was a justice of the Nebraska Supreme Court from 1965, when he was appointed to fill a vacancy on the Court, until his retirement in 1973.

Smith received his law degree from the Creighton University School of Law, and practiced law in Omaha, Nebraska, from 1947 to 1960. Smith was serving as an Omaha District Judge when he was appointed by Governor Frank B. Morrison to a seat on the state supreme court vacated by the retirement of Justice John W. Yeager. Smith retired from the court in 1973.

Smith died at his home in Springfield, Nebraska, at the age of 81.

Political offices
Preceded by John W. Yeager	Justice of the Nebraska Supreme Court; 1965–1973	Succeeded by Donald Brodkey
