= Jesse L. Root =

American judge (1860–1947)

Jesse L. Root (November 27, 1860 – September 8, 1947) was a justice of the Nebraska Supreme Court from 1909 to 1911.

Born in Illinois, Root gained admission to the bar in Cass County, Nebraska, in 1887, and served as the county attorney for three terms. In 1907, Root was elected to serve as a senator in the Nebraska Legislature, and was in that office when he was appointed to one of four newly created seats on the state supreme court by Governor George L. Sheldon, on December 7, 1908. Root sought re-election to the seat in 1911, but was defeated in August of that year.

Root then returned to the practice of law until his retirement in 1932, after which he "maintained a keen interest in public affairs and in the progress of the law" until his death, at the age of 86.

Political offices
| Preceded by Newly reconfigured court | Justice of the Nebraska Supreme Court; 1909–1911 | Succeeded by Francis G. Hamer |
