= Gartrell v. Stafford =

Nebraska Supreme Court Ruling

Gartrell v. Stafford, 12 Neb. 545, 11 N.W. 732 (1882) is a frequently cited 1882 decision of the Nebraska Supreme Court. It holds that in the case of suit for breach of a contract for the sale of real property, there is never an adequate remedy at law, since it may be presumed that the buyer has considered the particular location, soil, easements, and other factors. Since an action for damages would not provide an adequate remedy, the remedy of specific performance is available.

== See also ==
- Equitable remedy
