= Albert J. Cornish =

American judge (1856–1920)

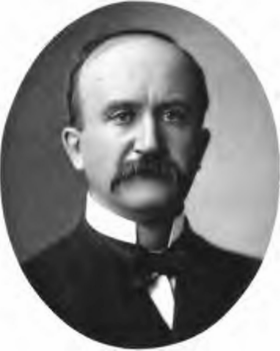
1881 photograph of Albert J. Cornish

Albert Judson Cornish (December 10, 1856 – April 18, 1920) was a justice of the Nebraska Supreme Court from 1917 to 1920.

Cornish attended Tabor College in Iowa and Cornell University in New York, and graduated from Iowa City Law School in 1879, also later taking a post graduate course at Harvard Law School. He was admitted to the bar in March 1881, and entered the private practice of law in Lincoln, Nebraska. He was elected to the Nebraska House of Representatives in 1891, and re-elected in 1893. In November 1895, Cornish was elected district judge of Lancaster County, Nebraska. He was re-elected from time to time until January 1917, when he succeeded John B. Barnes as a member of the Nebraska Supreme Court, where he served until the date of his death.

Political offices
Preceded by John B. Barnes	Justice of the Nebraska Supreme Court; 1917–1920	Succeeded by Leonard A. Flansburg
