= Judge Hastings =

Judge Hastings may refer to:

- Alcee Hastings (1936–2021), judge of the United States District Court for the Southern District of Florida
- John Simpson Hastings (1898–1977), judge of the United States Court of Appeals for the Seventh Circuit

== See also ==
- Justice Hastings (disambiguation)
