= Edward R. Harden =

Nebraska judge (1815–1884)

Edward Randolph Harden (1815 – June 12, 1884) was a judicial appointee in 1854 for the Territorial Nebraska Supreme Court, serving in that capacity until 1860.

Born in Savannah, Georgia, Harden was a railroad station agent at the time of his appointment to the Nebraska court. He was a delegate from Georgia to the 1860 Democratic National Convention, and fought for the Confederate States Army in the American Civil War, achieving the rank of colonel. Following the war, he served as a county court judge in Georgia from 1872 until his death in 1884.

Political offices
Preceded by Newly established court	Justice of the Nebraska Supreme Court; 1854–1860	Succeeded by Court substantially reconstituted
