= Jeffrey J. Funke =

American judge (born 1969)

Jeffrey Funke

Chief Justice of the Nebraska Supreme Court
- Incumbent
- Assumed office November 1, 2024
- Appointed by: Jim Pillen
- Preceded by: Michael Heavican

Associate Justice of the Nebraska Supreme Court
- In office June 27, 2016 – October 31, 2024
- Appointed by: Pete Ricketts
- Preceded by: William M. Connolly
- Succeeded by: Jason Bergevin

Personal details
- Born: April 15, 1969 (age 56)
- Education: University of Nebraska–Lincoln (BS, JD)

Jeffrey J. Funke (born April 15, 1969) is an American lawyer who has served as the chief justice of the Nebraska Supreme Court since 2024. He previously served as an associate justice on the court from 2016 to 2024.

== Biography ==
Funke received his undergraduate degree from the University of Nebraska–Lincoln in 1991 and his Juris Doctor from the University of Nebraska College of Law in 1994.

After graduating law school, Funke worked in private practice and served as a county attorney and a deputy public defender.

=== State court service ===
Funke served as a county court judge from 2007 to 2013 in Otoe and Sarpy Counties. He served as a district court judge in Otoe and Cass Counties from 2013 to 2016. He was appointed county court judge in 2007 and district court judge in 2013 by former Governor Dave Heineman.

=== Nebraska Supreme Court ===
Funke was one of seven applicants who sought the open seat on the Nebraska Supreme Court. He was appointed to the Supreme Court on June 15, 2016, by Governor Pete Ricketts to succeed Justice William M. Connolly, who retired effective August 1, 2016. At the time of his appointment, Funke was the Court's youngest jurist.

On October 25, 2024, Governor Jim Pillen announced that he had chosen to elevate Funke to replace Michael Heavican as the chief justice of the Nebraska Supreme Court.

Legal offices
Preceded by William M. Connolly	Associate Justice of the Nebraska Supreme Court; 2016–2024	Succeeded by Jason Bergevin
Preceded by Michael Heavican	Chief Justice of the Nebraska Supreme Court; 2024–present	Incumbent
