= Samuel H. Sedgwick =

American judge (1848–1919)

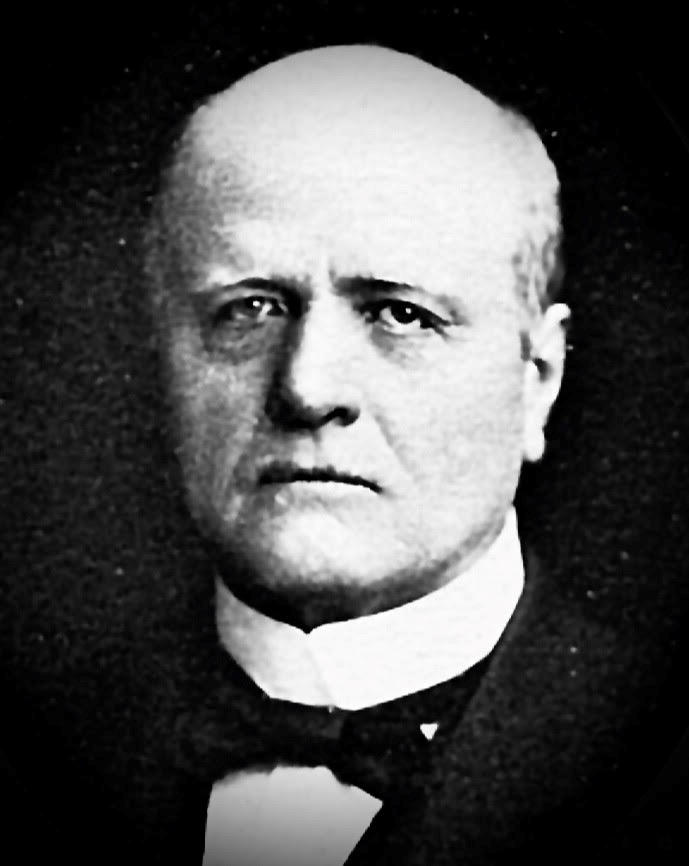
Nebraska Supreme Court Justice Samuel H. Sedgwick.

Samuel H. Sedgwick (March 12, 1848 – December 25, 1919) was a justice of the Nebraska Supreme Court from 1902 to 1908, and again from 1910 until his death in 1919, serving as chief justice from 1906 to 1908.

Born in Bloomingdale, Illinois, Sedgwick received a master's degree from Wheaton College and studied law at the University of Michigan before gaining admission to the bar in Wisconsin in 1874. After practicing law for a time in Kewaunee, Wisconsin, he moved to York, Nebraska in 1878, and practiced law there until his election to the Nebraska District Court in 1896.

From 1896 to 1900, Sedgwick was a Nebraska District Judge for District 5, residing in York. From 1901 to 1902, Sedgwick was a Supreme Court Commissioner.

Sedgwick served two terms on the Nebraska Supreme Court, and died in office. He died suddenly while having a cigar after dinner on Christmas Day.

Political offices
Preceded by T. L. Norval; James R. Dean	Justice of the Nebraska Supreme Court; 1902–1908; 1910–1919	Succeeded by Court restructured George A. Day
