= Ad Wenke =

American judge

Profile
- Position: Tackle

Personal information
- Born: January 22, 1898; Pender, Nebraska, US
- Died: March 3, 1961 (aged 63); Lincoln, Nebraska, US
- Listed height: 6 ft 4 in (1.93 m)
- Listed weight: 220 lb (100 kg)

Career information
- College: Nebraska

Career history
- Milwaukee Badgers (1923)

Career statistics
- Games played: 12
- Stats at Pro Football Reference

Adolph Eilert "Ad" Wenke (January 22, 1898 – March 3, 1961) was a player in the National Football League and a state supreme court justice in the state of Nebraska. Of German ancestry, Wenke played college football for the Nebraska Cornhuskers. He played with the Milwaukee Badgers during the 1923 NFL season. Wenke later became an attorney and a judge of the 9th Judicial District Court, and was appointed by Governor Dwight Griswold to serve as a justice of the Nebraska Supreme Court, from 1943 until his death in 1961.

Political offices
Preceded by George A. Eberly	Justice of the Nebraska Supreme Court; 1943–1961	Succeeded by Robert C. Brower
