= E. B. Chappell =

American judge (1889–1968)

Ellwood Blake Chappell (May 4, 1889 – October 18, 1968) was a justice of the Nebraska Supreme Court from 1943 to 1961.

Born in Osmond, Nebraska, Chappell "earned his way through high school by shining shoes" in a barber shop, and was later a barber during his college years. He received a B.A., an LL.B., and a degree in pharmacy from the University of Nebraska, in 1916.

He was a captain in the judge advocate department during World War I, and otherwise practiced law in Lincoln, Nebraska until 1923, when he was elected as a police judge.

In 1925, he became a municipal judge, and he was a district judge of the Nebraska Third District Court from 1929 to 1943. He was elected to the state supreme court in 1942, taking office the following year and serving until his retirement in 1961.

Chappell died in Nebraska at the age of 69.

Political offices
Preceded by William B. Rose	Justice of the Nebraska Supreme Court; 1943–1961	Succeeded by Harry A. Spencer
