= Jacob Fawcett =

American judge

The Honorable Jacob Fawcett

Acting Chief Justice of the Nebraska Supreme Court
- In office January 21, 1915 – January 25, 1915
- Preceded by: Conrad Hollenbeck
- Succeeded by: Andrew M. Morrissey

Justice of the Nebraska Supreme Court
- In office January 1, 1909 – January 4, 1917
- Appointed by: Ashton C. Shallenberger
- Preceded by: New court seat
- Succeeded by: James R. Dean

Personal details
- Born: April 9, 1847 Benton, Wisconsin Territory
- Died: April 19, 1928 (aged 81) Lincoln, Nebraska, U.S.
- Spouse: Margaret J. Doxey (m. 1868)

Military service
- Allegiance: United States
- Branch/service: United States Army; Union Army
- Unit: 16th Reg. Wis. Vol. Infantry
- Battles/wars: American Civil War

Jacob Fawcett (April 9, 1847 – April 19, 1928) was an American lawyer and jurist, who served eight years on the Nebraska Supreme Court (1909–1917), and was acting chief justice in 1915.

== Biography ==
Fawcett was born on April 9, 1847, to Joshua and Margaret Fawcett in Benton, Wisconsin. On April 16, 1868, he married Margaret J. Doxey.

== Career ==
Fawcett was admitted to the Illinois bar and practiced law. He served on the Galena, Illinois, city council. Fawcett was County Judge of Jo Daviess County, Illinois, from 1886 to 1887. He then served in the district court in Nebraska from 1896 to 1904. Sometime around 1901 Judge Fawcett along with judge Breen purchased the Psyche gold mine in Eastern Oregon. From 1908 to 1917, Fawcett was a justice of the Nebraska Supreme Court, serving as chief justice in 1915. Fawcett served in the Union Army, in the 16th Wisconsin Volunteer Infantry Regiment, during the American Civil War. Fawcett died on April 19, 1928, in Lincoln, Nebraska.

Legal offices
| New court seat | Justice of the Nebraska Supreme Court; January 1, 1909 – January 4, 1917 | Succeeded by James R. Dean |
| Preceded by Conrad Hollenbeck | Chief Justice of the Nebraska Supreme Court; January 21, 1915 – January 25, 1915 | Succeeded by Andrew M. Morrissey |
