= William C. Hastings =

American judge (1921–2010)

William Charles Hastings (January 31, 1921 – July 17, 2010) was a justice of the Nebraska Supreme Court from January 31, 1979 to September 2, 1987, and chief justice from then until his retirement in 1995.

Born in Newman Grove, Nebraska, Hastings attended Newman Grove High School and thereafter enrolled at the University of Nebraska, but his studies were interrupted by World War II. During the war, he worked for the Federal Bureau of Investigation as a fingerprint analyst, also serving in the United States Army. After the war, he returned to law school at the University of Nebraska College of Law and in 1948 became an attorney with a Nebraska firm. He also served stints as a part-time county court judge.

In 1965, Governor Frank B. Morrison appointed Hastings to a state district court judgeship for Lancaster County, Nebraska from 1965 to 1979. On January 31, 1979, Governor Charles Thone appointed Hastings to a seat on the Nebraska Supreme Court vacated by the retirement of Judge Harry A. Spencer. On September 2, 1987, Governor Kay A. Orr named Hastings to the office of Chief Justice following the resignation of Chief Justice Norman Krivosha. Hastings retired from the court in 1995.

Hastings died in Lincoln, Nebraska, at the age of 89.

Political offices
Preceded by Harry A. Spencer	Justice of the Nebraska Supreme Court; 1979–1987	Succeeded by Dale E. Fahrnbruch
Preceded by Norman Krivosha	Chief Justice of the Nebraska Supreme Court; 1987–1995	Succeeded by C. Thomas White
