= L. B. Day =

American politician and labor union leader (1932-1986)

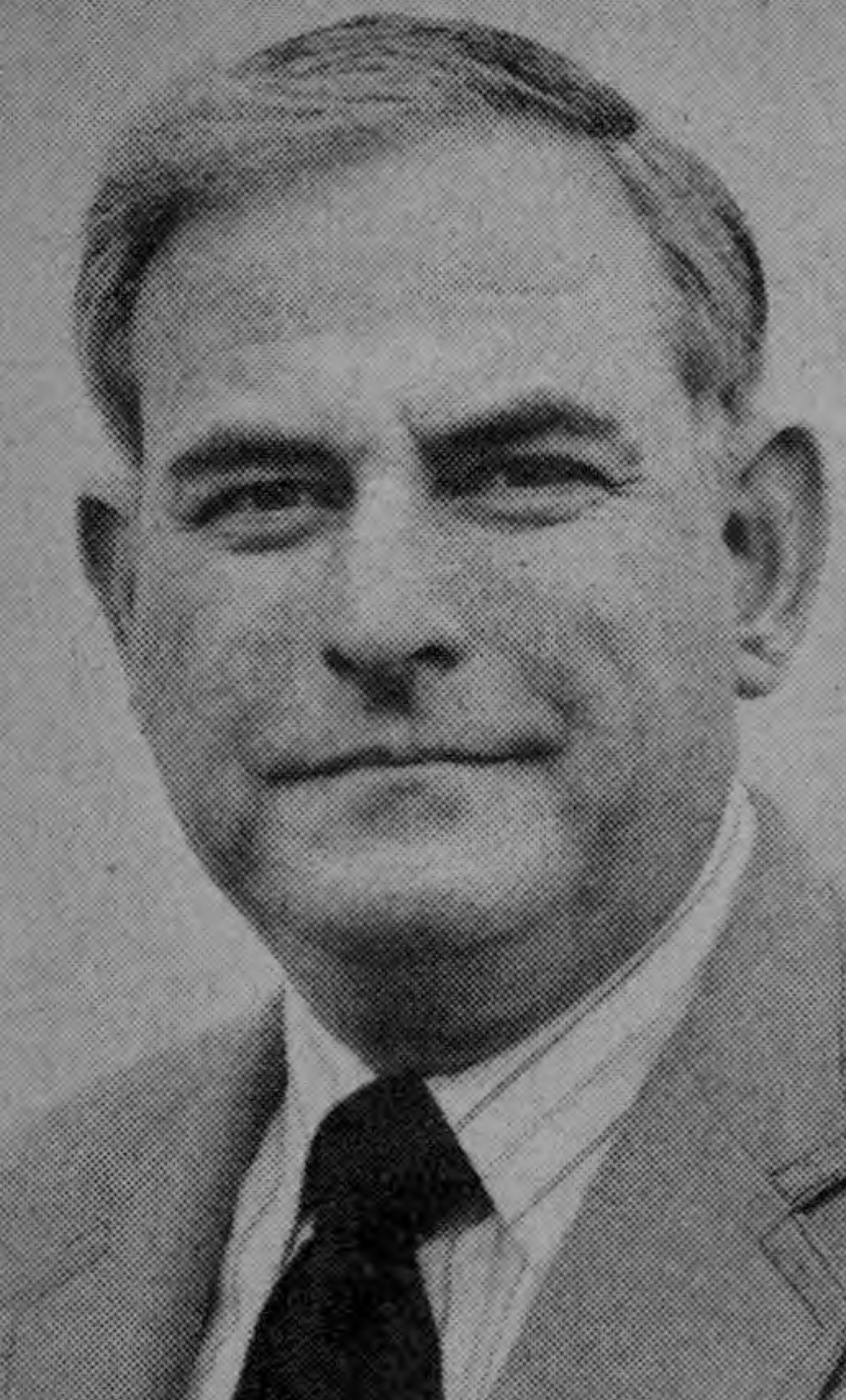

Personal details
- Born: February 22, 1932 Omaha, Nebraska, U.S.
- Died: October 24, 1986 (aged 54)
- Parent: L. B. Day (father)

L. B. Day (February 22, 1932 – October 24, 1986) was an American labor union leader and elected official in the state of Oregon. Day served as an International Brotherhood of Teamsters official, state representative, state senator, and appointed official in both the Oregon state executive office and the U.S. Department of the Interior. A longtime supporter of the Oregon State Fair, the L. B. Day Comcast Amphitheatre on the Oregon State Fairgrounds in Salem is named in his honor.

== Early life ==
Day was born in Omaha, Nebraska to Neva and L. B. Day (1889 – 1938), who was a Nebraska Supreme Court justice. Day attended the University of Nebraska for a year before moving to Oregon. He graduated from Willamette University in 1958, earning a B.A. in political science and history. He attended Willamette Law School for a year before turning his attention full-time to union activism.

== Teamsters activism ==
Day began working for Teamsters Local 670 in 1958. This local represented cannery workers in Oregon's Willamette Valley. Author Brent Walth noted that Day viewed his role with the Teamsters as a crusader, working to clean up a union often accused of connections to organized crime. Day's brother Frank noted Day's "talent for persuading people." Day quickly rose from working as a union organizer of cannery workers to serving as secretary-general of the local.

== Oregon House ==
Day was elected to the Oregon House of Representatives as a Democrat in 1964, representing Salem's House District 31. He was reelected in 1966 and 1968 before deciding to focus once more upon his union duties. In 1967, he switched parties and became a Republican. Walth describes this shift as one of practicality: "The Republicans were in charge of the house and L.B. Day wanted to win."

== Appointed positions ==
In 1970, Day was appointed as a regional director for the U.S. Department of the Interior under Interior Secretary Walter Hickel. When President Richard Nixon fired Hickel, Day returned to Oregon and was appointed soon after to serve as Governor Tom McCall's first director of the newly formed Oregon Department of Environmental Quality. During 1973 negotiations over Oregon's landmark comprehensive land-use planning legislation, Senate Bill 100, Day played a vital role in developing the compromises necessary to move SB 100 through the Senate. He then served as the first chairman of the new state Land Conservation and Development Commission in 1974.

== Oregon Senate ==
In 1977, Day was appointed to the Oregon State Senate to fill the term of Wallace Carson following Carson's appointment to the Marion County Circuit Court. He was reelected to District 16 of the Oregon Senate in his own right in 1978 and 1982. Day was running for reelection at the time of his death, from a heart attack suffered during a fundraiser for fellow Salem Republican C. T. "Cub" Houck.

== Reputation ==
Day was known as a hard working, irascible, and ornery public figure noted for his intensity. Governor Tom McCall once said of his friend and political ally, "You have to understand L. B. He starts negotiations at the death struggle." In the literature for his 1986 reelection campaign, Day admitted "I have been accused of being aggressive to a fault. No question that is a failing," he went on, "but my temperature rises when I see time wasted, money frittered away and elected officials dodging issues."

== Personal life ==
Day had a daughter, Melissa, from a brief first marriage. He and his wife Cindy had one son, Frank. "L. B." was his full given name. He served four years in the U.S. Navy. Despite his reputation as a ruthless politician, Day had a softer side — and a sense of humor. Each Christmas in the early 1980s, Day, Oregon Governor Victor Atiyeh, and Salem Statesman-Journal political columnist Ron Blankenbaker delivered Christmas presents to the needy using proceeds from "Pompous Twit" awards bestowed annually by Blankenbaker upon elected officials, journalists, and others. The "Twit of the Year" was asked to donate time and money to help the needy.
