= Stephanie F. Stacy =

American judge (born 1962)

Stephanie Stacy

Justice of the Nebraska Supreme Court
- Incumbent
- Assumed office September 28, 2015
- Appointed by: Pete Ricketts
- Preceded by: Kenneth Stephan

Personal details
- Born: April 23, 1962 (age 63)
- Education: University of Nebraska Omaha (BS); University of Nebraska–Lincoln (JD)

Stephanie Frazier Stacy (born April 23, 1962) is an American lawyer who has served as an associate justice of the Nebraska Supreme Court since 2015. She previously served as a judge on the Lancaster County District Court from 2011 to 2015. Stacy was appointed to the state's supreme court by the Governor Pete Ricketts in August 2015.

== Education ==
Stacy completed a Bachelor of Science in criminal justice at the University of Nebraska Omaha in 1988, and a Juris Doctor at the University of Nebraska College of Law in 1991. She clerked for U.S. magistrate judge Dave Piester of the United States District Court for the District of Nebraska in 1991–1993.

== Career ==
Stacy worked as an attorney in private practice in Lincoln, Nebraska from 1993 to 2011, rising to become a partner in the law firm Baylor, Evnen, Curtiss, Grimit & Witt LLP. She was a member of the Lincoln Bar Association's Board of Trustees from 2006 to 2009, and also taught law at the University of Nebraska–Lincoln in 2005–2011 as an adjunct faculty member.

In October 2011, Stacy was appointed by then-Governor Dave Heineman to serve as a judge on the District Court for Lancaster County, Nebraska, which encompasses Lincoln and surrounding areas. Lancaster County voters retained Stacy on the district court bench in 2014 with 77.8% of the vote.

Governor Pete Ricketts appointed Stacy to the Nebraska Supreme Court in 2015 to replace retiring justice Kenneth Stephan in representing the 1st Judicial District. Stacy's appointment was announced on August 14, and she was sworn in on September 28, 2015.

In 2018, Stacy was retained on the Nebraska Supreme Court with 81% of the vote. She will face another retention election in 2024. Because Nebraska's Supreme Court is divided into districts, only Lancaster County voters are able to vote on her retention.

Legal offices
Preceded by Kenneth Stephan	Associate Justice of the Nebraska Supreme Court; 2015–present	Incumbent
