= John V. Hendry =

American judge

Justice of the Nebraska Supreme Court
- In office 1998–2006
- Preceded by: Michael McCormack
- Succeeded by: Lindsey Miller-Lerman

Personal details
- Born: August 23, 1948 (age 76); Omaha, Nebraska, U.S.
- Education: University of Nebraska

John V. Hendry (born August 23, 1948) is a former chief justice of the Nebraska Supreme Court, appointed from the state at large in 1998. He received both a B.S. and J.D. from the University of Nebraska, and was admitted to the bar in 1974. He served as a County Court Judge of the Third District from 1995 to 1998. His service as Chief Justice ended October 2, 2006.

== See also ==
- Nebraska Supreme Court
