= John Freudenberg =

American judge (born 1969)

Justice of the Nebraska Supreme Court
- Incumbent
- Assumed office July 6, 2018
- Appointed by: Pete Ricketts
- Preceded by: John F. Wright

Personal details
- Born: November 12, 1969 (age 55)
- Education: Chadron State College (BA); University of Nebraska–Lincoln (JD)

John R. Freudenberg (born November 12, 1969) is an American lawyer who has served as an associate justice of the Nebraska Supreme Court since 2018.

== Early life, education, and legal career ==
Freudenberg attended Chadron State College for his undergraduate degree and the University of Nebraska College of Law for his Juris Doctor. He worked as a county attorney and later as Nebraska Assistant Attorney General. From 2007 to 2017, he was the Special Assistant United States Attorney for the District of Nebraska. He was appointed as a Lancaster County Judge in 2017.

== Nebraska Supreme Court tenure ==
Freudenberg was one of three finalists named for the vacancy. On June 18, 2018, Governor Pete Ricketts announced the appointment of Freudenberg the state Supreme Court. He fills the seat vacated due to the death of Associate Justice John F. Wright. This is Governor Ricketts’ fifth appointment to the Nebraska Supreme Court.

Legal offices
Preceded by John F. Wright	Associate Justice of the Nebraska Supreme Court; 2018–present	Incumbent
