= Hebron, Potter County, Pennsylvania =

Unincorporated community in Pennsylvania, U.S.

Coordinates: 41°50′31″N 78°04′00″W

Hebron is an unincorporated community in Potter County, in the U.S. state of Pennsylvania.

== History ==
A post office called Hebron was established in 1837, and remained in operation until it was discontinued in 1899. The community was named after the ancient city of Hebron.
