= Jonathan Papik =

American judge (born 1982)

Justice of the Nebraska Supreme Court
- Incumbent
- Assumed office May 7, 2018
- Appointed by: Pete Ricketts
- Preceded by: Max J. Kelch

Personal details
- Born: Jonathan James Papik; January 7, 1982 (age 43)
- Political party: Republican
- Education: University of Northwestern, St. Paul (BA); Harvard University (JD)

Jonathan James Papik (born January 7, 1982) is an associate justice of the Nebraska Supreme Court.

== Biography ==
Papik earned a Bachelor of Arts in history from University of Northwestern – St. Paul, graduating summa cum laude, and a Juris Doctor from Harvard Law School where he graduated magna cum laude. He clerked for then-Judge Neil Gorsuch of the United States Court of Appeals for the Tenth Circuit and Judge Laurence Silberman of the United States Court of Appeals for the District of Columbia Circuit. From 2010 to 2018, Papik was a partner at the law firm Cline, Williams, Wright, Johnson and Oldfather L.L.P. in Omaha. Papik was mentioned as a possible nominee for the United States Court of Appeals for the Eighth Circuit in 2017 for a vacant Nebraska seat but it ultimately went to Judge L. Steven Grasz.

== Nebraska Supreme Court tenure ==
Papik's name was among those of four candidates that was submitted to the governor from a nominating commission.

On March 21, 2018 Nebraska Governor Pete Ricketts announced the appointment of Papik to the state Supreme Court. He fills the seat vacated due to the resignation of Judge Max J. Kelch. Papik was Governor Ricketts’ fourth appointment to the Nebraska Supreme Court.

== Personal life ==
Papik grew up in Stromsburg, Nebraska. He and his wife, Rachel, have three children. He is a registered Republican.

Legal offices
Preceded by Max J. Kelch	Associate Justice of the Nebraska Supreme Court; 2018–present	Incumbent
