= Jack O'Sullivan (Australian footballer) =

Australian rules footballer, born 1906

Personal information
- Full name: Jack O'Sullivan
- Born: 11 June 1906
- Died: 18 June 1972 (aged 66)

Playing career^{1}
Years	Club	Games (Goals)
1926–27	North Melbourne	9 (5)
- ^{1} Playing statistics correct to the end of 1927.

Jack O'Sullivan (the Bosco) (11 June 1906 – 18 June 1972) was an Australian rules footballer who played with North Melbourne in the Victorian Football League (VFL). He won the Wangaratta Gift in 1927 and 1929.
