= Jack Sullivan Jr. =

Australian rules footballer

Jack Sullivan

Personal information
- Full name: John D. "Jack" Sullivan
- Born: 11 August 1933
- Died: 2 September 2002 (aged 69)
- Original team: St Joseph’s CYMS (CYMSFA)
- Height: 175 cm (5 ft 9 in)
- Weight: 72 kg (159 lb)

Playing career^{1}
Years	Club	Games (Goals)
1955–60	Carlton	66 (21)
- ^{1} Playing statistics correct to the end of 1960.

Jack Sullivan (11 August 1933 – 2 September 2002) was an Australian rules footballer who played with Carlton in the Victorian Football League (VFL).
