= John F. Wright =

American judge

John F. Wright (December 24, 1945 – March 18, 2018) was an American court justice of the Nebraska Supreme Court, appointed by Governor Ben Nelson in 1994. Wright was born in Scottsbluff, Nebraska. He received his bachelor's degree and law degree from the University of Nebraska College of Law. He served in the Nebraska National Guard from 1970 to 1976. Wright practiced law from 1970 to 1991. In 1991, Wright was appointed to the Nebraska State Court of Appeals. Wright died after a long illness on March 18. 2018.

== See also ==
- Nebraska Supreme Court
- Nebraska State Court of Appeals
