= Johnny Sullivan =

English boxer

Personal information
- Nickname: John Hallmark
- Nationality: English
- Born: 19 December 1932 England
- Died: 4 February 2003 (aged 70)
- Weight: middle/light heavyweight

Boxing career

Boxing record
- Total fights: 97
- Wins: 68 (KO 36)
- Losses: 26 (KO 5)
- Draws: 3

Johnny Sullivan (19 December 1932 – 4 February 2003) was an English professional middle/light heavyweight boxer of the 1940s, '50s and '60s who won the British Boxing Board of Control (BBBofC) British middleweight title, and British Empire middleweight title, his professional fighting weight varied from 149 lb (68 kg; 10 st 9 lb), i.e. middleweight to 174 1/2 lb (79.2 kg; 12 st 6.5 lb), i.e. light heavyweight.
