= Kenneth C. Stephan =

American judge

Associate Justice of the Nebraska Supreme Court
- In office 1997 – July 1, 2015
- Appointed by: Ben Nelson
- Preceded by: John M. Gerrard
- Succeeded by: Michael McCormack

Personal details
- Born: October 8, 1946 (age 79)
- Education: University of Nebraska (BA, JD)

Kenneth C. Stephan (born October 8, 1946) is a former justice of the Nebraska Supreme Court, appointed by Governor Ben Nelson in 1997. He received both his B.A. and his J.D. degree from the University of Nebraska. He worked as a private practice attorney from 1973 until he was appointed to the court.

== See also ==
- Nebraska Supreme Court
