= Jason Bergevin =

American judge

Justice of the Nebraska Supreme Court
- Incumbent
- Assumed office January 2, 2025
- Appointed by: Jim Pillen
- Preceded by: Jeffrey J. Funke

Personal details
- Born: Jason Michael Bergevin; 1974 (age 50–51) Omaha, Nebraska, U.S.
- Education: University of Nebraska–Lincoln (BS); Western New England University (JD)

Jason Michael Bergevin (born 1974) is an American lawyer who has served as an associate justice of the Nebraska Supreme Court since 2025.

== Early life, education, and legal career ==
Bergevin attended the University of Nebraska–Lincoln for his undergraduate degree, graduating in 1997 with a degree in secondary education, and Western New England University School of Law for his Juris Doctor, graduating in 2005.

After graduating from law school, Bergevin worked as a deputy county attorney from 2005 to 2009 in Weld County, Colorado. He later worked as an instructor of paralegal studies at Kaplan University and as a deputy county attorney in Lancaster County, Nebraska, from 2009 to 2011. From 2011 to 2016, he served as an assistant staff to judge advocate in the United States Air Force Reserve and later, from 2016 to 2022, as a deputy staff judge advocate in the Nebraska Air National Guard. From 2015 to 2022, Bergevin served as an assistant attorney general in the office of the Nebraska Attorney General.

In 2022, Nebraska governor Pete Ricketts appointed Bergevin to serve as a Nebraska district court judge in the fifth judicial district in Platte County, Nebraska.

== Nebraska Supreme Court tenure ==
On January 2, 2025, Governor Jim Pillen announced the appointment of Bergevin to the Nebraska Supreme Court to succeed Justice Jeffrey J. Funke, who was elevated to chief justice.

Legal offices
| Preceded by Jeffrey J. Funke | Associate Justice of the Nebraska Supreme Court; 2025–present | Incumbent |
