= Frederick Messmore =

American judge (1889–1969)

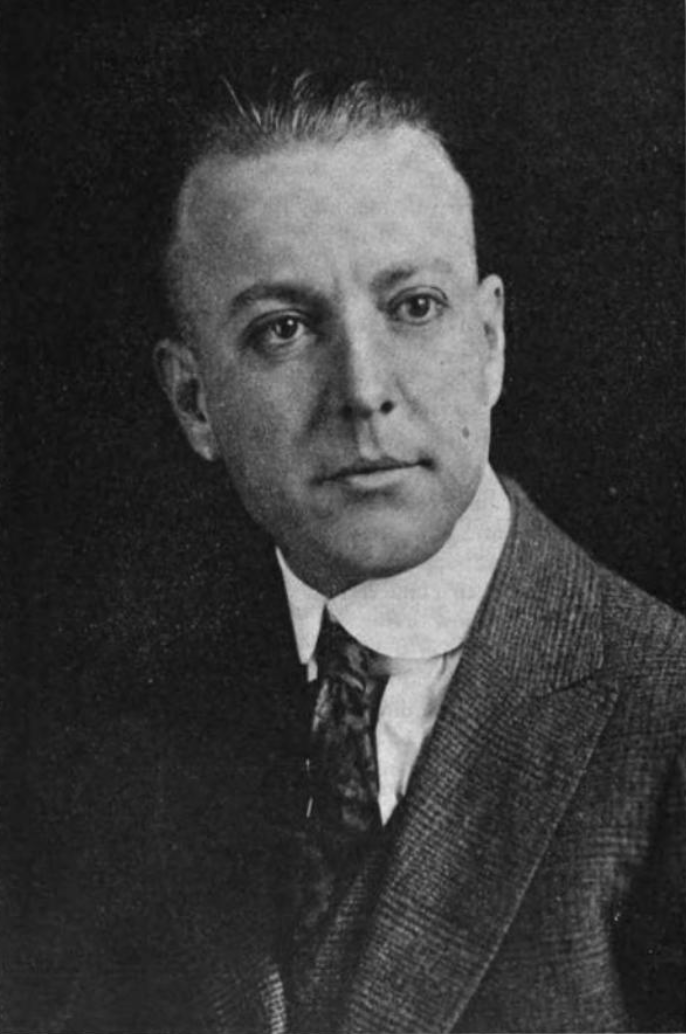
Frederick Messmore in 1918.

Frederick W. Messmore (July 11, 1889 – June 24, 1969) was a long-serving Justice of the Nebraska Supreme Court. He was appointed on August 9, 1937, to fill a vacancy created by the death of Judge Edward E. Good, and served until 1965.

== Early life, education, and career ==
Born in Boone County, Iowa, to H. A. and Clara J. (Davidson) Messmore, descendants of pioneers of the state, Messmore attended the public schools of Council Bluffs, Iowa, where he graduated from high school, and also attended Northwestern Business and Normal College. He moved with his family to Nebraska around 1907 or 1908. He established his residence at Randolph, Cedar County, where he successfully ran a hotel, later continuing in the same line of business in several other cities. He received an LL.B. from Creighton Law School in Omaha 1912, and gained admission to the bar in Nebraska shortly thereafter.

== Legal and judicial career ==
In 1913, he associated himself with the practice of General Leonard Wright Colby of Beatrice, Nebraska, one of the leading members of the Gage County bar. Messmore maintained this status until his election to the office of county attorney, in 1914, at which time he was one of the youngest county attorneys in the state. He was re-elected in 1916, serving until 1918. He then served as a county judge from 1921 to 1929, and as a district judge of the 18th district from 1928 until he was appointed an associate justice of the Nebraska Supreme Court in 1937. He served on the Supreme Court bench for 28 years, until his retirement in 1965.

== Personal life ==
In April, 1913, Messmore married Jennie Frances Saxe of Belden, Cedar County, Nebraska.

He died in Beatrice, several weeks short of his eightieth birthday, and was eulogized by the court in a memorial held the following year.

Political offices
Preceded by Edward E. Good	Justice of the Nebraska Supreme Court; 1937–1965	Succeeded by Hale McCown
