= John O'Sullivan =

John O'Sullivan may refer to:

== Sports ==
- John O'Sullivan (cricketer) (1918–1991), New Zealand cricketer
- John O'Sullivan (cyclist) (1933–2023), Australian cyclist
- John O'Sullivan (footballer, born 1993), Irish footballer for Shelbourne
- John O'Sullivan (footballer, born 2006), Irish footballer for Shamrock Rovers
- John O'Sullivan (rugby league) (1950–2018), New Zealand rugby league footballer
- John O'Sullivan (rugby union) (born 1980), Irish rugby union footballer
- John Lack O'Sullivan (1976–2002), Gaelic footballer and Australian rules footballer

== Politics and government ==
- John O'Sullivan (Cork politician) (1901–1990), Irish Fine Gael Party politician, Senator, later TD for Cork South-West
- John O'Sullivan (Illinois politician), member of the Illinois House of Representatives
- John C. O'Sullivan (1841–?), politician in Ontario, Canada
- John M. O'Sullivan (1881–1948), Irish Cumann na nGaedhael/Fine Gael politician, TD, cabinet minister and academic

== Other ==
- John O'Sullivan (columnist) (born 1942), British conservative columnist and editor
- John O'Sullivan (engineer), Australian astronomer and electrical engineer, and one of the inventors of Wi-Fi
- Sir John O'Sullivan (soldier) (1700–1760), Irish soldier, Quartermaster general to Prince Charles Edward Stewart during the Jacobite Rising of 1745
- John Francis O'Sullivan (1850–1907), Irish-American awarded the Medal of Honor during the Indian Wars
- John L. O'Sullivan (1813–1895), journalist who popularized the phrase "Manifest Destiny"

== See also ==
- John Sullivan (disambiguation)
