= Paul E. Boslaugh =

American judge (1881–1964)

Associate Justice of the Nebraska Supreme Court
- In office 1949 – January 1961
- Preceded by: Bayard H. Paine
- Succeeded by: Leslie Boslaugh

Personal details
- Born: 1881 Mapleton, Iowa
- Died: June 28, 1965 Hastings, Nebraska
- Spouse: Anne V. Boslaugh
- Children: Leslie Boslaugh, Genevieve Boslaugh
- Education: University of Nebraska College of Law (LL.B., 1903)
- Occupation: Lawyer, judge

Paul E. Boslaugh (June 13, 1881 – June 29, 1964) was an American lawyer and judge who served as an associate justice of the Nebraska Supreme Court from 1949 until his retirement in 1961. He was succeeded on the court by his son, Leslie Boslaugh.

== Early life, education, and career ==
Born near Mapleton, Iowa, to a family of farmers, According to an interview his son Leslie Boslaugh, he studied at Drake University, but did not like it and moved to Nebraska. Boslaugh graduated from the University of Nebraska College of Law in 1903 and gained admission to the bar in Nebraska that same year.

Boslaugh began practicing law in Harvard, Nebraska, in association with L. G. Hurd, who was later elected to the district court bench. In 1913, Boslaugh moved to Hastings, Nebraska, where he entered into partnership with Judge L. B. Stiner, later joined by their respective sons, Leslie Boslaugh and Lester Stiner. Among his most prominent cases before joining the bench was his representation of the State of Nebraska in the John O'Connor Estate litigation, a long-running matter in the state's courts. He was also an attorney for the Central Nebraska Public Power and Irrigation District.

Outside of his legal practice, Boslaugh was president of the Nebraska State Bar Association in 1942, a member of the Judicial Council of Nebraska from 1941 to 1950, and served in the House of Delegates of the American Bar Association from 1942 to 1954. He also acted as a consultant to the 1943 Nebraska Statute Revision Commission. He also served for 21 years on the Hastings Board of Education and held leadership roles in the Chamber of Commerce and Rotary Club.

== Judicial service ==
In 1948, Boslaugh was elected to the Nebraska Supreme Court, where he served from January 1949 until January 1961. During his twelve years on the bench he was noted for his diligence, attending every session, consultation, and meeting of the court. Barred from further service by age restrictions, he retired in 1961. His last official act as a justice was to administer the oath of office to his son, Leslie Boslaugh, who succeeded him on the court.

== Personal life and death ==
Boslaugh married Ann Herzog in 1910, with whom he had a son, Leslie, and a daughter, Genevieve. Leslie succeeded him on the Nebraska Supreme Court. Genevieve became a teacher in North Platte.

After retiring from the court, Boslaugh resumed private practice in Hastings, where he died in 1964, at the age of 83. Funeral services were held at the Butler–Volland Funeral Home in Hastings, with burial in Parkview Cemetery.

In January 1966 the Nebraska Supreme Court held a memorial session honoring Boslaugh, recognizing his contributions to the law and to the legal profession. The court described him as a lawyer who "often times remarked there was no other occupation to which a man could devote his life that afforded more satisfaction than to aid in the solution of the legal questions arising out of the business of men".

Political offices
Preceded by Bayard H. Paine	Justice of the Nebraska Supreme Court; 1949–1961	Succeeded by Leslie Boslaugh
