= Jack Sullivan (footballer, born 1879) =

Australian rules footballer

Personal information
- Full name: Jack Sullivan
- Born: 30 September 1879
- Died: 30 August 1957 (aged 77)
- Original team: Nagambie

Playing career^{1}
Years	Club	Games (Goals)
1903, 1907	Essendon	2 (1)
- ^{1} Playing statistics correct to the end of 1907.

Jack Sullivan (30 September 1879 – 30 August 1957) was an Australian rules footballer who played with Essendon in the Victorian Football League (VFL).
