= William A. Little (Nebraska judge) =

American judge (c. 1832–1867)

William A. Little (c. 1832 – May 20, 1867) was elected as Chief Justice of the Nebraska Supreme Court in 1867 but died before he qualified. After reading law with Judge Parks of Aurora, Illinois, Little moved to Omaha, Nebraska, in 1856 and entered the practice of law there, in which he "soon rose to the highest eminence in the profession", remaining so for ten years. He served in the Nebraska Legislature for several years, and in 1866 defeated Oliver P. Mason to be elected chief justice of the state supreme court, the only Democrat to win in that election. However, he became ill, apparently with tuberculosis, and returned to Illinois "to die among his kindred". His seat on the supreme court was then filled by the appointment of Mason.

Little died in Clinton, Illinois, at the home of his brother, at around the age of 35.

Political offices
| Preceded by Newly established court | Justice of the Nebraska Supreme Court; 1867–1867 | Succeeded by Oliver P. Mason |
