= John Sullivan (Gloucestershire cricketer) =

English cricketer (1948–2023)

Personal information
- Full name: John Patrick Sullivan
- Born: 11 March 1948; Bristol, England
- Died: 3 June 2023 (aged 75)
- Batting: Right-handed
- Role: All-Rounder

Domestic team information
- Years: Team
- 1968–1977: Gloucestershire

Career statistics
Competition	FC	List A
Matches	23	15
Runs scored	480	95
Batting average	12.30	10.55
100s/50s	0/1	0/0
Top score	53	24
Balls bowled	66	54
Wickets	2	2
Bowling average	25.00	50.00
5 wickets in innings
10 wickets in match
Best bowling	2/50	1/38
Catches/stumpings	14/0	2/0
- Source: Cricinfo, 30 July 2013

John Patrick Sullivan (11 March 1948 – 3 June 2023) was an English cricketer. He played for Gloucestershire between 1968 and 1977. A right handed batsman, bowler and occasional wicketkeeper. Sullivan represented Gloucestershire for 9 years and during this time they won two major trophies, the Gillette Cup in 1973 and the Benson and Hedges in 1977 and also finished runners-up in the County Championship in 1968. In 1976, Sullivan was selected to play for the National Cricket Association against the touring West Indian side at the Oval, which included the likes of Sir Vivian Richards, Michael Holding and Alvin Kaĺlicharran to name but a few.

Sullivan died in June 2023, at the age of 75.
