= Robert G. Simmons =

American judge

Robert Glenmore Simmons
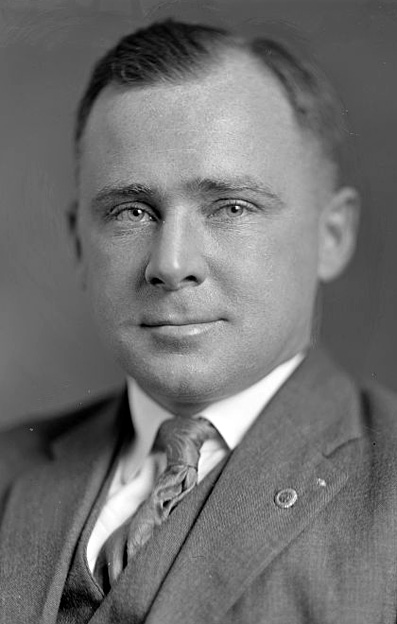

23rd Chief Justice of Nebraska
- In office 1939–1963
- Appointed by: Robert Leroy Cochran
- Preceded by: Charles A. Goss
- Succeeded by: Paul W. White

Member of the U.S. House of Representatives from Nebraska's 6th district
- In office March 4, 1923 – March 3, 1933
- Preceded by: Augustin Humphrey
- Succeeded by: Constituency abolished

Personal details
- Born: December 25, 1891 Scottsbluff, Nebraska, U.S.
- Died: December 27, 1969 (aged 78) Lincoln, Nebraska, U.S.
- Party: Republican
- Education: Hastings College; University of Nebraska–Lincoln

Robert Glenmore Simmons (December 25, 1891 – December 27, 1969) was a Nebraska Republican politician.

Simmons was born on December 25, 1891, near Scottsbluff, Nebraska. He attended Hastings College from 1909 to 1911 and the University of Nebraska–Lincoln in 1915. He was admitted to the bar in 1915 and set up practice in Gering, Nebraska. He was elected prosecuting attorney of Scotts Bluff County in 1916. During the first World War, on October 15, 1917, he enlisted in the army. He was commissioned as a second lieutenant in the Air Service on March 12, 1918, and was discharged on January 14, 1919.

Simmons was elected as a Republican to the 68th through 72nd Congresses (March 4, 1923 – March 3, 1933) to represent Nebraska's 6th district. When Nebraska lost a district, he ran and lost in the preceding new district in 1932. He ran for the United States Senate in 1934 against Edward R. Burke and in 1936 against George W. Norris, losing both times. He resumed practicing law in Lincoln, Nebraska.

Simmons was elected chief justice of the Supreme Court of Nebraska in 1938. He was also a deputy judge in the administrative tribunal of the International Labour Organization in Geneva, Switzerland, in 1955. While serving as Chief Justice, along with the chief justices of New Jersey, Arthur T. Vanderbilt, and Missouri, Laurance M. Hyde, he co-founded the Conference of Chief Justices in 1949. He retired in January 1963 after twenty-four years as the chief justice of Nebraska.

He returned to private law in Lincoln, Nebraska. He died in Lincoln on December 27, 1969, and is interred in Fairview Cemetery, Scottsbluff.

He was a Congregationalist, a member of the American Bar Association, a member of the Order of the Coif, a member of the American Legion, a Freemason and a Shriner.

U.S. House of Representatives
Preceded by Augustin Reed Humphrey	Member of the U.S. House of Representatives from Nebraska's 6th congressional district March 4, 1923 – March 3, 1933	Succeeded by District abolished
Political offices
Preceded by Charles A. Goss	Chief Justice of the Nebraska Supreme Court; 1939–1963	Succeeded by Paul W. White
Party political offices
Preceded by J.H. Kemp	Republican nominee for U.S. Senator from Nebraska (Class 1); 1934 (regular)	Succeeded by Hugh Butler
Preceded by George W. Norris	Republican nominee for U.S. Senator from Nebraska (Class 2); 1936	Succeeded by Kenneth S. Wherry
