= William A. Little (Georgia judge) =

American judge (1838–1924)

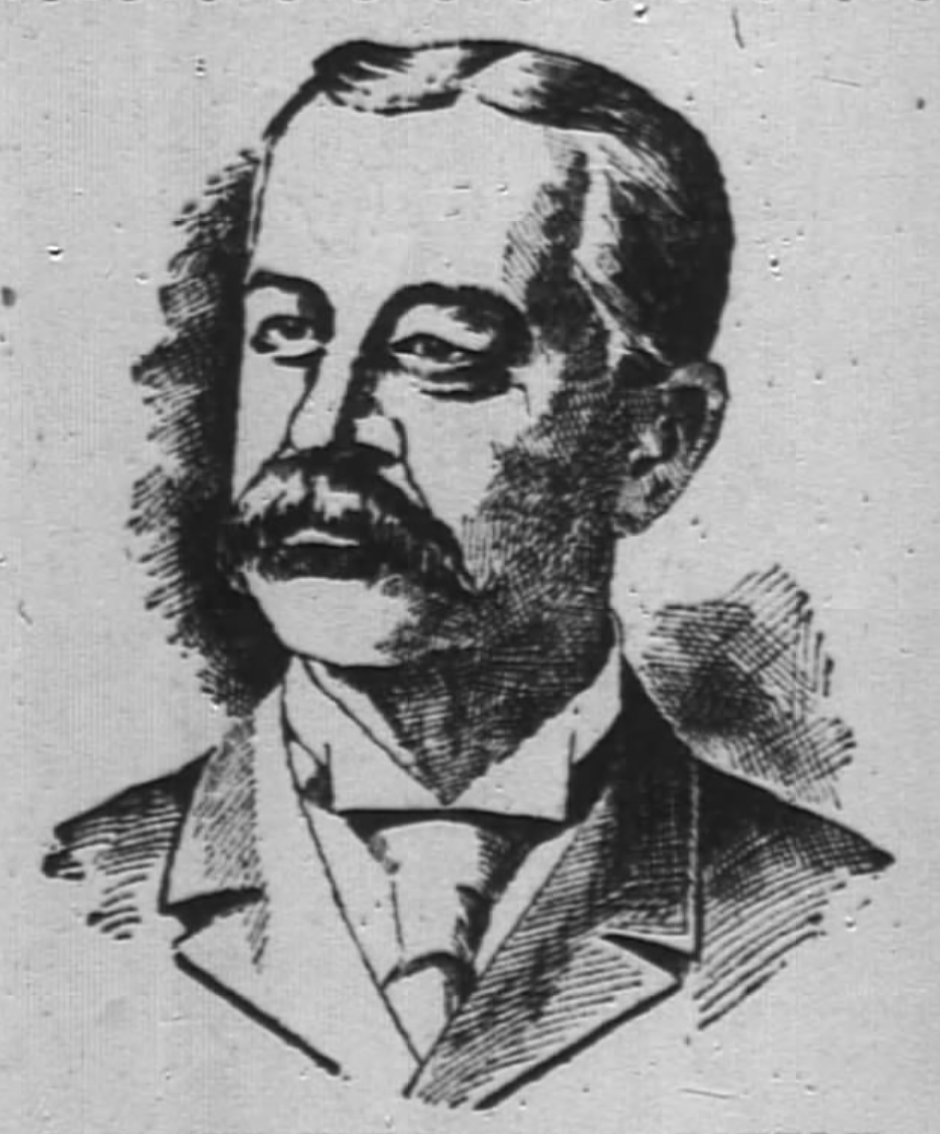
Georgia Supreme Court Justice William A. Little

William Augustus Little (November 6, 1838 – February 28, 1924) was a justice of the Supreme Court of Georgia from 1897 to 1903.

== Early life, education, and military service ==
Born in Talbot County, Georgia, Little was educated at the Collingsworth institute in Talbotton, Georgia, and attended private schools at Macon. He entered the University of Georgia with the class of 1857, but later withdrew to attend Oglethorpe University, from which he graduated in 1858. He gained admission to the bar that same year, and then entered Yale College, but withdrew to join the Confederate States Army at the outbreak of the American Civil War, in which he was "a captain of cavalry in the Confederate Army", in the 10th Georgia Regiment.

== Legal and political career ==
Little entered the practice of law in Talbot County, and shortly thereafter was elected solicitor of the county court. In 1872 he was appointed solicitor general of the Chattooga circuit; in 1877 he moved to Columbus, and was elected as a delegate to the constitutional convention, and served in the Georgia House of Representatives, of which he was speaker from 1884 to 1887. In 1891, he became Attorney General of Georgia, and was later appointed as an assistant attorney general of the United States. On December 16, 1896, while holding this office, pursuant to a constitutional restructuring of the state supreme court, Little was elected to the state supreme court as a Democrat, along with Samuel Lumpkin, Andrew J. Cobb, and William H. Fish, all elected "practically without opposition". Little was re-elected in 1900 to a six-year term, but resigned from the court on January 1, 1903, due to poor health. He was succeeded on the court by Joseph Rucker Lamar, who would later serve on the Supreme Court of the United States.

Little retired from active practice in 1913 because of ill health. He was at that time a judge on the Chattahoochee circuit bench, a position he had held for a number of years.

== Personal life and death ==
Little married Virginia Dozier, with whom he had a son, John D. Little, who became a prominent attorney in Atlanta. Virginia Little died on April 4, 1912, at the age of 67. Little died at his home in Columbus, Georgia, at the age of 85, and was buried beside his wife at Linwood Cemetery.

Political offices
Preceded by Newly reconfigured court	Justice of the Supreme Court of Georgia; 1897–1903	Succeeded by Joseph Rucker Lamar
