= William M. Connolly =

American judge

William M. Connolly (born March 31, 1938) is a former justice of the Nebraska Supreme Court, appointed by Governor Ben Nelson in 1994. He attended Creighton University for both his undergraduate studies and his law degree. He is also a graduate of Creighton Preparatory School, class of 1956. He worked as the County Attorney of Adams County from 1967 to 1972, and was a Nebraska State Court of Appeals judge from 1992 to 1994. He has four children and six grandchildren.

== See also ==
- Nebraska Supreme Court
- Nebraska State Court of Appeals

== Sources ==
- "William M. Connolly - District 5". March 5, 2010. Archived from the original on May 27, 2010.
