= John Joseph Sullivan (judge) =

American judge (1855–1926)

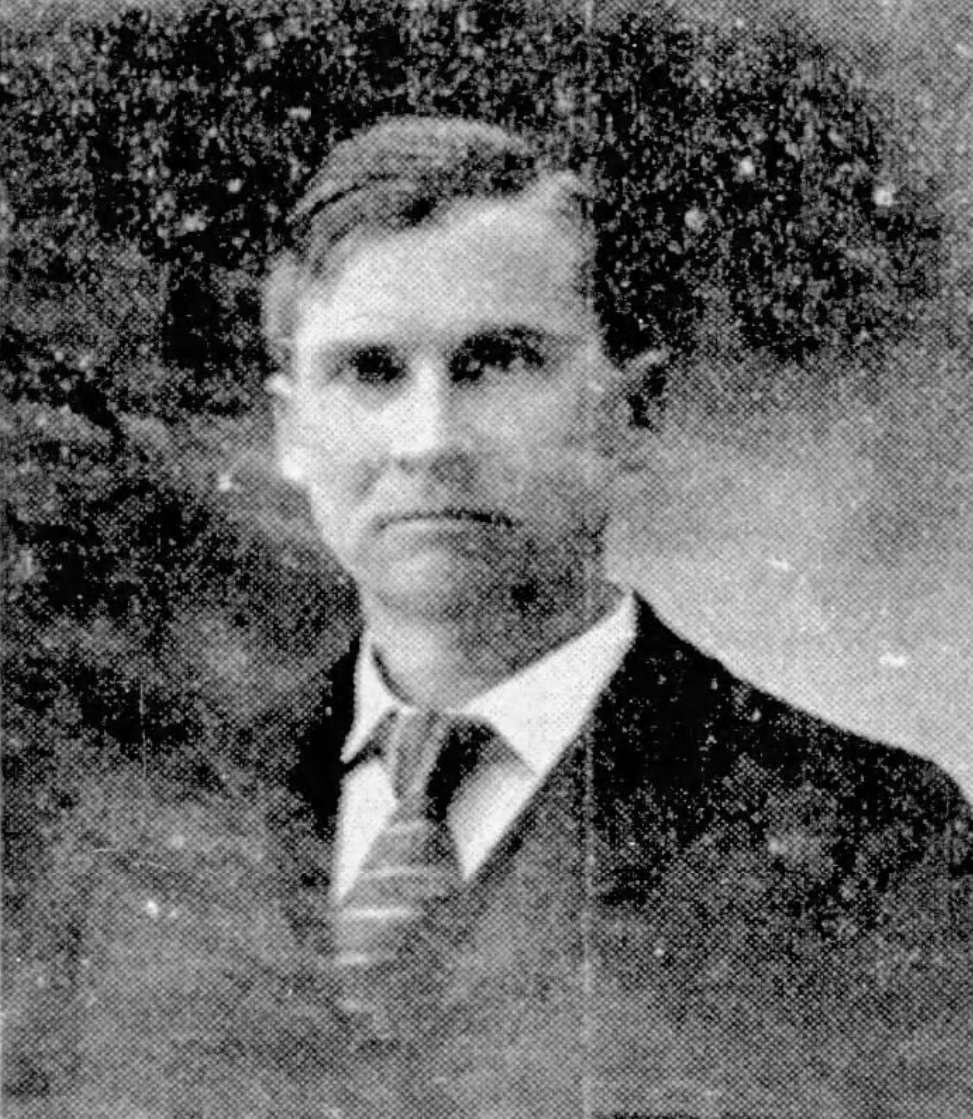
Justice John Joseph Sullivan

John Joseph Sullivan (1855–1926) was an associate justice and chief justice of the Nebraska Supreme Court.

Raised in Harvard, McHenry, Illinois, Sullivan read law in a private office and studied at the University of Iowa to receive an LL.B. He began the practice of law at Harvard, McHenry, Illinois, in 1878, moving to Columbus, Nebraska in 1879 and serving there as city attorney for several years. He then served as County Judge of Platte County from 1883 to 1886. He was a district judge of the Nebraska 6th District from 1892 to 1897, when he was nominated by a coalition of Populists, Democrats and Silver Republicans to be their candidate for election to the Nebraska Supreme Court. Sullivan was "the first democrat to occupy a seat on the supreme bench of Nebraska", and was "swept in on the crest of the Democratic-Populist fusion waves of 1898 and 1900", defeating his strongest rival, Republican Alfred M. Post, by a vote of 102,828 to 89,009. He served as an associate justice of the Nebraska Supreme Court from 1898 to 1902, and as chief justice from 1902 to 1904. Following his retirement from the Court, Sullivan twice declined to be appointed to vacancies on the Court.

In January, 1907, Sullivan entered into a law partnership with attorneys Louis Lightner and James G. Reeder in the firm of Sullivan, Reeder & Lightner. Sullivan retired from the firm in 1912. His burial location is unknown.
