= Jack Sullivan (baseball) =

American baseball player (1873–1924)

- Image from Chicago Daily News negatives collection, Chicago History Museum.
- Catcher
- Born: February 16, 1873; Chicago
- Died: June 5, 1924 (aged 51); St. Paul, Minnesota
- Batted: Right Threw: Right

MLB debut
- April 19, 1905, for the Detroit Tigers

Last MLB appearance
- September 5, 1908, for the Pittsburgh Pirates

MLB statistics
- Batting average: .152
- Home runs: 0
- Runs batted in: 4
- Stats at Baseball Reference

Teams
- Detroit Tigers (1905); Pittsburgh Pirates (1908)

John Eugene Sullivan (February 16, 1873 – June 5, 1924), was an American baseball catcher. He played professional baseball from 1900 to 1910, including two seasons in Major League Baseball for the Detroit Tigers in 1905 and the Pittsburgh Pirates in 1908. He collected 59 putouts and 24 assists, and committed 3 errors, in 13 games as a major league catcher. He batted and threw right-handed.

== Early years ==
Sullivan in Chicago in 1873. He began playing baseball on the Chicago sandlots.

== Professional baseball ==
=== Minor leagues ===
Sullivan began playing professional baseball in 1899 with a club in St. Thomas, Ontario. In 1900, he played for the Kansas City Blues of the American League (one year before the league was recognized as a major league). He played catcher and first base for the Blues, compiling a .227 batting average in seven games.

He joined the Denver Grizzlies of the Western League in the middle of the 1900 season and remained with the club through the 1901 season. He appeared in 58 games for the Grizzlies in 1900 and compiled a .329 batting average with five triples and six stolen bases. He spent the 1902 season with the Helena Senators of the Pacific Northwest League.

=== St. Paul Saints ===
In 1903, he joined the St. Paul Saints of the American Association. He spent three years with the Saints and helped lead the club to three consecutive American Association championships from 1903 to 1905.

=== Detroit Tigers ===
Sullivan was acquired by the Detroit Tigers after the 1904 season. The Tiger sent him a contract with a salary of $1,800 for the 1905 season. Sullivan tore the contract into pieces on seeing the proposed salary. He eventually reached terms with the Tigers and made his major league debut on April 19, 1905. However, he appeared in only 13 games for the club, compiling a .156 batting average and a .250 on-base percentage in 32 at bats. He also gave up four passed balls in a game against Chicago on April 23. In late May 1905, the Tigers released Sullivan back to St. Paul.

=== Kansas City Blues ===
In 1906, Sullivan joined for the Kansas City Blues, then playing in the American Association. He remained with Kansas City for four seasons, batting .162 in 1906, .223 in 1907, .228 in 1908, and .219 in 1909.

=== Pittsburgh Pirates ===
Late in the 1908 season, Sullivan was sold to the Pittsburgh Pirates. He appeared in his only game for Pittsburgh on September 5, 1908, and had only a single plate appearance. He refused to sign a contract at the proposed rate of $350 per month and was sent back to Kansas City. Sullivan told the Kansas City Star that Pittsburgh's owner "offered me the same salary I was making in Kansas City, and that didn't go with me. . . . I'd rather play ball right here in this league where all my friends are and the only thing that would've kept me in Pittsburgh was more money."

=== New England League ===
Sullivan concluded his playing career playing in the New England League at the end of the 1910 season.

== Later years ==
Sullivan moved to Minneapolis in approximately 1919. In June 1924, he collapsed and died within three minutes while playing in a practice game of baseball at Shaw Field, Macalester College, Saint Paul, Minnesota. Heart disease, aggravated by strenuous exercise, was the cause of death. He was buried at Calvary Catholic Cemetery in Evanston, Illinois.
