= Michael McCormack (judge) =

American judge (born 1939)

Michael McCormack (born July 20, 1939) is a retired justice of the Nebraska Supreme Court, appointed by Governor Ben Nelson in 1997. He graduated from Creighton University School of Law in 1963 as well as graduating from Creighton Preparatory School in 1957 and worked as an Assistant Public Defender in Douglas County from 1963 to 1966. He then worked as an attorney in a private practice until being appointed to the Court.

== See also ==
- Nebraska Supreme Court
