= Nebraska Supreme Court =

Highest court in the State of Nebraska

Coordinates: 40.808090°N 96.699587°W

- Interactive map of Nebraska Supreme Court
- Established: 1854
- Jurisdiction: Nebraska
- Location: Lincoln, Nebraska
- Composition method: Missouri Plan
- Authorised by: Nebraska Constitution
- Appeals to: Supreme Court of the United States
- Number of positions: 7
- Website: Official Website

Chief Justice
- Currently: Jeffrey J. Funke
- Since: November 1, 2024

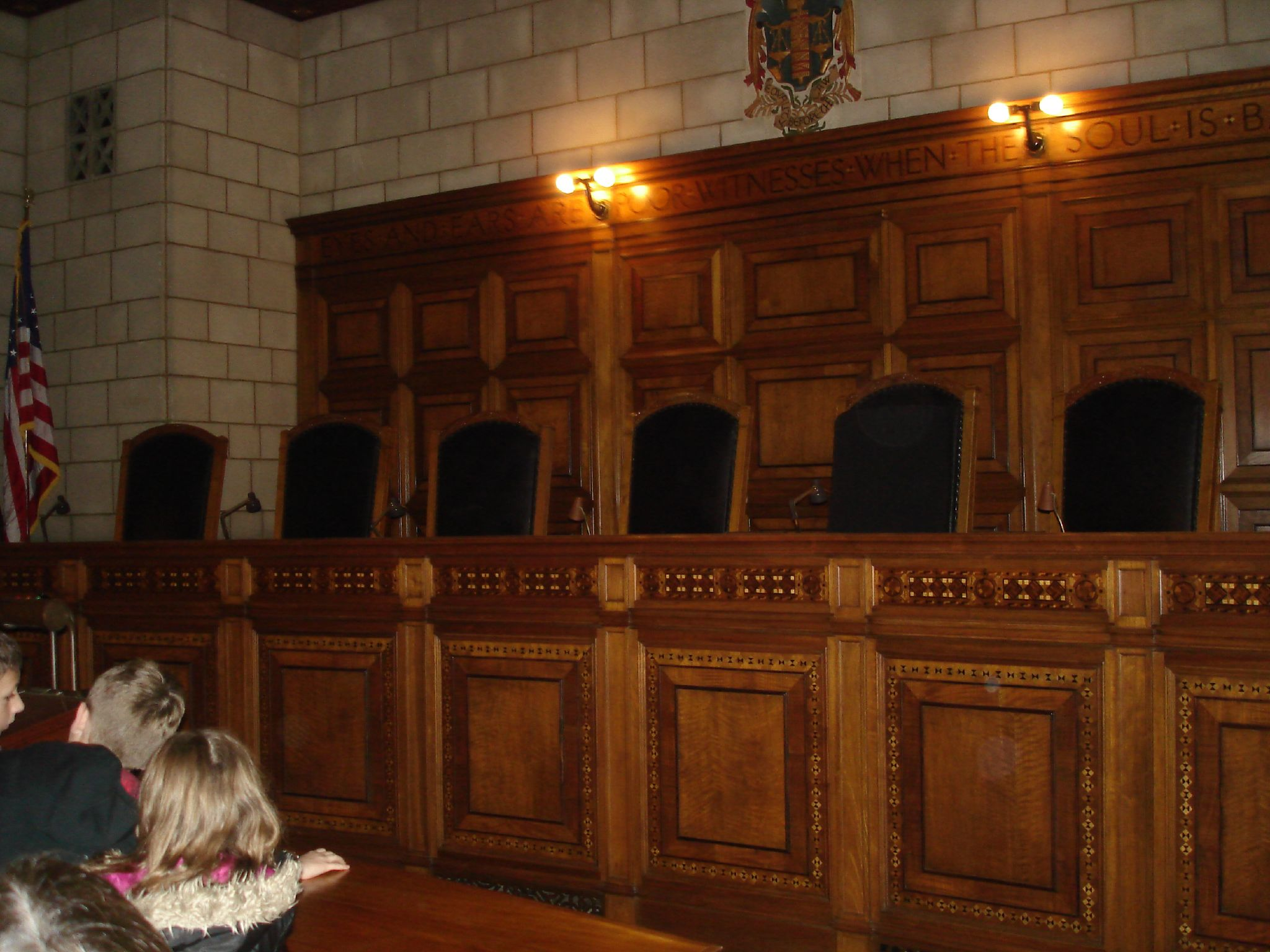
Courtroom

The Nebraska Supreme Court is the highest court in the U.S. state of Nebraska. The court consists of a chief justice and six associate justices. Each justice is initially appointed by the governor of Nebraska; using the Missouri Plan, each justice is then subject to a retention vote for additional six-year terms. The six associate justices each represent a Supreme Court district; the chief justice is appointed (and retained) at-large.

Unlike most other states, apart from North Dakota, the Nebraska Supreme Court requires a supermajority of five justices of the seven to rule unconstitutional a legislative provision (the 48 others states require a simple majority).

== The court's justices ==
=== Selection of justices ===
The court consists of a chief justice and six associate justices. The six justices each represent a Supreme Court district. If a position becomes vacant, the judicial nominating commission, made up of four lawyers and four non-lawyers, holds a hearing to select potential candidates. The commission then submits two names to the Nebraska Governor, who then determines the replacing judge. If the Governor does not follow through with this responsibility within 60 days of receiving the nominees, the responsibility then goes to Chief Justice of the state Supreme Court. To retain the office, a judge must run in a retention election after serving three years. Additionally, the judge must run every six years to retain his seat. If the judge receives less than 50% of the affirmative vote, the judge is not retained. Nebraska judges do not have a mandatory retirement age, but they are granted retirement at age 65 or earlier, if it is due to disability.

=== Meetings of the court ===
The court meets monthly. The Supreme Court is located within the Nebraska State Capitol in Lincoln.

=== Districts ===
The Supreme Court of Nebraska is separated into six districts, with one Justice selected for each. Each justice faces a retention election from his or her district except for the Chief Justice, who faces a statewide retention election. The districts mostly follow county lines and are redrawn decennially after the census results are finalized. The 2021 redistricting produced the following districts:

- District 1 consists of Lancaster County.
- District 2 consists of Sarpy County and Cass County, Nebraska.
- District 3 consists of Antelope, Boone, Boyd, Burt, Cedar, Cuming, Dakota, Dixon, Dodge, Holt, Knox, Madison, Pierce, Stanton, Thurston, Washington, Wayne, and Wheeler counties as well as parts of Douglas and Sarpy counties.
- District 4 consists of Douglas County.
- District 5 consists of Butler, Cass, Clay, Colfax, Fillmore, Gage, Hall, Hamilton, Jefferson, Johnson, Merrick, Nance, Nemaha, Nuckolls, Otoe, Pawnee, Platte, Polk, Richardson, Saline, Saunders, Seward, Thayer, Webster, and York counties.
- District 6 consists of Adams, Arthur, Banner, Blaine, Box Butte, Brown, Buffalo, Chase, Cherry, Cheyenne, Custer, Dawes, Dawson, Deuel, Dundy, Franklin, Frontier, Furnas, Garden, Garfield, Greeley, Gosper, Grant, Harlan, Hayes, Hitchcock, Hooker, Howard, Kearney, Keith, Keya Paha, Kimball, Lincoln, Logan, Loup, McPherson, Morrill, Perkins, Phelps, Red Willow, Rock, Scotts Bluff, Sheridan, Sherman, Sioux, Thomas, and Valley counties.

=== Current justices ===
Current members of Nebraska Supreme Court are:

District	Name	Born	Start	Term ends	Appointer	Law school
Chief Justice	Jeffrey J. Funke	April 15, 1969 (age 57)	June 27, 2016 (Note: Took office as chief justice on November 1, 2024.)	2028	Jim Pillen (R) (Note: Originally appointed as an associate justice by Pete Ricketts (R).)	Nebraska
3	William B. Cassel	September 20, 1955 (age 71)	April 26, 2012	2028	Dave Heineman (R)	Nebraska
1	Stephanie F. Stacy	April 23, 1962 (age 64)	September 28, 2015	2030	Pete Ricketts (R)	Nebraska
4	Jonathan Papik	January 7, 1982 (age 44)	May 7, 2018	2028	Pete Ricketts (R)	Harvard
6	John Freudenberg	November 12, 1969 (age 56)	July 6, 2018	2028	Pete Ricketts (R)	Nebraska
5	Jason Bergevin	1974 (age 51–52)	January 2, 2025	2028	Jim Pillen (R)	WNEU
2	Derek Vaughn		November 10, 2025	2030	Jim Pillen (R)	Nebraska

As of January 2025, the associate justices and chief justice earn $225,055.35 annually.

== History of the court ==
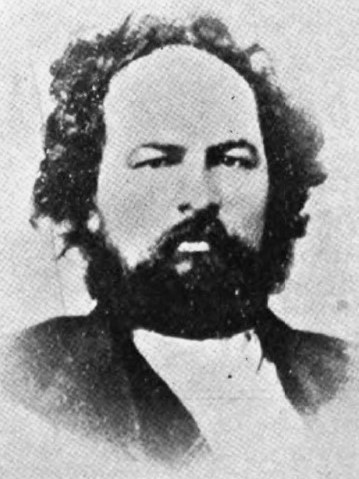
Oliver Perry Mason, first Chief Justice of the Nebraska Supreme Court

=== 1850s to 1970s ===
Nebraska's original Supreme Court, referred to as the Territorial Supreme Court, was established following the Kansas–Nebraska Act in May 1854. Fifteen male judges comprised the bench of the Territorial Supreme Court. During the seventy-one years between 1867, when Nebraska became a state, to 1938 a total of thirty-seven judges sat on the Nebraska Supreme Court. The original total of a bench of fifteen was reduced to three. The three Supreme Court judges also served simultaneously as district court judges at the time of Nebraska's statehood. The Nebraska constitution was then amended in 1908 to include a bench of six associate justices and one chief justice. The chief justice position would be held by the justice with the least amount of time remaining in his term. The judges were originally chosen by partisan election. In 1908 this was later amended to a nonpartisan election. Currently the Nebraska Supreme Court justices are elected by way of a modified Missouri Plan.

In the Nebraska Supreme Court's early years there were no regulations as to what cases could be appealed and heard by the court. Due to the lack of regulations the Supreme Court's docket became overloaded. As a solution the Nebraska Supreme Court was allowed to elect commissioners to assist with the workload. Originally three commissioners were elected, one from the Democratic Party, one from the Republican Party, and the last a member of the Populist Party. The three commissioners would serve a term of three years. In 1901 the commissioners numbers increased from three to a total of nine. Six of the nine commissioners would serve a one-year term and three would serve a two-year term. The commissioners sat in groups of three. This resulted in the creation of four appellate courts, the fourth being the Supreme Court. Select District Court justices were allowed to sit on cases heard by the Supreme Court under four stipulations found in Article V, Section 2 of the state's constitution. If the court was sitting in two separate five judge divisions, if the constitutionality of a statute was in question, an appeal case of a convicted homicide, and lastly when a decision by a division of the Nebraska Supreme Court was under review.) In 1977 a general guideline pertaining to the format of a court report was drafted and released to the court's reporters. This guideline would assure that all reports were structured in the same manner. Even with the efforts to increase the time efficiency of the Supreme Court the docket remained over filled. It was proposed to increase the existing bench of seven judges to a bench of nine. The amendment was opposed but revisited later in 1977. It was in this year that the Supreme Court Judges received a salary of 39,750 dollars, an increase from previous years.

=== Chief Justice Robert G. Simmons ===
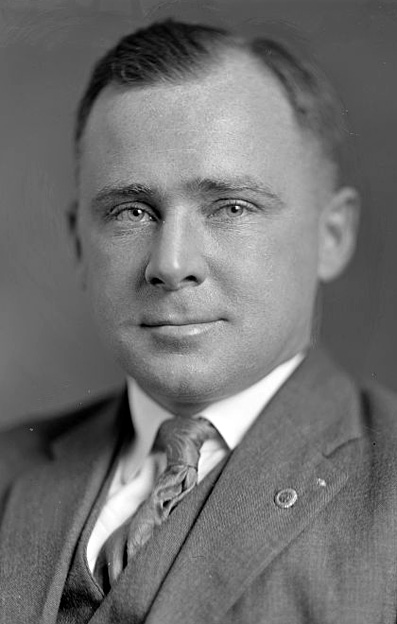
Robert G. Simmons, longest-serving Chief Justice of the Nebraska Supreme Court

Robert G. Simmons was the longest-serving chief justice in the history of the Nebraska Supreme Court as of 2026. Chief Justice Simmons was born in Scotts Bluff County, Nebraska in 1891. He attended Hastings college and the University of Nebraska's College of Law. His early career paths included Scotts Bluff County Attorney, a lieutenant in the army, and was elected to congress as a Republican. On November 8, 1938 Simmons defeated former attorney general C.A. Sorenson and was elected Chief Justice of the Nebraska Supreme Court. The Simmons era heard several cases involving capital punishment. The court issued death warrants for four murders. The four death sentence's method was the electric chair. One of the four executions in the Simmons Era was Charles Starkweather. In 1951 the Simmon's court heard the case of Drabbels v. Skelly Oil Co. This case addressed the legitimacy of a murder charge in regard to an unborn child. The court unanimously ruled that a child who is still within the womb of the mother has no claim to life. Chief Justice Simmons retired on January 2, 1963 after serving on the bench for slightly over twenty five years.

== Structure of the Nebraska courts ==
Decisions of the county court can be appealed to the district court, although some cases, such as probate cases and decisions of the county court sitting as a juvenile court, may be appealed directly to the Nebraska Court of Appeals. Decisions of the district court, juvenile courts, and workers' compensation court are appealable to the Court of Appeals. Decisions of the Court of Appeals are subject to further review by the Supreme Court.

== Notable cases ==
- The case Boyd v. Nebraska ex rel. Thayer was heard by the Supreme Court in 1891. The case was the result of a Gubernatorial Election in which Omaha Democrat James Boyd claimed victory. There were accusations by the Populist party regarding fraudulent votes in the favor of Boyd. John M. Thayer, the existing governor of the state, refused to give up his office. Thayer questioned the legitimacy of Boyd's citizenship claiming he was not eligible for office. Boyd's father, an immigrant, obtained citizenship after his son reached the age of majority. Thayer filed a quo warranto in the Nebraska Supreme Court. The court ruled that the father's citizenship did not apply to Boyd. The Nebraska Supreme Court restored Thayer to office. Boyd appealed after the ruling. The case progressed to the United States Supreme Court. The court ruled that Boyd was a citizen.
- Chicago B. & Q.R. Co. v. Krayenbuhl: Liability
- Gartrell v. Stafford: Breach of a contract
- Meyer v. Nebraska: Due process
- McGuire v. McGuire: Financial responsibilities in a marriage
- Nebraska Press Assn. v. Stuart: Free speech
- Stewart v. Heineman: Same-sex couples' right to become foster or adoptive parents
