= List of court cases involving the American Civil Liberties Union =

The American Civil Liberties Union (ACLU) has been involved in the following legal cases, either by representing a party, or filing an amicus brief, or otherwise significantly involved.

== 1920s ==
1925

- Tennessee v. Scopes (Scopes Trial) - paid for John Scopes' defense
- Gitlow v. New York, 268 U.S. 652 (1925) - represented Benjamin Gitlow

1927

- Whitney v. California, 274 U.S. 357 (1927)

== 1930s ==
1931

- Stromberg v. California, 283 U.S. 359 (1931) - represented Yetta Stromberg

1932

- Powell v. Alabama, 287 U.S. 45 (1932) - represented the Scottsboro Boys

1933

- United States v. One Book Called Ulysses

1935

- Patterson v. Alabama, 294 U.S. 600 (1935)

1937

- De Jonge v. Oregon, 299 U.S. 353 (1937) - represented Dirk De Jonge

1938

- Lovell v. City of Griffin, 303 U.S. 444 (1935)

1939

- Hague v. CIO, 307 U.S. 496 (1939).

1939

- Bolanos v. California - represented Wesley Packard

== 1940s ==
1940

- Cantwell v. Connecticut, 310 U.S. 296 (1940)

1941

- Edwards v. California, 314 U.S. 160 (1941)

1942

- Betts v. Brady, 316 U.S. 455 (1942)

1943

- Hirabayashi v. United States, 320 U.S. 81 (1943) - Amicus curiae for Gordon Kiyoshi Hirabayashi
- West Virginia State Board of Education v. Barnette, 319 U.S. 624 (1943) - Amicus curiae
- Martin v. Struthers

1944

- Korematsu v. United States
- Smith v. Allwright

1946

- Hannegan v. Esquire

1947

- Everson v. Board of Education, 330 U.S. 1 (1947) - Amicus curiae for Arch R. Everson

1948

- Shelley v. Kraemer

== 1950s ==
1951

- Kunz v. New York

1952

- Joseph Burstyn, Inc. v. Wilson
- Rochin v. California

1954

- Brown v. Board of Education, 347 U.S. 483 (1954) - Amicus curiae for Oliver Brown
- Hernandez v. Texas, 347 U.S. 475 (1954) civil rights

1957

- Roth v. United States, 354 U.S. 476 (1957) - Amicus curiae for Samuel Roth
- Watkins v. United States
- Yates v. United States, 354 U.S. 298 (1957) - Amicus curiae for Yates

1958

- Kent v. Dulles
- Speiser v. Randall, 357 U.S. 513 (1958) - ACLU lawyer Lawrence Speiser defended himself
- Trop v. Dulles

1959

- Smith v. California

== 1960s ==
1961

- Mapp v. Ohio, 377 U.S. 643 (1961) - Amicus curiae for Dollree Mapp
- Poe v. Ullman

1962

- Engel v. Vitale, 370 U.S. 421 (1962) - represented Steven I. Engel

1963

- Abington School District v. Schempp, 374 U.S. 203 (1963) - represented Edward Schempp
- Gideon v. Wainwright, 372 U.S. 335 (1963) - Amicus curiae for Clarence Earl Gideon

1964

- Baggett v. Bullitt
- Carroll v. Princess Anne County
- Escobedo v. Illinois, 378 U.S. 478 (1964) - Amicus curiae for Danny Escobedo
- Jacobellis v. Ohio
- New York Times Co. v. Sullivan, 376 U.S. 254 (1964) - Amicus curiae for The New York Times
- Reynolds v. Sims, 377 U.S. 533 (1964) - represented B.A. Reynolds

1965

- Griswold v. Connecticut, 381 U.S. 479 (1965) - Amicus curiae for Estelle T. Griswold
- Lamont v. Postmaster General
- United States v. Seeger, 380 U.S. 163 (1965) - Amicus curiae for Seeger, Jakobson and Peter

1966

- Bond v. Floyd
- Miranda v. Arizona, 384 U.S. 436 (1966) - Amicus curiae for Ernesto Miranda

1967

- Keyishian v. Board of Regents
- Loving v. Virginia
- Whitus v. Georgia

1968

- Epperson v. Arkansas, 393 U.S. 97 (1968) - Amicus curiae for Susan Epperson
- Jones v. Mayer, 392 U.S. 409 (1968) - Amicus curiae for Joseph Lee Jones
- King v. Smith
- Levy v. Louisiana
- Terry v. Ohio, 392 U.S. 1 (1968) - Amicus curiae for John W. Terry
- Washington v. Lee

1969

- Brandenburg v. Ohio, 395 U.S. 444 (1969) - represented Clarence Brandenburg
- Gregory v. Chicago
- Street v. New York
- Tinker v. Des Moines Independent Community School District, 393 U.S. 503 (1969) - represented the Tinker and Eckhardt families
- Watts v. United States

== 1970s ==
1970

- Goldberg v. Kelly

1971

- Cohen v. California, 403 U.S. 15 (1971) - Amicus curiae for Paul Robert Cohen
- New York Times Co. v. United States, 403 U.S. 713 (1971) - Amicus curiae for The New York Times and The Washington Post
- Organization for a Better Austin v. Keefe
- Reed v. Reed, 404 U.S. 71 (1971) - represented Sally Reed
- United States v. Vuitch

1972

- Eisenstadt v. Baird, 405 U.S. 438 (1972) - Amicus curiae for William Baird
- Furman v. Georgia, 408 U.S. 238 (1972) - Amicus curiae for William Furman, Lucious Jackson and Elmer Branch
- Laird v. Tatum, 408 U.S. 1

1973

- Roe v. Wade, 410 U.S. 113 (1973)
- Doe v. Bolton, 410 U.S. 179 (1973) - represented "Mary Doe"
- Frontiero v. Richardson, 411 U.S. 677 (1973) - Amicus curiae for Sharron Frontiero
- Schlesinger v. Holtzman
- Miller v. California, 413 U.S. 15 (1973) - Amicus curiae for Marvin Miller

1974

- Communist Party of Indiana v. Whitcomb
- Smith v. Goguen
- United States v. Nixon, 418 U.S. 683 (1974) - Amicus curiae against Richard Nixon

1975

- O'Connor v. Donaldson
- Taylor v. Louisiana

1976

- Buckley v. Valeo

1977

- Wooley v. Maynard

1978

- In re Primus
- National Socialist Party of America v. Village of Skokie, 432 U.S. 43 (1977) - represented the National Socialist Party of America. Also known as Smith v. Collin

== 1980s ==
1980

- Pruneyard Shopping Center v. Robins

1982

- Island Trees School District v. Pico
- New York v. Ferber, 458 U.S. 747 (1982) - Amicus curiae for Paul Ferber
- McLean v. Arkansas

1983

- Bob Jones University v. United States
- City of Akron v. Akron Center for Reproductive Health, 462 U.S. 416 (1983).

1985

- Wallace v. Jaffree, 472 U.S. 38 (1985) - Amicus curiae for Ishmael Jaffree

1987

- Edwards v. Aguillard, 482 U.S. 578 (1987) - represented Aguillard pro bono

1988

- Nelson v. Streeter - represented artist in Harold Washington portrait controversy

1989

- County of Allegheny v. ACLU, 492 U.S. 573 (1989) - represented itself
- Texas v. Johnson, 491 U.S. 397 (1989) - Amicus curiae for Gregory Lee Johnson
- United States v. Verdugo-Urquidez, 494 U.S. 259 (1990) - Amicus curiae for Rene Martin Verdugo-Urquidez
- Webster v. Reproductive Health Services, 492 U.S. 490 (1989)

== 1990s ==
1990

- Cruzan v. Director of the Missouri Department of Health - represented Nancy Cruzan's family
- Employment Division v. Smith, 494 U.S. 872 (1990) - Amicus curiae for Alfred Smith and Galen Black
- Hodgson v. Minnesota, 497 U.S. 417 (1990).
- United States v. Eichman, 496 U.S. 310 (1990) - Amicus curiae for Shawn Eichman

1991

- Rust v. Sullivan, 500 U.S. 173 (1991).

1992

- Hudson v. McMillian
- Lee v. Weisman, 505 U.S. 577 (1992) - Amicus curiae for Deborah Weisman
- Planned Parenthood v. Casey, 505 U.S. 833 (1992) - represented Planned Parenthood of Southeastern Pennsylvania
- R. A. V. v. City of St. Paul, 505 U.S. 377 (1992) - Amicus curiae for R. A. V.

1993

- J.E.B. v. Alabama ex rel. T.B.
- Wisconsin v. Mitchell

1994

- City of Ladue v. Gilleo

1995

- Capitol Square Review Board v. Pinett
- Church of Lukumi Babalu Aye v. City of Hialeah
- Hurley v. Irish-American Gay, Lesbian, and Bisexual Group of Boston
- McIntyre v. Ohio Elections Commission
- Miller v. Johnson, 515 U.S. 900 (1995).
- Campaign for Fiscal Equity, Inc. v. State of New York, - Amicus curiae

1996

- ACLU v. Zell Miller - represented itself
- Romer v. Evans, 517 U.S. 620 (1996).
- NOW v. Scheidler, - Amicus curiae

1997

- Reno v. ACLU, 521 U.S. 844 (1997).

1999

- ACLU v. Schundler
- Hunt v. Cromartie, 526 U.S. 541 (1999) - Amicus curiae
- Sutton v. United Air Lines, Inc.

== 2000s ==
2000

- Stenberg v. Carhart, 530 U.S. 914 (2000) - Amicus curiae
- Curley v. NAMBLA - represented NAMBLA pro bono
- Boy Scouts of America v. Dale, 530 U.S. 640 (2000) - Amicus curiae
- City of Indianapolis v. Edmond

2002

- ACLU v. Ashcroft (2002)
- Swierkiewicz v. Sorema N. A.

2003

- State v. Dalton
- McConnell v. FEC
- Lawrence v. Texas, 539 U.S. 558 (2003) - Amicus curiae
- Goodridge v. Department of Public Health - Amicus curiae
- Ayotte v. Planned Parenthood of New England - Amicus curiae
- United States v. American Library Association

2004

- ACLU v. Ashcroft (2004)
- ACLU v. Department of Defense - appellant
- Hamdi v. Rumsfeld - Amicus curiae
- Elk Grove Unified School District v. Newdow - Amicus curiae
- Rumsfeld v. Padilla - Amicus curiae
- Rasul v. Bush - Amicus curiae
- Locke v. Davey - Amicus curiae

2005

- Castle Rock v. Gonzales - Amicus curiae for Jessica Gonzales
- Citizens for Equal Protection v. Bruning - Plaintiff alongside Citizens for Equal Protection and Nebraska Advocates for Justice Equality
- City of San Diego and Mt. Soledad Memorial Association v. Paulson - represented Philip Paulson
- McCreary County v. ACLU of Kentucky - ACLU defended itself
- The King’s English v. Shurtleff - represented King's English and others
- Kitzmiller v. Dover Area School District - represented eleven parents
- Varian v. Delfino - Amicus curiae for Michelangelo Delfino and Mary Day
- Gonzales v. Oregon - Amicus curiae for Oregon
- Rumsfeld v. Forum for Academic and Institutional Rights - Amicus curiae for Forum for Academic and Institutional Rights
- MGM v. Grokster - Amicus curiae in support of Grokster

2006

- Qassim v. Bush - Amicus curiae in support of Qassim
- ACLU v. NSA
- Howard v. Arkansas - represented Matthew Lee Howard and other plaintiffs

2007

- Morse v. Frederick - Amicus curiae in support of Frederick
- Gonzales v. Carhart and Gonzales v. Planned Parenthood - Amicus curiae in support of Carhart and Planned Parenthood

2008

- Abdel-Moniem El-Ganayni vs. the United States Department of Energy et al. - represented Dr. El-Ganayni pro-bono

2009

- In re Gill - represented Martin Gill
- Safford Unified School District v. Redding – represented respondent Redding

== 2010s ==
2010

- Perry v. Schwarzenegger - Amicus curiae; private communications between officials in the organization were ordered to be released publicly as court evidence
- Amnesty v. Blair - Amicus curiae
- Davis v. Billington

2013

- Clapper v. Amnesty International
- Missouri v. McNeely
- United States v. Windsor

2015

- Ingersoll v. Arlene's Flowers
- ACLU and others v. NSA
- Obergefell v. Hodges

2017

- Stewart v. Heineman

== 2020s ==
2021

- Mahanoy Area School District v. B.L.

2024

- National Rifle Association of America v. Vullo

== Alphabetical ==
- Abington School District v. Schempp
- Abrams v. United States
- ACLU v. NSA
- ACLU v. Schundler
- Ashcroft v. American Civil Liberties Union
- American Civil Liberties Union v. Ashcroft
- American Civil Liberties Union v. Department of Defense
- Ayotte v. Planned Parenthood of Northern New England
- Baggett v. Bullitt
- Betts v. Brady
- Bob Jones University v. United States
- Bond v. Floyd
- Boy Scouts of America v. Dale
- Brandenburg v. Ohio
- Brown v. Board of Education
- Buckley v. Valeo
- Cantwell v. Connecticut
- Capitol Square Review Board v. Pinett
- Carroll v. Princess Anne County
- Castle Rock v. Gonzales
- Church of Lukumi Babalu Aye v. City of Hialeah
- Citizens for Equal Protection v. Bruning
- City of Akron v. Akron Center for Reproductive Health
- City of Ladue v. Gilleo
- City of Indianapolis v. Edmond
- Cohen v. California
- Communist Party of Indiana v. Whitcomb
- County of Allegheny v. ACLU
- Nancy Cruzan
- Curley v. NAMBLA
- Davis v. Billington
- De Jonge v. Oregon
- Doe v. Bolton
- Edwards v. Aguillard
- Edwards v. California
- Eisenstadt v. Baird
- Abdel-Moniem El-Ganayni
- Elk Grove Unified School District v. Newdow
- Employment Division v. Smith
- Engel v. Vitale
- Epperson v. Arkansas
- Escobedo v. Illinois
- Everson v. Board of Education
- Frontiero v. Richardson
- Furman v. Georgia
- Gideon v. Wainwright
- Gitlow v. New York
- Goldberg v. Kelly
- Gonzales v. Carhart
- Gonzales v. Oregon
- Goodridge v. Department of Public Health
- Gregory v. Chicago
- Griswold v. Connecticut
- Hague v. Committee for Industrial Organization
- Hamdi v. Rumsfeld
- Hannegan v. Esquire
- Hirabayashi v. United States
- Hodgson v. Minnesota
- Howard v. Arkansas
- Hudson v. McMillian
- Hunt v. Cromartie
- Hurley v. Irish-American Gay, Lesbian, and Bisexual Group of Boston
- Ingersoll v. Arlene's Flowers
- In re Gill
- In re Primus
- Island Trees School District v. Pico
- Jacobellis v. Ohio
- J.E.B. v. Alabama ex rel. T.B.
- Jones v. Alfred H. Mayer Co.
- Joseph Burstyn, Inc. v. Wilson
- Kent v. Dulles
- Keyishian v. Board of Regents
- King v. Smith
- Kitzmiller v. Dover Area School District
- Korematsu v. United States
- Kunz v. New York
- Lamont v. Postmaster General
- Lawrence v. Texas
- Lee v. Weisman
- Levy v. Louisiana
- Locke v. Davey
- Lovell v. City of Griffin
- Loving v. Virginia
- Mahanoy Area School District v. B.L.
- Mapp v. Ohio
- Martin v. Struthers
- McConnell v. Federal Election Commission
- McCreary County v. ACLU of Kentucky
- McIntyre v. Ohio Elections Commission
- McLean v. Arkansas
- MGM Studios, Inc. v. Grokster, Ltd.
- Miller v. California
- Miller v. Johnson
- Miranda v. Arizona
- Morse v. Frederick
- Mount Soledad cross controversy
- National Organization for Women, Inc. v. Scheidler
- National Rifle Association of America v. Vullo
- National Socialist Party of America v. Village of Skokie
- New York Times Co. v. Sullivan
- New York Times Co. v. United States
- New York v. Ferber
- O'Connor v. Donaldson
- Organization for a Better Austin v. Keefe
- Patterson v. Alabama
- Perry v. Schwarzenegger
- Planned Parenthood v. Casey
- Poe v. Ullman
- Powell v. Alabama
- Pruneyard Shopping Center v. Robins
- Qassim v. Bush
- R.A.V. v. City of St. Paul
- Rasul v. Bush
- Reed v. Reed
- Reno v. American Civil Liberties Union
- Reynolds v. Sims
- Rochin v. California
- Roe v. Wade
- Romer v. Evans
- Roth v. United States
- Rumsfeld v. Forum for Academic and Institutional Rights, Inc.
- Rumsfeld v. Padilla
- Rust v. Sullivan
- Scopes Trial
- Schlesinger v. Holtzman
- Shelley v. Kraemer
- Smith v. Allwright
- Smith v. Collin
- Smith v. California
- Smith v. Goguen
- Speiser v. Randall
- State v. Dalton
- Stenberg v. Carhart
- Stewart v. Heineman
- Street v. New York
- Stromberg v. California
- Sutton v. United Air Lines, Inc.
- Swierkiewicz v. Sorema N. A.
- Taylor v. Louisiana
- Terry v. Ohio
- Texas v. Johnson
- The King's English v. Shurtleff
- Tinker v. Des Moines Independent Community School District
- Trop v. Dulles
- United States v. Eichman
- United States v. One Book Called Ulysses
- United States v. Nixon
- United States v. Seeger
- United States v. Verdugo-Urquidez
- United States v. Vuitch
- Varian v. Delfino
- Wallace v. Jaffree
- Washington v. Lee
- Watkins v. United States
- Watts v. United States
- Webster v. Reproductive Health Services
- West Virginia State Board of Education v. Barnette
- Whitney v. California
- Whitus v. Georgia
- Wisconsin v. Mitchell
- Wooley v. Maynard
- Yates v. United States
