= Crooker v. California =

- Supreme Court of the United States

Argued April 2, 1958 Decided June 30, 1958
- Full case name: Crooker v. California
- Docket no.: 178
- Citations: 357 U.S. 433 (more) 78 S. Ct. 1287, 2 L. Ed. 2d 1448, 1958 U.S. LEXIS 665
- Argument: Oral argument

Case history
- Prior: conviction; affirmed 47 Cal. 2d 348, 303 P.2d 753 (1956), cert. granted 354 U.S. 908 (1957)

Holding
- A criminal suspect's confession during pre-trial interrogation may be used as evidence, notwithstanding that he was refused the right to an attorney, when the suspect is well-educated, and when it is not proven that the trial was rendered fundamentally unjust and unfair.

Court membership
- Chief Justice Earl Warren Associate Justices Hugo Black · Felix Frankfurter; William O. Douglas · Harold H. Burton; Tom C. Clark · John M. Harlan II; William J. Brennan Jr. · Charles E. Whittaker

Case opinions
- Majority: Clark, joined by Frankfurter, Burton, Harlan, Whittaker
- Dissent: Douglas, joined by Warren, Black, Brennan

Laws applied
- U.S. Const. amends. V, VI
- Overruled by
- Escobedo v. Illinois (in part); Miranda v. Arizona (in full)

Crooker v. California, 357 U.S. 433 (1958), was a decision by the Supreme Court of the United States that limited criminal suspects' constitutional right to counsel before trial, refusing to overturn a subsequent conviction without a showing that the refusal of counsel had a coercive or prejudicial effect. This holding was later overturned by Escobedo v. Illinois and Miranda v. Arizona.

== Background ==
In July 1955, John Russell Crooker was arrested for the murder of Norma McCauley. He was a law student at UCLA, and had been employed at Mrs. McCauley's home as a domestic worker. Crooker and McCauley were both in their early 30s, had both been divorced or separated from their former spouses, and apparently they had developed a romantic relationship. A week before the murder, McCauley had ended the relationship. McCauley was found stabbed and strangled on July 5, and Crooker was arrested later that day.

Crooker was interrogated in his home and at a west Los Angeles police station over the course of fourteen hours. He asked to be able to speak to an attorney repeated during this time, but was consistently refused. Around 2 AM on July 6, Crooker wrote a full confession. When he was asked to orally repeat the confession later in the morning, he refused, and asked again to speak with an attorney. This time, it was allowed, and he was represented by counsel from then on.

== History in lower courts ==
At trial, whether Crooker's confession was voluntary was put to the jury as a question of fact (along with the rest of the murder case), and the jury found that it was voluntary. He was convicted of first degree murder, and was given the death penalty.

=== Appeal to the Supreme Court of California ===
Crooker appealed to the Supreme Court of California on seven different grounds. With the exception of a procedural issue with sentencing (which the Court rejected), and an argument that the jury had been given alcohol with dinner (to which the Court replied that they'd had all night to sleep it off before trial resumed the next day), all of these grounds surrounded the circumstances of his written confession, and the constitutionality of its use as evidence to convict him.

In a 6-1 ruling, the Court affirmed the verdict, rejecting all of Crooker's arguments. The testimony by officers during trial supported Crooker's assertions that he had asked to call an attorney, and had been refused, but the Court stated that it was "without merit" to call that a violation of due process of law. First, the Court said, whether a confession was voluntary was a factual question, taking into consideration the circumstances and any force used or inducements offered. The jury had deemed it voluntary, and the evidence was enough to support their finding, so the Court would not second-guess them. Second, although the due process clause did guarantee a right to counsel, a conviction would not be overturned unless the lack of representation "so fatally infected the regularity of his trial and conviction as to violate the fundamental aspects of fairness and result in a miscarriage of justice." Crooker's conviction hinged on the written conviction, and the jury had found that it was voluntary, therefore there was nothing unjust about the trial.

=== Dissent by Justice Carter ===
Justice Carter quoted in his dissent from the Supreme Court case Glasser v. United States that "The right to have the assistance of counsel is too fundamental and absolute to allow courts to indulge in nice calculations as to the amount of prejudice arising from its denial." He argued for a bright-line rule that suspects in Crooker's situation are entitled to counsel, and that denial of counsel should lead to the inadmissibility of evidence (such as Crooker's confession). Legal scholars have argued that Carter's dissent was a significant precursor to Miranda v. Arizona.

== Decision of the Supreme Court ==
Crooker appealed to the US Supreme Court. This time, the legal discussion was focused only on whether the confession should have been inadmissible as evidence, either because it had been coerced, or because he'd been denied his right to counsel. It was established at the time that a conviction could be overturned for a violation of the right to counsel during trial, but how far the right to counsel extended before trial was not a settled question.

=== Majority opinion ===
In a 5–4 decision, the Supreme Court of the United States affirmed California's ruling. In an opinion written by Justice Clark, the Court first noted that this case was the first time it had faced the question of whether a confession would be inadmissible because a suspect was denied counsel. The majority declined to impose a strict rule saying such a confession was always inadmissible, but said it might be inadmissible in certain conditions. In Crooker's case, it held that his education and maturity made it unlikely that he did not know his rights. The majority opinion focused its reasoning much more on whether the confession was really voluntary, and whether the advice of counsel would have prevented a coerced confession, rather than the right to counsel for its own sake:

To be sure, coercion seems more likely to result from state denial of a specific request for opportunity to engage counsel than it does from state failure to appoint counsel immediately upon arrest. That greater possibility, however, is not decisive. It is negated here by petitioner's age, intelligence, and education. While in law school he had studied criminal law; indeed, when asked to take the lie detector test, he informed the operator that the results of such a test would not be admissible at trial absent a stipulation by the parties. Supplementing that background is the police statement to petitioner well before his confession that he did not have to answer questions. Moreover, the manner of his refusals to answer indicates full awareness of the right to be silent. On this record we are unable to say that petitioner's confession was anything other than voluntary.

— Crooker v. California, 357 US 433 (1958) (Justice Clark, writing for the majority)

Directly addressing whether Crooker had a right to speak to an attorney at the time that he'd asked, the Court said that the concept of due process was "less rigid and more fluid" than the rest of the Bill of Rights. The Court also reiterated the "prejudicial effect" test used by the California Supreme Court, namely that Crooker had to prove that the denial of counsel had "prejudiced" the subsequent trial, rendering it fundamentally unfair and unjust. Lacking such evidence, his conviction would be upheld.

=== Dissent by Douglas ===
Joined by three other justices in dissent, Justice Douglas wrote in favor of overturning Crooker's conviction, much as Justice Carter had done in the California Supreme Court. He argued that adequately protecting the right to counsel required a simpler rule (much like the fruit of the poisonous tree), and he opposed the kind of analysis into circumstances that the majority had done:

The Court speaks of the education of this petitioner and his ability to take care of himself. In an opinion written by Mr. Justice Sutherland the Court said [in Powell v. Alabama], 'Even the intelligent and educated layman has small and sometimes no skill in the science of law . . . He requires the guiding hand of counsel at every step in the proceedings against him.' Mr. Justice Sutherland spoke of the trial itself. But what is true of the trial is true of the preparation for trial and of the period commencing with the arrest of the accused. No matter how well educated, and how well trained in the law an accused may be, he is sorely in need of legal advice once he is arrested for an offense that may exact his life

— Crooker v. California, 357 US 433 (1958) (Justice Douglas, dissenting)

== Subsequent development ==
=== Distinguished by Escobedo ===
The 1964 case Escobedo v. Illinois involved a man who was arrested as a suspect during a murder investigation and was denied an opportunity to speak with a lawyer during the police interrogation. The Supreme Court overturned his conviction, noting distinctions in Illinois criminal law that he was clearly unaware of, and about which a lawyer could have given him advice. The state of Illinois argued that the Crooker decision supported their position, but the Court distinguished the two cases:

Crooker v. California, 357 U. S. 433, does not compel a contrary result. . . Among the critical circumstances which distinguish that case from this one are that the petitioner there, but not here, was explicitly advised by the police of his constitutional right to remain silent and not to "say anything" in response to the questions, id. at 357 U. S. 437, and that petitioner there, but not here, was a well educated man who had studied criminal law while attending law school for a year . . . In any event, to the extent that Cicenia or Crooker may be inconsistent with the principles announced today, they are not to be regarded as controlling.

— Escobedo v. Illinois, 378 U.S. 478 (1964) (Justice Goldberg, writing for the majority)

=== Overturned by Miranda ===
In 1966, the Supreme Court decided Miranda v. Arizona, holding that criminal suspects must be clearly told their constitutional rights, or else their statements during police interrogation would be inadmissible as evidence during their trials. The majority opinion cited Justice's Douglas's Crooker dissent, and stated simply in footnote 48 that "[i]n accordance with our holdings today and in Escobedo v. Illinois, 378 U.S. 478, 492, Crooker v. California, 357 U.S. 433 (1958) and Cicenia v. Lagay, 357 U.S. 504 (1958), are not to be followed."

== Aftermath ==
Crooker's date of execution was set for April 12, 1957 by the trial judge, Stanley Mosk, who would later serve as attorney general of California and as a member of the California Supreme Court. By the time Pat Brown was elected governor of California in 1958 (with Mosk being elected attorney general at the same time), he had not been executed, and Governor Brown commuted his sentence to life without parole. Brown said that a note from Mosk helped make up his mind on Crooker's case. Brown would reduce the sentence further to life with parole in 1966, and Crooker would be released on parole in 1972. Crooker would make a habit of sending Mosk yearly Christmas cards.

== See also ==
- Powell v. Alabama
- Betts v. Brady
- Gideon v. Wainright
