= 1999 United States Court of Appeals for the Third Circuit opinions of Samuel Alito =

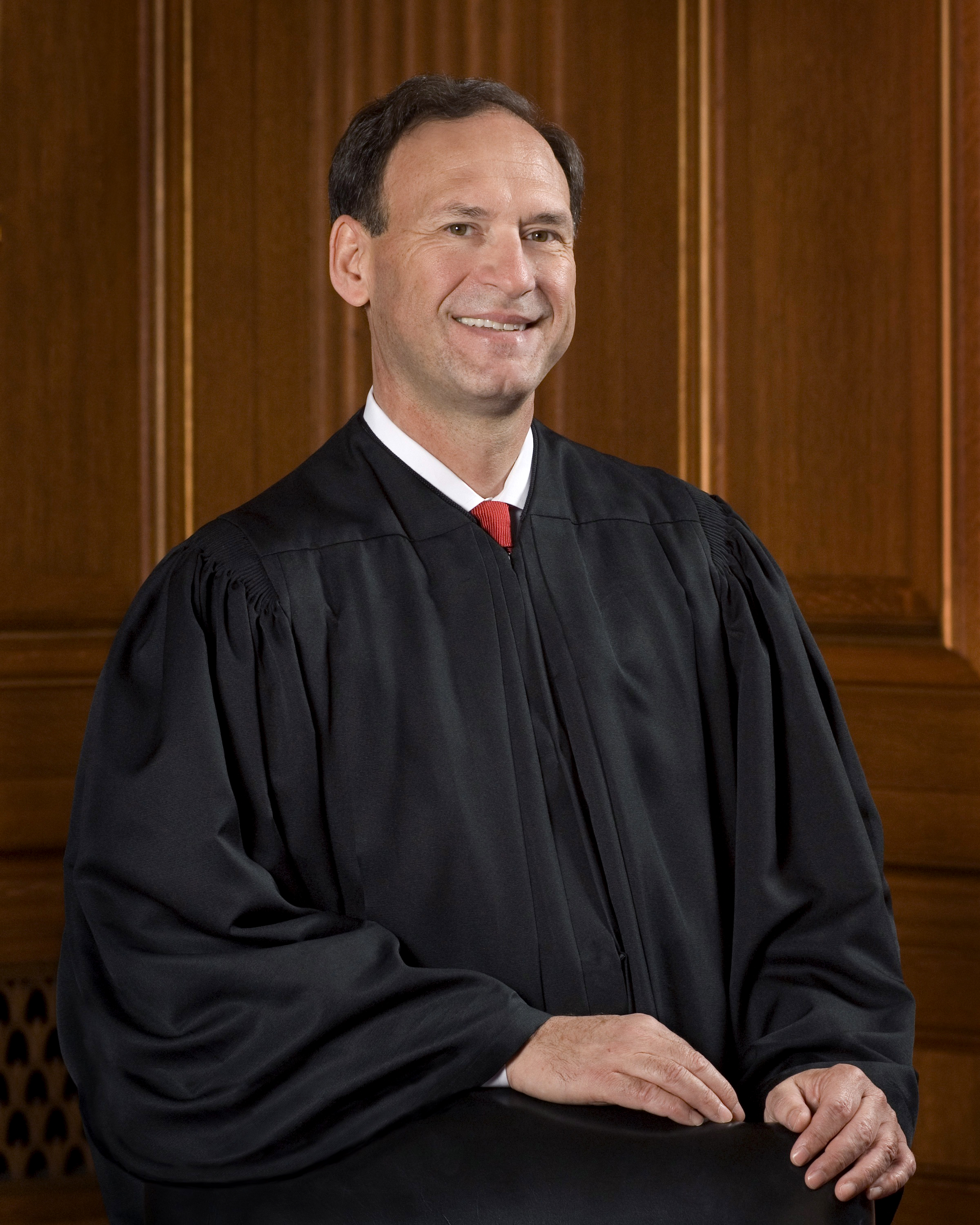
Samuel A. Alito Jr.

Samuel Alito served his 10th year on the United States Court of Appeals for the Third Circuit in 1999. The following is a partial list of opinions written by Judge Alito in 1999.

January 1999

Securacomm Consulting, Inc. v. Securacom Inc., 166 F.3d 182 (3d Cir. January 20, 1999).

February 1999
American Civil Liberties Union v. Schundler, 168 F.3d 92 (3d Cir. February 16, 1999).

March 1999
Police v. City of Newark, 170 F.3d 359 (3d Cir. March 3, 1999).
