= Glomar =

Glomar may refer to:

- Global Marine, a drilling contractor which merged with Santa Fe International Corporation to form GlobalSantaFe Corporation. Now part of Transocean.
- Glomar Challenger, the drillship used for the Deep Sea Drilling Project
- Glomar Explorer, a large salvage vessel built by the CIA
- Glomar response, a "neither confirm nor deny" response by agents of US national security
