= Ashdown v. Utah =

- Supreme Court of the United States

Decided June 30, 1958
- Full case name: Ashdown v. Utah
- Citations: 357 U.S. 426 (more)

Holding
- The officers did not take advantage of petitioner or overtake her will when eliciting the confession. Judgment affirmed.

Court membership
- Chief Justice Earl Warren Associate Justices Hugo Black · Felix Frankfurter; William O. Douglas · Harold H. Burton; Tom C. Clark · John M. Harlan II; William J. Brennan Jr. · Charles E. Whittaker

Case opinions
- Majority: Burton
- Dissent: Douglas, joined by Black

Ashdown v. Utah, 357 U.S. 426 (1958), was a United States Supreme Court case in which the Court held that the officers involved in the case did not take advantage of petitioner or overtake her will when eliciting the confession. This case was one of the last decisions by the Court about confession evidence that preceded important new rules in Escobedo v. Illinois.

== Background ==
The husband of the petitioner in this case died suddenly of strychnine poisoning. After the husband's funeral, the police brought the petitioner in for four-and-a-half hours of questioning by deputies and the prosecutor under the pretense that it was an investigation into whether the poisoning was an accident. The prosecutor advised the petitioner that she did not need to talk to them and that she could get a lawyer. Towards the end of the interview, the petitioner confessed to putting strychnine in a drink intended for herself before giving it to her husband instead.

During the interview, the petitioner's uncle and father arrived at the sheriff's office and asked to see the petitioner because they did not believe it was fair for her to be summoned without a lawyer. They were denied admission. Moreover, the police lied to them and said the petitioner was being questioned with a lawyer present. Justices Douglas and Black ultimately dissented in this case because they believed a request from a next-of-kin should have been sufficient to trigger the petitioner's request for a lawyer and the evidentiary privileges attendant to that request.
