= List of United States Supreme Court cases, volume 414 =

This is a list of all the United States Supreme Court cases from volume 414 of the United States Reports:

Case name	Citation	Date decided
Satiacum v. Washington	414 U.S. 1	1973
Plummer v. City of Columbus	414 U.S. 2	1973
INS v. Hibi	414 U.S. 5	1973
Dennett v. Hogan	414 U.S. 12	1973
Norwell v. City of Cincinnati	414 U.S. 14	1973
Taylor v. United States (1973)	414 U.S. 17	1973
Wainwright v. Stone	414 U.S. 21	1973
Moore v. Arizona	414 U.S. 25	1973
Berry v. City of Cincinnati	414 U.S. 29	1973
Musser v. United States	414 U.S. 31	1973
Dept. of Game v. Puyallup Tribe	414 U.S. 44	1973
Kusper v. Pontikes	414 U.S. 51	1973
Lefkowitz v. Turley	414 U.S. 70	1973
Espinoza v. Farah Mfg. Co.	414 U.S. 86	1973
Paschall v. Christie-Stewart, Inc.	414 U.S. 100	1973
Hess v. Indiana	414 U.S. 105	1973
Chi. Mercantile Exch. v. Deaktor	414 U.S. 113	1973
Merrill Lynch, Pierce, Fenner & Smith, Inc. v. Ware	414 U.S. 117	1973
Cupp v. Naughten	414 U.S. 141	1973
N.D. Bd. of Pharmacy v. Snyder's Drug Stores, Inc.	414 U.S. 156	1973
Golden State Bottling Co. v. NLRB	414 U.S. 168	1973
Falk v. Brennan	414 U.S. 190	1973
Foley v. Blair & Co.	414 U.S. 212	1973
United States v. Robinson	414 U.S. 218	1973
Gustafson v. Florida	414 U.S. 260	1973
NLRB v. Savair Mfg. Co.	414 U.S. 270	1973
Zahn v. Int'l Paper Co.	414 U.S. 291	1973
Bonelli Cattle Co. v. Arizona	414 U.S. 313	1973
United States v. Calandra	414 U.S. 338	1974
Gateway Coal Co. v. Mine Workers	414 U.S. 368	1974
United States v. Maze	414 U.S. 395	1974
Marshall v. United States	414 U.S. 417	1974
Communist Party of Indiana v. Whitcomb	414 U.S. 441	1974
Nat'l R.R. Passenger Corp. v. Nat'l Ass'n of R.R. Passengers	414 U.S. 453	1974
Schmidt v. Lessard	414 U.S. 473	1974
Vachon v. New Hampshire	414 U.S. 478	1974
O'Shea v. Littleton	414 U.S. 488	1974
Spomer v. Littleton	414 U.S. 514	1974
O'Brien v. Skinner	414 U.S. 524	1974
Am. Pipe & Constr. Co. v. Utah	414 U.S. 538	1974
Lau v. Nichols	414 U.S. 563	1974
Sea-Land Services, Inc. v. Gaudet	414 U.S. 573	1974
Christian v. N.Y. State Dept. of Labor	414 U.S. 614	1974
Cleveland Board of Education v. LaFleur	414 U.S. 632	1974
Oneida Indian Nation v. Oneida Cnty.	414 U.S. 661	1974
Snider v. All State Adm's, Inc.	414 U.S. 685	1974
Edelman v. Jordan	414 U.S. 1301	1973
Holtzman v. Schlesinger I	414 U.S. 1304	1973
Holtzman v. Schlesinger II	414 U.S. 1316	1973
Schlesinger v. Holtzman	414 U.S. 1321	1973
Ex parte Hayes	414 U.S. 1327	1973
