= No comment =

Phrase describing refusal of commentary

"No comment" is a phrase used as a response to journalistic inquiries which the respondent does not wish to answer. Public figures, such as celebrities and politicians, may decline to comment on issues they are questioned about, or may have nothing to say about the issue at the time of being asked for input.

"No comment" indicates that the speaker does not choose to say anything on the subject. It is not a request for the material to be considered off the record or otherwise kept confidential. If the speaker wishes to talk about the subject, but does not wish to be named as a source, they must obtain the journalist's explicit agreement in advance that the response is not to be used for attribution.

In many English-speaking countries such as the UK and the U.S., this phrase is also a stock phrase, especially in popular culture, where a suspect or person being interviewed in a criminal investigation wishes to exercise their right to silence.

== Etymology ==
The first recorded usage as a stock answer to questions was made in 1950 by Charles Ross, President Harry Truman's White House press secretary. According to William Safire, Winston Churchill attributed the phrase to American diplomat Sumner Welles.

== Criticism ==
Some public relations professionals have argued against the use of "no comment", stating that one of the goals of working with the press is to resolve issues before they become hot topics. Offering no comment allows the press to fill in the blanks, diverts the focus of the publicity, and sacrifices an opportunity to communicate key messages.

== See also ==
- Glomar response
- Mokusatsu
