= Societe Internationale Pour Participations Industrielles et Commerciales, S.A. v. Rogers =

Societe Internationale Pour Participations Industrielles Et Commerciales, S.A. v. Rogers
- Supreme Court of the United States

Argued May 1, 1958 Decided June 16, 1958
- Full case name: Societe Internationale Pour Participations Industrielles Et Commerciales, S.A. v. Rogers, Attorney General, Successor to the Alien Property Custodian, et al.
- Citations: 357 U.S. 197 (more) 78 S. Ct. 1087; 2 L. Ed. 2d 1255; 1958 U.S. LEXIS 819

Court membership
- Chief Justice Earl Warren Associate Justices Hugo Black · Felix Frankfurter; William O. Douglas · Harold H. Burton; Tom C. Clark · John M. Harlan II; William J. Brennan Jr. · Charles E. Whittaker

Case opinion
- Majority: Harlan
- Clark took no part in the consideration or decision of the case.

Societe Internationale Pour Participations Industrielles Et Commerciales, S.A. v. Rogers, 357 U.S. 197 (1958), was a case decided by the United States Supreme Court, in which the court considered whether a district court could dismiss a case based on the petitioner's failure to comply with the court's order to produce records of the petitioner's Swiss bank account, an act which would have amounted to a violation of Swiss law.
