= Wikimedia Foundation v. NSA =

Lawsuit against the U.S. National Security Agency

- Court: United States District Court for the District of Maryland
- Full case name: Wikimedia Foundation, et al. v. National Security Agency, et al.
- Defendants: National Security Agency / Central Security Service, United States Department of Justice, Adm. Michael S. Rogers in his official capacity as Director of the National Security Agency and Chief of the Central Security Service, Office of the Director of National Intelligence, Daniel R. Coats in his official capacity as Director of National Intelligence, and Jefferson B. Sessions III in his official capacity as Attorney General of the United States
- Counsel for plaintiffs: American Civil Liberties Union, Cooley LLP
- Plaintiffs: Wikimedia Foundation, National Association of Criminal Defense Lawyers, Human Rights Watch, Amnesty International USA, PEN American Center, Global Fund for Women, The Nation, Rutherford Institute, Washington Office on Latin America
- Citation: No. 15-2560

Case history
- Prior actions: Dismissal of all plaintiffs' complaints by the US District Court for the District of Maryland. Dismissal appealed by the Wikimedia Foundation; Affirmation of dismissal of 8 of the 9 plaintiffs' complaints (Wikimedia excluded) by US Court of Appeals for the Fourth Circuit; Dismissal of Wikimedia Foundation's allegations concurrently vacated and remanded
- Subsequent actions: Dismissal of the Wikimedia Foundation's allegations Certiorari denied

Court membership
- Judge sitting: T. S. Ellis III

Wikimedia Foundation, et al. v. National Security Agency, et al. was a lawsuit filed by the American Civil Liberties Union (ACLU) on behalf of the Wikimedia Foundation and several other organizations against the National Security Agency (NSA), the United States Department of Justice (DOJ), and other named individuals, alleging mass surveillance of Wikipedia users carried out by the NSA. The suit claims the surveillance system, which NSA calls "Upstream", breaches the First Amendment to the United States Constitution, which protects freedom of speech, and the Fourth Amendment to the United States Constitution, which prohibits unreasonable searches and seizures.

The suit was filed in the United States District Court for the District of Maryland as the NSA is based in Fort Meade, Maryland. The suit was dismissed in October 2015 by Judge T. S. Ellis III; this decision was appealed four months later to the Fourth Circuit Court of Appeals by the Wikimedia Foundation. The Court of Appeals found that the dismissal was valid for all of the plaintiffs except the Foundation, whose allegations the court found "plausible" enough to have legal standing for the case to be remanded to the lower court. In further rulings, the District Court, Court of Appeals, and U.S. Supreme Court (in declining to hear the case and invoking the state secrets privilege), ruled for the NSA, ending the litigation.

== Plaintiffs ==
The original plaintiffs besides the Wikimedia Foundation were the National Association of Criminal Defense Lawyers, Human Rights Watch, Amnesty International USA, the PEN American Center, the Global Fund for Women, The Nation magazine, the Rutherford Institute, and the Washington Office on Latin America.

== Background ==
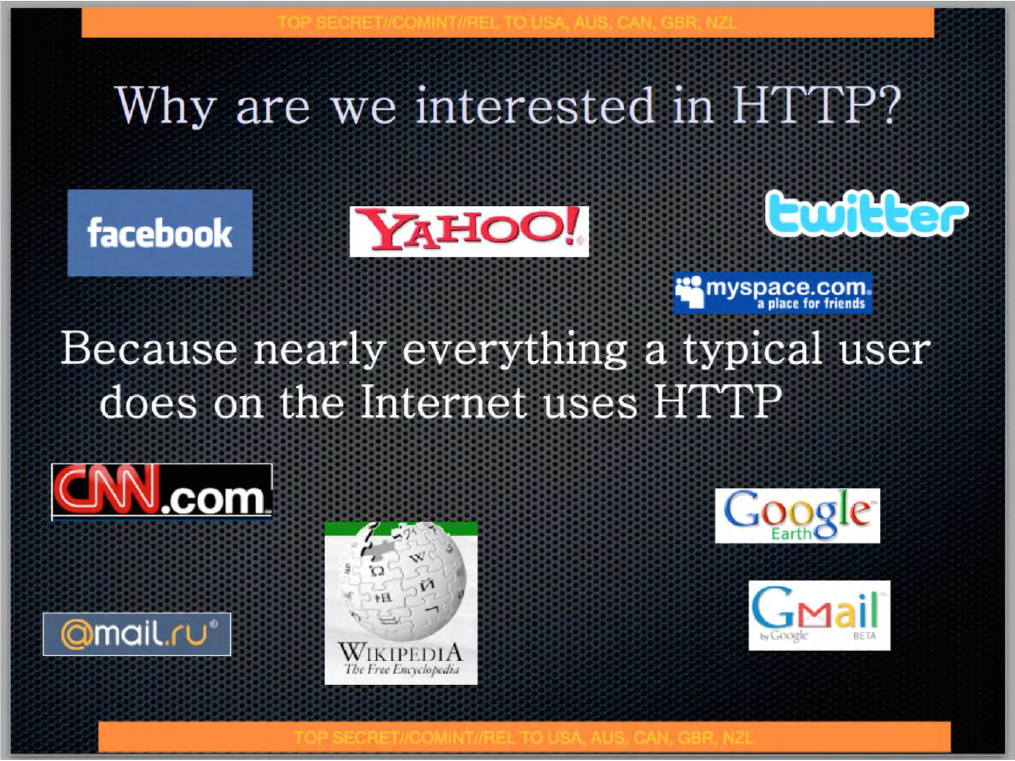
NSA slide referring to Wikipedia as a surveillance target

Upstream surveillance was first revealed in May 2013 by Edward Snowden, a former NSA analyst. A previous challenge by the ACLU, Clapper v. Amnesty International USA, failed for lack of standing. In the light of some of the leaks by Snowden, which included an above Top Secret NSA slide that specifically referred to Wikipedia as a target for HTTP surveillance, the Wikimedia Foundation pushed forward with a legal complaint against the NSA for violating its users' First and Fourth Amendment rights.

Since Clapper, the government itself has confirmed many of the key facts about NSA's Upstream surveillance, including that it conducts suspicionless searches. ACLU attorney Patrick Toomey noted the lawsuit is particularly relevant as the plaintiffs engage in "hundreds of billions of international communications" annually. Any program of Upstream surveillance must necessarily sweep up a substantial part of these communications.

== Litigation ==
On August 6, 2015, the defendants (National Security Agency, et al.) brought a motion to dismiss, arguing that the plaintiffs have not plausibly shown that they have been injured by Upstream collection of data and thus lack standing to sue. In response, the Electronic Frontier Foundation filed an amicus brief on behalf of a group of libraries and booksellers. Both sides presented oral arguments at a hearing on September 25, 2015.

On October 23, 2015, the District Court for the District of Maryland dismissed the suit on grounds of standing. US District Judge T. S. Ellis III ruled that the plaintiffs could not plausibly prove they were subject to Upstream surveillance, echoing the 2013 decision in Clapper v. Amnesty International US. The Wikimedia Foundation said it expected to appeal the decision. The Foundation said its complaint had merit, and that there was no question that Upstream surveillance captured the communications of both its user community and the Wikimedia Foundation itself. The Electronic Frontier Foundation, who had filed an amicus brief in support of the plaintiffs, said it was perverse to dismiss a suit for lack of proof (standing) when the surveillance program complained of was secret, and urged federal courts to tackle the serious constitutional issues that Upstream surveillance presents. The plaintiffs filed an appeal with the United States Court of Appeals for the Fourth Circuit on February 17, 2016.

On May 23, 2017, the Fourth Circuit Court of Appeals vacated the dismissal by the lower court of Wikimedia's complaints. The Court of Appeals ruled that the Foundation's allegations of the NSA's Fourth Amendment violations were plausible enough to "survive a facial challenge to standing", finding that the potential harm done by the NSA's collection of private data was not speculative. The court thereby remanded the suit by the Foundation and ordered the District Court of Maryland to continue the proceedings. The court inversely affirmed the dismissal by Ellis of the suits by the other plaintiffs; in its finding the court noted that the non-Wikimedia plaintiffs had not made a strong enough case that their operations were affected by Upstream's scope.

On December 16, 2019, the District Court held that the Wikimedia Foundation did not have standing to proceed with its claims. On February 14, 2020, the Wikimedia Foundation filed a notice of appeal in this case before the Court of Appeals for the Fourth Circuit. The appeal was heard in March 2021 and once again dismissed in September of the same year.

In February 2023, the U.S. Supreme Court declined to hear the case.

== See also ==
- Jewel v. NSA
