= Hanson v. Denckla =

- Supreme Court of the United States

Argued March 10, 1958 Decided June 23, 1958
- Full case name: Elizabeth Donner Hanson v. Katherine N.R. Denckla
- Citations: 357 U.S. 235 (more) 78 S. Ct. 1228; 2 L. Ed. 2d 1283

Holding
- The unilateral activity of a single person who has some relation to a nonresident defendant does not fulfill the minimum contacts test to establish personal jurisdiction

Court membership
- Chief Justice Earl Warren Associate Justices Hugo Black · Felix Frankfurter; William O. Douglas · Harold H. Burton; Tom C. Clark · John M. Harlan II; William J. Brennan Jr. · Charles E. Whittaker

Case opinions
- Majority: Warren, joined by Harlan, Frankfurter, Clark, Whittaker
- Dissent: Douglas
- Dissent: Black, joined by Burton, Brennan

Laws applied
- U.S. Const. amend. XIV

Hanson v. Denckla, 357 U.S. 235 (1958), was a case decided by the Supreme Court of the United States regarding personal jurisdiction in the context of assets held in trust.

== Factual background ==
A family trust was created by Mrs. Donner, who lived in Pennsylvania. The trust was incorporated in Delaware, and a Delaware bank was the trustee. Donner later changed her state of domicile upon moving to Florida where she eventually died. The will was admitted to probate in Florida, and the court addressed the question of whether the Florida court or the Delaware trustee had jurisdiction over the trust.

== Decision ==
The Court decided that the Florida court lacked jurisdiction based on the minimum contacts test that had developed over the course of several decades of Supreme Court Jurisprudence. The trust company had no substantial business with Florida and no offices in Florida. The only contact with Florida was that Donner moved there, which was ruled insufficient to support jurisdiction.

== See also ==
- List of United States Supreme Court cases, volume 357
- List of United States Supreme Court cases
