= Espinoza v. Farah Manufacturing Co. =

Espinoza v. Farah Mfg. Co.
- Supreme Court of the United States

Argued October 10–11, 1973 Decided November 19, 1973
- Full case name: Espinoza, et vir v. Farah Manufacturing Company
- Citations: 414 U.S. 86 (more) 94 S. Ct. 334; 38 L. Ed. 2d 287

Holding
- An employer's refusal to hire a person because he is not a United States citizen does not constitute employment discrimination on the basis of "national origin" in violation of §703 of the Civil Rights Act of 1964.

Court membership
- Chief Justice Warren E. Burger Associate Justices William O. Douglas · William J. Brennan Jr. Potter Stewart · Byron White; Thurgood Marshall · Harry Blackmun; Lewis F. Powell Jr. · William Rehnquist

Case opinions
- Majority: Marshall, joined by Burger, Brennan, Stewart, White, Blackmun, Powell, Rehnquist
- Dissent: Douglas

Espinoza v. Farah Mfg. Co., 414 U.S. 86 (1973), was a decision by the United States Supreme Court, which held that an employer's refusal to hire a person because he is not a United States citizen does not constitute employment discrimination on the basis of "national origin" in violation of §703 of the Civil Rights Act of 1964.

Espinoza, a Mexican national admitted to residence in the United States and married to a U.S. national, brought suit after exhausting her administrative remedies with the Equal Employment Opportunity Commission, alleging that Farah Mfg. Company's refusal to hire her in its San Antonio, Texas division because of her Mexican citizenship violated §703 of the Civil Rights Act, which makes it an unlawful employment practice for an employer to fail or refuse to hire any individual because of his race, color, religion, sex, or national origin.

The District Court granted Espinoza's motion for summary judgment, relying primarily on an EEOC guideline providing that a lawful alien resident may not be discriminated against on the basis of citizenship. The United States Court of Appeals for the Fifth Circuit reversed, and the Supreme Court affirmed this decision.

== See also ==
- List of United States Supreme Court cases, volume 414
