= Organization for a Better Austin v. Keefe =

- Supreme Court of the United States

Argued January 20, 1971 Decided May 17, 1971
- Full case name: Organization for a Better Austin, et al. v. Keefe
- Citations: 402 U.S. 415 (more) 91 S. Ct. 1575; 29 L. Ed. 2d 1; 1971 U.S. LEXIS 44; 1 Media L. Rep. 1021

Case history
- Prior: Certiorari to the Appellate Court of Illinois, First District

Holding
- Courts cannot prohibit peaceful distribution of pamphlets, unless a heavy burden is met to justify prior restraint.

Court membership
- Chief Justice Warren E. Burger Associate Justices Hugo Black · William O. Douglas; John M. Harlan II · William J. Brennan Jr. Potter Stewart · Byron White; Thurgood Marshall · Harry Blackmun

Case opinions
- Majority: Burger, joined by Black, Douglas, Brennan, Stewart, White, Marshall, Blackmun
- Dissent: Harlan

Laws applied
- U.S. Const. amends. I, XIV

Organization for a Better Austin v. Keefe, 402 U.S. 415 (1971), was a United States Supreme Court case in which the Court held that courts cannot prohibit peaceful distribution of pamphlets, unless a heavy burden is met to justify prior restraint.

== Background ==
Keefe, a real estate broker, worked in the Chicago neighborhood of Austin. Keefe soon garnered a reputation for his business practices, which were considered to be inflammatory and controversial. Among the asserted practices was that Keefe attempted to generate sales by panicking white homeowners into selling at below-market prices by suggesting that African Americans would soon be living nearby, then selling the houses to African Americans at market value or higher (a practice known as blockbusting).

Some residents of Austin, including the Organization for a Better Austin (OBA), attempted to coerce Keefe to change his tactics by distributing flyers in the town of Westchester, where Keefe resided. Keefe sued, and obtained an injunction preventing the OBA from distributing flyers in Keefe's neighborhood. The OBA argued that their pamphlets were merely informational, but Keefe argued that they were invasions of privacy, and were intimidating.

The Illinois Appellate Court upheld the injunction (115 Ill.App.2d 236, 253 N.E.2d 76).

== Opinion of the Court ==
The Supreme Court, in an 8 to 1 decision, overturned the injunction. The court ruled that peaceful distribution of pamphlets is an important aspect of the First Amendment freedom of speech, and that prior restraint of such peaceful speech requires a very compelling reason.

Justice Harlan dissented solely on the basis that the injunction did not constitute a "final decision" from which an appeal could be taken, and that the Court thus lacked jurisdiction.

== See also ==
- Carroll v. Princess Anne, 393 U.S. 175 (1968)
- Bantam Books, Inc. v. Sullivan, 372 U.S. 58 (1963)
