= Gateway Coal Co. v. Mine Workers =

- Supreme Court of the United States

Decided January 8, 1974
- Full case name: Gateway Coal Co. v. Mine Workers
- Citations: 414 U.S. 368 (more)

Holding
- A union seeking to justify a contractually prohibited work stoppage under Section 502 of the LMRA must present ascertainable, objective evidence supporting its conclusion that an abnormally dangerous condition for work exists.

Court membership
- Chief Justice Warren E. Burger Associate Justices William O. Douglas · William J. Brennan Jr. Potter Stewart · Byron White; Thurgood Marshall · Harry Blackmun; Lewis F. Powell Jr. · William Rehnquist

Case opinions
- Majority: Powell
- Dissent: Douglas

Laws applied
- Labor Management Relations Act

Gateway Coal Co. v. Mine Workers, 414 U.S. 368 (1974), was a United States Supreme Court case in which the court held that a union seeking to justify a contractually prohibited work stoppage under Section 502 of the Labor Management Relations Act must present ascertainable, objective evidence supporting its conclusion that an abnormally dangerous condition for work exists.
