= Zahn v. International Paper Co. =

- Supreme Court of the United States

Decided December 17, 1973
- Full case name: Zahn v. International Paper Co.
- Citations: 414 U.S. 291 (more)

Case history
- Prior: 53 F.R.D. 430 (Vt.1971); 469 F.2d 1033 (CA2 1972); 410 U.S. 925 (1973)

Holding
- Each member of a class action must satisfy the amount-in-controversy requirement to remain attached to a lawsuit based on diversity jurisdiction.

Court membership
- Chief Justice Warren E. Burger Associate Justices William O. Douglas · William J. Brennan Jr. Potter Stewart · Byron White; Thurgood Marshall · Harry Blackmun; Lewis F. Powell Jr. · William Rehnquist

Case opinions
- Majority: White
- Dissent: Brennan, joined by Douglas, Marshall

Zahn v. International Paper Co., 414 U.S. 291 (1973), was a United States Supreme Court case in which the court held that each member of a class action must satisfy the amount-in-controversy requirement to remain attached to a lawsuit based on diversity jurisdiction.

== Background ==
Plaintiffs including Zahn, asserting that they were owners of property fronting on Lake Champlain in Orwell, Vermont, sued in the federal District Court on behalf of a class consisting of themselves and 200 lakefront property owners and lessees. They sought damages from International Paper Company, a New York corporation, for allegedly having permitted discharges from its pulp and paper-making plant, located in New York, to flow into Ticonderoga Creek and to be carried by that stream into Lake Champlain, thereby polluting the waters of the lake and damaging the value and utility of the surrounding properties. The suit was brought as a diversity action, jurisdiction assertedly resting on 28 U.S.C. § 1332(a)(1). The claim of each of the named plaintiffs was found to satisfy the $10,000 jurisdictional amount, but the District Court was convinced "to a legal certainty" that not every individual owner in the class had suffered pollution damages in excess of $10,000. Reading Snyder v. Harris, 394 U. S. 332 (1969), as precluding maintenance of the action by any member of the class whose separate and distinct claim did not individually satisfy the jurisdictional amount, and concluding that it would not be feasible to define a class of property owners each of whom had more than a $10,000 claim, the District Court then refused to permit the suit to proceed as a class action. A divided Second Circuit Court of Appeals affirmed, principally on the authority of Snyder v. Harris. The Supreme Court granted the petition for writ of certiorari.

== Opinion of the court ==
The Supreme Court issued an opinion on December 17, 1973.

== Later developments ==
The Supreme Court established exceptions to Zahn involving supplemental jurisdiction in 2005 with Exxon Mobil Corp. v. Allapattah Services, Inc..
