= Hudson v. McMillian =

- Supreme Court of the United States

Argued November 13, 1991 Decided February 25, 1992
- Full case name: Hudson v. McMillian
- Citations: 503 U.S. 1 (more) 112 S. Ct. 995; 117 L. Ed. 2d 156; 1992 U.S. LEXIS 1372

Case history
- Prior: 929 F.2d 1014 (5th Cir. 1990), reversed.

Holding
- The use of excessive physical force against a prisoner may constitute cruel and unusual punishment even though the inmate does not suffer serious injury.

Court membership
- Chief Justice William Rehnquist Associate Justices Byron White · Harry Blackmun; John P. Stevens · Sandra Day O'Connor; Antonin Scalia · Anthony Kennedy; David Souter · Clarence Thomas

Case opinions
- Majority: O'Connor, joined by Rehnquist, White, Kennedy, Souter; Stevens (Parts I, II-A, II-B, II-C)
- Concurrence: Stevens (in part and in judgment)
- Concurrence: Blackmun (in the judgment)
- Dissent: Thomas, joined by Scalia

Laws applied
- U.S. Const. amend. VIII

Hudson v. McMillian, 503 U.S. 1 (1992), is a United States Supreme Court decision where the Court on a 7–2 vote held that the use of excessive physical force against a prisoner may constitute cruel and unusual punishment even though the inmate does not suffer serious injury.

== Opinion of the Court ==
Justice Sandra Day O'Connor delivered the opinion of the Court, joined by Chief Justice Rehnquist and Justices White, Kennedy, and Souter. Justices Blackmun and Stevens separately concurred in the judgment. In the case, petitioner Hudson, a Louisiana prison inmate, testified that he suffered minor bruises, facial swelling, loosened teeth, and a cracked dental plate as a result from a beating by respondent prison guards, McMillian and Woods, while he was handcuffed and shackled following an argument with McMillian, and that respondent Mezo, a supervisor on duty, allegedly watched the beating and told the officers "not to have too much fun." Hudson's injuries were "minor" and required no medical attention.

=== Dissent ===
Justices Scalia and Thomas dissented, with Justice Thomas writing that the beating did not cause sufficient harm to meet the constitutional standard; however, he left open the option of a criminal charge or a tort claim, stating:

In my view, a use of force that causes only insignificant harm to a prisoner may be immoral, it may be tortious, it may be criminal, and it may even be remediable under other provisions of the Federal Constitution, but it is not "cruel and unusual punishment." In concluding to the contrary, the Court today goes far beyond our precedents.

Conceding some of the petitioners' arguments, Justice Thomas cited a classic line from a Seventh Circuit decision, Williams v. Boles by Frank Easterbrook:

Many things—beating with a rubber truncheon, water torture, electric shock, incessant noise, reruns of Space: 1999—may cause agony as they occur, yet leave no enduring injury. The state is not free to inflict such pains without cause just so long as it is careful to leave no marks.

According to historian David Garrow, Thomas's dissent in Hudson was a "classic call for federal judicial restraint, reminiscent of views that were held by Felix Frankfurter and John M. Harlan II a generation earlier, but editorial criticism rained down on him." Thomas would later respond to the accusation "that I supported the beating of prisoners in that case. Well, one must either be illiterate or fraught with malice to reach that conclusion ... no honest reading can reach such a conclusion."
