= Smith v. Goguen =

- Supreme Court of the United States

Argued November 12–13, 1973 Decided March 25, 1974
- Full case name: Smith v. Goguen
- Citations: 415 U.S. 566 (more) 94 S. Ct. 1242; 39 L. Ed. 2d 605; 1974 U.S. LEXIS 113

Case history
- Prior: Appeal from the United States Court of Appeals for the First Circuit

Holding
- Flag desecration laws that prohibit "contemptuous" treatment of the flag are overly broad.

Court membership
- Chief Justice Warren E. Burger Associate Justices William O. Douglas · William J. Brennan Jr. Potter Stewart · Byron White; Thurgood Marshall · Harry Blackmun; Lewis F. Powell Jr. · William Rehnquist

Case opinions
- Majority: Powell, joined by Douglas, Brennan, Stewart, Marshall
- Concurrence: White
- Dissent: Blackmun, joined by Burger
- Dissent: Rehnquist, joined by Burger

Laws applied
- U.S. Const. amends. I, XIV

Smith v. Goguen, 415 U.S. 566 (1974), is a decision of the Supreme Court of the United States in which the Court held that a Massachusetts flag desecration law that prohibited "publicly treat[ing] contemptuously the flag of the United States" was unconstitutionally void for vagueness.

== See also ==
- West Virginia Board of Education v. Barnette, 319 U.S. 624 (1943)
- Stromberg v. California, 283 U.S. 359 (1931)
