= Speiser v. Randall =

- Supreme Court of the United States

Argued April 8–9, 1958 Decided June 30, 1958
- Full case name: Lawrence Speiser v. Randall, Assessor of Contra Costa County, California
- Citations: 357 U.S. 513 (more) 78 S. Ct. 1332; 2 L. Ed. 2d 1460; 1958 U.S. LEXIS 1803

Holding
- Loyalty oath requirement for tax exemption violated taxpayers' procedural due process rights under the Fifth Amendment.

Court membership
- Chief Justice Earl Warren Associate Justices Hugo Black · Felix Frankfurter; William O. Douglas · Harold H. Burton; Tom C. Clark · John M. Harlan II; William J. Brennan Jr. · Charles E. Whittaker

Case opinions
- Majority: Brennan, joined by Black, Frankfurter, Douglas, Harlan, Whittaker
- Concurrence: Black, joined by Douglas
- Concurrence: Douglas, joined by Black
- Concurrence: Burton (in judgment)
- Dissent: Clark
- Warren took no part in the consideration or decision of the case.

Speiser v. Randall, 357 U.S. 513 (1958), is a decision of the Supreme Court of the United States which, along with its companion cases Prince v. City and County of San Francisco and First Unitarian Church v. Los Angeles (separately decided), held that a loyalty oath requirement for seeking a property tax exemption violated the procedural due process rights of applicants who refused to sign the oath under the Due Process Clause of the Fifth Amendment to the United States Constitution because it placed the burden of proof to show that their speech was not criminal on the applicants, rather than the state.

== See also ==
- List of United States Supreme Court cases involving the First Amendment
- List of United States Supreme Court cases, volume 357
