= Hannegan v. Esquire, Inc. =

- Supreme Court of the United States

Argued January 11, 1946 Decided February 4, 1946
- Full case name: Robert E. Hannegan, Postmaster General v. Esquire, Inc.
- Citations: 327 U.S. 146 (more) 66 S.Ct. 456; 90 L. Ed. 586; 1946 U.S. LEXIS 2808

Case history
- Prior: Dismissed, 55 F. Supp. 1015 (D.D.C.); rev'd, 151 F.2d 49 (D.C. Cir.); cert. granted, 326 U.S. 708 (1945).

Holding
- The Postmaster General is without power to prescribe standards for the literature or the art which a mailable periodical (not obscene) disseminates, or to determine whether the contents of the periodical meet some standard of the public good or welfare.

Court membership
- Chief Justice Harlan F. Stone Associate Justices Hugo Black · Stanley F. Reed; Felix Frankfurter · William O. Douglas; Frank Murphy · Robert H. Jackson; Wiley B. Rutledge · Harold H. Burton

Case opinions
- Majority: Douglas, joined by Stone, Black, Reed, Frankfurter, Murphy, Rutldge, Burton
- Concurrence: Frankfurter
- Jackson took no part in the consideration or decision of the case.

Laws applied
- 39 U.S.C. § 221 (1946) (Section 7 of the Classification Act of 1879)

Hannegan v. Esquire, Inc., 327 U.S. 146 (1946), was a U.S. Supreme Court case argued between the United States Postal Service and Esquire magazine. In a unanimous decision, the Supreme Court ruled that the USPS was without statutory authority to revoke a periodical's second class permit on the basis of objectionable material that was not obscene.

== Background ==
Hannegan v. Esquire, Inc. was the culmination of a bitter legal battle between Esquire magazine and the USPS that began in 1943. Taking offense to the Varga Girl and other pin-up style imagery, Postmaster General Frank Comerford Walker convened a hearing board in October 1943 to determine whether Esquire contained obscenity. A host of national figures were called in as witnesses to offer their "expertise" on whether the Varga Girl and other Esquire content was obscene, among them H. L. Mencken and Rev. Peter Marshall. The press had a field-day covering the affair and ridiculing the Postmaster General and his department. When the hearing board ruled 2–1 in favor of Esquire, Postmaster General Walker refused to accept their decision, and revoked Esquire's second-class mailing privileges. Esquire then filed suit in federal district court to enjoin the revocation order. Visiting Judge T. Whitfield Davidson ruled in favor of the Post Office in Esquire vs. Walker. Esquire appealed to the U.S. Court of Appeals where Judge Thurman Arnold reversed the decision. Postmaster General Frank Walker (who was succeeded by Robert Hannegan in June 1945) appealed the case to the Supreme Court. In 1946 the Supreme Court handed down a unanimous decision in favor of Esquire.

== Opinion of the Court ==
Justice William O. Douglas wrote the opinion for the court:

To uphold the order of revocation would, therefore, grant the Postmaster General a power of censorship. Such a power is so abhorrent to our traditions that a purpose to grant it should not be easily inferred ... To withdraw the second-class rate from this publication today because its contents seemed to one official not good for the public would sanction withdrawal of the second-class rate tomorrow from another periodical whose social or economic views seemed harmful to another official ... Congress has left the Postmaster General with no power to prescribe standards for the literature or the art which a mailable periodical disseminates.

The Hannegan v. Esquire, Inc. decision had important social implications for postwar society. The decision sanctioned the pin-up as a socially acceptable cultural symbol, and helped spur an unprecedented increase in pornographic magazines during the 1950s.
