= Communist Party of Indiana v. Whitcomb =

- Supreme Court of the United States

Argued October 16, 1973 Decided January 9, 1974
- Full case name: Communist Party of Indiana v. Whitcomb
- Citations: 414 U.S. 441 (more) 94 S. Ct. 656; 38 L. Ed. 2d 635

Holding
- States may not prohibit political parties from being on the ballot, if the party merely advocates violent overthrow of government as an abstract principle.

Court membership
- Chief Justice Warren E. Burger Associate Justices William O. Douglas · William J. Brennan Jr. Potter Stewart · Byron White; Thurgood Marshall · Harry Blackmun; Lewis F. Powell Jr. · William Rehnquist

Case opinions
- Majority: Brennan, joined by Douglas, Stewart, White, Marshall
- Concurrence: Powell, joined by Burger, Blackmun, Rehnquist

Laws applied
- U.S. Const. amends. I, XIV

Communist Party of Indiana v. Whitcomb, 414 U.S. 441 (1974), was a United States Supreme Court case based on the First Amendment to the U.S. Constitution that invalidated Indiana's loyalty oath requirement.

== Summary ==
The state of Indiana, for the 1972 election, required nominees to submit a sworn oath stating that their party "does not advocate the overthrow of local, state or national government by force or violence." The Communist Party of Indiana refused to submit such a declaration, and as a result Indiana refused to put their candidates on the ballot. The Communist Party appealed to the Supreme Court.

In a unanimous verdict, the Supreme Court held in favor of the Communist Party. The majority opinion, authored by Justice William J. Brennan, Jr. and joined by four other Justices, stated that "a group advocating violent overthrow as abstract doctrine need not be regarded as necessarily advocating unlawful action." The court also held that "the principle that the constitutional guarantees of free speech and free press do not permit a State to forbid or proscribe advocacy of the use of force or of law violation except where such advocacy is directed to inciting or producing imminent lawless action and is likely to produce such action."

Justice Lewis F. Powell, Jr. wrote a short opinion concurring in the judgment, joined by three other Justices. In his view, there is no need to decide the free speech question. Instead, he concluded that as the Indiana officials did not apply the loyalty oath requirement to the Democratic Party and the Republican Party, their discriminatory application of the requirement to the Communist Party violated the Equal Protection Clause of the Fourteenth Amendment.

== See also ==
- List of United States Supreme Court cases involving the First Amendment
- List of United States Supreme Court cases, volume 414
