= City of Ladue v. Gilleo =

- Supreme Court of the United States

Argued February 23, 1994 Decided June 13, 1994
- Full case name: City of Ladue, et al. v. Margaret P. Gilleo
- Citations: 512 U.S. 43 (more) 114 S. Ct. 2038; 129 L. Ed. 2d 36

Case history
- Prior: Gilleo v. City of Ladue, 986 F.2d 1180 (8th Cir. 1993)

Holding
- A municipal ordinance aiming to reduce visual clutter through the regulation of signs in the yards of private homes that prohibits protected speech may violate the First Amendment if the ordinance cannot pass strict scrutiny.

Court membership
- Chief Justice William Rehnquist Associate Justices Harry Blackmun · John P. Stevens; Sandra Day O'Connor · Antonin Scalia; Anthony Kennedy · David Souter; Clarence Thomas · Ruth Bader Ginsburg

Case opinions
- Majority: Stevens, joined by unanimous
- Concurrence: O'Connor

Laws applied
- U.S. Const. Amend. I

City of Ladue v. Gilleo, 512 U.S. 43 (1994), was a free speech decision of the Supreme Court of the United States. It was a case challenging the legality of a city ordinance restricting the placement of signs in the yards of residents of Ladue, Missouri.

== Background ==
Margaret P. Gilleo was a resident of Ladue, Missouri. On December 8, 1990, she placed a sign measuring 3 feet by 2 feet in her front yard that read, "Say no to war in the Persian Gulf. Call Congress now.”

The sign disappeared, so Gilleo erected yet another. After this sign was pulled out of the ground and tossed in her yard, Gilleo filed a complaint with the police, who informed her that such signs were prohibited by a local ordinance as a form of "visual pollution".

Ladue had a broad ban on signs, making exceptions for only ten instances, including residential markers, home sale signs, commercial signs in properly-zoned areas, etc.

With help from the American Civil Liberties Union, Gilleo filed suit in federal court against the city, Mayor Edith Spinks, and the members of the city council after they refused her a variance. The district court struck down the ordinance as unconstitutional, and this decision was affirmed by the appeals court.

== Opinion of the Court ==
The Supreme Court unanimously affirmed the ruling of the Appeals Court. Justice Stevens, writing for the majority, expressed the Court's suspicion of regulations eliminating an entire form of communication, in this case signs. While Ladue alleged that this regulation was permissible as a restriction on "time, place, and manner" since residents could express themselves via other means, the Court found that there were no means that would be adequate substitutes. Ladue had also argued that its regulation was content neutral, but this did not satisfy the Court, which still found that the regulation prevented too much speech that is protected.

In the opinion,

Although Ladue has a concededly valid interest in minimizing visual clutter, it has almost completely foreclosed an important and distinct medium of expression to political, religious, or personal messages. Prohibitions foreclosing entire media may be completely free of content or viewpoint discrimination, but such measures can suppress too much speech by eliminating a common means of speaking.

Also,

Displaying a sign from one's own residence carries a message quite distinct from placing the same sign someplace else, or conveying the same text or picture by other means, for it provides information about the speaker's identity, an important component of many attempts to persuade.

And

A special respect for individual liberty in the home has long been part of this Nation's culture and law and has a special resonance when the government seeks to constrain a person's ability to speak there.
