= Howard v. Arkansas =

American legal case

Ark. Dep't of Human Servs. v. Howard
- Court: Arkansas Supreme Court
- Full case name: Arkansas Department of Human Services and Child Welfare Agency Review Board, Appellants, v. Matthew Lee Howard, Craig Stoopes, Anne Shelley, and William Wagner, Appellees.
- Decided: June 29, 2006
- Citations: 367 Ark. 55, 238 S.W.3d 1, 2006 Ark. LEXIS 418

Case history
- Prior actions: The trial court held the policy unconstitutional in Sands v. Child Welfare Agency Review Bd., No. 60CV-99-9881 (Cir. Ct. Pulaski Cty. Dec. 29, 2004) (Timothy Fox, J.).

Court membership
- Judges sitting: Hannah, C.J.; Corbin, Gunter, Dickey, Imber, and Brown, JJ.; and Franklin A. Poff, Jr., Special Justice. Glaze, J., did not participate.

Case opinions
- Corbin, J., wrote the court's opinion, and Robert L. Brown, J., concurred.

Keywords
- adoption, LGBT rights

Arkansas Department of Human Services v. Howard, 367 Ark. 55, 238 S.W.3d 1 (2006), is a decision by the Arkansas Supreme Court in which the court unanimously overturned a state policy banning gay adults and their housemates from being foster parents.

== Background ==
In 1999 the Arkansas Child Welfare Agency Review Board established a policy that "no person may serve as a foster parent if any adult member of that person's household is a homosexual." The ACLU then sued the board in the Circuit Court of Pulaski County on behalf of William Wagner, Matthew Lee Howard, and Anne Shelley—three adults who wanted to serve as foster parents but were rejected under the policy. Howard was a teacher who was already raising two children with his same-sex partner of nineteen years, Shelley was a lesbian who wanted to serve as a foster parent, and Wagner was a married heterosexual whose gay son sometimes lived at his home.

== Decision ==
After hearing extensive evidence and expert testimony about the scientific research on lesbian and gay parents, the circuit court found that the board had no factual support for its belief that gay people were less fit to be foster parents. In particular, the court found that the facts demonstrate that there is no correlation between the health, welfare, and safety of foster children and the blanket exclusion of any individual who is a homosexual or who lives in a household with a homosexual." The court also found that the policy may have hurt children by "excluding a pool of effective foster parents"; children raised by gay parents are not more likely to have "psychological, behavioral, or academic" problems; and that there is "no factual basis for saying that heterosexual parents might be better able to guide children through adolescence than gay parents." The circuit court ruled against the board, and the board appealed from that decision to the Arkansas Supreme Court.

The supreme court upheld the circuit court's decision because, without any factual basis for the board's policy, the board had usurped the legislature's role and had attempted to enforce a standard of morality." The board's policy therefore violated the separation of powers. And, "[b]ecause the Board acted outside the scope of its authority and infringed upon a legislative function," the supreme court could not say that the circuit court was in error.

== Aftermath ==
In 2007 the Arkansas House Judiciary Committee voted to reject SB 959, "a bill that would have banned gay people and most unmarried heterosexual couples who live together from adopting or serving as foster parents."

The bill would have been an end-run on the Supreme Court decision in Howard, as it would have had the same effect while side-stepping the separation of powers problem. In November 2008, voters approved Arkansas Proposed Initiative Act No. 1, which banned anyone living with a partner he or she isn't married to from adopting or providing a foster home to minors. The ACLU filed suit in state court on behalf of several Arkansas families challenging Act 1 as unconstitutional. The Arkansas Supreme Court struck down Act 1 on April 7, 2011.
