= Stewart v. Heineman =

2017 Nebraska Supreme Court case

- Court: Nebraska Supreme Court
- Full case name: Greg STEWART et al., appellees, v. Dave HEINEMAN, in his official capacity as Governor of Nebraska, et al., appellants.
- Argued: January 5, 2017
- Decided: April 7, 2017
- Citation: 296 Neb. 262

Case history
- Appealed from: Lancaster County District Court
- Appealed to: Nebraska Supreme Court

Outcome
- Affirmed Lancaster County District Court's ruling

Holding
- Nebraska's ban on same-sex couples being licensed as foster parents stricken.

Court membership
- Chief judge: Michael G. Heavican
- Associate judges: John F. Wright, Lindsey Miller-Lerman, William B. Cassel, Stephanie F. Stacy, Max J. Kelch, and Jeffrey J. Funke

Stewart v. Heineman, 296 Neb. 262, was a Nebraska Supreme Court case decided on April 7, 2017. The Court upheld the lower court's decision that struck down Nebraska's ban on same-sex couples being licensed as foster parents.

== Background ==
A 1995 Nebraska administrative memorandum prohibited individuals or couples in same-sex relationships from being licensed as foster parents. The plaintiffs, three same-sex couples, filed suit against the defendants, Dave Heineman, former Governor of Nebraska; Kerry Winterer, former chief executive officer of the Department of Health and Human Services (DHHS); and Thomas Pristow, former director of the Division of Children and Family Services.

The Plaintiffs sought to enjoin the Defendants from enforcing the administrative memo and from restricting same-sex couples and individuals from becoming foster parents. The Plaintiffs were represented by the American Civil Liberties Union (ACLU), the ACLU of Nebraska, and the law firm Sullivan & Cromwell LLP, who filed the lawsuit in state court on August 27, 2013. The Plaintiffs argued that the policy was unconstitutional because it treated same-sex couples differently, violated their personal liberties, and subjected them to sexual orientation-based prejudice.

In August 2015, Lancaster County District Judge John Colborn ruled in favor of the Plaintiffs, ordering the memorandum be rescinded and stricken and that state actors “refrain from adopting or applying policies, procedures, or review processes that treat Gay and Lesbian individuals and couples differently from similarly situated heterosexual individuals and couples when evaluating foster care or adoption applicants."

== Appeal ==
The Defendants appealed on the grounds of lack of standing, lack of case and controversy, and mootness.

== Decision ==
The case was argued on January 5, 2017. The Nebraska Supreme Court disagreed with Defendants' arguments and decided that the case was ripe for judicial review and not moot. The Court subsequently affirmed the lower court's decision.

== See also ==
- Nebraska Supreme Court
- LGBTQ rights in Nebraska
