= Abdel-Moniem El-Ganayni =

Egyptian nuclear physicist (born 1950)

Abdel-Moniem ibn Ali El-Ganayni
- عبد المنعم بن علي الجنايني
- Born: 1950 (age 75–76); Minyat Samannoud, Egypt
- Occupation: Physicist

Abdel-Moniem ibn Ali El-Ganayni (Arabic: عبد المنعم بن علي الجنايني) is an Egyptian-American nuclear physicist, former prison Imam, and an active member of the Pittsburgh Muslim community. In 2007 El-Ganayni's U.S. security clearance was revoked, and he subsequently lost his job as a senior scientist at Bettis Atomic Power Laboratory.

== Biography ==
El-Ganayni was born in Minyat Samannoud, Egypt, in 1950. His father, Sheikh Ali ibn Abdel-Moniem El-Ganayni (الشيخ علي بن عبدالمنعم الجنايني) was educated at the prestigious Al-Azhar University, where he completed his elementary, secondary, and high school studies. Sheikh Ali proceeded to the Al-Azhar Faculty of Islamic Law, where he completed the equivalent of a bachelor's degree. He continued his studies to the graduate level, obtaining the equivalent of a Ph.D. in Islamic law (العالمية), and later a certification to practice law (إجازة القضاء الشرعي).

In 1973, El-Ganayni obtained his Bachelor of Science in physics from Ain Shams University in Cairo, Egypt. He went on to pursue a master's in nuclear physics and completed his degree in 1978.

In 1980 El-Ganayni moved to the United States to complete his Ph.D., obtaining a second master's degree in nuclear physics from the University of Pittsburgh in 1983. Between 1984 and 1989 El-Ganayni worked as a teaching assistant in the department of physics, and completed his Ph.D. in atomic physics in 1990. He became an American citizen in 1988.

Shortly after completing his graduate studies, El-Ganayni was hired by Westinghouse Electric Company, working in the Bettis Atomic Power Laboratory as a senior scientific programmer, and later as a senior scientist. Throughout his employment at Bettis he received positive reviews, authored and coauthored a number of academic papers, and contributed to numerous projects.

El-Ganayni's contributions were not limited to scientific endeavors; he is a founding member of the Islamic Center of Pittsburgh, served two terms as the center's president, and helped to establish the mosque's current location in Schenley Heights. For close to a decade, El-Ganayni worked and volunteered as an Imam at correctional facilities in both Ohio and Pennsylvania. Part of El-Ganayni's prison outreach included the creation of the PA DOC Monitor, a website examining the condition, and necessary reform of the Department of Corrections.

== Loss of Security Clearance, Employment ==
El-Ganayni's work at Bettis Atomic Power Laboratory required the possession of a Department of Energy (DOE) issued security clearance, enabling him to work with classified information. In October 2007 El-Ganayni's security clearance was suspended, effectively barring him from any work at Bettis. DOE regulations stipulate that an individual may appeal a suspension, however El-Ganayni's right to appeal was denied in May 2008 when Jeffery F. Kupfer, deputy secretary of the DOE, invoked national security, refusing to reveal the government's allegations against Dr. El-Ganayni.

The suspension of El-Ganayni's security clearance was prefaced by an interview with DOE security officials, and later the Federal Bureau of Investigation (FBI). In these interviews, questions were asked regarding El-Ganayni's political beliefs, religious views, and his work as an Imam in the prison system. No questions related to his work or any potential breaches of security were asked in either interview.

The DOE officials instead focused on a seemingly innocent Islamic book entitled, "The Miracle of the Ant", authored by Turkish Islamic publisher Harun Yahya; unbeknownst to El-Ganayni, the content of Yahya's book was largely, if not completely duplicated from a Pulitzer Prize winning work entitled, "Journey to the Ants" published by Harvard University Press.

El-Ganayni distributed excerpts from the book to prisoners (both Muslim and non-Muslim) while serving as an Imam at Forest State Correctional Institution. DOE officials expressed concern over a purely scientific description of ants' biological defense mechanisms in a chapter entitled, "Defense and War Tactics" insinuating that El-Ganayni distributed this material with sinister intent, and subsequently questioned his allegiance to the United States of America. His supervisor at Forest, chaplaincy director Glenn McQuown reviewed the book and described it as "completely benign".

The interviews also focused on El-Ganayni's criticism of American foreign policy and the FBI's mistreatment of Muslims after September 11, 2001. Specifically, El-Ganayni raised concern over an FBI raid of a Pittsburgh mosque during Friday prayers, where attendees were searched and forced to stand outside while being questioned. Revocation of El-Ganayni's security clearance also may be related to his establishment of the PA DOC Monitor, a website and prison outreach program which critically examines the Pennsylvania Department of Corrections and its policies, insisting that drastic reform of the system is required for it to truly benefit prisoners and society at large.

== El-Ganayni vs. the United States Department of Energy et al.. ==
On June 26, 2008, the American Civil Liberties Union (ACLU) with Schnader, Harrison, Segal, and Lewis as co-counsels filed a lawsuit on behalf of El-Ganayni alleging that the DOE revoked his clearance due to criticism of the FBI and U.S. foreign policy. The suit demands that the DOE reveal their allegations against El-Ganayni and restore due process, allowing him to contest any allegations made against him. A hearing date has not been set as of July 28, 2008.

A motion for preliminary and permanent injunction against the U.S. Department of Energy and its acting director, Jeffrey Kupfer was filed on September 3, 2008 requesting the following:

- Assert that the court has jurisdiction over the case.
- Order the Energy Department to show Dr. El-Ganayni the evidence it claims to have against him.
- Order the Energy Department to hold a hearing where he can tell his side of the story, as provided in the agency's own rules for inquiries on sensitive security matters.

On September 25, 2008, the DOE filed a motion to dismiss El-Ganayni's preliminary and permanent injunction. On October 14, 2008 Dr. El-Ganayni's attorneys filed a brief in opposition of the DOE's motion to dismiss.

On October 31, 2008, Judge Terrence F. McVerry stated that the court "reluctantly concludes that it lacks subject-matter jurisdiction to adjudicate the claims made in Counts I and II of the Complaint" effectively granting the DOE's Motion to Dismiss in relation to Counts I and II. However, the court requested supplemental briefing regarding Count III, specifically concerning the DOE's interpretation, application, and adherence to executive procedure. Briefs from both the DOE and El-Ganayni's defense regarding Count III were submitted on November 14, 2008.

Judge McVerry ruled in favor of El-Ganayni and refused to dismiss Count III on November 20, 2008. In his court order McVerry stated that, "[the] Defendants' interpretation [of their own regulations] is not consistent with the actual text of the Executive Orders." This ruling was based on a DOE regulation stating that a clearance can only be revoked by a DOE agency head, not simply a Deputy Secretary. Subsequently, November 24, 2008, a day before a scheduled hearing to discuss pending motions, future direction of the litigation, and the possible scheduling of a preliminary injunction hearing, DOE secretary Samuel Bodman signed a revocation of El-Ganayni's clearance citing national security and the government requested a dismissal of the case. This dismissal was granted, however Dr. El-Ganayni appealed his case to the 3rd U.S. Circuit Court. Dr. El-Ganayni's brief for appeal of the dismissal was filed March 19, 2009, and a decision was made in the DOE's favor on January 11, 2010. In summation, the judges stated that the DOE is by extension part of the government's Executive Branch, and therefore the 3rd Circuit has no jurisdiction over the matter.

== Leaving the United States ==
On November 26, 2008, El-Ganayni and his wife left to Egypt after residing in the United States for 28 years. El-Ganayni stated that he would rather return to his birthplace than live in America as a second-class citizen and that he "feel[s] very sad that the American people have lost a good bit of their Constitution," quoting John Adams who said, "once you lose your rights and liberties, it's very hard to get them back."
