= Curley v. NAMBLA =

2000 wrongful death lawsuit

Curley v. NAMBLA was a wrongful death lawsuit filed in the United States District Court for the District of Massachusetts in 2000, by Barbara and Robert Curley against the North American Man/Boy Love Association (NAMBLA), saying the organization had incited the men who kidnapped and murdered their young son. They sought $200 million in damages.

The American Civil Liberties Union of Massachusetts (ACLU-M) represented NAMBLA because of the issue of censorship of unpopular speech about sexuality. It succeeded on getting the suit dismissed, based on the specific legal issue that NAMBLA is organized as an association, not a corporation. The Curleys continued their suit against individual members of NAMBLA and its steering committee members. They finally dropped the lawsuit in 2008 because the court ruled that their only witness to incitement was not competent to testify. Soon after his son's murder, Curley had campaigned for the state to pass a bill to re-establish use of the death penalty, but he changed his position and in 2007 opposed it.

== Background ==
In 1997, Barbara and Robert Curley's 10-year-old son Jeffrey was kidnapped, raped and murdered by two men, Salvatore Sicari, 21, and Charlie Jaynes, 22. Jeffrey was a latchkey child and knew Sicari from the neighborhood, as he lived only a block away. The two men befriended Jeffrey, taking him on car rides to diners. They offered to replace his recently stolen bicycle with a new one in exchange for sex. When Jeffrey refused, Jaynes killed him in the car's backseat. Sicari confessed to his part in the murder but insisted that Jaynes committed the murder. NAMBLA literature and a membership card was found in the backseat of the car and in Jaynes' apartment. Sicari was convicted of first-degree murder and Jaynes was convicted of second-degree murder and kidnapping.

Following his son's murder, Robert Curley campaigned for Massachusetts to reinstate capital punishment, which had been ruled unconstitutional in 1975. A bill to do so failed on a tie vote in the Massachusetts House of Representatives shortly after his son's murder. The legislation, which was supported by Governor Paul Cellucci, initially passed, but failed after a single representative, John P. Slattery, changed his mind after the Louise Woodward case. He also expressed concern over the bill providing insufficient protection to minorities and not exempting juvenile offenders from execution. Robert Curley later changed his position and in 2007 opposed death penalty legislation.

== Lawsuit ==
The Curleys filed a civil suit against NAMBLA in 2000, seeking $200 million in damages. It charged that NAMBLA's "adult-child sexual relationship propaganda", including Jaynes' viewing of the group's website, caused his violent predatory behavior and urge to rape young male children.

The suit was based on the fact that the convicted murderer had NAMBLA materials and had been found to have visited the group's website. The ACLU said that the suit against NAMBLA highlighted censorship of unpopular speech about sexuality. According to Wendy Kaminer, a longtime ACLU executive, the case was based on "widespread biases about a supposed link between homosexuality and pedophilia"; in fact, studies have shown that children are more likely to be preyed upon by heterosexuals in their extended families.

Proving the incitement is difficult given the First Amendment to the U.S. Constitution standards that govern words in any medium. At the time, Internet use was much less common, so the point rested on the court's viewing the Internet as such a different media as to warrant a different legal standard. Despite the lawsuit's claims, the NAMBLA website displayed no erotica, nor conspiracies to rape or incitements to violence.

In Brandenburg v. Ohio, 395 U.S. 444 (1969), the US Supreme Court held that government cannot punish inflammatory speech unless it is directed to inciting and likely to incite imminent lawless action. In September 2001, the court declined the defense's request for summary judgment, because Brandenburg "does not foreclose liability 'on any set of facts that might be shown'" as to incitement just by NAMBLA's publications, meetings and website. But the court dismissed the suit based on the specific legal issue that NAMBLA is organized as an association, not a corporation.

The Curleys continued the suit as a wrongful death action against individual NAMBLA members and NAMBLA Steering Committee members.

The Curleys dropped the lawsuit in 2008. They had only one witness prepared to testify that NAMBLA somehow incited one of the convicted criminals in the murder of their son, and the judge ruled the witness was not competent to testify. Robert Curley said, "That was the only link we were counting on ... When they ruled that out, that was the end of the line."

== Effects ==
NAMBLA had been the subject of several law enforcement sting operations and raids. It had also been accused of links in several high-profile child abduction cases, such as the 1979 Etan Patz case in New York City. The initial suspect was known to be attracted to young boys, but was eventually determined not to be Patz's murderer. In February 2017, Pedro Hernandez, a clerk in a local bodega in 1979, was convicted of the kidnapping and murder of Patz, based on confessions to police. He is said to have a low IQ and mental health issues.

NAMBLA denied any connections to crimes, but their public image was already permanently damaged. A minority of gay men supported NAMBLA, which led to condemnation against gay men at large. Many within the gay male community have since campaigned to make clear that they do not have any ties to the organization.
