= American Civil Liberties Union v. Department of Defense =

- Court: United States District Court for the Southern District of New York
- Full case name: American Civil Liberties Union, et al. v. Department of Defense, et al.
- Decided: September 29, 2005
- Docket nos.: 1:04-cv-04151
- Citation: 389 F. Supp. 2d 547

Case history
- Subsequent actions: Motion for reconsideration denied, 396 F. Supp. 2d 459 (S.D.N.Y. 2005); relief denied, 406 F. Supp. 2d 330 (S.D.N.Y. 2005); additional photographs ordered released (S.D.N.Y. June 9, 2006 and June 21, 2006); affirmed, 543 F.3d 59 (2d Cir. 2008); vacated and remanded, DOD v. American Civil Liberties Union, 558 U.S. 1042 (2009)

Court membership
- Judge sitting: Alvin Hellerstein

American Civil Liberties Union v. Department of Defense, No. 1:04-cv-04151, 389 F. Supp. 2d 547 (S.D.N.Y. 2005) (ACLU v. DoD), is a case in United States Federal Court, wherein the American Civil Liberties Union sued the Department of Defense and the Central Intelligence Agency under the Freedom of Information Act for the release of still-secret materials —specifically those related to abuse at Abu Ghraib prison in Baghdad, Iraq, during the U.S. military Occupation of Iraq. The case was brought in 2004. According to already public reports, the abuse began in mid-2003 and was ended in late 2003. Public news reports of the abuse first appeared in April 2004.

Since 2003, the government has released more than 100,000 pages. These documents show both that hundreds of prisoners were tortured in the custody of the CIA and Department of Defense, and that the torture policies were devised and developed at the highest levels of the Bush administration.

In late September, 2005, Federal Judge Alvin Hellerstein, though affirming the Glomar response ("can neither confirm nor deny") for some documents, found that the ACLU case for FOIA disclosure was stronger, and that the Glomar application to certain documents was not valid.
