= Glomar response =

Answer of "neither confirm nor deny"

In United States law, the term Glomar response, also known as Glomarization or Glomar denial, means to respond evasively to a question with the phrase "neither confirm nor deny" (NCND). For example, in response to a request for police reports relating to a certain person, the police agency may respond: "We can neither confirm nor deny that our agency has any records matching your request." The phrase was notably used to respond to requests for information about the Glomar Explorer.

In national or subnational freedom of information policies, governments are often required to tell people who request information (e.g. journalists or attorneys) whether they located the requested records, even if the records end up being kept secret. But at times, a government may determine that the mere act of truthfully disclosing that the records do or do not exist would pose some actual or possible harm, such as to national security, the integrity of an ongoing investigation, or a person's privacy. For example, disclosing that a police department has documents about a current investigation into a criminal conspiracy, even if the content of the documents is not disclosed, would make it public that an investigation is happening; in response, suspects could destroy evidence or even murder those who they feel may testify against them.

Glomar responses are commonly associated with the United States Freedom of Information Act (FOIA), which generally dictates how federal agencies must disclose information. The term "Glomar" originated in association with the FOIA law. Lower courts have thus far ruled the Glomar response to have potential merit if the secretive nature of the material truly requires it, and only if the agency provides "as much information as possible" to justify its claim. Otherwise, the principles established in FOIA may outweigh claims to secrecy.

== Origin of the term ==
The phrase itself, "neither confirm nor deny", has long appeared frequently in news reports, as an alternative to a "no comment" response when the respondent does not wish to answer. In 1911, for example, the Boston and Maine Railroad told The Boston Globe it would "neither confirm nor deny" reports about its future plans. In 1916, Ford representatives said they would "neither confirm nor deny" that price cuts were in the offing for its popular Model-T automobile. When the governor of Kansas was questioned in 1920 about a report addressing a state official's potential ouster, he responded that he would "neither confirm nor deny" the report's existence.

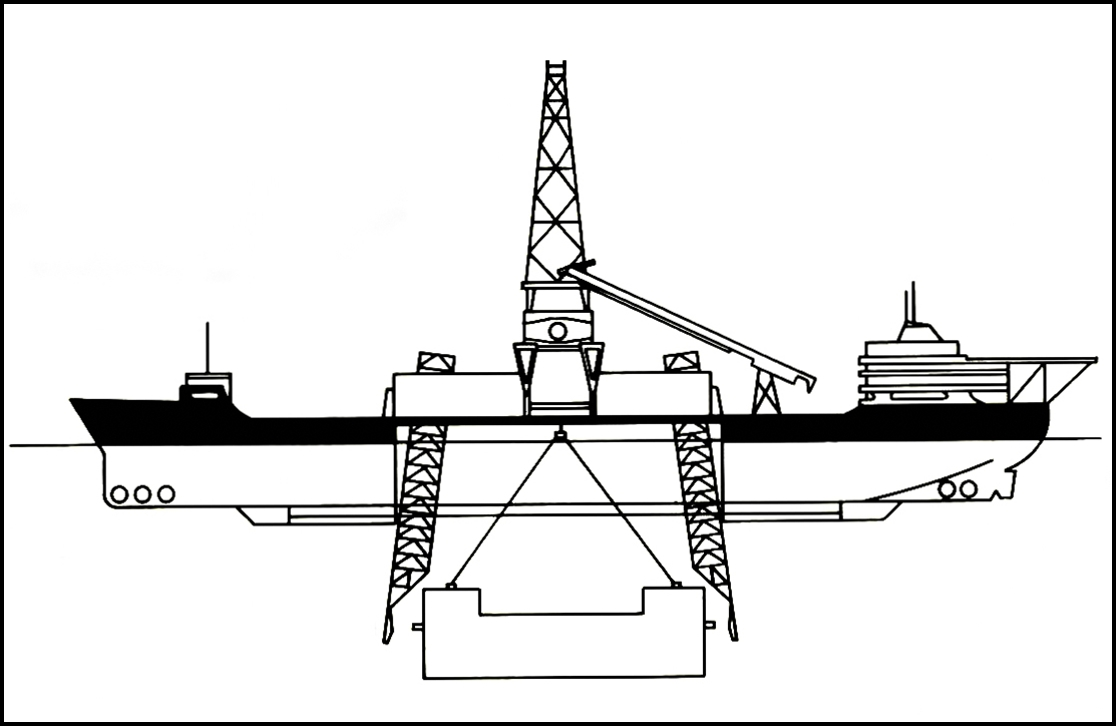
Hughes Glomar Explorer

The USNS Hughes Glomar Explorer was a large salvage vessel built by the Central Intelligence Agency (CIA) for its covert "Project Azorian"—an attempted salvaging of a sunken Soviet submarine. "Glomar" is the syllabic abbreviation of Global Marine Development, the company commissioned by the CIA to build the Glomar Explorer. In February 1975, the CIA became aware of a story awaiting publication in the Los Angeles Times. Journalist Harriet Ann Phillippi requested that the CIA provide disclosure of both the Glomar project and its attempts to censor the story. In response, the CIA chose to "neither confirm nor deny" both the project's existence and its attempts to keep the story unpublished.

In a subsequent lawsuit, Phillippi requested "all records relating to the Director's or any other agency personnel's attempts to persuade" media to refrain from publishing further stories about the clandestine project. Additionally, she asked the court to demand the Agency to provide a "detailed justification" for the information said to be "exempt from disclosure." The government responded with a motion for summary judgement, which the district court granted, stating that the materials were "exempt from disclosure under the provision of the third exemption of 5 U.S.C. § 552(b)(3). This claim stood, and Phillippi's Freedom of Information Act (FOIA) request was rejected.

In 1976, Phillippi appealed, arguing that the Agency "should have been required to support its position on the basis of the public record. This means that the Agency should have to provide a public record "explaining in as much detail as is possible the basis for its claim that it can be required neither to confirm nor to deny the existence of the records." This request was refuted through a Government affidavit, arguing that because an official acknowledgement of the existence or nonexistence of a certain project could "severely damage the foreign relations and the national defense of the United States." However, the affidavit used was actually already submitted in another case, Military Audit Project v. Bush, (where the plaintiff wanted copies of contracts for construction and operation of Glomar Explorer). In its holding, the Court of Appeals for the District of Columbia Circuit stated that "we cannot sustain summary judgment for the [Government] on the basis of documents filed (the Military Audit Project affidavit) in a separate case concerned with different, although related, issues." The case was remanded.

Although the Ford administration was replaced by the Carter administration in 1977 after the 1976 presidential election, and the government's position on the matter changed, the D.C. Circuit Court of Appeals affirmed the grant of summary judgement in favor of the CIA.

The "Glomar response" precedent still stood, and has since had bearing in FOIA cases such as in the 2004 lawsuit American Civil Liberties Union v. Department of Defense, wherein Federal Judge Alvin Hellerstein rejected the Department of Defense and CIA's use of the Glomar response in refusing to release documents and photos depicting abuse at Abu Ghraib prison.

According to a Radiolab podcast, the original text of the Glomar response was written by the Associate General Counsel at the CIA, under the pseudonym of Walt Logan. So as not to divulge to the Soviet Union either what the CIA knew or did not know, the response read:

We can neither confirm nor deny the existence of the information requested but, hypothetically, if such data were to exist, the subject matter would be classified, and could not be disclosed.

The original text of the CIA's reply of May 21, 1975, to Phillippi's FOIA request, seems to have been:

Mr. Duckett has determined that, in the interest of national security, involvement by the U.S. Government in the activities which are the subject matter of your request can neither be confirmed nor denied. Therefore, he has determined that the fact of the existence or non-existence of any material or documents that may exist which would reveal any CIA connection or interest in the activities of the Glomar Explorer is duly classified Secret in accordance with criteria established by Executive Order 11652. Acknowledgement of the existence or non-existence of the information you request could reasonably be expected to result in the compromise of important intelligence operations and significant scientific and technological developments relating to the national security, and might also result in a disruption in foreign relations significantly affecting the national security.

In 2014, the CIA opened its Twitter account with, "We can neither confirm nor deny that this is our first tweet."

== See also ==
- No comment
- Plausible deniability
- Policy of deliberate ambiguity
- Schrödinger's cat
- Warrant canary
