= Schlesinger v. Holtzman =

- Supreme Court of the United States

Decided August 4, 1973
- Full case name: James R. Schlesinger, et al. v. Elizabeth Holtzman, et al.
- Citations: 414 U.S. 1321 (more) 94 S. Ct. 11; 38 L. Ed. 2d 33

Case history
- Prior: Granting injunction against bombing campaign, 361 F. Supp. 553 (E.D.N.Y. 1973), denying application to vacate stay of injunction, 414 U.S. 1304 (Marshall, J., in chambers), granting reapplication to vacate stay of injunction, 414 U.S. 1316 (Douglas, J., in chambers), granting application to vacate ruling by Justice Douglas, staying order of the District Court, 414 U.S. 1321 (1973).
- Subsequent: Removing injunction and dismissing lawsuit, 484 F.2d 1307 (2d Cir. 1973).

Holding
- The reapplication for a stay is granted. The district court's order enjoining the Defense Department from participating in military activities in and over Cambodia is stayed pending further review.

Court membership
- Chief Justice Warren E. Burger Associate Justices William O. Douglas · William J. Brennan Jr. Potter Stewart · Byron White; Thurgood Marshall · Harry Blackmun; Lewis F. Powell Jr. · William Rehnquist

Case opinions
- Majority: Marshall, Circuit Justice (noting the agreement of Burger, Brennan, Stewart, White, Blackmun, Powell, and Rehnquist)
- Dissent: Douglas

Schlesinger v. Holtzman, 414 U.S. 1321 (1973), was a case decided by the Supreme Court of the United States involving the Constitution's War Powers Clause. The Court reversed a ruling by Justice William O. Douglas ordering the military to stop bombing Cambodia.

== Background ==
On April 29, 1970, President Richard Nixon ordered the Cambodian Campaign, a secret military invasion lacking congressional approval. Congress responded by passing the Cooper–Church Amendment, which defunded the invasion. Assistant Attorney General William Rehnquist wrote an Office of Legal Counsel memorandum advising that the Constitution's Commander in Chief clause should authorize President Nixon’s campaign anyway, and Rehnquist testified as to such before the United States House Committee on Foreign Affairs.

President Nixon then began Operation Freedom Deal, an extensive bombing campaign over most of Cambodia. In June 1973, Congress voted to discontinue funding of all combat activities in Cambodia. President Nixon vetoed the bill, which Congress narrowly failed to override. Congress and the President then agreed to the compromise Case–Church Amendment, which would end all bombing on August 15, 1973.

Brooklyn Congresswoman Elizabeth Holtzman voted against the compromise, then sued Defense Secretary James R. Schlesinger to immediately stop the bombings. On July 25, U.S. District Judge Orrin Grimmell Judd granted summary judgment for Congresswoman Holtzman and issued a permanent injunction ordering the military to refrain “from participating in any way in military activities in or over Cambodia or releasing any bombs which may fall in Cambodia.” Judge Judd gave the military until Friday, July 27, before his order would come into effect. On July 27, a unanimous panel of the United States Court of Appeals for the Second Circuit issued a stay of Judge Judd’s order until the next scheduled sitting of the court.

== Supreme Court ==
Congresswoman Holtzman next applied to Justice Thurgood Marshall, the Circuit Justice assigned to oversee the Second Circuit, to vacate the stay. Justice Marshall declined to order the military to stop bombing, on August 1, writing "the proper response to an arguably illegal action is not lawlessness by judges charged with interpreting and enforcing the laws. Down that road lies tyranny and repression." The Court was in recess for the summer but the Congresswoman reapplied, this time to outspoken war critic Justice William O. Douglas.

Justice Douglas met with the Congresswoman’s ACLU lawyers at his home in Goose Prairie, Washington and promised them a hearing the next day. On Friday, August 3, 1973, Justice Douglas held a hearing in the Yakima federal courthouse, where he dismissed the Government’s argument that he was causing a “constitutional confrontation” by saying, “we live in a world of confrontations. That’s what the whole system is about.” That night, Justice Douglas ordered the military to stop bombing, reasoning “denial of the application before me would catapult our airmen as well as Cambodian peasants into the death zone.”

The U.S. military ignored the new Supreme Court order. Six hours later, on August 4, Justice Marshall effectively undid Douglas’s ruling by staying the District Court’s injunction. Marshall contacted the other seven justices, and they agreed to this course of action, but the Court was not formally reconvened to reverse Douglas’s order.

== Subsequent developments ==
On August 6, the military accidentally bombed Neak Leung, killing at least 137 villagers. The Second Circuit heard argument of the appeal on Wednesday, August 8, and later that day, Circuit Judge William Hughes Mulligan joined by Circuit Judge William H. Timbers, reversed Judge Judd’s order and dismissed Congresswoman Holtzman's lawsuit. Circuit Judge James L. Oakes dissented, citing Federalist No. 69. On August 15, all direct U.S. military involvement in Indochina ended. The substantive case never reached the Supreme Court.

Congress next passed the War Powers Resolution, which requires the President to receive congressional approval for all new hostilities after sixty days. President Nixon vetoed the resolution, which Congress overwhelmingly overrode on November 7, 1973.

=== Significance ===
This case is significant because it challenges the legality of being able to operate the military on a "neutral" site. This case emphasizes the proper role of the judiciary to refrain from deciding political questions that are for the President and Congress to decide. Congress has declared war only 11 times and in only five wars: three times in 19th century wars, twice in World War I, and six times in World War II. The United States has fought in over 240 wars which were not declared, dating back to President George Washington.

== See also ==
- Bas v. Tingy (1800)
