= Danny Escobedo =

American petitioner (born 1937)

Danny Escobedo (born c. 1937) was a Chicago petitioner in the Supreme Court case of Escobedo v. Illinois, which established a criminal suspect's right to remain silent and to have an attorney present during questioning. This case was an important precedent to the famous Miranda v. Arizona decision.

== Case ==
Escobedo's brother-in-law Manuel was shot on the night of January 19, 1960, and Escobedo was arrested, without a warrant, at 2:30 a.m. the next day to be questioned. He was released at 5 p.m, that afternoon after Warren Wolfson, his lawyer, obtained a writ of habeas corpus, making no statement to the police. On January 30, Benedict DiGerlando, a man in police custody told the police that Escobedo had shot and killed Manuel. The police then arrested Escobedo, along with his sister, between 8 and 9 p.m. that day. He was then taken to the police headquarters and questioned without letting him speak to or even see his lawyer. During his questioning, Escobedo was tricked into saying he knew that DiGerlando had killed Manuel, making him an accomplice. He was then found guilty of first degree murder and was sentenced to jail for 20 years, with his "confession", which he had later recanted.

Escobedo then petitioned to the Illinois Supreme Court (where the conviction was affirmed) and then to the US Supreme Court. The US Supreme Court agreed to hear it and the case was titled Escobedo v. Illinois. The case was heard on April 29, 1964. Barry L. Kroll argued for Escobedo with Donald M. Haskell, and James R. Thompson argued for Illinois against Escobedo, with Daniel P. Ward and Elmer C. Kissane. Bernard Weisberg argued for the American Civil Liberties Union in favor of Escobedo, with Walter T. Fisher. The case was decided on June 22, 1964.

Justice Arthur Goldberg delivered the opinion of the court, which was in favor of Escobedo. The ruling reversed Escobedo's conviction and stated that "Under the circumstances of this case, where a police investigation is no longer a general inquiry into an unsolved crime but has begun to focus on a particular suspect in police custody who has been refused an opportunity to consult with his counsel and who has not been warned of his constitutional right to keep silent, the accused has been denied the assistance of counsel in violation of the Sixth and Fourteenth Amendments; and no statement extracted by the police during the interrogation may be used against him at a trial."

== Post trial ==
Escobedo became a drifter after his case was resolved, moving from job to job. He was arrested in 2001, outside Mexico City, Mexico, for federal probation violations and on a warrant issued in Illinois in connection with a 1983 stabbing death. Escobedo had been listed by the US Marshals Service as one of its 15 Most Wanted Fugitives prior to this arrest.

== See also ==
- Escobedo v. Illinois
