= Baggett v. Bullitt =

- Supreme Court of the United States

Argued March 24, 1964 Decided June 1, 1964
- Full case name: Baggett, et al. v. Bullitt, et al.
- Citations: 377 U.S. 360 (more) 84 S. Ct. 1316; 12 L. Ed. 2d 377; 1964 U.S. LEXIS 1140

Case history
- Prior: Appeal from the United States District Court for the Western District of Washington

Holding
- A State cannot require an employee to take an unduly vague oath containing a promise of future conduct at the risk of prosecution for perjury or loss of employment, particularly where the exercise of First Amendment freedoms may thereby be deterred.

Court membership
- Chief Justice Earl Warren Associate Justices Hugo Black · William O. Douglas; Tom C. Clark · John M. Harlan II; William J. Brennan Jr. · Potter Stewart; Byron White · Arthur Goldberg

Case opinions
- Majority: White, joined by Warren, Black, Douglas, Brennan, Stewart, Goldberg
- Dissent: Clark, joined by Harlan

Laws applied
- U.S. Const. amends. I, XIV

Baggett v. Bullitt, 377 U.S. 360 (1964), was a United States Supreme Court case in which the Court held that a state cannot require an employee to take an unduly vague oath containing a promise of future conduct at the risk of prosecution for perjury or loss of employment, particularly where the exercise of First Amendment freedoms may thereby be deterred.

== Background ==
Washington state passed two laws which required teachers and employees to swear oaths as a condition of employment. A 1931 law required them to swear allegiance to the United States. A 1955 law, passed in the McCarthyism era, required the employee to swear he is not a subversive person: that he does not commit, or advise, teach, abet or advocate another to commit or aid in the commission of any act intended to overthrow or alter, or assist in the overthrow or alteration, of the constitutional form of government by revolution, force or violence.

Faculty and staff of the University of Washington sued to overturn the laws.

== Opinion of the Court ==
The Supreme Court overturned both the 1931 law and 1955 law, holding that they were too vague, and that they violated the employees' First Amendment rights of association and speech.
