= Lee v. Washington =

- Supreme Court of the United States

Argued November 7, 1967 Decided March 11, 1968
- Full case name: Lee, Commissioner of Corrections of Alabama, et al. v. Washington, et al.
- Citations: 390 U.S. 333 (more) 88 S. Ct. 994; 19 L. Ed. 2d 1212; 1968 U.S. LEXIS 2223

Case history
- Prior: Washington v. Lee, 263 F. Supp. 327 (N.D. Ala. 1966)

Holding
- State jails and prisons may not segregate prisoners based on race.

Court membership
- Chief Justice Earl Warren Associate Justices Hugo Black · William O. Douglas; John M. Harlan II · William J. Brennan Jr. Potter Stewart · Byron White; Abe Fortas · Thurgood Marshall

Case opinions
- Per curiam
- Concurrence: Black, Harlan, and Stewart

Laws applied
- U.S. Const. amend. XIV

Lee v. Washington, 390 U.S. 333 (1968), is a United States Supreme Court decision that upheld an appeals court decision to forbid segregation of public prisons.

== Background ==
After Brown v. Board Alabama still had their jails, juvenile jails, and prisons segregated based on race. In 1966 12 years after that case was decided, the American Civil Liberties Union leader, Charles Morgan, Jr., filed a lawsuit against Alabama to get all the prisoners housed together. The United States District Court for the Northern District of Alabama found in favor of the prisoners. They ruled that the segregation was unconstitutional under the 14th amendment and ordered Alabama to desegregate its jails and prisons.

Alabama, then appealed to an Appellate court based on the fact that segregation was necessary in order to maintain security and minimize violence. Appeals court held that "this Court can conceive of no consideration of prison security or discipline which will sustain the constitutionality of state statutes that on their face require complete and permanent segregation of the races in all the Alabama penal facilities”. They did recognize that in some instances, isolation discipline necessities segregation based on race may be for a limited time, but nothing justifies the segregation of the races arbitrarily.

Then Alabama appealed to the Supreme Court in which Justices Black, Harlan, and Stewart collectively wrote a concurring opinion after a very brief per curiam opinion in which they explicitly say that "prison authorities have the right, acting in good faith and in particularized circumstances, to take into account racial tensions in maintaining security, discipline, and good order in prisons and jails".

== See also ==
- Brown v. Board of Education
