= State v. Dalton =

2003 Ohio legal case

- Court: Court of Appeals of Ohio
- Full case name: The State of Ohio, Appellee, v. Dalton, Appellant.
- Decided: July 17, 2003
- Citation: 153 Ohio App.3d 286

Court membership
- Judges sitting: Charles R. Petree II, William A. Klatt, J. Craig Wright (Note: Retired Justice of the Ohio Supreme Court, sitting under appointment)

Case opinions
- Majority: Klatt, joined by Petree, Wright

Keywords
- Child pornography laws; Freedom of speech; Obscenity law

State v. Dalton, 153 Ohio App.3d 286 (2003), is a legal case in the U.S. state of Ohio involving the prosecution of a man for recording fictional tales of alleged child pornography in a diary. The case received wide publicity because of the private nature of a diary and a novel application of state child pornography laws.

== Background ==
In 1998, Brian Dalton was charged with possession of child pornography; he pleaded guilty and was sentenced to 18 months in prison. He was released after four months and received three years' probation. After violating his probation by failing to attend a sex offender treatment program, he was arrested. His mother then informed his probation officer that she had found questionable material in his apartment—a journal. Dalton's journal was retrieved; it contained graphic depictions of the torture and rape of children. Police determined the depictions were fictional.

Dalton was charged with production and possession of child pornography. As part of a plea bargain, he pleaded guilty to one of the charges in July 2001. He was sentenced to seven years in prison, in addition to the remaining time from the first case. Dalton then attempted to change his guilty plea, to pursue an appeal. The trial court denied his request.

Dalton, supported by the American Civil Liberties Union, charged that the Ohio child pornography statute was unconstitutional. Ohio law forbids the possession of all child pornographic materials, including writings, while the U.S. Supreme Court has generally held that only the possession of obscene photographic depictions of actual children may be outlawed.

== Ruling of the Court ==
In July 2003, the Court of Appeals of Ohio vacated the conviction and allowed Dalton to retract his guilty plea, accepting his argument that he would not have pleaded guilty had he received effective assistance from his court-appointed lawyer. The court did not speak to the constitutional issues.

In November 2003, the Ohio Supreme Court declined, by a 5–2 vote, to take the case on further appeal. The case was sent back to trial court, and in March 2004, was dismissed. The trial judge held that "the charge did not meet the standard of the Ohio law that prosecutors used".
