= Florence v. Shurtleff =

2012 US federal court case

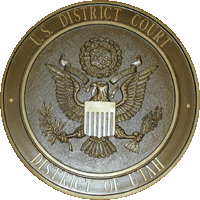
- Court: U.S. District Court for the District of Utah
- Argued: April 12, 2012
- Decided: May 15, 2012

Holding
- Individuals cannot be prosecuted for posting constitutionally protected content for adults on general-access websites. They are not required by the Utah law to label such content.

Court membership
- Judge sitting: Dee Benson

Laws applied
- First Amendment to the United States Constitution

Florence v. Shurtleff, Civil No. 2:05CV000485 (D. Utah 2012), was a case in which the U.S. District Court for the District of Utah issued an order stating that individuals could not be prosecuted for posting adult content that was constitutionally protected on general access websites, nor could they be civilly liable for failing to prevent access to adult content, so long as the material is identifiable by filtering software. The order was the result of a 2005 lawsuit, The King's English v. Shurtleff, brought by Utah bookstores, artists, Internet Service Providers and the other organizations challenging the constitutionality of certain portions of a Utah law intended to protect minors from adult content.

== Background ==
=== Facts ===
In March 2005, House Bill 260, amending and adding to the Utah Harmful to Minors Act, was passed by the Utah legislature and signed into law by Governor Jon Huntsman. The bill sought to "address pornographic material and material harmful to minors." Among other provisions, the bill required the Utah Attorney General to maintain an "adult content registry" of internet websites that contained material deemed "harmful to minors." The bill correspondingly required Internet service providers ("ISPs") to block access or provide filtering software for these websites. It also stated that Utah ISPs must properly label or block their content, with criminal and civil penalties on those who failed to do so.

In response to the Bill, an umbrella of organizations including Utah based bookstores, Internet Service Providers, the ACLU of Utah, Media Coalition and the Center for Democracy & Technology filed a federal lawsuit on June 9, 2005. The suit challenged the constitutionality of the bill under the First, Fifth and Fourteenth Amendments, as well as the Commerce Clause. This lawsuit was originally known as The King's English v. Shurtleff for a Utah bookshop named as plaintiffs in the lawsuit.

=== Procedural Posture ===
U.S. District Court Judge Dee Benson granted a preliminary injunction preventing enforcement of the law on August 25, 2006.

In response to the State of Utah's motion to dismiss for lack of standing, Judge Benson ruled on plaintiff's legal standing on November 29, 2007, finding that while the majority of the plaintiffs had standing, The King's English bookstore and other similar organizations did not. The judge denied plaintiff's motion for reconsideration, and the case was subsequently captioned as "Nathan Florence v. Shurtleff," now named for Florence, who was a Utah painter who depicted nudes in some of his works.

Plaintiffs filed a motion for summary judgment on June 8, 2011, seeking to enforce the injunction against HB 260 on a permanent basis. The State of Utah responded on July 29, 2011, with a combined brief opposing plaintiff's motion for summary judgment, and supporting its own motion for summary judgment and motion to dismiss for lack of standing.

The judge heard arguments on plaintiff's motion to dismiss on April 12, 2012.

On May 17, 2012, Judge Benson issued an order and declaratory judgment ruling that individuals and service providers could not be prosecuted under Section 1206 of the bill for making constitutionally protected adult content available on general access websites, and could not be subject to civil or criminal penalties under Section 1233 for failing to filter or block access to this content.

== Complaint ==
Plaintiffs filed their lawsuit on June 9, 2005, citing concerns of censorship, free speech and violations of the Commerce Clause. The Complaint challenged most of the act, apart from Sections 1 and 3. It specifically identified 5 provisions of the Act, which were challenged on constitutional bases:

1. Section 5 of the Act, which sought to extend the existing Utah law on materials harmful to minors (Utah Code § 76-10-1206) to Internet content providers and ISPs.
2. Section 9, or the Mandatory Labeling provision, which stated that Utah-based content providers were required to label their content, and imposed criminal penalties for failing to do so.
3. Section 2, which mandated the creation of an "adult content registry" by Attorney General Shurtleff, consisting of a list of websites that he identified as containing material "harmful to minors." Section 8, which correspondingly required ISPs to block access to websites that were listed in the registry.
4. Section 4, which required ISPs to block or restrict access to "pornographic material" as determined by their customers.
5. Section 7, which broadly required ISPs to restrict access to material "harmful to minors."

The plaintiffs argued that due to the "technical realities" of the Internet, it would be difficult for large ISPs to restrict access for one set of customers, and would instead result in restricting access across the network, and to non-requesting customers as well. The complaint also cited various cases in which courts in Michigan, New York, Arizona, and other states had struck down laws applying criminal penalties for "distributing harmful materials to minors" to the internet as unconstitutional, including the United States Supreme Court case Reno v. American Civil Liberties Union which struck down a federal version of the law on First Amendment Grounds. It identified a Pennsylvania state case, Center for Democracy & Technology v. Pappert where the United States District Court for the Eastern District of Pennsylvania struck down a state law requiring ISPs to restrict access to specific websites, on First Amendment and Commerce Clause claims. The complaint also contained declarations from various organizations and individuals, including The King's English bookstore, Nathan Florence and the ACLU of Utah explaining the adverse impact of the law on their business.

=== Constitutional Claims ===
Plaintiffs identified 8 causes of action in the complaint:

- Count 1 - Violation of Adults' Rights under the First Amendment and Fourteenth Amendment to the United States Constitution: Stated that the law was unconstitutional "on its face" as it imposed unfair restrictions and burdens upon constitutionally protected speech between adults.
- Count 2 - Violation of Minors' Rights Under the First and Fourteenth Amendments to the United States Constitution: Stated that the law prevented minors from lawfully accessing content that was protected by the First Amendment.
- Count 3 - Prior Restraint: Stated that the law deprived Plaintiffs of their ability to access and publish content to the Internet that was protected by the First Amendment.
- Count 4 - Inadequate Procedures: Stated that the law did not provide ISPs and other organizations with adequate procedural protections under the Fourteenth Amendment.
- Count 5 - Violation of the Right to Communicate and Access Information Anonymously Under the First and Fourteenth Amendments to the United States Constitution: Stated that in requiring users to identify themselves as adults in order to access protected content, the Act violated users' rights to anonymity under the First and Fourteenth Amendments.
- Count 6 - Compelled Speech: Stated that Section 9 compelled Utah based content providers to label their speech as "adult content" in violation of the First Amendment.
- Count 7 - Violation of the Commerce Clause of the United States Constitution: Stated that the Act violated the interstate commerce provision of the Commerce Clause, as it subjected ISPs to "inconsistent regulations" that impacted out of state users.

Under their prayer for relief, plaintiffs sought a preliminary as well as permanent injunction against the State from enforcing the enumerated provisions, due to their constitutional violations, and the fact that under strict scrutiny the infringement of plaintiffs' First and Fourteenth Amendment rights were not justified by a compelling government purpose.

== State's Response ==
The State of Utah, in response, argued that the law was vital to apprehend sexual predators, citing the use of Internet chatrooms and other websites. It stated that the law was designed to aid its longstanding Internet Crimes Against Children taskforce. It also stated that since the law applied in large part to ISPs, bookstores and individuals did not have standing to challenge the law. The State sought to differentiate HB 260 from the law at issue in Reno v. ACLU, arguing that this law was narrower, as it explicitly identified "harmful websites" through the tagging system in the adult content registry. This process, according to the State, was designed to facilitate ISPs in their blocking and filtering processes, by giving them a defined field.

Defendants stated that the requirement for ISPs to provide their customers with filtering mechanisms for "pornographic materials" was the most effective means of preventing minors from accessing pornography on the internet. Utah further argued that the filtering requirement ensured that the law was narrowly tailored in order to achieve a "compelling government interest."

The State cited cases such as Sable Communications of California v. FCC and Ginsberg v. New York to argue that the law would withstand strict scrutiny, as states had a compelling interest in "protecting the physical and psychological well-being of minors" and were therefore permitted to "regulate material that is indecent with respect to minors."

== Declaratory Judgment ==
Judge Dee Benson issued an order and declaratory judgment on May 15, 2012. The judge held that individuals and organizations could not be prosecuted under Section 1206 for posting constitutionally protected content on general access websites, and that they were not subject to criminal and civil penalties under Section 1233 for a failure to label, or restrict access to their material. Around this time, Plaintiffs worked with Utah Attorney General Mark Shurtleff on the implementation and enforcement of the law.

== Impact ==
The case was hailed as a "crucial victory for free speech," by the Media Coalition, while the ACLU stated that this order "...removes the cloud cast over internet speech that Utah's broadly worded statute had created," and the Center for Democracy and Technology stated that the judgment brought "...Utah law into line with 15 years of legal precedent protecting the constitutional rights of adults to access lawful content online."

== See also ==
- Children's Internet Protection Act
- Nitke v. Gonzales
- Dart v. Craigslist, Inc.
- United States v. American Library Association
- Media Coverage of Other State Filtering Laws
