= List of United States Supreme Court cases, volume 357 =

This is a list of all the United States Supreme Court cases from volume 357 of the United States Reports:

Case name	Citation	Date decided
NLRB v. Duval Jewelry Co.	357 U.S. 1	1958
Lewis v. NLRB	357 U.S. 10	1958
United States v. Dow	357 U.S. 17	1958
Colony, Inc. v. Commissioner	357 U.S. 28	1958
Commissioner v. Stern	357 U.S. 39	1958
United States v. Bess	357 U.S. 51	1958
Flora v. United States	357 U.S. 63	1958
Chicago v. Atchison, T. & S.F.R.R. Co.	357 U.S. 77	1958
Carpenters v. NLRB	357 U.S. 93	1958
Kent v. Dulles	357 U.S. 116	1958
Dayton v. Dulles	357 U.S. 144	1958
United States v. Central Eureka Mining Co.	357 U.S. 155	1958
Leng May Ma v. Barber	357 U.S. 185	1958
Rogers v. Quan	357 U.S. 193	1958
Societe Internationale pour Participations Industrielles et Commerciales, S. A. v. Rogers	357 U.S. 197	1958
Eskridge v. Washington Bd. of Prison Terms	357 U.S. 214	1958
Triplett v. Iowa	357 U.S. 217	1958
DeFebio v. School Bd. of Fairfax Cty.	357 U.S. 218	1958
Cash v. United States	357 U.S. 219	1958
Rogers v. Richmond	357 U.S. 220	1958
McAllister v. Magnolia Petroleum Co.	357 U.S. 221	1958
Hanson v. Denckla	357 U.S. 235	1958
McKinney v. Missouri-Kansas-Texas R.R. Co.	357 U.S. 265	1958
Ivanhoe Irr. Dist. v. McCracken	357 U.S. 275	1958
Miller v. United States	357 U.S. 301	1958
City of Tacoma v. Taxpayers of Tacoma	357 U.S. 320	1958
Morand v. Raleigh	357 U.S. 343	1958
Dunn v. Los Angeles Cnty.	357 U.S. 344	1958
NLRB v. Milk Drivers	357 U.S. 345	1958
Klaw v. Schaffer	357 U.S. 346	1958
Glanzman v. Schaffer	357 U.S. 347	1958
Washington v. United States (1958)	357 U.S. 348	1958
Wiener v. United States	357 U.S. 349	1958
NLRB v. Steelworkers	357 U.S. 357	1958
Knapp v. Schweitzer	357 U.S. 371	1958
Gore v. United States	357 U.S. 386	1958
Beilan v. School Dist. of Philadelphia	357 U.S. 399	1958
Ashdown v. Utah	357 U.S. 426	1958
Crooker v. California	357 U.S. 433	1958
NAACP v. Alabama ex rel. Patterson	357 U.S. 449	1958
Lerner v. Casey	357 U.S. 468	1958
Giordenello v. United States	357 U.S. 480	1958
Jones v. United States (1958)	357 U.S. 493	1958
Cicenia v. Lagay	357 U.S. 504	1958
Speiser v. Randall	357 U.S. 513	1958
First Unitarian Church, Los Angeles	357 U.S. 545	1958
Caritativo v. California	357 U.S. 549	1958
FTC v. National Casualty Co.	357 U.S. 560	1958
Aaron v. Cooper	357 U.S. 566	1958
First Methodist Church v. Horstmann	357 U.S. 568	1958
CBS v. Atkinson	357 U.S. 569	1958
Pennsylvania v. City Trusts of Philadelphia	357 U.S. 570	1958
National Biscuit Co. v. Pennsylvania	357 U.S. 571	1958
Primbs v. California	357 U.S. 572	1958
Joines v. United States	357 U.S. 573	1958
Indiviglio v. United States	357 U.S. 574	1958
Ross v. Schneckloth	357 U.S. 575	1958
Giordenello v. United States	357 U.S. 576	1958
Urrutia v. United States	357 U.S. 577	1958
Hansford v. United States	357 U.S. 578	1958
