= Carroll v. Town of Princess Anne =

- Supreme Court of the United States

Argued October 21, 1968 Decided November 19, 1968
- Full case name: Joseph Carroll, et al. v. President and Commissioners of Princess Anne
- Citations: 393 U.S. 175 (more) 89 S. Ct. 347; 21 L. Ed. 2d 325

Holding
- Generally, a state cannot preemptively prohibit persons from holding a public meeting without first notifying them and giving them an opportunity to challenge the decision.

Court membership
- Chief Justice Earl Warren Associate Justices Hugo Black · William O. Douglas; John M. Harlan II · William J. Brennan Jr. Potter Stewart · Byron White; Abe Fortas · Thurgood Marshall

Case opinions
- Majority: Fortas, joined by Warren, Douglas, Brennan, Harlan, Stewart, White, Marshall
- Concurrence: Black

Laws applied
- U.S. Const. amend. I, XIV

Carroll v. Town of Princess Anne, 393 U.S. 175 (1968), was a United States Supreme Court case in which the Court held that a state cannot preemptively prohibit persons from holding a public meeting, without first notifying the persons involved, and providing the persons an opportunity to argue the decision, unless the moving party can show (1) that they made efforts to give notice, and (2) explain the reasons why such notice should not be required.

== Background ==
A white supremacist group, the National States' Rights Party, held a rally in Princess Anne, Maryland, on August 6, 1966. They intended to hold another public meeting the following day, but local citizens persuaded a Circuit Court judge to issue a 10-day restraining order, prohibiting the group from holding any rally "which will tend to disturb and endanger the citizens of the County". The Party was not given any advance notice of the restraining order, nor given an opportunity to argue against it. The Circuit Court then issued a 10-month restraining order. The Maryland court of appeals overturned the 10 month order but upheld the 10-day order. The Party appealed to the Supreme Court.

== Opinion of the Court ==
The Supreme Court held that the 14th Amendment's guarantee of due process required the state to provide the group with notice and a hearing before a restraining order could be issued. Justice Black concurred in the judgment.

The 10-day restraining order was set aside.
