= Clapper v. Amnesty International USA =

Clapper v. Amnesty International
- Supreme Court of the United States

Argued October 29, 2012 Decided February 26, 2013
- Full case name: James R. Clapper, Jr., Director of National Intelligence, et al., Petitioners v. Amnesty International USA, et al.
- Docket no.: 11-1025
- Citations: 568 U.S. 398 (more) 133 S. Ct. 1138; 185 L. Ed. 2d 264; 2013 U.S. LEXIS 1858; 2013 ILRC 1311; 41 Med. L. Rptr. 1357; 81 U.S.L.W. 4121

Case history
- Prior: defendant motion for summary judgment granted sub nom. Amnesty International v. McConnell, 646 F. Supp. 2d 633 (S.D.N.Y. 2009); reversed, 638 F.3d 118 (2nd Cir. 2011); rehearing en banc denied, 667 F.3d 163 (2011); certiorari granted, 566 U.S. ___ (2012)

Holding
- Respondents' claims that they were likely to be targets of surveillance were based too much on speculation and on a predicted chain of events that might never occur, so they lacked Article III standing to challenge FISA Amendments Act of 2008.

Court membership
- Chief Justice John Roberts Associate Justices Antonin Scalia · Anthony Kennedy; Clarence Thomas · Ruth Bader Ginsburg; Stephen Breyer · Samuel Alito; Sonia Sotomayor · Elena Kagan

Case opinions
- Majority: Alito, joined by Roberts, Scalia, Kennedy, Thomas
- Dissent: Breyer, joined by Ginsburg, Sotomayor, Kagan

Laws applied
- U.S. Const. art. III; Foreign Intelligence Surveillance Act

Clapper v. Amnesty International USA, 568 U.S. 398 (2013), was a United States Supreme Court case in which the Court held that Amnesty International USA and others lacked standing to challenge section 702 of the Foreign Intelligence Surveillance Act of 1978 (50 U.S.C. § 1881a), as amended by the Foreign Intelligence Surveillance Act of 1978 Amendments Act of 2008.

== Background ==
Clapper was a challenge to the FISA Amendments Act of 2008, which empowers the Foreign Intelligence Surveillance Court to authorize surveillance without a showing of probable cause that the target of the surveillance is an agent of a foreign power. The government must demonstrate only that the surveillance targets “persons reasonably believed to be located outside the United States” and seeks “foreign intelligence information.” The plaintiffs alleged that they sustained greater inconvenience and higher costs because of the need to conduct secure communications with parties overseas whom the US government had probably targeted for surveillance. The challenge was brought against James Clapper, Director of National Intelligence.

== Decision ==
The Court ruled that the respondents did not have standing. To establish standing an injury must specific legal requirements, including a requirement that the injury is imminent. In this stituation the Court agreed with the US government's argument that "the claims of the challengers that they were likely to be targets of surveillance were based too much on speculation and on a predicted chain of events that might never occur, so they could not satisfy the constitutional requirement for being allowed to sue." "Respondents cannot manufacture standing merely by inflicting harm on themselves based on their fears of hypothetical future harm that is not certainly impending," Justice Samuel Alito wrote in the majority opinion.

Justice Breyer, in dissent, said that the case should have proceeded to trial. Of the surveillance, he wrote: “Indeed it is as likely to take place as are most future events that commonsense inference and ordinary knowledge of human nature tell us will happen.”

== Reactions ==
According to Jameel Jaffer, deputy legal director of the American Civil Liberties Union (ACLU), which argued the case on behalf of the plaintiffs before the Supreme Court, the challenged amendments made in 2008 to the Foreign Intelligence Surveillance Act essentially allow the National Security Agency (NSA) "to engage in dragnet surveillance of Americans’ international communications," even of those "who might not be suspected at all of having done anything wrong" and so "it's a very broad surveillance statute" and "arguably broader than any surveillance statute that Congress has sanctioned in the past." According to him, the Supreme Court, by requiring the plaintiffs to show that they have been monitored under the law, has essentially created a barrier to judicial review by preventing anyone from ever challenging that kind of statute in court as indeed, nobody can show that they have been monitored under the law since the government does not disclose its targets.

After the decision in favor of the government, several legal experts stated, "Clapper also hints at a rocky reception for the challenge to the NDAA in Hedges."

== Aftermath ==
Before the process, Solicitor General Donald B. Verrilli Jr. had denied that ruling in the US government's favor would immunize the surveillance program from constitutional challenges. “That contention is misplaced,” Verrilli wrote in a brief. “Others may be able to establish standing even if respondents cannot. As respondents recognize, the government must provide advance notice of its intent to use information obtained or derived from” the surveillance authorized by the 2008 law “against a person in judicial or administrative proceedings and that person may challenge the underlying surveillance.” Specifically, Verrilli unequivocally assured the Supreme Court in its brief, that criminal defendants would receive notice of FAA surveillance and an opportunity to challenge the statute:

If the government intends to use or disclose any information obtained or derived from its acquisition of a person's communications under [the FAA] in judicial or administrative proceedings against that person, it must provide advance notice of its intent to the tribunal and the person, whether or not the person was targeted for surveillance under [the FAA].

The USCC then took Verrilli's assurance and ruled in accordance with the FAA §1881a according to which criminal defendants who are prosecuted using evidence obtained or derived from FAA surveillance are entitled to notice:

If the Government intends to use or disclose information obtained or derived from a §1881a acquisition in judicial or administrative proceedings, it must provide advance notice of its intent, and the affected person may challenge the lawfulness of the acquisition.

Despite this federal prosecutors have refused to make the promised disclosures. In a prosecution in Federal District Court in Fort Lauderdale, Florida, against two brothers accused of plotting to bomb targets in New York, the government has said that it plans to use information gathered under the Foreign Intelligence Surveillance Act of 1978, which authorizes individual warrants. However, prosecutors have refused to say whether the government obtained those individual warrants based on information derived from the 2008 law, which allows programmatic surveillance. Prosecutors in Chicago have taken the same approach in a prosecution of teenager accused of plotting to blow up a bar.

While both the original Foreign Intelligence Surveillance Act and the FISA Amendments Act require the government to notify defendants when evidence being used against them is derived from surveillance authorized by the corresponding law, there is a crucial difference between both laws with respect to warrants. A traditional FISA court order pursuant to the original Act requires the government to go to a FISA judge and show probable cause that the target is an agent of a foreign power. The expanded surveillance program authorized in 2008 allows the FAA, however, targets non-Americans persons “reasonably believed” to be located outside the United States, and it does not require that the government to obtain individual warrants before it intercepts communications. Moreover, the purpose of the collection is “foreign intelligence,” a broad category that may include everything from information on terrorism to nuclear proliferation to European journalist writing on human rights abuses or an African businessman talking about global financial risk. In essence, the law authorized the government to wiretap Americans’ e-mails and phone calls without an individual court order and on domestic soil if the surveillance is “targeted” at a foreigner abroad. Judge John O'Sullivan explained it this way in the Florida case:

Before passage of the FAA in 2008, FISA generally foreclosed the government from engaging in "electronic surveillance" without first obtaining an individualized and particularized order from the Foreign Intelligence Surveillance Court ("FISC"). To obtain an order from the FISC, the government had to satisfy certain requirements including that a "significant purpose" of the surveillance was to obtain "foreign intelligence information. 50 U.S.C. § 1805(a)(2)(B).
When FISA was amended in 2008, the FAA provided legislative authority for the warrantless surveillance of U.S. citizens' and residents' communications. Although the FAA left FISA intact regarding communications known to be purely domestic, the FAA expanded FISA by allowing the mass acquisition of U.S. citizens' and residents' international communications without individualized judicial oversight or supervision. See Clapper v. Amnesty Intl USA, 133 S. Ct. 1138, 1143-44 (2013). Under the FAA, the Attorney General and Director of National Intelligence ("DNI") may "authorize jointly, for a period of up to one year... the targeting of persons reasonably believed to be located outside the United States to acquire foreign intelligence information." 50 U.S.C. § 1881(a).

Verrilli had told the Supreme Court justices that somebody would have legal standing to trigger review of the program because prosecutors would notify people facing evidence derived from surveillance under the 2008 FISA Amendments law. However, it turned out that Verrilli's assurances clashed with the actual practices of national security prosecutors, who had not been alerting such defendants that evidence in their cases had stemmed from wiretapping their conversations without a warrant. For Verrilli, that led to the question of whether any persuasive legal basis exists for failing to clearly notify defendants that they faced evidence linked to the 2008 warrantless surveillance law, which prevented them from knowing that they had an opportunity to argue that it derived from an unconstitutional search. After internal deliberations in which Verrilli argued that there was no legal basis to conceal from defendants that evidence derived from legally-untested surveillance, which prevented them from knowing that they had an opportunity to challenge it, the US Justice Department concluded “that withholding disclosure from defendants could not be justified legally.” As a consequence, the Justice Department, as of October 2013, was setting up a potential Supreme Court test of whether it is constitutional by notifying criminal defendants for the first time that evidence against them had been derived from eavesdropping that had been authorized under the FISA Amendments Act of 2008. The first defendant who received notice that he had been monitored under the FISA Amendments Act of 2008 (FAA) was Jamshid Muhtorov on October 25, 2013. According to the New York Times, the move is expected to set up a Supreme Court test of whether eavesdropping from a warrantless wiretap is constitutional.

The American Civil Liberties Union praised Verrilli for providing criminal defendants who are prosecuted using evidence obtained or derived from FAA surveillance and are entitled to notice that this evidence was acquired under the FISA Amendments Act with such statutorily-required notice that is required under the FISA Amendments Act. That gives defendants the opportunity to move to suppress FAA-derived evidence and to right to challenge the warrantless wiretapping law and trial courts the opportunity to adjudicate the FAA's constitutionality. Despite its praise, the ACLU urged Verrilli "should now submit a letter-brief alerting the [Supreme] Court to the significant factual error in the government's submissions. His letter should explain what the NSD's [National Security Division of the U.S. Justice Department] notice policy was when Clapper was before the courts; on what basis the NSD came to the conclusion that the policy was justified; how it came to pass that the government misrepresented the NSD's policy; and what the NSD's notice policy is now."

== See also ==
- Litigation over global surveillance
- ACLU v. Clapper
- Amnesty v. Blair
- Laird v. Tatum
- COINTELPRO
- PRISM (surveillance program)
