= American Civil Liberties Union v. Schundler =

United States federal court case

American Civil Liberties Union of New Jersey v. Schundler
- Court: United States Court of Appeals for the Third Circuit
- Full case name: The American Civil Liberties Union of New Jersey, on behalf of its members, Robert Lander, Adam Jacobs, Joel Solow and Ann Sorrel v. Bret Schundler, in his official capacity as Mayor of the City of Jersey City, New Jersey; The City Council of Jersey City, New Jersey; City of Jersey City, New Jersey
- Argued: August 6, 1998
- Decided: February 16, 1999
- Citation: 168 F.3d 92

Case history
- Prior history: Injunction granted, 931 F. Supp. 1180 (D.N.J. 1995); affirmed, 104 F.3d 1435 (1997).
- Subsequent history: Cert. denied, 520 U.S. 1265 (June 9, 1997)

Court membership
- Judges sitting: Richard Lowell Nygaard, Samuel Alito, Marjorie O. Rendell

Case opinions
- Majority: Alito, joined by Rendell
- Dissent: Nygaard

Laws applied
- U.S. Const. amend. I

American Civil Liberties Union of New Jersey v. Schundler, 168 F.3d 92 (3rd Cir. 1999), is a United States federal case establishing standards for a government-sponsored holiday display to contain religious symbols. It was decided by the Court of Appeals for the Third Circuit on February 16, 1999.

== Background ==
During the holiday season, Jersey City, New Jersey erected a nativity scene, a Christmas tree and a menorah on city property in front of City Hall. The scene included Mary, Joseph, Baby Jesus and the Three Wisemen. The American Civil Liberties Union (ACLU) asked the city to stop putting religious symbols on public property. Jersey City put up a sign next to the display that read "Through this display and others throughout the year, the City of Jersey City is pleased to celebrate the diverse cultural and ethnic heritages of its peoples." The ACLU filed a lawsuit saying that this display was unconstitutional because it violated the Establishment Clause of the First Amendment. The Federal District Court of New Jersey ordered the city to stop erecting its holiday display. The City decided to appeal this ruling. The City also erected a modified holiday display with the original menorah, Christmas tree and nativity and the City added a Santa Claus, Frosty the Snowman, a sled, Kwanzaa symbols on the tree and two signs. The ACLU filed for contempt. After some back and forth with the Third Circuit Court of Appeals, the District Court ruled that the modified display did not violate the First Amendment.

== Decision ==
The majority opinion of the court was written by Circuit Judge Samuel Alito. The Court used the test for the Establishment Clause from Lemon v. Kurtzman. This test looks at "whether a challenged government practice had a secular purpose, whether its principal or primary effect advanced or inhibited religion, and whether it created an excessive entanglement of the government with religion." The Court also relied on two prior Supreme Court cases Lynch v. Donnelly and County of Allegheny v. ACLU. The Court stated that "we are unable to perceive any meaningful constitutional distinction between the display at issue here and those that the Supreme Court upheld in Lynch and Allegheny County." "None of these displays conveyed a message of government endorsement of Christianity, Judaism, or of religion in general but instead 'sent a message of pluralism and freedom to choose one's own beliefs." The Court decided that the modified display did not violate the First Amendment.
