= Escobedo v. Illinois =

- Supreme Court of the United States

Argued April 29, 1964 Decided June 22, 1964
- Full case name: Escobedo v. Illinois
- Citations: 378 U.S. 478 (more) 84 S. Ct. 1758; 12 L. Ed. 2d 977; 1964 U.S. LEXIS 827; 4 Ohio Misc. 197; 32 Ohio Op. 2d 31

Case history
- Prior: Defendant convicted in Cook County criminal court; Illinois Supreme Court held statement inadmissible and reversed, February 1, 1963; on petition for rehearing, Illinois Supreme Court affirmed conviction, 28 Ill. 2d 41; cert. granted, 375 U.S. 902.
- Subsequent: reversed and remanded

Holding
- If a police investigation begins to focus on a particular suspect, his statements to the police are excluded if he has been refused counsel.

Court membership
- Chief Justice Earl Warren Associate Justices Hugo Black · William O. Douglas; Tom C. Clark · John M. Harlan II; William J. Brennan Jr. · Potter Stewart; Byron White · Arthur Goldberg

Case opinions
- Majority: Goldberg, joined by Warren, Black, Douglas, Brennan
- Dissent: Harlan
- Dissent: Stewart
- Dissent: White, joined by Clark, Stewart

Laws applied
- U.S. Const. amends. VI, XIV

Escobedo v. Illinois, 378 U.S. 478 (1964), is a United States Supreme Court case holding that criminal suspects have a right to counsel during police interrogations under the Sixth Amendment. The case was decided a year after the court had held in Gideon v. Wainwright that indigent criminal defendants have a right to be provided counsel at trial.

== Background ==
Danny Escobedo's brother-in-law, Manuel Valtierra, was shot and killed on the night of January 19, 1960. Escobedo was arrested without a warrant early the next morning and interrogated. However, Escobedo made no statement to the police and was released that afternoon.

Benedict DiGerlando, who was in custody and considered to be another suspect, later told the police that Escobedo had indeed fired the fatal shots because the victim had mistreated Escobedo's sister. On January 30, the police again arrested Escobedo and his sister, Grace. While transporting them to the police station, the police explained that DiGerlando had implicated Escobedo and urged him and Grace to confess. Escobedo again declined, and he asked to speak to his attorney, but the police refused by explaining that although he was not formally charged yet, he was in custody and could not leave. His attorney went to the police station and repeatedly asked to see his client but was repeatedly refused access.

Police and prosecutors proceeded to interrogate Escobedo for fourteen-and-a-half hours and repeatedly refused his request to speak with his attorney. While being interrogated, Escobedo made statements indicating his knowledge of the crime. After conviction for murder, Escobedo appealed on the basis of being denied the right to counsel.

== Decision ==
Escobedo appealed to the Illinois Supreme Court, which initially held the confession inadmissible and reversed the conviction. Illinois petitioned for rehearing, and the court then affirmed the conviction. Escobedo appealed to the US Supreme Court, which overturned the conviction in a 5–4 decision. The majority opinion was written by Justice Arthur Goldberg. The ACLU had argued before the Court as amicus curiae in favor of Escobedo.

== Later developments ==
This holding was later implicitly overruled by Miranda v. Arizona in 1966, where the Supreme Court held that pre-indictment interrogations violate the Fifth Amendment, not the Sixth Amendment. As Escobedo was questioned during a custodial interrogation, the result for him would have been the same.

In the years following the decision, Escobedo received 12 felony convictions, including federal charges of selling drugs. He was also convicted of taking indecent liberties with children. While free on an appeal bond with respect to those charges, Escobedo pleaded guilty to attempted murder and was sentenced to 11 years in prison.

== See also ==
- List of United States Supreme Court cases, volume 378
- Gideon v. Wainwright
- R. v. Brydges
