= Judge Munger =

Judge Munger may refer to:

- Thomas Charles Munger (1861–1941), judge of the United States District Court for the District of Nebraska
- William Henry Munger (1845–1915), judge of the United States District Court for the District of Nebraska
