= Urbom =

Urbom is a surname. Notable people with the surname include:

- Alexander Urbom (born 1990), Swedish ice hockey player
- Warren Keith Urbom (1925–2017), American politician
