= Unsuccessful recess appointments to United States federal courts =

In the history of the United States, there have been approximately 32 unsuccessful recess appointments to United States federal courts. 22 individuals have been appointed to a United States federal court through a recess appointment who were thereafter rejected by the United States Senate when their name was formally submitted in nomination, either by a vote rejecting the nominee, or by the failure of the Senate to act on the nomination. These individuals served as federal judges, having full authority to hold office and issue rulings, until their rejection by the Senate. Five individuals were appointed but resigned either before the Senate voted on their nomination, or before a formal nomination was even submitted. Another five individuals were appointed but never assumed the office.

== Constitutional background ==
Article II, Section 2, Clause 3 of the United States Constitution states:

The President shall have Power to fill up all Vacancies that may happen during the Recess of the Senate, by granting Commissions which shall expire at the End of their next Session.

The president may fill critical federal executive and judicial branch vacancies unilaterally but temporarily when the Senate is in recess, and thus unavailable to provide advice and consent. Such appointments expire at the end of the next Senate session. To continue to serve thereafter, the appointee must be formally nominated by the president and confirmed by the Senate.

== History of use ==
John Rutledge, appointed by George Washington was the first recess appointment to be rejected by the Senate, and the only recess appointee to the Supreme Court of the United States to be rejected. Washington appointed Rutledge on July 1, 1795, but because of Rutledge's political views and occasional mental illness, the Senate rejected his nomination December 15, 1795. Rutledge subsequently attempted suicide, and then resigned on December 28, 1795. The 4th United States Congress remained in session until June 1, 1796, so Rutledge could have remained on the Court until then, but chose not to.

Wallace McCamant, appointed by Calvin Coolidge on May 25, 1925, to the United States Court of Appeals for the Ninth Circuit, was the lone recess appointment to a United States Court of Appeals to be rejected by the Senate. The Senate rejected his nomination on March 17, 1926, and he resigned on May 2, 1926.

In total, fourteen presidents have had recess appointments rejected. William Howard Taft - who only made six recess appointments to the federal bench - experienced the largest number of rejected recess appointments, with three. Harry S. Truman - who made a record 38 such appointments - also had three recess appointments rejected, but one of those was later reappointed and confirmed. Taft had also used recess appointments to reappoint two judges whose recess appointments by Theodore Roosevelt had been rejected; both appointees resigned from their positions before their names were formally submitted into nomination.

== Unsuccessful U.S. district court recess appointments ==
Recess appointees to the United States district courts not subsequently confirmed by the Senate are as follows:

Judge	Court	Appointing President	Began active service	Ended active service	Notes
John Moses Cheney	S.D. Fla.	Taft	August 26, 1912	March 3, 1913	Congress adjourned without acting on the nomination.
William Creighton Jr.	D. Ohio	J. Q. Adams	November 1, 1828	February 16, 1829	Congress adjourned without acting on the nomination.
Hamilton G. Ewart	W.D.N.C.	McKinley	July 16, 1898; April 14, 1899	March 4, 1899; June 7, 1900	Received consecutive recess appointments to the same court; on both occasions, Congress adjourned without acting on the nomination.
John Feikens	E.D. Mich.	Eisenhower	October 13, 1960	September 27, 1961	Congress adjourned without acting on the nomination. Renominated to the same court by John F. Kennedy, but the nomination was withdrawn; again renominated by Richard Nixon, on October 7, 1970, to a different seat on the same court, and confirmed by the United States Senate on November 25, 1970, receiving his commission on December 1, 1970; took senior status on March 1, 1986.
Monroe Mark Friedman	N.D. Cal.	Truman	July 17, 1952	July 24, 1953	Nomination withdrawn prior to Senate action.
Roy Winfield Harper	W.D. Mo.	Truman	August 7, 1947; December 20, 1947	December 19, 1947; June 22, 1948	Received three consecutive recess appointments to the same court; on the first two occasions, Congress adjourned without acting on the nomination, but confirmed the third recess appointment; thereafter served as an active judge until January 5, 1971, and in senior status until his death on February 13, 1994.
Walter Heen	D. Haw.	Carter	January 1, 1981	December 16, 1981	Nomination withdrawn (by President Reagan) prior to Senate action.
J. Smith Henley	E.D. Ark.	Eisenhower	October 25, 1958	September 11, 1959	On August 18, 1959, before the recess appointment expired, Eisenhower re-nominated Henley to a different seat on the Eastern and Western District of Arkansas; confirmed by the Senate on September 2, 1959, and received his commission on September 8, 1959 - three days before the expiration of his recess appointment; thereafter served on the District Court until March 24, 1975, and was then elevated to the Eighth Circuit.
Clinton Woodbury Howard	W.D. Wash.	Taft	August 26, 1912	March 3, 1913	Congress adjourned without acting on the nomination.
Oscar Richard Hundley	D. Ala.	T. Roosevelt	April 9, 1907; May 30, 1908	May 30, 1908; March 3, 1909	Received three consecutive recess appointments to the same court, two from Roosevelt and the third from William Howard Taft; on the first two occasions, Congress adjourned without acting on the nomination; resigned after the third recess appointment, with his name not having formally been put into nomination.
George E. Q. Johnson	N.D. Ill.	Hoover	August 3, 1932	March 3, 1933	Formally rejected by the Senate.
William Douglas McHugh	D. Neb.	Cleveland	November 20, 1896	February 1, 1897	Nomination withdrawn prior to Senate action.
Philip C. Pendleton	W.D. Va.	J. Q. Adams	May 6, 1825	July 29, 1825	Resigned before he was formally nominated to the office, and was therefore never considered by the United States Senate.
Charles W. Pickering	Fifth Circuit	G. W. Bush	January 16, 2004	December 8, 2004	Formally nominated on January 7, 2003, but resigned prior to action by Congress on the nomination.
Milton D. Purdy	D. Minn.	T. Roosevelt	July 6, 1908	March 3, 1909	Congress adjourned without acting on the nomination; received a second recess appointment to the same seat from President William Howard Taft on March 6, 1909, but resigned on May 1, 1909, with his name not having formally been put into nomination.
David Rabinovitz	W.D. Wis.	L. B. Johnson	January 7, 1964	October 3, 1964	Congress adjourned without acting on the nomination.
Floyd H. Roberts	W.D. Va.	F. Roosevelt	July 6, 1938	February 6, 1939	Formally rejected by the Senate.
Richard Elihu Sloan	D. Ariz.	Taft	December 3, 1912	March 3, 1913	Congress adjourned without acting on the nomination.
Carroll O. Switzer	S.D. Iowa	Truman	October 21, 1949	August 9, 1950	Formally rejected by the Senate.
Benjamin Tappan	D. Ohio	Jackson	October 12, 1833	May 29, 1834	Formally rejected by the Senate.
William Josiah Tilson	M.D. Ga.	Coolidge	June 6, 1926	March 4, 1927	Received a second recess appointment to a different seat on the same court on March 5, 1927, but resigned on March 19, 1928, with his name not having formally been put into nomination.
Joel C. C. Winch	E.D. Tex.	Grant	October 11, 1870	March 3, 1871	Congress adjourned without acting on the nomination.
