= Judge McHugh =

Judge McHugh may refer to:

- Carolyn B. McHugh (born 1957), judge of the United States Court of Appeals for the Tenth Circuit
- Gerald A. McHugh Jr. (born 1954), judge of the United States District Court for the Eastern District of Pennsylvania
- William Douglas McHugh (1859–1923), judge of the United States District Court for the District of Nebraska

== See also ==
- Justice McHugh (disambiguation)
