= Albert Gerard Schatz =

American judge (1921–1985)

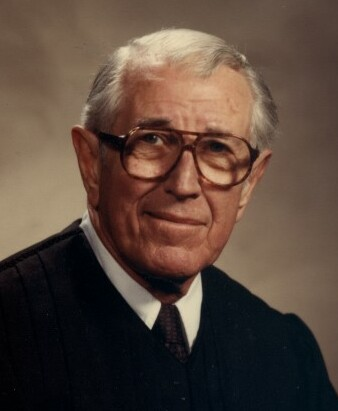

Judge of the United States District Court for the District of Nebraska
- In office May 11, 1973 – April 30, 1985
- Appointed by: Richard Nixon
- Preceded by: Richard A. Dier
- Succeeded by: Lyle Elmer Strom

Personal details
- Born: Albert Gerard Schatz; August 4, 1921 Omaha, Nebraska
- Died: April 30, 1985 (aged 63)
- Education: University of Nebraska (A.B.); Creighton University School of Law (LL.B.)

Albert Gerard Schatz (August 4, 1921 – April 30, 1985) was a United States district judge of the United States District Court for the District of Nebraska.

== Education and career ==
Born in Omaha, Nebraska, Schatz received an Artium Baccalaureus degree from the University of Nebraska in 1943 and was a United States Marine Corps Captain from 1943 to 1946. He then received a Bachelor of Laws from Creighton University School of Law in 1948. He was a law clerk to Judge Joseph William Woodrough of the United States Court of Appeals for the Eighth Circuit from 1948 to 1950. Schatz was then in private practice in Omaha from 1950 to 1973.

== Federal judicial service ==
On April 12, 1973, Schatz was nominated by President Richard Nixon to a seat on the United States District Court for the District of Nebraska vacated by Judge Richard A. Dier. Schatz was confirmed by the United States Senate on May 10, 1973, and received his commission on May 11, 1973, serving until his death on April 30, 1985.

== Sources ==
Legal offices
Preceded by Richard A. Dier	Judge of the United States District Court for the District of Nebraska; 1973–1985	Succeeded by Lyle Elmer Strom
