= Adrian Joseph Caillouet =

American judge (born 1883)

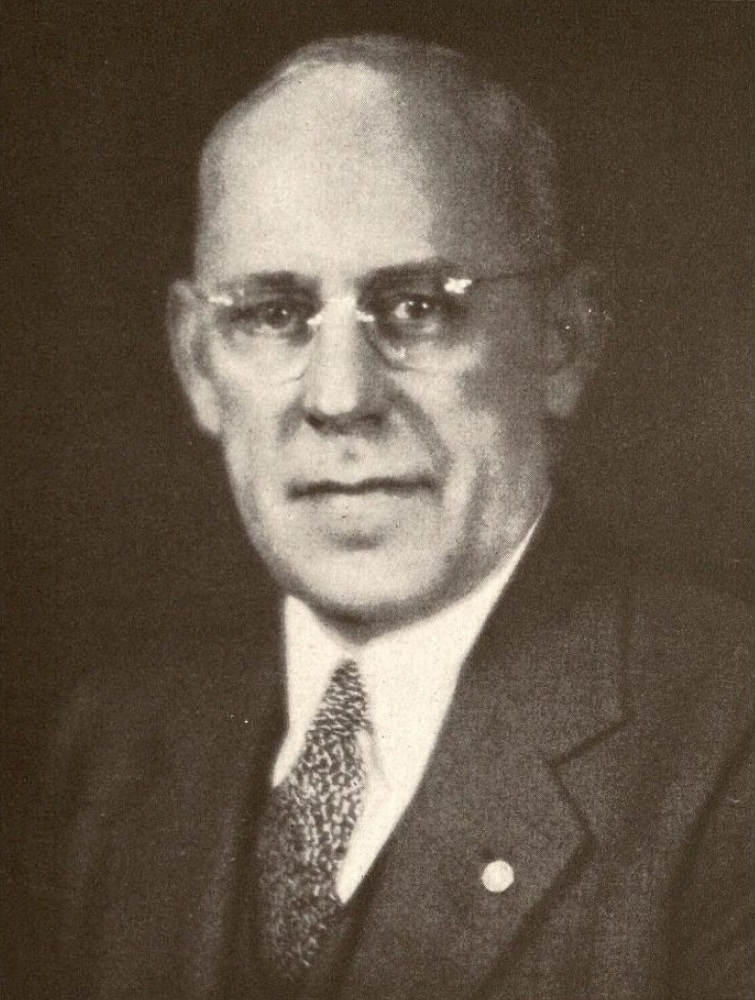

Judge of the United States District Court for the Eastern District of Louisiana
- In office April 23, 1940 – December 19, 1946
- Appointed by: Franklin D. Roosevelt
- Preceded by: Seat established by 52 Stat. 110
- Succeeded by: Herbert William Christenberry

Personal details
- Born: Adrian Joseph Caillouet; February 19, 1883 Thibodaux, Louisiana
- Died: December 19, 1946 (aged 63)
- Education: St. Mary's College (A.B.) read law

Adrian Joseph Caillouet (February 19, 1883 – December 19, 1946) was a United States district judge for the Eastern District of Louisiana. He served on the court during World War II and was recognized as an authority on the Louisiana Civil Code and admiralty and maritime law.

== Early life ==
Caillouet was born in Thibodaux, Louisiana, to Lucien P. Caillouet and Marie Adele Lagarde. His father created Thibodaux's local newspaper, The Sentinel, before being admitted to the Louisiana bar and winning election to the state court.

== Education and career ==
Caillouet studied at St. Mary's College in Lebanon, Kentucky, receiving his undergraduate degree in 1902. He undertook legal training in Thibodaux beginning in 1908 and was admitted to the Louisiana bar in 1913. After practicing in Thibodaux for two years, he relocated to Houma, where he remained in private practice until 1940. By 1921, Caillouet had been awarded an honorary Masters of Arts from his alma mater. In Houma, he became acquainted with neighboring attorney Allen J. Ellender, who later served as a United States Senator from Louisiana.

== Federal judicial service ==
On April 2, 1940, Caillouet was nominated by President Franklin D. Roosevelt to a new seat on the United States District Court for the Eastern District of Louisiana, created by 52 Stat. 110, on the recommendation of Senator Ellender. He was confirmed by the United States Senate on April 9, 1940, and received his commission on April 23, 1940. During World War II, he was one of two judges serving on the court.

Caillouet was an active member of the Maritime Law Association of the United States. A tribute published in the association's journal in March 1947 described him as conscientious and diligent. He died on December 19, 1946, in his chambers in a building now known as the John Minor Wisdom U.S. Court of Appeals Building.

== Personal life ==
Caillouet married Effie Briggs on September 29, 1909. The couple had four sons. Caillouet was a founder of the Houma Chamber of Commerce and was a member of the Knights of Columbus, the Society of Saint Vincent de Paul, and the Holy Name Society.

Legal offices
Preceded by Seat established by 52 Stat. 110	Judge of the United States District Court for the Eastern District of Louisiana; 1940–1946	Succeeded by Herbert William Christenberry
