= Richard A. Dier =

American judge (1914–1972)

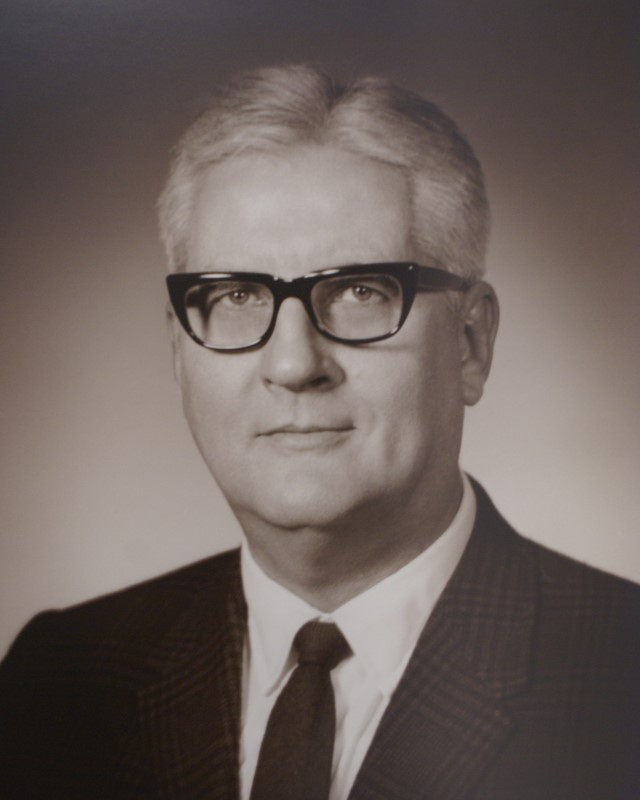

Judge of the United States District Court for the District of Nebraska
- In office December 9, 1971 – December 7, 1972
- Appointed by: Richard Nixon
- Preceded by: Richard Earl Robinson
- Succeeded by: Albert Gerard Schatz

Personal details
- Born: Richard A. Dier; February 27, 1914 Exeter, Nebraska
- Died: December 7, 1972 (aged 58)
- Education: University of Nebraska (B.S., M.A.); Washington University in St. Louis (LL.B.)

Richard Andrew Dier (February 27, 1914 – December 7, 1972) was a United States district judge of the United States District Court for the District of Nebraska.

== Education and career ==
Born in Exeter, Nebraska, Dier received a Bachelor of Science degree from the University of Nebraska in 1935 and a Master of Arts from the University of Nebraska–Lincoln in 1941.

He was in the United States Army during World War II from June 1941 to April 1946. In November 1942, he was stationed at Camp Stoneman in California where he remained until separating from service in December 1945 as a major. He served as assistant director of operations and then as director of personnel until completing his tour at Camp Stoneman. In September 1943, he completed the Command and General Staff School in Leavenworth, Kansas and was promoted to major. Upon completion of the Command and General Staff School, he returned to Camp Stoneman.

After the war, he received a Bachelor of Laws from Washington University School of Law in 1948, and was in private practice in Kearney, Nebraska from 1948 to 1969. He was a city attorney of Kearney from 1949 to 1951. He was a deputy county attorney of Buffalo County, Nebraska from 1954 to 1958. He was the United States Attorney for the District of Nebraska from 1969 to 1972.

== Federal judicial service ==
On December 2, 1971, Dier was nominated by President Richard Nixon to a seat on the United States District Court for the District of Nebraska vacated by Judge Richard Earl Robinson. Dier was confirmed by the United States Senate on December 6, 1971, and received his commission on December 9, 1971. Dier served in that capacity until his death on December 7, 1972. He was buried at Forest Lawn Cemetery in Omaha, Nebraska.

== Sources ==
Legal offices
Preceded by Richard Earl Robinson	Judge of the United States District Court for the District of Nebraska; 1971–1972	Succeeded by Albert Gerard Schatz
