= Thomas Michael Shanahan =

American judge

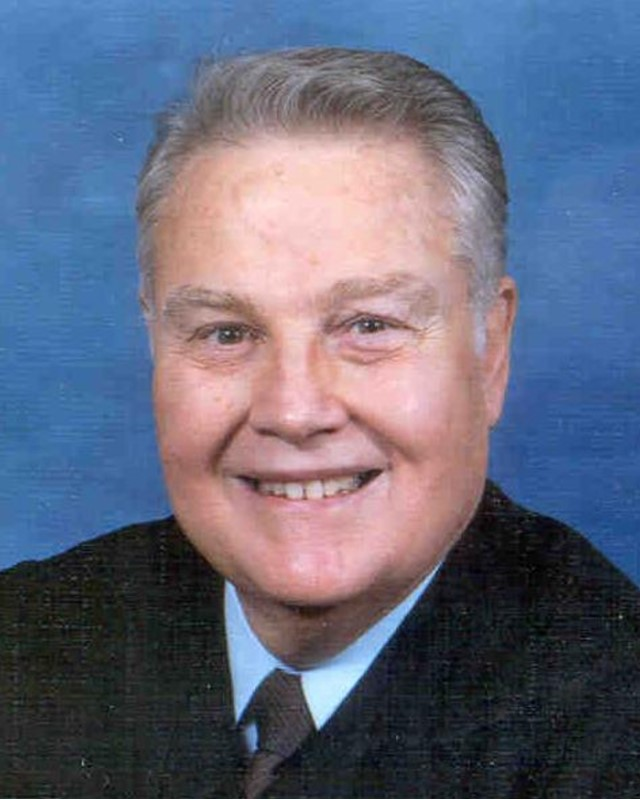

Senior Judge of the United States District Court for the District of Nebraska
- In office May 5, 2004 – December 27, 2011

Judge of the United States District Court for the District of Nebraska
- In office November 22, 1993 – May 5, 2004
- Appointed by: Bill Clinton
- Preceded by: Seat established by 104 Stat. 5089
- Succeeded by: Seat abolished

Justice of the Nebraska Supreme Court
- In office 1983–1993
- Appointed by: Bob Kerrey
- Preceded by: Lawrence M. Clinton
- Succeeded by: John F. Wright

Personal details
- Born: Thomas Michael Shanahan; May 5, 1934 Omaha, Nebraska
- Died: December 27, 2011 (aged 77) Omaha, Nebraska
- Education: University of Notre Dame (B.A.); Georgetown University Law Center (LL.B.)

Thomas Michael Shanahan (May 5, 1934 – December 27, 2011) was a United States district judge of the United States District Court for the District of Nebraska.

== Early life and education ==
Born in Omaha, Nebraska, Shanahan received a Bachelor of Arts degree from the University of Notre Dame in 1956 and a Bachelor of Laws from Georgetown University Law Center in 1959. He was in private practice in Ogallala, Nebraska, from 1959 to 1983.

== Judicial career ==
=== Nebraska Supreme Court ===
Shanahan was a judge on the Nebraska Supreme Court, to which he was appointed March 24, 1983, to fill a vacancy created by the death of Judge Lawrence M. Clinton. Shanahan served in that capacity until 1993.

=== Federal judicial service ===
On August 6, 1993, Shanahan was nominated by President Bill Clinton to a new seat on the United States District Court for the District of Nebraska created by 104 Stat. 5089. He was confirmed by the United States Senate on November 20, 1993, and received his commission on November 22, 1993. He assumed senior status on May 5, 2004, but stopped hearing cases on February 1, 2007. He died on December 27, 2011.

== Sources ==
Legal offices
Preceded by Seat established by 104 Stat. 5089	Judge of the United States District Court for the District of Nebraska; 1993–2004	Succeeded by Seat abolished
