= Richard Earl Robinson =

American judge

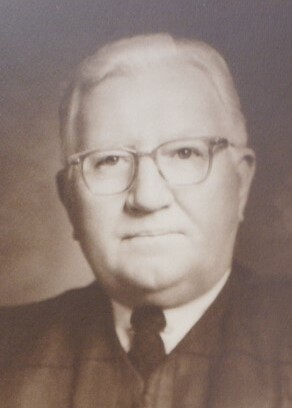

Senior Judge of the United States District Court for the District of Nebraska
- In office January 7, 1972 – January 28, 1991

Chief Judge of the United States District Court for the District of Nebraska
- In office 1957–1972
- Preceded by: John Wayne Delehant
- Succeeded by: Warren Keith Urbom

Judge of the United States District Court for the District of Nebraska
- In office July 3, 1956 – January 7, 1972
- Appointed by: Dwight D. Eisenhower
- Preceded by: James A. Donohoe
- Succeeded by: Richard A. Dier

Personal details
- Born: Richard Earl Robinson; February 3, 1903 Omaha, Nebraska
- Died: January 28, 1991 (aged 87)
- Education: Creighton University School of Law (LL.B.)

Richard Earl Robinson (February 3, 1903 – January 28, 1991) was a United States district judge of the United States District Court for the District of Nebraska.

== Education and career ==
Born in Omaha, Nebraska, Robinson received a Bachelor of Laws from Creighton University School of Law in 1927. He was in private practice in Omaha from 1927 to 1956.

== Federal judicial service ==
On June 21, 1956, Robinson was nominated by President Dwight D. Eisenhower to a seat on the United States District Court for the District of Nebraska vacated by Judge James A. Donohoe. Robinson was confirmed by the United States Senate on July 2, 1956, and received his commission the next day. He served as Chief Judge from 1957 to 1972. He assumed senior status on January 7, 1972. Robinson served in that capacity until his death on January 28, 1991.

== Sources ==
Legal offices
Preceded by James A. Donohoe	Judge of the United States District Court for the District of Nebraska; 1956–1972	Succeeded by Richard A. Dier
Preceded by John Wayne Delehant	Chief Judge of the United States District Court for the District of Nebraska; 1957–1972	Succeeded by Warren Keith Urbom
