= James A. Donohoe =

American judge

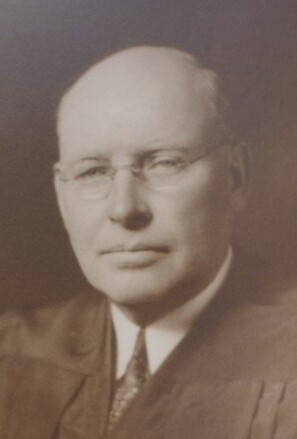

Chief Judge of the United States District Court for the District of Nebraska
- In office 1948–1956
- Preceded by: Office established
- Succeeded by: John Wayne Delehant

Judge of the United States District Court for the District of Nebraska
- In office April 27, 1933 – February 26, 1956
- Appointed by: Franklin D. Roosevelt
- Preceded by: Joseph William Woodrough
- Succeeded by: Richard Earl Robinson

Personal details
- Born: James A. Donohoe; August 9, 1877 O'Neill, Nebraska
- Died: February 26, 1956 (aged 78)
- Education: Midland University (B.S.) read law

James A. Donohoe (August 9, 1877 – February 26, 1956) was a United States district judge of the United States District Court for the District of Nebraska.

== Education and career ==
Born in O'Neill, Nebraska, Donohoe received a Bachelor of Science degree from Freemont Normal College (now Midland University) in Nebraska in 1898 and read law to enter the bar in 1905. He was in private practice in Nebraska from 1905 to 1933. He was a member of the Nebraska Senate (now the sole house of the Nebraska Legislature) from 1908 to 1909.

== Federal judicial service ==
On April 15, 1933, Donohoe was nominated by President Franklin D. Roosevelt to a seat on the United States District Court for the District of Nebraska vacated by Judge Joseph William Woodrough. Donohoe was confirmed by the United States Senate on April 20, 1933, and received his commission on April 27, 1933. He served as Chief Judge from 1948 until his death on February 26, 1956.

== Sources ==
Legal offices
Preceded by Joseph William Woodrough	Judge of the United States District Court for the District of Nebraska; 1933–1956	Succeeded by Richard Earl Robinson
Preceded by Office established	Chief Judge of the United States District Court for the District of Nebraska; 1948–1956	Succeeded by John Wayne Delehant
