= Elmer Scipio Dundy =

American judge (1830–1896)

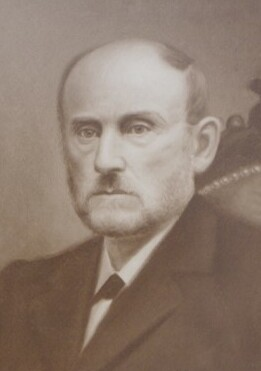

Judge of the United States District Court for the District of Nebraska
- In office April 9, 1868 – October 28, 1896
- Appointed by: Andrew Johnson
- Preceded by: Seat established by 15 Stat. 5
- Succeeded by: William Douglas McHugh

Personal details
- Born: Elmer Scipio Dundy; March 5, 1830 Trumbull County, Ohio
- Died: October 28, 1896 (aged 66) Omaha, Nebraska
- Education: read law

Elmer Scipio Dundy (March 5, 1830 – October 28, 1896) was a United States district judge of the United States District Court for the District of Nebraska. He was the namesake of Dundy County, Nebraska.

== Biography ==
Born on March 5, 1830, in Trumbull County, Ohio, Dundy read law in 1853. He entered private practice in Clearfield, Pennsylvania, and Falls City, Nebraska Territory (unorganized territory until May 30, 1854) from 1853 to 1858. He was a member of the Council of the Territory of Nebraska from 1858 to 1862. In June, 1861 Elmer Dundy married Ohio native Mary H. Robison and they had a son a year later, Elmer Scipio Dundy Jr., followed by 3 daughters: Mary Mae, Luna, and Enid Alva (died at one year of age). He resumed private practice in Falls City from 1862 to 1863. He was a Judge of the United States District Court for the District of Nebraska Territory from 1863 to 1868.

=== Federal judicial service ===
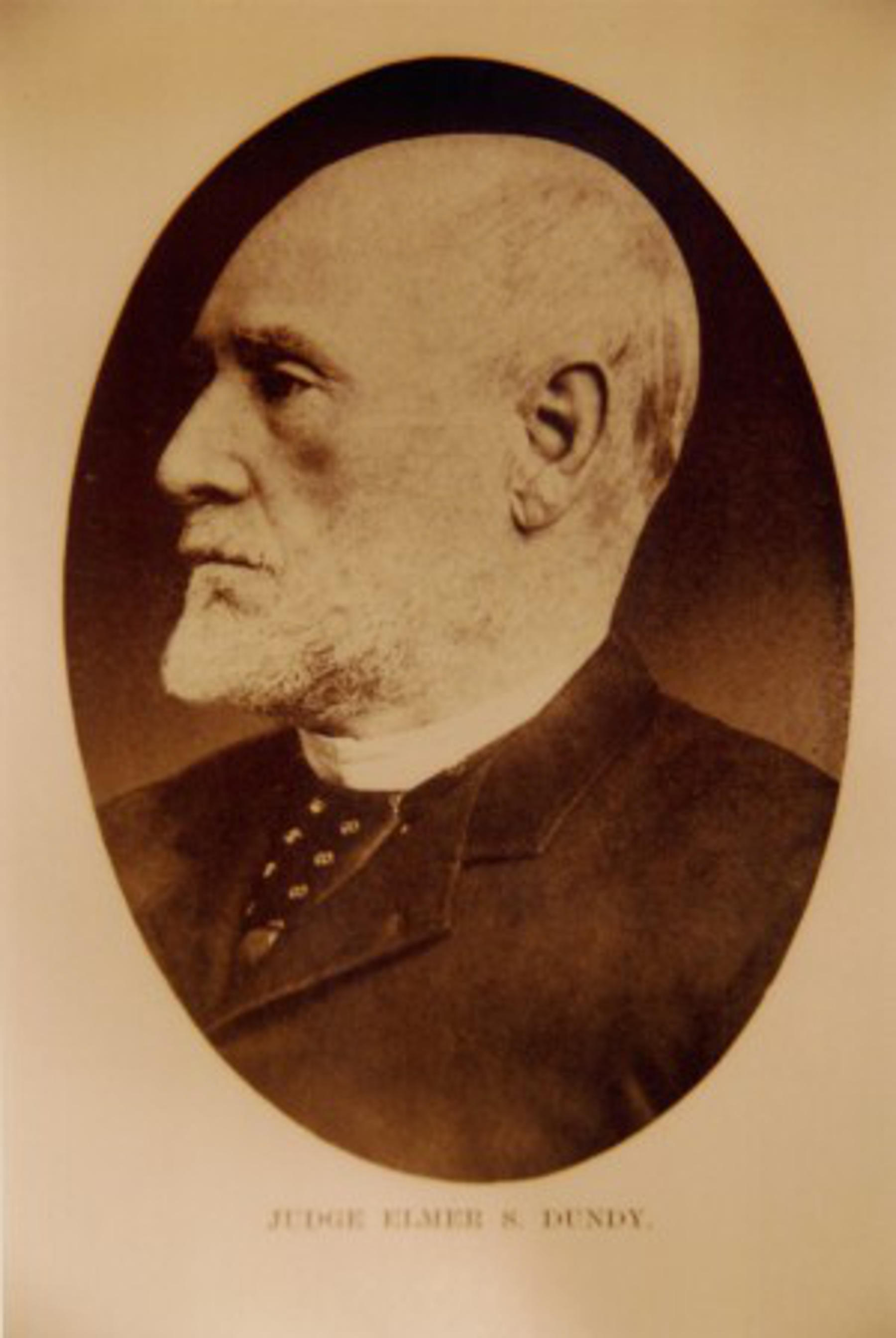
Dundy, c. 1895.

Following the admission of the State of Nebraska to the Union on March 1, 1867, Dundy was nominated by President Andrew Johnson on April 4, 1868, to the United States District Court for the District of Nebraska, to a new seat authorized by 15 Stat. 5. He was confirmed by the United States Senate on April 9, 1868, and received his commission the same day. His service terminated on October 28, 1896, due to his death in Omaha, Nebraska, at which time Dundy was the longest-serving judge appointed by Johnson.

== Notable cases ==
On May 12, 1879, Dundy ruled in the case Standing Bear v. Crook that Standing Bear and other Ponca were "people" who able to bring petitions for habeas corpus, and that Indians who had severed their relationships with their tribes could not be ordered to a reservation against their will. The next year, Dundy was part of the lower court panel that heard Elk v. Wilkins, which asserted that Indians who had left their tribes and submitted to the jurisdiction of the United States were American citizens. In 1884, the United States Supreme Court rejected Elk's petition, holding that Indians born in tribal relations in the United States could only become citizens under specific federal laws. It was not until 1924 that all Indians born in the United States were declared citizens with the passing of the Indian Citizenship Act of 1924.

== Dundy County ==
Dundy was the namesake of Dundy County, Nebraska.

== "Skip" Dundy ==
Dundy's son, Elmer Scipio Dundy Jr., better known as "Skip" Dundy, was born in Falls City, Nebraska in 1862. Skip Dundy grew up to become a promoter on Coney Island, due to in part the stories told by Buffalo Bill Cody who was a familiar visitor in the Dundy home.

== Sources ==
- "James, William Hartford". The Political Graveyard.
- "James, William Hartford". Judges of the United States Courts. Archived from the original on September 26, 2006.
- "Frederic Thompson and Elmer "Skip" Dundy". The American Experience.

Legal offices
Preceded by Seat established by 15 Stat. 5	Judge of the United States District Court for the District of Nebraska; 1868–1896	Succeeded by William Douglas McHugh
