= Camp Atlanta =

American camp for German POWs in Nebraska

Camp Atlanta (40.3845105°N 99.4598699°W) was a World War II camp for German prisoners of war (POWs) located next to Atlanta, Nebraska. Over three years, it housed nearly 3,000 prisoners. After the war, a number of soldiers and prisoners from the camp returned to live in the area.

== Operation ==
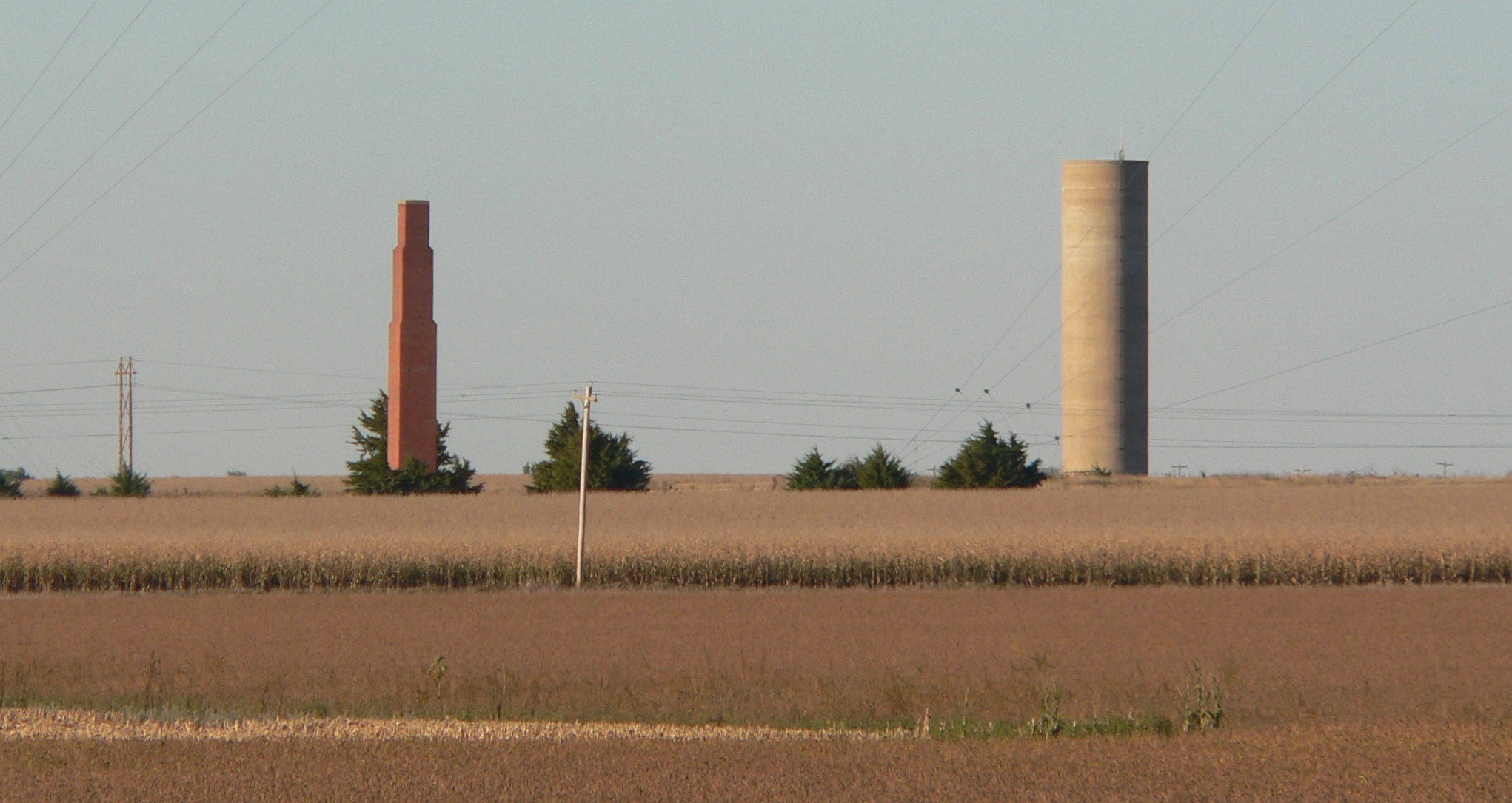
Chimney and water tower remaining at site of Camp Atlanta

The Atlanta area was the choice of the United States Army for a $2,000,000 prisoner-of-war camp after the outbreak of World War II. As with many such camps, the site was chosen because it was well in the interior of the United States. When construction began in September 1943, people were told this would be a "Conchie Camp" for American conscientious objectors. By November, however, it became known by locals that it would hold German soldiers.

The first 250 German prisoners arrived in December, unannounced to anyone but the officer in command at the camp. On a Saturday morning early in February 1944, 830 more arrived. The camp housed 3,000 German prisoners, most of whom had been captured in the North African Campaign, in three compounds. The guards numbered approximately 275 enlisted men and 60 officers.

The camp had its own train stop across from the prison gates, a chapel, a theater, a hospital, post exchange, a bakery, a laundry, and repair shops for all purposes. A 12-piece drum and bugle corps made up from the military men marched in the Holdrege Memorial Day parade in 1944. A ball club was organized to compete with the nearby Indianola POW camp.

Prisoners were hired out to local farms to help retrieve the increased crop production demanded by the war. More than 30 local farmers sought assistance, paying the government for work done by the POWs.

== Closing ==
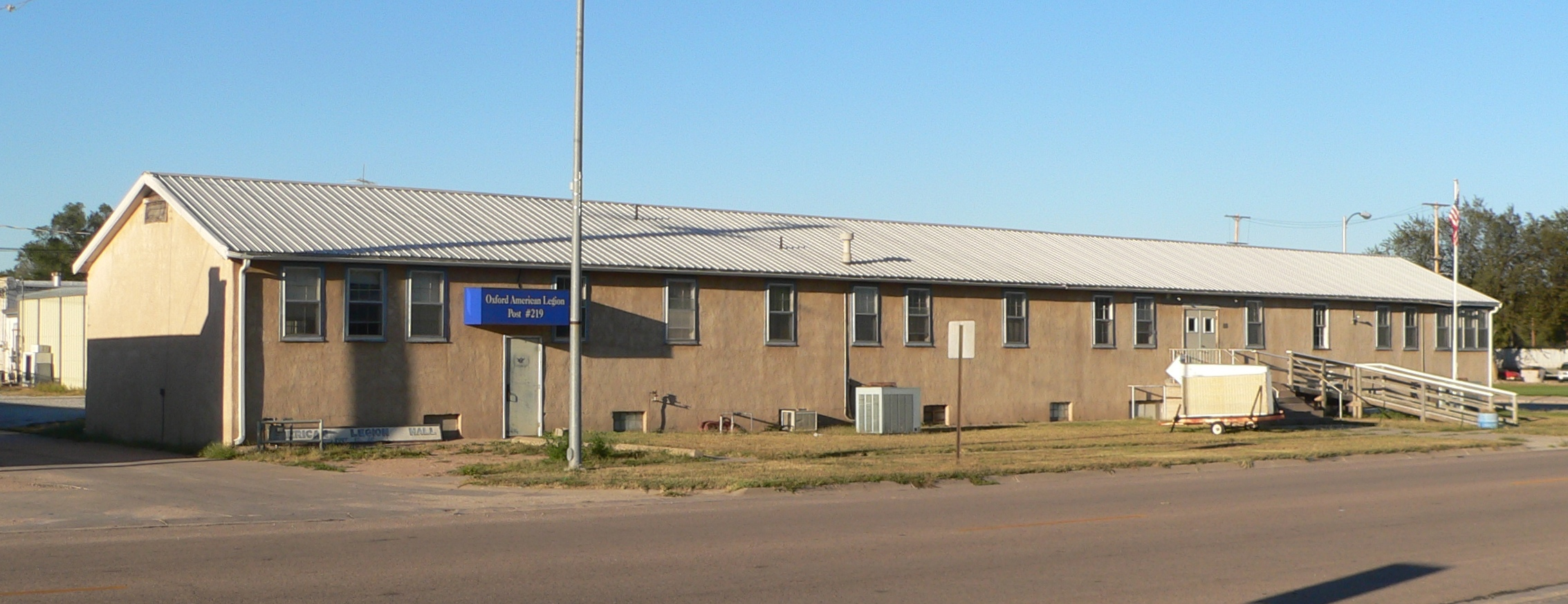
The American Legion Hall in Oxford, Nebraska was originally part of the post hospital at Camp Atlanta

Soon after the first of the year in 1946, after the war had ended, the government began shipping the prisoners back to their homes in Germany. Later in the year, all the frame buildings, plumbing and every sort of valuable material were stripped and sold at auction. By 1947, only acres of concrete slab, floors of barracks and other camp buildings remained. The only remnants of the camp include the water tower and two chimneys.

Some soldiers returned to live in Atlanta, and at least two of the Germans applied for American citizenship.

== See also ==
- History of Nebraska
