= Justice McHugh =

Justice McHugh may refer to:

- Michael McHugh (born 1935), justice of the High Court of Australia
- Thomas McHugh (judge) (born 1936), justice of the Supreme Court of Appeals of West Virginia

== See also ==
- Judge McHugh (disambiguation)
