= Atlanta, Nebraska =

City in Phelps County, Nebraska, U.S.

- Village
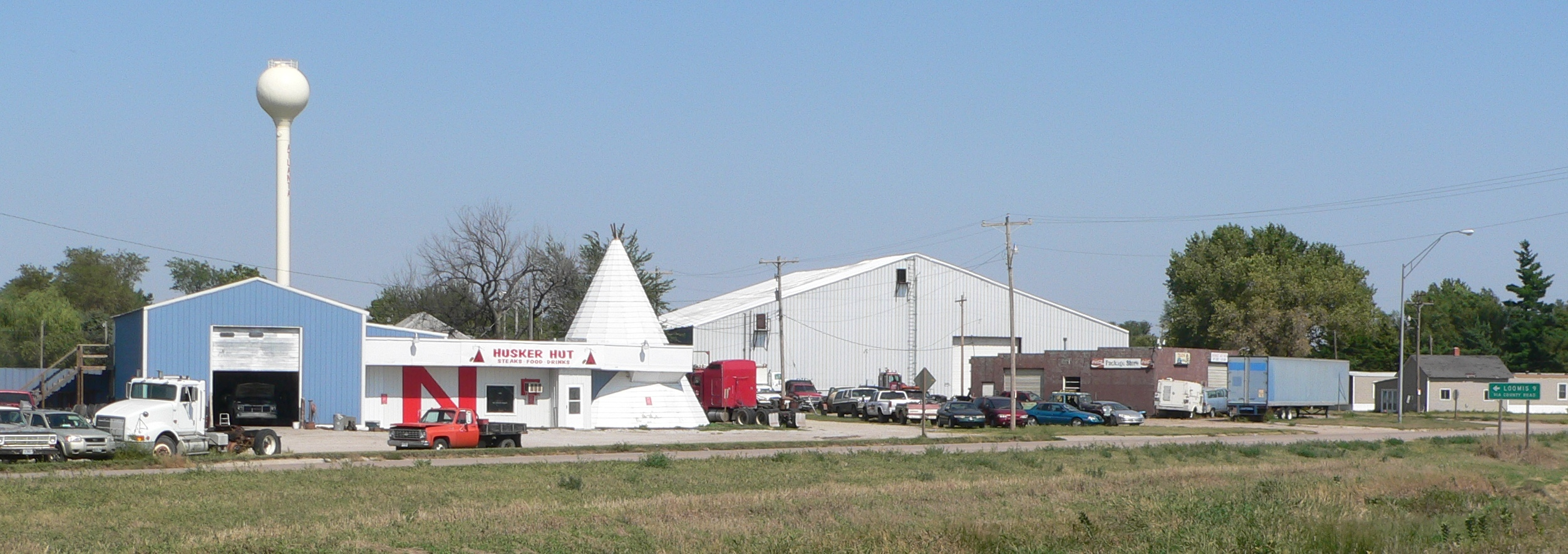
- Roadside businesses along U.S. Highway 6/34 in Atlanta

- Location of Atlanta, Nebraska
- Coordinates: 40°22′06″N 99°28′24″W
- Country: United States
- State: Nebraska
- County: Phelps

Area
  - Total: 0.23 sq mi (0.60 km^{2})
  - Land: 0.23 sq mi (0.60 km^{2})
  - Water: 0 sq mi (0.00 km^{2})
- Elevation: 2,346 ft (715 m)

Population (2020)
  - Total: 106
  - Density: 460/sq mi (177/km^{2})
- Time zone: UTC-6 (Central (CST))
  - Summer (DST): UTC-5 (CDT)
- ZIP code: 68923
- Area code: 308
- FIPS code: 31-02620
- GNIS feature ID: 2398005

Atlanta is a village in Phelps County, Nebraska, United States. The population was 106 at the 2020 census. During World War II, the town was neighbored by Camp Atlanta, which housed more than 3,000 Nazi German prisoners of war over three years. The camp was said to house more prisoners during the war than the town had in population during its entire existence.

== History ==
Atlanta was laid out in 1883 when the Chicago, Burlington & Quincy Railroad was extended to that point. It was likely named after Atlanta, Georgia.

In the first part of the 20th century, Atlanta was home to several amenities for neighboring farmers. They included a grocery store, post office, cafe, and a tourist shop for drivers on U.S. Route 6, as well as corn and grain elevators and two gas stations. Chataqua groups entertained at the town hall, with annual events such as the Atlanta Institute, which was an annual fair. There were also free outdoor "picture shows", and the Atlanta Industry Day Picnic. The Atlanta schoolhouse had eight grades. At the beginning of World War II, there was one street, approximately two blocks long, with only a few business buildings drooping and dwindling along its edges.

== Camp Atlanta ==
During World War II, Camp Atlanta was established next to the town as an Allied POW camp to house German POWs. The Atlanta area had been the final choice of the U.S. Army to establish a $2 million POW camp after the outbreak of World War II. When construction began in September 1943 people were told this would be a "Conchie Camp" for the conscientious objectors from the United States. By November it became known by locals that Atlanta would be a prisoner-of-war camp expected to guard German prisoners. There were approximately 275 enlisted men and 60 officers.

Soldiers were hired out to local farms to help retrieve the increased crop production demanded by the war. More than 30 local farmers sought assistance, paying the government for work completed by the POWs. Soon after the first of the year in 1946, some soldiers returned to live in Atlanta, and at least two of the Germans applied for U.S. citizenship and returned as well.

== Geography ==
According to the United States Census Bureau, the village has a total area of 0.23 square miles (0.60 km^{2}), all land.

== Demographics ==
Historical population
Census	Pop.	Note	%±
1910	250		—
1920	258		3.2%
1930	207		−19.8%
1940	173		−16.4%
1950	147		−15.0%
1960	107		−27.2%
1970	101		−5.6%
1980	102		1.0%
1990	114		11.8%
2000	130		14.0%
2010	131		0.8%
2020	106		−19.1%
U.S. Decennial Census

=== 2010 census ===
As of the census of 2010, there were 131 people, 52 households, and 39 families residing in the village. The population density was 569.6 inhabitants per square mile (219.9/km^{2}). There were 60 housing units at an average density of 260.9 per square mile (100.7/km^{2}). The racial makeup of the village was 99.2% White and 0.8% Native American.

There were 52 households, of which 44.2% had children under the age of 18 living with them, 57.7% were married couples living together, 7.7% had a female householder with no husband present, 9.6% had a male householder with no wife present, and 25.0% were non-families. 25.0% of all households were made up of individuals, and 7.6% had someone living alone who was 65 years of age or older. The average household size was 2.52 and the average family size was 2.97.

The median age in the village was 38.5 years. 29.8% of residents were under the age of 18; 1.4% were between the ages of 18 and 24; 29.7% were from 25 to 44; 33.6% were from 45 to 64; and 5.3% were 65 years of age or older. The gender makeup of the village was 47.3% male and 52.7% female.

=== 2000 census ===
As of the census of 2000, there were 130 people, 53 households, and 34 families residing in the village. The population density was 563.4 inhabitants per square mile (217.5/km^{2}). There were 56 housing units at an average density of 242.7 per square mile (93.7/km^{2}). The racial makeup of the village was 98.46% White and 1.54% Native American.

There were 53 households, out of which 34.0% had children under the age of 18 living with them, 56.6% were married couples living together, 5.7% had a female householder with no husband present, and 35.8% were non-families. 28.3% of all households were made up of individuals, and 13.2% had someone living alone who was 65 years of age or older. The average household size was 2.45 and the average family size was 3.00.

In the village, the population was spread out, with 26.2% under the age of 18, 8.5% from 18 to 24, 33.1% from 25 to 44, 23.8% from 45 to 64, and 8.5% who were 65 years of age or older. The median age was 37 years. For every 100 females, there were 88.4 males. For every 100 females age 18 and over, there were 95.9 males.

As of 2000 the median income for a household in the village was $32,708, and the median income for a family was $36,875. Males had a median income of $27,500 versus $14,821 for females. The per capita income for the village was $14,469. There were 12.1% of families and 9.9% of the population living below the poverty line, including 25.0% of under eighteens and none of those over 64.

== Notable people ==
- Warren Keith Urbom, United States District Court Judge, was born in Atlanta.
