= United States District Court for the District of Nebraska =

United States federal court with jurisdiction in Nebraska

- (D. Neb.)
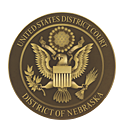

- Location: Roman L. Hruska Federal Courthouse (Omaha) More locations: Robert V. Denney Federal Building (Lincoln); North Platte
- Appeals to: Eighth Circuit
- Established: March 25, 1867
- Judges: 3
- Chief Judge: Brian C. Buescher

Officers of the court
- U.S. Attorney: Lesley Woods Murphy
- U.S. Marshal: Scott E. Kracl
- www.ned.uscourts.gov

The United States District Court for the District of Nebraska (in case citations, D. Neb.) is the federal district court whose jurisdiction is the state of Nebraska. Court offices are in Omaha and Lincoln.

Appeals from the District of Nebraska are taken to the United States Court of Appeals for the Eighth Circuit (except for patent claims and claims against the U.S. government under the Tucker Act, which are appealed to the Federal Circuit).

The United States Attorney's Office for the District of Nebraska represents the United States in civil and criminal litigation in the court. As of 2025, the U.S. Attorney is Lesley Woods Murphy.

== Notable case ==
In May 2005, Judge Joseph Bataillon struck down a constitutional amendment passed by Nebraska voters in 2000 that would have banned gay marriages. That decision, however, was reversed by the United States Court of Appeals for the Eighth Circuit. In its opinion issued on July 14, 2006, the Eighth Circuit held: the amendment rationally related to legitimate state interests, and therefore did not violate the Equal Protection Clause; the amendment could not be considered a bill of attainder; the amendment did not violate homosexuals' First Amendment right to associate; and the amendment did not violate homosexuals' First Amendment right to petition the government for redress of grievances.

== Current judges ==
As of July 16, 2026:

#	Title	Judge	Duty station	Born	Term of service			Appointed by
#	Title	Judge	Duty station	Born	Active	Chief	Senior	Appointed by
23	Chief Judge	Brian C. Buescher	Omaha	1975	2019–present	2026–present	—	Trump
22	District Judge	Robert F. Rossiter Jr.	Omaha	1956	2016–present	2021–2026	—	Obama
24	District Judge	Susan M. Bazis	Lincoln	1968	2024–present	—	—	Biden
19	Senior Judge	Joseph Bataillon	Omaha	1949	1997–2014	2004–2011	2014–present	Clinton
21	Senior Judge	John M. Gerrard	Lincoln	1953	2012–2023	2018–2021	2023–present	Obama

== Vacancies and pending nominations ==
Seat	Prior judge's duty station	Seat last held by	Vacancy reason	Date of vacancy	Nominee	Date of nomination
1	Omaha	Robert F. Rossiter Jr.	Senior status	TBD	Eric J. Hamilton	November 9, 2026

== Former judges ==
#	Judge	Born–died	Active service	Chief Judge	Senior status	Appointed by	Reason for termination
1	Elmer Scipio Dundy	1830–1896	1868–1896	—	—	A. Johnson	death
2	William Douglas McHugh	1859–1923	1896–1897 (Note: Recess appointment; the United States Senate later rejected the appointment.)	—	—	Cleveland	not confirmed
3	William Henry Munger	1845–1915	1897–1915	—	—	Cleveland	death
4	Thomas Charles Munger	1861–1941	1907–1941	—	1941	T. Roosevelt	death
5	Joseph William Woodrough	1873–1977	1916–1933	—	—	Wilson	elevation
6	James A. Donohoe	1877–1956	1933–1956	1948–1956	—	F. Roosevelt	death
7	John Wayne Delehant	1890–1972	1942–1957	1956–1957	1957–1972	F. Roosevelt	death
8	Richard Earl Robinson	1903–1991	1956–1972	1957–1972	1972–1991	Eisenhower	death
9	Robert Van Pelt	1897–1988	1957–1970	—	1970–1988	Eisenhower	death
10	Warren Keith Urbom	1925–2017	1970–1990	1972–1986	1990–2017	Nixon	death
11	Robert Vernon Denney	1916–1981	1971–1981	—	1981	Nixon	death
12	Richard A. Dier	1914–1972	1971–1972	—	—	Nixon	death
13	Albert Gerard Schatz	1921–1985	1973–1985	—	—	Nixon	death
14	C. Arlen Beam	1930–2025	1981–1987	1986–1987	—	Reagan	elevation
15	Lyle Elmer Strom	1925–2023	1985–1995	1987–1994	1995–2023	Reagan	death
16	William G. Cambridge	1931–2004	1988–2000	1994–1999	—	Reagan	retirement
17	Richard G. Kopf	1946–2025	1992–2011	1999–2004	2011–2025	G.H.W. Bush	death
18	Thomas Michael Shanahan	1934–2011	1993–2004	—	2004–2011	Clinton	death
20	Laurie Smith Camp	1953–2020	2001–2018	2011–2018	2018–2020	G.W. Bush	death

== Chief judges ==
Chief judges have administrative responsibilities with respect to their district court. Unlike the Supreme Court, where one justice is specifically nominated to be chief, the office of chief judge rotates among the district court judges. To be chief, a judge must have been in active service on the court for at least one year, be under the age of 65, and have not previously served as chief judge.

A vacancy is filled by the judge highest in seniority among the group of qualified judges. The chief judge serves for a term of seven years, or until age 70, whichever occurs first. The age restrictions are waived if no members of the court would otherwise be qualified for the position.

When the office was created in 1948, the chief judge was the longest-serving judge who had not elected to retire, on what has since 1958 been known as senior status, or declined to serve as chief judge. After August 6, 1959, judges could not become or remain chief after turning 70 years old. The current rules have been in operation since October 1, 1982.

== Succession of seats ==
Seat 1
Seat established on March 25, 1867 by 15 Stat. 5
Dundy	1868–1896
McHugh	1896–1897
W. Munger	1897–1915
Woodrough	1916–1933
Donohoe	1933–1956
Robinson	1956–1972
Dier	1971–1972
Schatz	1973–1985
Strom	1985–1995
Bataillon	1997–2014
Rossiter, Jr.	2016–present

Seat 2
Seat established on February 27, 1907 by 34 Stat. 997
T. Munger	1907–1941
Delehant	1942–1957
Van Pelt	1957–1970
Urbom	1970–1990
Kopf	1992–2011
Gerrard	2012–2023
Bazis	2024–present

Seat 3
Seat established on June 2, 1970 by 84 Stat. 294
Denney	1971–1981
Beam	1981–1987
Cambridge	1988–2000
Smith Camp	2001–2018
Buescher	2019–present

Seat 4
Seat established on December 1, 1990 by 104 Stat. 5089 (temporary)
Shanahan	1993–2004
Seat abolished on May 5, 2004 (temporary judgeship expired)

== See also ==
- Courts of Nebraska
- List of current United States district judges
- List of United States federal courthouses in Nebraska
