= Robert Van Pelt =

American judge

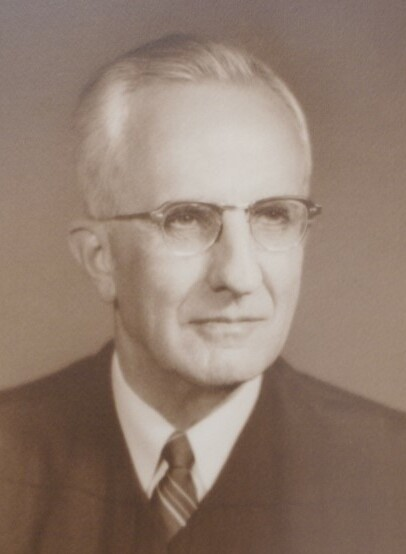

Senior Judge of the United States District Court for the District of Nebraska
- In office May 5, 1970 – April 27, 1988

Judge of the United States District Court for the District of Nebraska
- In office June 13, 1957 – May 5, 1970
- Appointed by: Dwight D. Eisenhower
- Preceded by: John Wayne Delehant
- Succeeded by: Warren Keith Urbom

Personal details
- Born: Robert Van Pelt; September 9, 1897 Gosper County, Nebraska
- Died: April 27, 1988 (aged 90)
- Education: Stockville High School; Franklin Academy; Doane University (A.B.); University of Nebraska College of Law (LL.B.)

Robert Van Pelt (September 9, 1897 – April 27, 1988) was an American attorney and served as a United States district judge of the United States District Court for the District of Nebraska.

== Early life and career ==
Born in Gosper County, Nebraska, and raised in Stockville, Van Pelt was early exposed to lawyers and judges through the boarding house his mother operated in the county seat of Frontier County. Only having ten grades in Stockville, Van Pelt proceeded to the Franklin Academy in Franklin, Nebraska, a school affiliated with the Congregational Church.

He spent two years away from his own formal education after Franklin Academy. During this time he became a school teacher at a one-room schoolhouse just north of Stockville, Deputy County Treasurer of Frontier County, and, at the suggestion of the county treasurer, began to write hail insurance to fund his post-secondary education.

His time at the Franklin Academy afforded him an academic scholarship to another Congregational Church-affiliated school, Doane College in Crete, Nebraska, where he received an Artium Baccalaureus degree in 1920. In addition to writing hail insurance to fund his studies, he began selling books for James Wick (who would later go on to found Wick Communications). He continued to the University of Nebraska College of Law where he was awarded Bachelor of Laws in 1922. He would later serve as an instructor at the University of Nebraska College of Law from 1946 to 1957.

While still a student, purchasing forms for a mortgage course, he encountered a former Southwest Nebraska district judge whom he recognized from his boyhood in Stockville, Judge E.B. Perry, and was offered an internship at Stewart, Perry, Stewart in Lincoln.

=== Legal Practice ===
Van Pelt began working for the Stewart, Perry, Stewart law firm while still in law school in the spring of 1921. In 1925, the law firm became that of Stewart, Perry, Stewart, and Van Pelt. In September 1925, E.B. Perry and Van Pelt dissolved stake in the partnership and formed the Perry & Van Pelt law firm that subsequent October. In 1928, Lloyd J. Marti joined the firm and it thus became Perry, Van Pelt & Marti until Van Pelt and Marti left this firm to form the new partnership of Van Pelt, Marti, and O'Gara. Lloyd J. Marti later assumed the position of Mayor of Lincoln, Nebraska from 1943 to 1947. and Van Pelt served as Deputy United States Attorney for the District of Nebraska from 1930 to 1934.

== Federal Judicial Service ==
Van Pelt was nominated by President Dwight D. Eisenhower on May 22, 1957, to a seat on the United States District Court for the District of Nebraska vacated by Judge John Wayne Delehant. He was confirmed by the United States Senate on June 11, 1957, and received his commission on June 13, 1957. He assumed senior status on May 5, 1970, and his service terminated on April 27, 1988, upon his death.

=== Notable Work ===
While on the federal bench, Van Pelt was appointed to the committee that drafted the Federal Rules of Evidence by Chief Justice Earl Warren, by Chief Justice Warren Burger to a committee to oversee the Federal Magistrates Act of 1968, to the Committee of Judicial Ethics, and was named Special Master by the Supreme Court for four boundary disputes {Texas v. Louisiana, 426 U.S. 465 (1976), California v. Nevada, 447 U.S. 125 (1980), Ohio v. Kentucky, Illinois v. Kentucky, 444 U.S. 335 (1980), and Kentucky v. Indiana, 474 U.S. 1 (1976)}.

== Community Membership ==
- President of the Lincoln Rotary Club #14 in the years 1935-1936
- Member of the Lincoln Board of Education
- Member of the Doane College Board of Trustees
- Member Board of Directors, Lincoln Chamber of Commerce
- Member United States Junior Chamber of Commerce
- Republican National Convention Delegate in 1940, 1944, and 1948

Legal offices
Preceded by John Wayne Delehant	Judge of the United States District Court for the District of Nebraska; 1957–1970	Succeeded by Warren Keith Urbom
