= John Wayne Delehant =

American judge

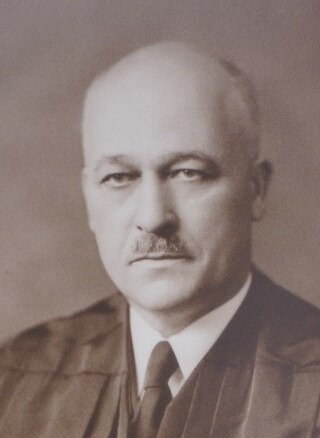

Senior Judge of the United States District Court for the District of Nebraska
- In office April 30, 1957 – April 20, 1972

Chief Judge of the United States District Court for the District of Nebraska
- In office 1956–1957
- Preceded by: James A. Donohoe
- Succeeded by: Richard Earl Robinson

Judge of the United States District Court for the District of Nebraska
- In office February 13, 1942 – April 30, 1957
- Appointed by: Franklin D. Roosevelt
- Preceded by: Thomas Charles Munger
- Succeeded by: Robert Van Pelt

Personal details
- Born: John Wayne Delehant; September 3, 1890 Goodland, Kansas
- Died: April 20, 1972 (aged 81) Omaha, Nebraska
- Education: Creighton University (A.B., A.M.); Creighton University School of Law (LL.B.)

John Wayne Delehant (September 3, 1890 – April 20, 1972) was a United States district judge of the United States District Court for the District of Nebraska.

== Education and career ==
Born in Goodland, Kansas, Delehant received an Artium Baccalaureus degree from Creighton University in 1910, an Artium Magister degree from the same institution in 1911, and a Bachelor of Laws from Creighton University School of Law in 1913. He was in private practice in Beatrice, Nebraska from 1913 to 1942.

== Federal judicial service ==
On January 19, 1942, Delehant was nominated by President Franklin D. Roosevelt to a seat on the United States District Court for the District of Nebraska vacated by Judge Thomas Charles Munger. Delehant was confirmed by the United States Senate on February 9, 1942, and received his commission on February 13, 1942. He served as Chief Judge from 1956 to 1957, assuming senior status on April 30, 1957. Delehant served in that capacity until his death on April 20, 1972, in Omaha, Nebraska.

== Sources ==
Legal offices
Preceded by Thomas Charles Munger	Judge of the United States District Court for the District of Nebraska; 1942–1957	Succeeded by Robert Van Pelt
Preceded by James A. Donohoe	Chief Judge of the United States District Court for the District of Nebraska; 1956–1957	Succeeded by Richard Earl Robinson
