= List of federal judges appointed by Franklin D. Roosevelt =

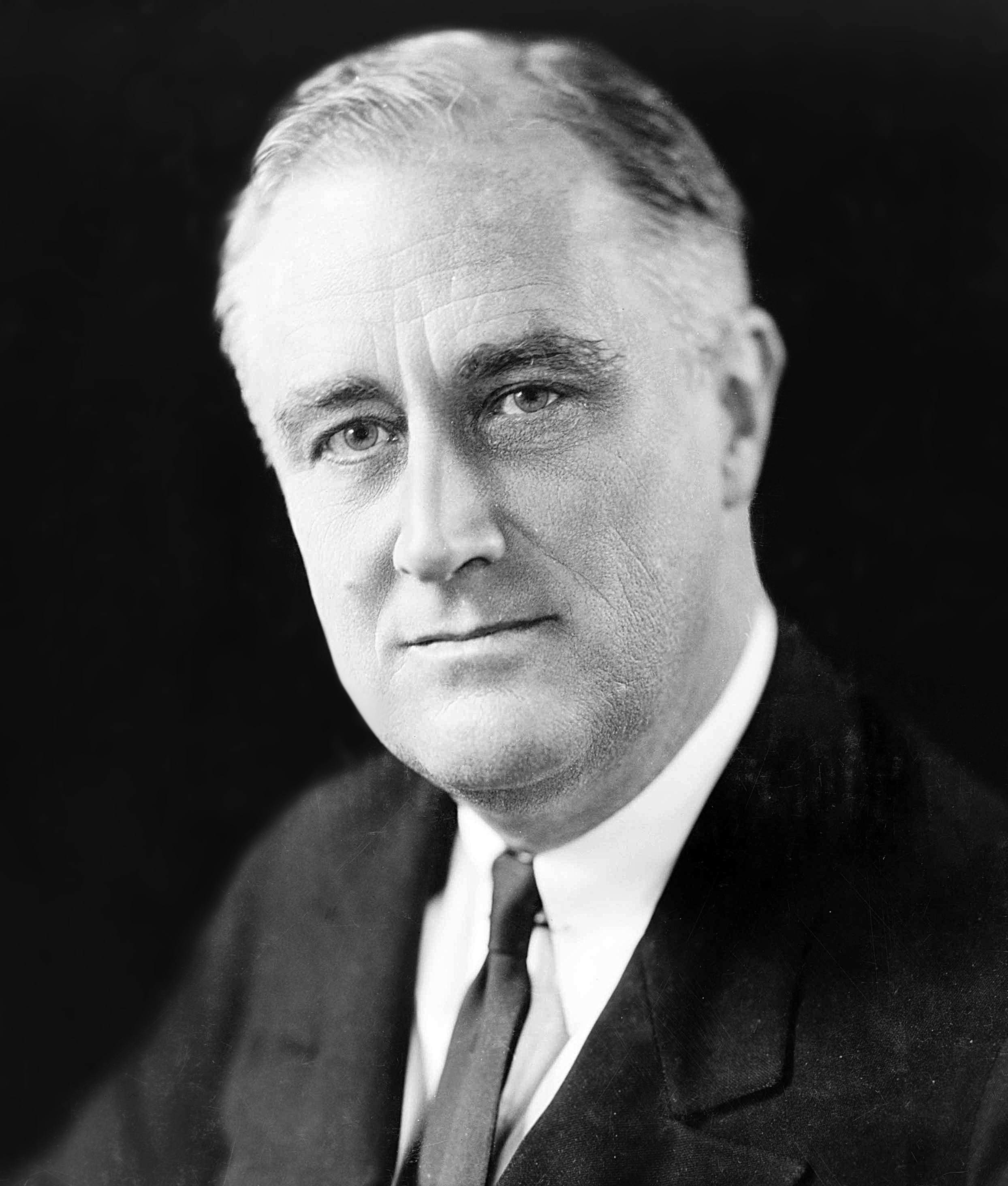
President Franklin D. Roosevelt.

Following is a list of all Article III United States federal judges appointed by President Franklin D. Roosevelt during his presidency. In total Roosevelt appointed 194 Article III federal judges, more than twice as many as the previous record of 82 appointed by Calvin Coolidge. Among them were: nine justices to the Supreme Court of the United States, including the appointment of a sitting associate justice as chief justice, 51 judges to the United States Courts of Appeals, and 134 judges to the United States district courts.

Additionally, 13 Article I federal judge appointments are listed, including 3 judges to the United States Court of Customs and Patent Appeals, 4 judges to the United States Court of Claims and 6 judges to the United States Customs Court.

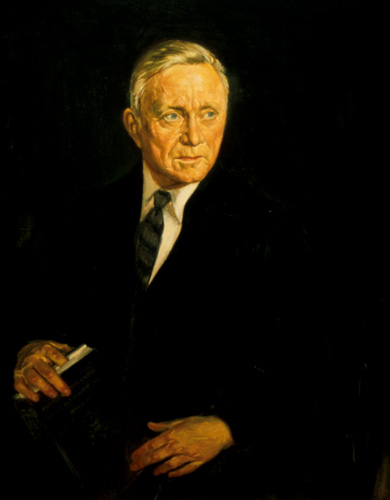
Roosevelt appointee William O. Douglas was the longest-serving Supreme Court justice in U.S. history.

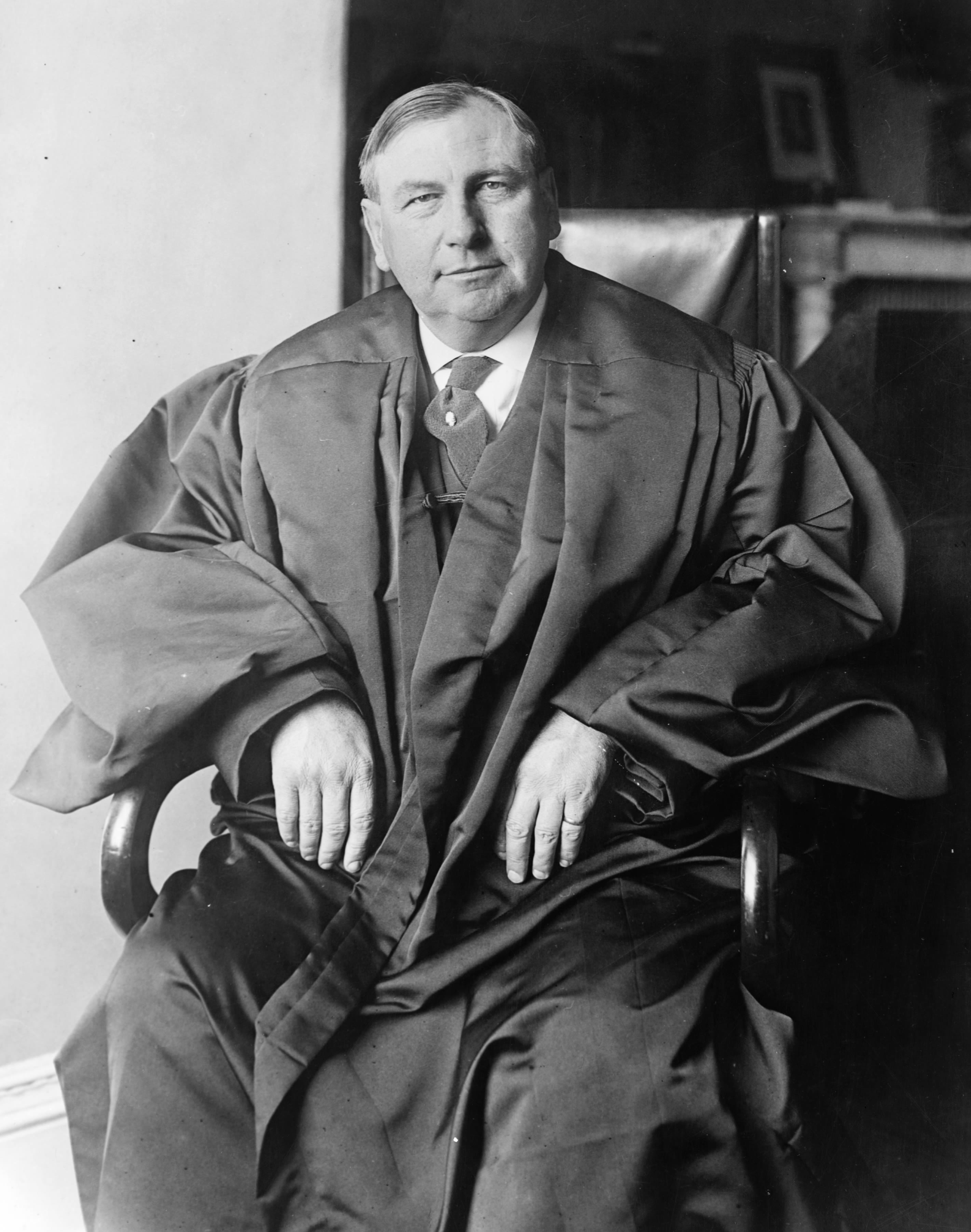
Roosevelt elevated sitting Justice Harlan F. Stone to Chief Justice of the United States.

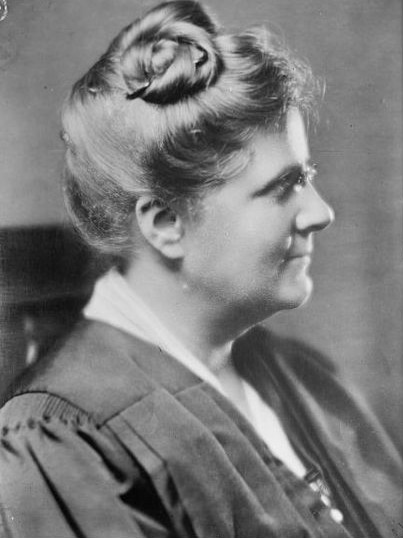
Florence Ellinwood Allen, appointed by Roosevelt to the United States Court of Appeals for the Sixth Circuit, was the first woman appointed to a federal appellate court.

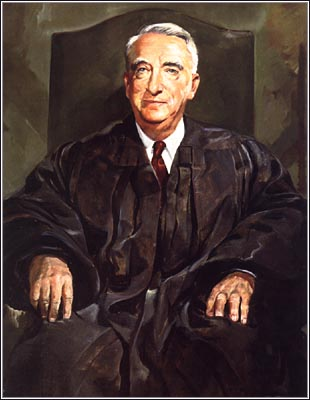
Fred M. Vinson, appointed by Roosevelt to the United States Court of Appeals for the District of Columbia Circuit, would later be appointed by President Truman to serve as Chief Justice of the United States.

== United States Supreme Court justices ==
#	Justice	Seat	State	Former justice	Nomination date	Confirmation date	Confirmation vote	Began active service	Ended active service	Ended retired service
1	Hugo Black	1	Alabama	Willis Van Devanter	August 12, 1937	August 17, 1937	63–16	August 18, 1937	September 17, 1971	–
2	Stanley Forman Reed	6	Kentucky	George Sutherland	January 15, 1938	January 25, 1938	voice vote	January 27, 1938	February 25, 1957	February 2, 1980
3	Felix Frankfurter	2	New York	Benjamin N. Cardozo	January 5, 1939	January 17, 1939	voice vote	January 20, 1939	August 28, 1962	February 22, 1965
4	William O. Douglas	4	Washington	Louis Brandeis	March 20, 1939	April 4, 1939	62–4	April 15, 1939	November 12, 1975	January 19, 1980
5	Frank Murphy	10	Michigan	Pierce Butler	January 4, 1940	January 16, 1940	voice vote	January 18, 1940	July 19, 1949	–
6	James F. Byrnes	3	South Carolina	James Clark McReynolds	June 12, 1941	June 12, 1941	voice vote	June 25, 1941	October 3, 1942	–
7	Harlan F. Stone	Chief	New York	Charles Evans Hughes	June 12, 1941	June 27, 1941	voice vote	July 3, 1941	April 22, 1946	–
8	Robert H. Jackson	9	New York	Harlan F. Stone	June 12, 1941	July 7, 1941	voice vote	July 11, 1941	October 9, 1954	–
9	Wiley Rutledge	3	Missouri	James F. Byrnes	January 11, 1943	February 8, 1943	voice vote	February 11, 1943	September 10, 1949	–

== Courts of appeals ==
#	Judge	Circuit	Nomination date	Confirmation date	Began active service	Ended active service	Ended senior status
1	Joseph William Woodrough	Eighth	April 3, 1933	April 12, 1933	April 12, 1933	January 3, 1961	October 2, 1977
2	Francis Arthur Garrecht	Ninth	May 4, 1933	May 16, 1933	May 19, 1933	August 11, 1948	–
3	Sam G. Bratton	Tenth	June 1, 1933	June 1, 1933	June 1, 1933	March 1, 1961	September 22, 1963
4	Louis FitzHenry	Seventh	June 3, 1933	June 10, 1933	June 16, 1933	November 18, 1935	–
5	Florence E. Allen	Sixth	March 6, 1934	March 15, 1934	March 21, 1934	October 5, 1959	September 12, 1966
6	Charles Breckenridge Faris	Eighth	January 14, 1935	January 25, 1935	January 31, 1935	November 30, 1935	December 18, 1938
7	William Denman	Ninth	January 10, 1935	January 29, 1935	February 1, 1935	July 3, 1957	March 9, 1959
8	Clifton Mathews	Ninth	March 13, 1935	March 20, 1935	March 23, 1935	June 30, 1953	September 7, 1962
9	Harold Montelle Stephens	D.C.	July 23, 1935	July 24, 1935	July 27, 1935	March 9, 1948	–
10	Bert E. Haney	Ninth	August 21, 1935	August 23, 1935	August 24, 1935	September 18, 1943	–
11	Seth Thomas	Eighth	January 6, 1936	January 22, 1936	December 2, 1935	May 1, 1954	February 2, 1962
12	Edwin R. Holmes	Fifth	August 23, 1935	March 19, 1936	March 20, 1936	November 30, 1954	December 10, 1961
13	John Biggs Jr.	Third	February 3, 1937	February 10, 1937	February 16, 1937	October 30, 1965	April 15, 1979
14	James Earl Major	Seventh	March 9, 1937	March 17, 1937	March 23, 1937	March 23, 1956	January 4, 1972
15	Robert L. Williams	Tenth	March 25, 1937	April 20, 1937	April 21, 1937	March 31, 1939	April 10, 1948
16	Albert Lee Stephens Sr.	Ninth	June 8, 1937	June 15, 1937	June 18, 1937	January 25, 1961	January 15, 1965
17	William Healy	Ninth	June 8, 1937	June 15, 1937	June 21, 1937	November 30, 1958	March 15, 1962
18	Justin Miller	D.C.	August 20, 1937	August 21, 1937	August 23, 1937	September 30, 1945	–
19	Duncan Lawrence Groner	D.C.	November 26, 1937	December 3, 1937	December 7, 1937	March 8, 1948	July 17, 1957
20	Henry White Edgerton	D.C.	November 26, 1937	December 9, 1937	December 15, 1937	April 22, 1963	February 23, 1970
21	Fred M. Vinson	D.C.	November 26, 1937	December 9, 1937	December 15, 1937	May 28, 1943	–
22	Walter Emanuel Treanor	Seventh	December 11, 1937	December 21, 1937	December 27, 1937	April 26, 1941	–
23	Elwood Hamilton	Sixth	February 25, 1938	March 1, 1938	March 4, 1938	September 19, 1945	–
24	Albert Branson Maris	Third	June 14, 1938	June 16, 1938	June 24, 1938	December 31, 1958	February 7, 1989
25	Leon Clarence McCord	Fifth	June 9, 1938	June 15, 1938	June 24, 1938	February 26, 1951	February 11, 1952
26	William Clark	Third	June 10, 1938	June 16, 1938	June 25, 1938	March 24, 1943	–
27	Otto Kerner Sr.	Seventh	January 5, 1939	February 1, 1939	November 21, 1938	December 13, 1952	–
28	Herschel W. Arant	Sixth	February 9, 1939	February 21, 1939	March 4, 1939	January 14, 1941	–
29	Francis Biddle	Third	February 9, 1939	February 28, 1939	March 4, 1939	January 22, 1940	–
30	Charles Edward Clark	Second	January 5, 1939	March 7, 1939	March 9, 1939	December 13, 1963	–
31	Robert P. Patterson	Second	February 9, 1939	March 20, 1939	March 21, 1939	July 30, 1940	–
32	Wiley Rutledge	D.C.	March 21, 1939	April 4, 1939	May 2, 1939	February 14, 1943	Elevated
33	Walter A. Huxman	Tenth	April 24, 1939	May 17, 1939	May 23, 1939	April 1, 1957	June 25, 1972
34	Calvert Magruder	First	April 24, 1939	June 1, 1939	June 3, 1939	June 12, 1959	May 22, 1968
35	Charles Alvin Jones	Third	July 14, 1939	July 18, 1939	July 25, 1939	December 31, 1944	–
36	Armistead Mason Dobie	Fourth	January 11, 1940	February 1, 1940	December 19, 1939	February 1, 1956	August 7, 1962
37	John Christopher Mahoney	First	January 11, 1940	February 7, 1940	February 12, 1940	December 20, 1950	November 18, 1952
38	Herbert Funk Goodrich	Third	March 5, 1940	May 7, 1940	May 10, 1940	June 25, 1962	–
39	John Donelson Martin Sr.	Sixth	August 12, 1940	August 27, 1940	September 4, 1940	April 2, 1962	–
40	Alfred P. Murrah	Tenth	August 5, 1940	August 29, 1940	September 4, 1940	May 1, 1970	October 30, 1975
41	Harvey M. Johnsen	Eighth	October 1, 1940	October 7, 1940	October 14, 1940	August 1, 1965	September 15, 1975
42	Peter Woodbury	First	January 31, 1941	February 18, 1941	February 25, 1941	December 31, 1964	November 17, 1970
43	Jerome Frank	Second	February 13, 1941	March 20, 1941	March 27, 1941	January 13, 1957	–
44	Thomas Francis McAllister	Sixth	April 25, 1941	May 19, 1941	May 22, 1941	January 1, 1963	November 10, 1976
45	Sherman Minton	Seventh	May 7, 1941	May 19, 1941	May 22, 1941	October 11, 1949	Elevated
46	Walter Garrett Riddick	Eighth	December 1, 1941	December 16, 1941	December 19, 1941	July 31, 1953	–
47	Curtis L. Waller	Fifth	February 18, 1943	March 9, 1943	March 10, 1943	July 11, 1950	–
48	Thurman Arnold	D.C.	February 11, 1943	March 9, 1943	March 11, 1943	July 9, 1945	–
49	Gerald McLaughlin	Third	May 24, 1943	June 8, 1943	June 14, 1943	July 15, 1968	December 6, 1977
50	Elmo Pearce Lee	Fifth	November 5, 1943	November 30, 1943	December 17, 1943	July 26, 1949	–
51	Homer Bone	Ninth	April 1, 1944	April 1, 1944	April 1, 1944	January 1, 1956	March 11, 1970

== District courts ==
#	Judge	Court (Note: See List of United States district and territorial courts)	Nomination date	Confirmation date	Began active service	Ended active service	Ended senior status
1	James A. Donohoe	D. Neb.	April 15, 1933	April 20, 1933	April 27, 1933	February 26, 1956	–
2	Heartsill Ragon	W.D. Ark.	May 12, 1933	May 12, 1933	May 17, 1933	September 15, 1940	–
3	James Earl Major	S.D. Ill.	January 8, 1934	January 23, 1934	June 12, 1933	April 5, 1937	Elevated
4	Robert C. Bell	D. Minn.	June 8, 1933	June 10, 1933	June 13, 1933	May 1, 1961	March 17, 1964
5	Patrick Thomas Stone	W.D. Wis.	June 9, 1933	June 10, 1933	June 13, 1933	January 13, 1963	–
6	William Harrison Holly	N.D. Ill.	January 8, 1934	February 20, 1934	November 8, 1933	December 31, 1943	January 30, 1958
7	Philip Leo Sullivan	N.D. Ill.	January 8, 1934	February 20, 1934	November 8, 1933	June 12, 1960	–
8	John Clyde Bowen	W.D. Wash.	February 22, 1934	February 28, 1934	March 20, 1934	June 5, 1961	April 27, 1978
9	Augustus V. Long	N.D. Fla.	May 26, 1934	May 29, 1934	June 4, 1934	October 1, 1947	May 20, 1955
10	Francis Kerschner Myers	E.D.S.C.	June 6, 1934	June 9, 1934	June 14, 1934	August 2, 1940	–
11	George Murray Hulbert	S.D.N.Y.	June 6, 1934	June 14, 1934	June 15, 1934	April 26, 1950	–
12	Harlan W. Rippey	W.D.N.Y.	June 9, 1934	June 14, 1934	June 18, 1934	December 31, 1936	–
13	John McDuffie	S.D. Ala.	January 31, 1935	February 7, 1935	February 8, 1935	November 1, 1950	–
14	Hiram Church Ford	E.D. Ky.	March 19, 1935	March 27, 1935	March 28, 1935	January 1, 1963	June 8, 1969
15	Michael Joseph Roche	N.D. Cal.	August 21, 1935	August 23, 1935	August 24, 1935	March 1, 1958	July 1, 1964
16	John Donelson Martin Sr.	W.D. Tenn.	April 22, 1935	April 30, 1935	May 3, 1935	September 16, 1940	Elevated
17	George Moore	E.D. Mo.	May 20, 1935	May 28, 1935	May 29, 1935	January 19, 1962	November 5, 1962
18	James H. Baldwin	D. Mont.	May 20, 1935	May 29, 1935	June 4, 1935	October 26, 1944	–
19	John Christopher Mahoney	D.R.I.	May 24, 1935	June 4, 1935	June 7, 1935	February 21, 1940	Elevated
20	Elwood Hamilton	W.D. Ky.	June 14, 1935	June 18, 1935	June 20, 1935	April 1, 1938	Elevated
21	Albert Lee Stephens Sr.	S.D. Cal.	August 21, 1935	August 23, 1935	August 24, 1935	June 21, 1937	Elevated
22	George Clinton Sweeney	D. Mass.	August 20, 1935	August 21, 1935	August 24, 1935	September 30, 1966	November 5, 1966
23	Leon Rene Yankwich	S.D. Cal. / C.D. Cal.	August 21, 1935	August 23, 1935	August 24, 1935	April 28, 1964	February 9, 1975
24	David Jackson Davis	N.D. Ala.	January 6, 1936	January 22, 1936	December 10, 1935	December 7, 1938	–
25	Thomas Whitfield Davidson	N.D. Tex.	January 22, 1936	January 30, 1936	February 5, 1936	November 1, 1965	January 26, 1974
26	Mell G. Underwood	S.D. Ohio	January 27, 1936	February 4, 1936	February 12, 1936	December 31, 1965	March 8, 1972
27	Matthew T. Abruzzo	E.D.N.Y.	February 3, 1936	February 12, 1936	February 15, 1936	February 15, 1966	May 28, 1971
28	Robert Nelson Pollard	E.D. Va.	February 20, 1936	February 27, 1936	February 27, 1936	April 22, 1947	May 24, 1954
29	Arthur F. Lederle	E.D. Mich.	February 20, 1936	March 3, 1936	March 6, 1936	July 1, 1960	April 29, 1972
30	John W. Holland	S.D. Fla.	May 26, 1936	May 30, 1936	June 1, 1936	July 1, 1955	November 14, 1969
31	David W. Ling	D. Ariz.	May 28, 1936	May 30, 1936	June 3, 1936	October 11, 1964	May 17, 1965
32	Vincent L. Leibell	S.D.N.Y.	June 8, 1936	June 18, 1936	June 20, 1936	January 1, 1954	September 22, 1968
33	John William Clancy	S.D.N.Y.	June 15, 1936	June 20, 1936	June 22, 1936	April 3, 1959	March 2, 1969
34	Samuel Mandelbaum	S.D.N.Y.	June 15, 1936	June 20, 1936	June 22, 1936	November 20, 1946	–
35	Albert Branson Maris	E.D. Pa.	June 18, 1936	June 20, 1936	June 22, 1936	June 27, 1938	Elevated
36	Charles Cecil Wyche	W.D.S.C. / D.S.C	January 11, 1937	January 22, 1937	January 30, 1937	September 17, 1966	–
37	Sidney Carr Mize	S.D. Miss.	January 30, 1937	February 2, 1937	February 3, 1937	April 26, 1965	–
38	Alfred P. Murrah	E.D. Okla. N.D. Okla. W.D. Okla.	February 8, 1937	February 25, 1937	March 3, 1937	September 9, 1940	Elevated
39	Harry Evans Watkins	N.D. W. Va. S.D. W. Va.	February 17, 1937	March 2, 1937	March 3, 1937	June 6, 1963	–
40	John Caskie Collet	E.D. Mo. W.D. Mo.	March 9, 1937	March 15, 1937	March 20, 1937	July 11, 1947	Elevated
41	J. Leroy Adair	S.D. Ill.	March 24, 1937	April 20, 1937	April 27, 1937	January 19, 1956	–
42	Harold P. Burke	W.D.N.Y.	April 27, 1937	June 15, 1937	June 18, 1937	June 15, 1981	July 17, 1981
43	Thomas Clark Trimble III	E.D. Ark.	June 17, 1937	June 18, 1937	June 18, 1937	January 14, 1957	July 6, 1965
44	Ralph E. Jenney	S.D. Cal.	June 23, 1937	June 29, 1937	July 3, 1937	July 13, 1945	–
45	Eugene Rice	E.D. Okla.	August 3, 1937	August 10, 1937	August 11, 1937	December 1, 1963	November 24, 1967
46	Frank Le Blond Kloeb	N.D. Ohio	June 18, 1937	June 22, 1937	August 20, 1937	September 30, 1964	March 11, 1976
47	Claude C. McColloch	D. Ore.	August 5, 1937	August 17, 1937	August 20, 1937	December 31, 1958	September 30, 1959
48	George F. Sullivan	D. Minn.	August 12, 1937	August 17, 1937	August 20, 1937	April 14, 1944	–
49	Mac Swinford	E.D. Ky. W.D. Ky.	August 19, 1937	August 20, 1937	August 21, 1937	February 3, 1975	–
50	John H. Druffel	S.D. Ohio	November 16, 1937	December 8, 1937	September 22, 1937	September 30, 1961	May 16, 1967
51	Thomas Alexander Murphree	N.D. Ala.	May 12, 1938	May 17, 1938	May 31, 1938	September 5, 1945	–
52	Edward Augustus Conger	S.D.N.Y.	June 10, 1938	June 16, 1938	June 24, 1938	October 20, 1954	August 7, 1963
53	Francis Ford	D. Mass.	June 9, 1938	June 15, 1938	June 24, 1938	July 1, 1972	May 26, 1975
54	Bolitha James Laws	D.D.C.	June 10, 1938	June 16, 1938	June 24, 1938	February 23, 1945	Elevated
54.1	Bolitha James Laws	D.D.C.	January 19, 1945	February 22, 1945	February 23, 1945	November 14, 1958	–
55	Harry Ellis Kalodner	E.D. Pa.	January 5, 1939	March 20, 1939	July 6, 1938	September 3, 1946	Elevated
56	Floyd H. Roberts	W.D. Va.	January 5, 1939	–	July 6, 1938	February 6, 1939	–
57	Michael L. Igoe	N.D. Ill.	January 5, 1939	February 9, 1939	November 21, 1938	August 31, 1965	August 21, 1967
58	Gaston Louis Noel Porterie	W.D. La.	January 24, 1939 (Note: Originally incorrectly nominated on January 24, 1939 to the nonexistent Northern District of Louisiana. Withdrawn and correctly nominated to the Western District of Louisiana on January 25, 1939.)	February 1, 1939	February 9, 1939	March 24, 1953	–
59	James V. Allred	S.D. Tex.	January 5, 1939	February 16, 1939	February 23, 1939	May 15, 1942	–
60	Thomas Alan Goldsborough	D.D.C.	January 20, 1939	February 16, 1939	February 23, 1939	June 16, 1951	–
61	Frank Albert Picard	E.D. Mich.	February 9, 1939	February 16, 1939	February 23, 1939	March 31, 1959	February 28, 1963
62	Shackelford Miller Jr.	W.D. Ky.	February 16, 1939	February 20, 1939	March 4, 1939	December 20, 1945	Elevated
63	Harry Jacob Lemley	E.D. Ark. W.D. Ark.	April 27, 1939	May 8, 1939	May 11, 1939	September 5, 1958	March 5, 1965
64	Leslie Rogers Darr	E.D. Tenn. M.D. Tenn.	May 17, 1939 (Note: Nomination withdrawn on May 24, 1939 and renominated on the same day.)	May 31, 1939	June 2, 1939	March 15, 1961; November 27, 1940	May 29, 1967 –
65	Armistead Mason Dobie	W.D. Va.	May 16, 1939	May 25, 1939	June 2, 1939	February 8, 1940	Elevated
66	Robert Nugen Wilkin	N.D. Ohio	May 19, 1939	June 1, 1939	June 3, 1939	August 31, 1949	February 23, 1973
67	James Ward Morris	D.D.C.	May 23, 1939	June 15, 1939	June 19, 1939	November 15, 1960	–
68	F. Ryan Duffy	E.D. Wis.	June 21, 1939	June 26, 1939	June 29, 1939	February 2, 1949	Elevated
69	Elmer David Davies	M.D. Tenn.	June 19, 1939	July 12, 1939	July 12, 1939	January 7, 1957	–
70	Martin Ignatius Welsh	N.D. Cal.	June 21, 1939	July 11, 1939	July 14, 1939	January 1, 1947	January 4, 1953
71	Alva M. Lumpkin	E.D.S.C. W.D.S.C.	May 17, 1939	May 22, 1939	July 19, 1939	July 22, 1941	–
72	Campbell E. Beaumont	S.D. Cal.	July 27, 1939	August 1, 1939	August 5, 1939	November 19, 1954	–
73	Lloyd Llewellyn Black	W.D. Wash.	August 2, 1939	August 4, 1939	August 11, 1939	August 23, 1950	–
74	Alfred D. Barksdale	W.D. Va.	January 11, 1940	February 1, 1940	December 19, 1939	August 1, 1957	August 16, 1972
75	Guy K. Bard	E.D. Pa.	April 4, 1940	April 24, 1940	December 20, 1939	July 16, 1952	–
76	Thomas Glynn Walker	D.N.J.	January 16, 1940	March 5, 1940	December 20, 1939	December 31, 1941	–
77	William J. Barker	S.D. Fla.	January 11, 1940	February 1, 1940	February 5, 1940	April 30, 1959	April 13, 1968
78	John Patrick Hartigan	D.R.I.	January 11, 1940	February 1, 1940	February 12, 1940	January 13, 1951	Elevated
79	David Andrew Pine	D.D.C.	March 15, 1940	March 20, 1940	March 29, 1940	April 2, 1965	June 11, 1970
80	Adrian Joseph Caillouet	E.D. La.	April 2, 1940	April 9, 1940	April 23, 1940	December 19, 1946	–
81	James Patrick Leamy	D. Vt.	April 12, 1940	April 30, 1940	May 7, 1940	July 22, 1949	–
82	James Cullen Ganey	E.D. Pa.	June 11, 1940	June 13, 1940	June 19, 1940	August 30, 1961	Elevated
83	Curtis L. Waller	N.D. Fla. S.D. Fla.	June 11, 1940	June 15, 1940	June 19, 1940	March 12, 1943	Elevated
84	Benjamin Harrison	S.D. Cal.	June 11, 1940	June 22, 1940	June 26, 1940	August 13, 1960	–
85	Robert Lee Russell	N.D. Ga.	August 5, 1940	August 8, 1940	August 15, 1940	October 26, 1949	Elevated
86	Marion Speed Boyd	W.D. Tenn.	September 13, 1940	September 18, 1940	September 27, 1940	August 1, 1966	January 9, 1988
87	James Francis Thaddeus O'Connor	S.D. Cal.	August 28, 1940	September 19, 1940	September 27, 1940	September 28, 1949	–
88	Bower Slack Broaddus	E.D. Okla. N.D. Okla. W.D. Okla.	September 24, 1940	September 27, 1940	October 1, 1940	December 10, 1949	–
89	Royce H. Savage	N.D. Okla.	September 24, 1940	September 27, 1940	October 1, 1940	October 31, 1961	–
90	William Joseph Campbell	N.D. Ill.	September 24, 1940	October 7, 1940	October 10, 1940	March 19, 1970	October 19, 1988
91	Lewis B. Schwellenbach	E.D. Wash.	May 6, 1940	May 6, 1940	November 20, 1940	June 30, 1945	–
92	William Francis Smith	D.N.J.	January 23, 1941	February 13, 1941	February 15, 1941	September 12, 1961	Elevated
93	John E. Miller	W.D. Ark.	January 31, 1941	January 31, 1941	March 12, 1941	February 28, 1967	January 30, 1981
94	Ben Moore	S.D. W. Va.	March 1, 1941	March 20, 1941	March 27, 1941	September 25, 1958	–
95	John Bright	S.D.N.Y.	April 25, 1941	June 3, 1941	June 6, 1941	March 24, 1948	–
96	Simon H. Rifkind	S.D.N.Y.	April 25, 1941	June 3, 1941	June 6, 1941	May 24, 1950	–
97	Matthew Francis McGuire	D.D.C.	July 14, 1941	July 29, 1941	August 1, 1941	October 7, 1966	January 24, 1986
98	Emerich B. Freed	N.D. Ohio	September 11, 1941	October 2, 1941	October 7, 1941	December 4, 1955	–
99	Archibald Battle Lovett	S.D. Ga.	September 8, 1941	October 2, 1941	October 7, 1941	December 28, 1945	–
100	J. Joseph Smith	D. Conn.	October 16, 1941	October 28, 1941	October 30, 1941	September 13, 1960	Elevated
101	Charles Joseph Vogel	D.N.D.	July 15, 1941	October 27, 1941	October 30, 1941	August 20, 1954	Elevated
102	Arthur Daniel Healey	D. Mass.	December 1, 1941	December 16, 1941	December 19, 1941	September 16, 1948	–
103	Charles Edward Wyzanski Jr.	D. Mass.	December 1, 1941	December 16, 1941	December 19, 1941	September 1, 1971	September 3, 1986
104	Paul Conway Leahy	D. Del.	December 23, 1941	January 7, 1942	January 14, 1942	October 7, 1957	July 3, 1966
105	Edward C. Eicher	D.D.C.	December 30, 1941	January 20, 1942	January 23, 1942	November 30, 1944	–
106	George Bell Timmerman Sr.	E.D.S.C. W.D.S.C.	December 18, 1941	January 20, 1942	January 23, 1942	October 10, 1962	April 22, 1966
107	Julius Waties Waring	E.D.S.C.	December 18, 1941	January 20, 1942	January 23, 1942	February 15, 1952	January 11, 1968
108	Walter Angus Keeling	W.D. Tex.	January 16, 1942	January 26, 1942	January 28, 1942	January 22, 1945	–
109	John Wayne Delehant	D. Neb.	January 19, 1942	February 9, 1942	February 13, 1942	April 30, 1957	April 20, 1972
110	Charles H. Leavy	W.D. Wash.	October 23, 1941	February 18, 1942	February 25, 1942	August 31, 1952	September 25, 1952
111	Stephen W. Brennan	N.D.N.Y.	March 31, 1942	April 28, 1942	May 6, 1942	May 1, 1963	April 9, 1968
112	Peirson Mitchell Hall	S.D. Cal. / C.D. Cal.	February 17, 1942	June 30, 1942	July 3, 1942	September 30, 1968	December 8, 1979
113	Thomas Francis Meaney	D.N.J.	May 4, 1942	July 1, 1942	July 3, 1942	May 1, 1966	May 17, 1968
114	Allen Burroughs Hannay	S.D. Tex.	July 16, 1942	August 6, 1942	August 12, 1942	August 6, 1975	October 22, 1983
115	Louis Earl Goodman	N.D. Cal.	November 9, 1942	December 15, 1942	December 24, 1942	September 15, 1961	–
116	Chase A. Clark	D. Idaho	February 18, 1943	March 5, 1943	March 10, 1943	April 30, 1964	December 30, 1966
117	Clarence H. Mullins	N.D. Ala.	March 19, 1943	April 7, 1943	April 16, 1943	May 31, 1953	June 30, 1957
118	Dozier A. DeVane	N.D. Fla. S.D. Fla.	March 26, 1943	April 14, 1943	April 22, 1943	January 31, 1958; October 1, 1947	December 15, 1963 –
119	Stephen Sanders Chandler Jr.	W.D. Okla.	December 11, 1942 (Note: Renominated on February 1, 1943.)	May 10, 1943	May 13, 1943	October 20, 1975	April 27, 1989
120	Richard M. Duncan	E.D. Mo. W.D. Mo.	July 8, 1943	July 8, 1943	July 14, 1943	May 31, 1965	August 1, 1974
121	Rubey Mosley Hulen	E.D. Mo.	July 8, 1943	July 8, 1943	July 14, 1943	July 7, 1956	–
122	Guy T. Helvering	D. Kan.	September 14, 1943	September 28, 1943	October 11, 1943	July 4, 1946	–
123	Luther Merritt Swygert	N.D. Ind.	September 29, 1943	October 14, 1943	October 16, 1943	October 10, 1961	Elevated
124	Charles Sterling Hutcheson	E.D. Va.	January 19, 1944	February 8, 1944	February 10, 1944	September 1, 1959	October 24, 1969
125	Henry Norman Graven	N.D. Iowa	March 3, 1944	March 21, 1944	March 24, 1944	August 31, 1961	February 1, 1970
126	Walter J. LaBuy	N.D. Ill.	March 7, 1944	March 29, 1944	March 31, 1944	January 31, 1961	September 29, 1967
127	Elwyn R. Shaw	N.D. Ill.	March 7, 1944	May 3, 1944	May 9, 1944	July 18, 1950	–
128	Harold Maurice Kennedy	E.D.N.Y.	September 1, 1944	September 20, 1944	September 22, 1944	September 30, 1952	–
129	Aloysius Joseph Connor	D.N.H.	November 16, 1944	December 5, 1944	December 9, 1944	December 18, 1967	–
130	Henry Albert Schweinhaut	D.D.C.	November 21, 1944	December 13, 1944	December 19, 1944	November 16, 1956	June 22, 1970
131	Thomas Hoyt Davis	M.D. Ga.	January 3, 1945	January 29, 1945	January 30, 1945	June 30, 1961	May 19, 1969
132	Robert Lewis Brown Sr.	D. Mont.	March 12, 1945	March 27, 1945	April 7, 1945	April 2, 1948	–
133	Albert Alphonso Ridge	W.D. Mo.	March 12, 1945	April 3, 1945	April 7, 1945	June 29, 1961	Elevated

== Specialty courts (Article I) ==
=== United States Court of Customs and Patent Appeals ===
#	Judge	Nomination date	Confirmation date	Began active service	Ended active service	Ended senior status
1	Finis J. Garrett	November 16, 1937	November 30, 1937	December 1, 1937	September 15, 1955	–
2	Joseph Raymond Jackson	November 29, 1937	December 9, 1937	December 14, 1937	April 1, 1952	August 29, 1969
3	Ambrose O'Connell	May 19, 1944	June 6, 1944	June 10, 1944	April 10, 1962	October 12, 1962

=== United States Court of Claims ===
#	Judge	Nomination date	Confirmation date	Began active service	Ended active service	Ended senior status
1	Richard S. Whaley	June 23, 1939	June 26, 1939	June 27, 1939	July 9, 1947	November 8, 1951
2	Samuel Estill Whitaker	June 23, 1939	July 11, 1939	July 13, 1939	July 19, 1964	March 26, 1967
3	John Marvin Jones	April 9, 1940	April 10, 1940	November 20, 1940	July 9, 1947	–
4	J. Warren Madden	November 15, 1940	January 2, 1941	January 7, 1941	August 15, 1961	February 17, 1972

=== United States Customs Court ===
#	Judge	Nomination date	Confirmation date	Began active service	Ended active service	Ended senior status
1	William John Keefe	June 8, 1933	June 10, 1933	June 13, 1933	January 15, 1947	–
2	Thomas Joseph Walker	June 11, 1940	June 15, 1940	June 20, 1940	January 18, 1945	–
3	Webster Oliver	June 11, 1940	June 18, 1940	June 24, 1940	June 24, 1967	November 16, 1969
4	William A. Ekwall	January 19, 1942	February 9, 1942	February 13, 1942	October 16, 1956	–
5	William Purington Cole Jr.	May 11, 1942	May 11, 1942	May 14, 1942	July 9, 1952	–
6	Charles Drummond Lawrence	December 11, 1942	February 18, 1943	February 22, 1943	March 31, 1965	February 12, 1975

== Notes ==
Renominations

== Sources ==
- Federal Judicial Center
