= List of federal judges appointed by Andrew Johnson =

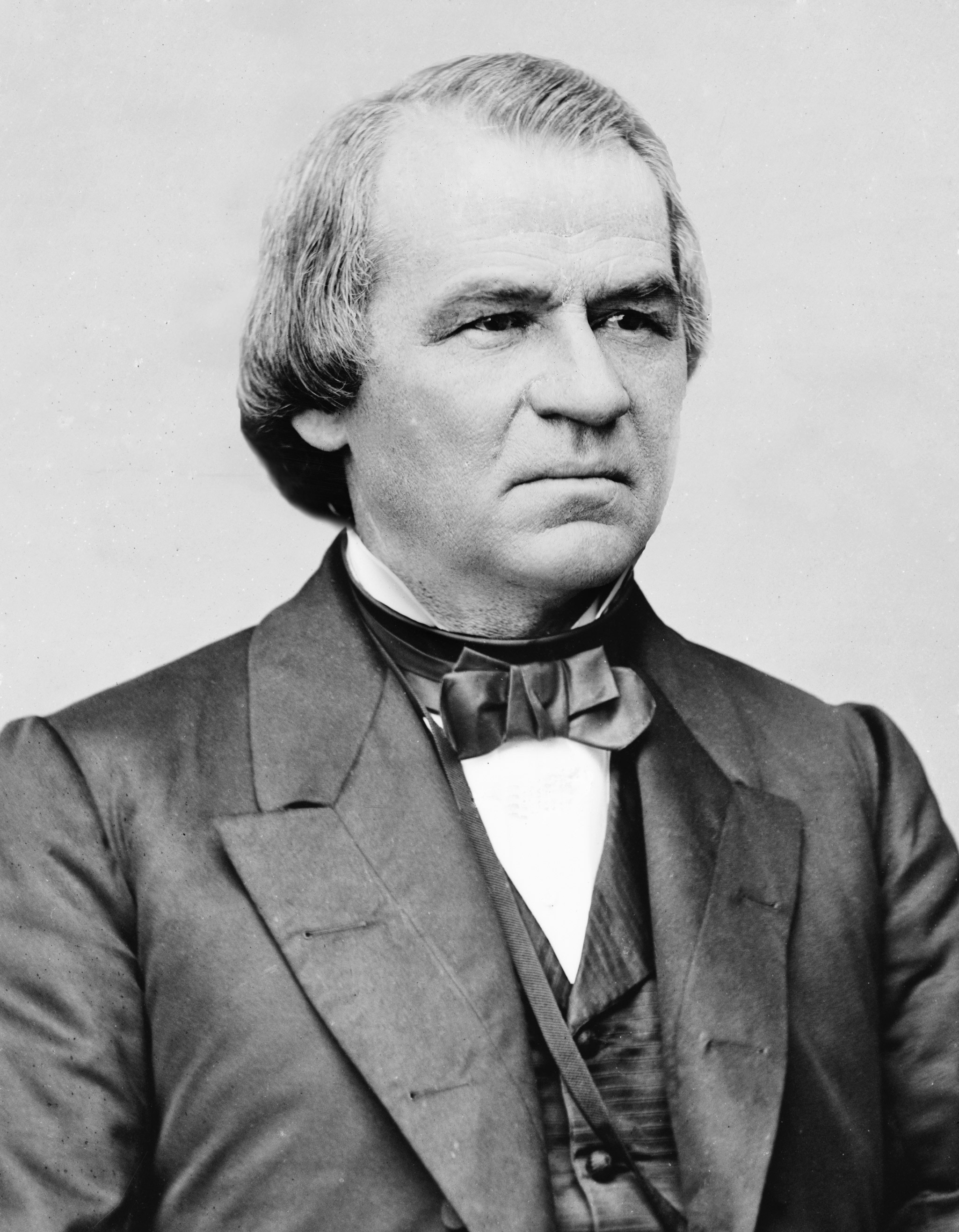
President Andrew Johnson.

Following is a list of all Article III United States federal judges appointed by President Andrew Johnson during his presidency. Johnson appointed only 9 Article III federal judges during his presidency, all to United States district courts. Andrew Johnson is one of only four presidents who did not have an opportunity to appoint a judge to serve on the Supreme Court. In April 1866 he nominated Henry Stanbery to fill the vacancy left with the death of John Catron, but the Republican Congress eliminated the seat with the passage of the Judicial Circuits Act. One of Johnson's district court appointees, Samuel Blatchford, would later be appointed to the Supreme Court by Chester A. Arthur.

Johnson appointed 1 judge to the United States Court of Claims, an Article I tribunal.

== District Courts ==
#	Judge	Court (Note: See List of United States district and territorial courts)	Nomination date	Confirmation date	Began active service	Ended active service
1	John Erskine	N.D. Ga. S.D. Ga.	December 20, 1865	January 22, 1866	July 10, 1865	April 25, 1882; December 1, 1883
2	George Washington Brooks	D.N.C.	December 20, 1865	January 22, 1866	August 19, 1865	June 4, 1872
3	George Seabrook Bryan	D.S.C.	February 9, 1866	March 12, 1866	March 12, 1866	September 1, 1886
4	Robert Andrews Hill	N.D. Miss. S.D. Miss.	March 27, 1866	May 1, 1866	May 1, 1866	August 1, 1891
5	Edward Fox	D. Me.	May 28, 1866	May 30, 1866	May 31, 1866	December 14, 1881
6	Daniel Clark	D.N.H.	July 27, 1866	July 27, 1866	July 27, 1866	January 2, 1891
7	Charles Taylor Sherman	N.D. Ohio	March 2, 1867	March 2, 1867	March 2, 1867	November 25, 1872
8	Samuel Blatchford	S.D.N.Y.	July 13, 1867	July 16, 1867	May 3, 1867	March 4, 1878
9	Elmer Scipio Dundy	D. Neb.	April 4, 1868	April 9, 1868	April 9, 1868	October 28, 1896

== Specialty courts (Article I) ==
=== United States Court of Claims ===
#	Judge	Nomination date	Confirmation date	Began active service	Ended active service
1	Samuel Milligan	July 23, 1868	July 25, 1868	July 25, 1868	April 20, 1874

== Sources ==
- Federal Judicial Center
