= Joseph William Woodrough =

American judge (1873–1977)

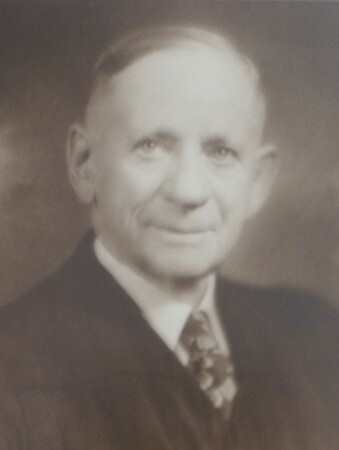

Senior Judge of the United States Court of Appeals for the Eighth Circuit
- In office January 3, 1961 – October 2, 1977

Judge of the United States Court of Appeals for the Eighth Circuit
- In office April 12, 1933 – January 3, 1961
- Appointed by: Franklin D. Roosevelt
- Preceded by: Arba Seymour Van Valkenburgh
- Succeeded by: Pat Mehaffy

Judge of the United States District Court for the District of Nebraska
- In office April 3, 1916 – April 12, 1933
- Appointed by: Woodrow Wilson
- Preceded by: William Henry Munger
- Succeeded by: James A. Donohoe

Personal details
- Born: Joseph William Woodrough; August 29, 1873 Cincinnati, Ohio, U.S.
- Died: October 2, 1977 (aged 104) Omaha, Nebraska, U.S.
- Education: Heidelberg University

Joseph William Woodrough (August 29, 1873 – October 2, 1977) was a United States circuit judge of the United States Court of Appeals for the Eighth Circuit and previously was a United States district judge of the United States District Court for the District of Nebraska. By total service, Woodrough is the longest-serving federal judge in history, with a total service tenure of 61 years, although by active service he is only the twelfth-longest-serving at 44 years and 275 days.

== Education and career ==
Born on August 29, 1873, in Cincinnati, Ohio, Woodrough studied at Heidelberg University in the German Empire and then read law in 1893. He was a Judge of the Ward County Court in Texas from 1894 to 1896. He was the County Attorney of Ward County in 1897. He was in private practice in Omaha, Nebraska, from 1898 to 1916.

== Federal judicial service ==
Woodrough was nominated by President Woodrow Wilson on March 13, 1916, to a seat on the United States District Court for the District of Nebraska vacated by Judge William Henry Munger. He was confirmed by the United States Senate on March 31, 1916, and received his commission on April 3, 1916. His service terminated on April 12, 1933, due to his elevation to the Eighth Circuit.

Woodrough was nominated by President Franklin D. Roosevelt on April 3, 1933, to a seat on the United States Court of Appeals for the Eighth Circuit vacated by Judge Arba Seymour Van Valkenburg. He was confirmed by the Senate on April 12, 1933, and received his commission on April 12, 1933. He assumed senior status on January 3, 1961. He heard no cases in this capacity. He died on October 2, 1977, at the age of 104.

== See also ==
- Wesley E. Brown
- List of United States federal judges by longevity of service

== Sources ==
Legal offices
Preceded by William Henry Munger	Judge of the United States District Court for the District of Nebraska; 1916–1933	Succeeded by James A. Donohoe
Preceded by Arba Seymour Van Valkenburgh	Judge of the United States Court of Appeals for the Eighth Circuit; 1933–1961	Succeeded by Pat Mehaffy
