= Warren Keith Urbom =

American judge

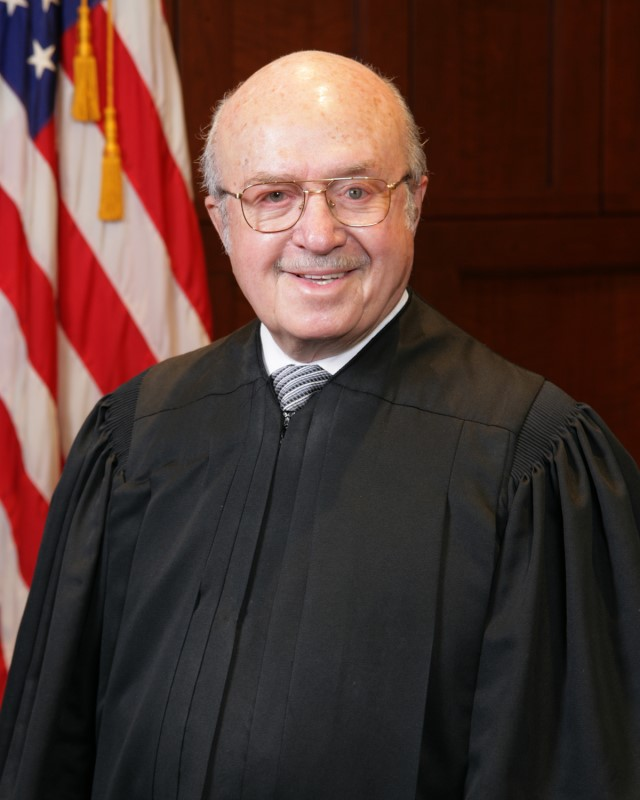

Senior Judge of the United States District Court for the District of Nebraska
- In office December 31, 1990 – July 28, 2017

Chief Judge of the United States District Court for the District of Nebraska
- In office 1972–1986
- Preceded by: Richard Earl Robinson
- Succeeded by: C. Arlen Beam

Judge of the United States District Court for the District of Nebraska
- In office April 24, 1970 – December 31, 1990
- Appointed by: Richard Nixon
- Preceded by: Robert Van Pelt
- Succeeded by: Richard G. Kopf

Personal details
- Born: December 17, 1925 Atlanta, Nebraska, U.S.
- Died: July 28, 2017 (aged 91) Lincoln, Nebraska, U.S.
- Education: Nebraska Wesleyan University (AB); University of Michigan (JD)

Warren Keith Urbom (December 17, 1925 – July 28, 2017) was a United States district judge of the United States District Court for the District of Nebraska.

== Education and career ==
Born in Atlanta, Nebraska, Urbom was a Technical Sergeant in the United States Army during World War II, from 1944 to 1946. He received an Artium Baccalaureus from Nebraska Wesleyan University in 1950 and a Juris Doctor from the University of Michigan Law School in 1953. He was in private practice in Lincoln, Nebraska from 1953 to 1970.

=== Federal judicial service ===
On March 11, 1970, Urbom was nominated by President Richard Nixon to a seat on the United States District Court for the District of Nebraska vacated by Robert Van Pelt. Urbom was confirmed by the United States Senate on April 23, 1970, and received his commission on April 24, 1970. He served as chief judge from 1972 to 1986. He was also an adjunct instructor at the University of Nebraska College of Law from 1979 to 1990. He assumed senior status on December 31, 1990.

== Later life and death ==
Urbom assumed inactive status on April 25, 2014, meaning that while he remained a Federal Judge, he no longer actively heard cases or participated in court business. Urbom died in Lincoln, Nebraska on July 28, 2017, at the age of 91.

== See also ==
- List of United States federal judges by longevity of service

== Sources ==
Legal offices
Preceded by Robert Van Pelt	Judge of the United States District Court for the District of Nebraska; 1970–1990	Succeeded by Richard G. Kopf
Preceded by Richard Earl Robinson	Chief Judge of the United States District Court for the District of Nebraska; 1972–1986	Succeeded by C. Arlen Beam
