= William Henry Munger =

American judge

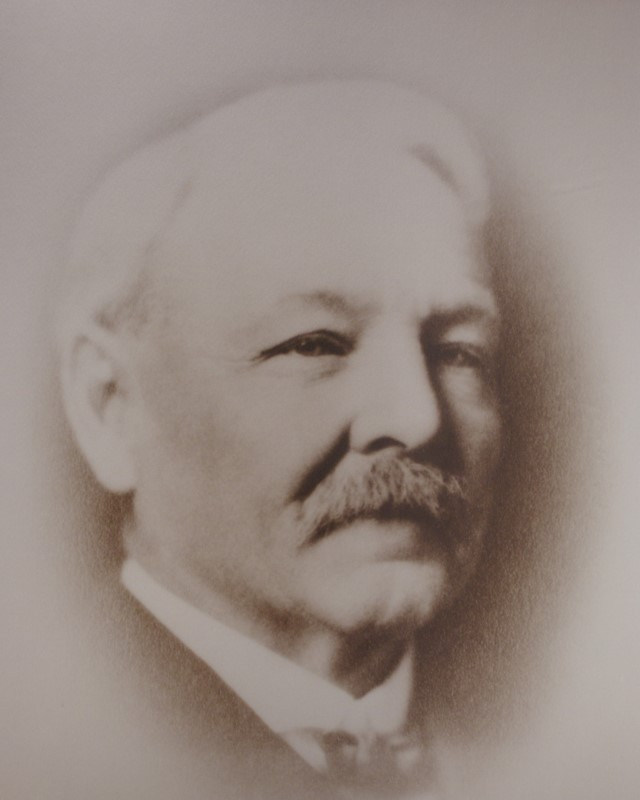

Judge of the United States District Court for the District of Nebraska
- In office February 18, 1897 – August 11, 1915
- Appointed by: Grover Cleveland
- Preceded by: William Douglas McHugh
- Succeeded by: Joseph William Woodrough

Personal details
- Born: William Henry Munger; October 12, 1845 Bergen, New York
- Died: August 11, 1915 (aged 69) Omaha, Nebraska
- Education: read law

William Henry Munger (October 12, 1845 – August 11, 1915) was a United States district judge of the United States District Court for the District of Nebraska.

== Education and career ==
Born in Bergen, New York, Munger read law in 1868. He was in private practice in Fremont, Nebraska from 1869 to 1878, in Omaha, Nebraska from 1878 to 1879, returning to Fremont from 1879 to 1897.

== Federal judicial service ==
On February 1, 1897, Munger was nominated by President Grover Cleveland to a seat on the United States District Court for the District of Nebraska vacated by Judge William Douglas McHugh. Munger was confirmed by the United States Senate on February 18, 1897, and received his commission the same day, serving thereafter until his death on August 11, 1915, in Omaha.

== Sources ==
Legal offices
Preceded by William Douglas McHugh	Judge of the United States District Court for the District of Nebraska; 1897–1915	Succeeded by Joseph William Woodrough
