= Thomas Charles Munger =

American judge (1861–1941)

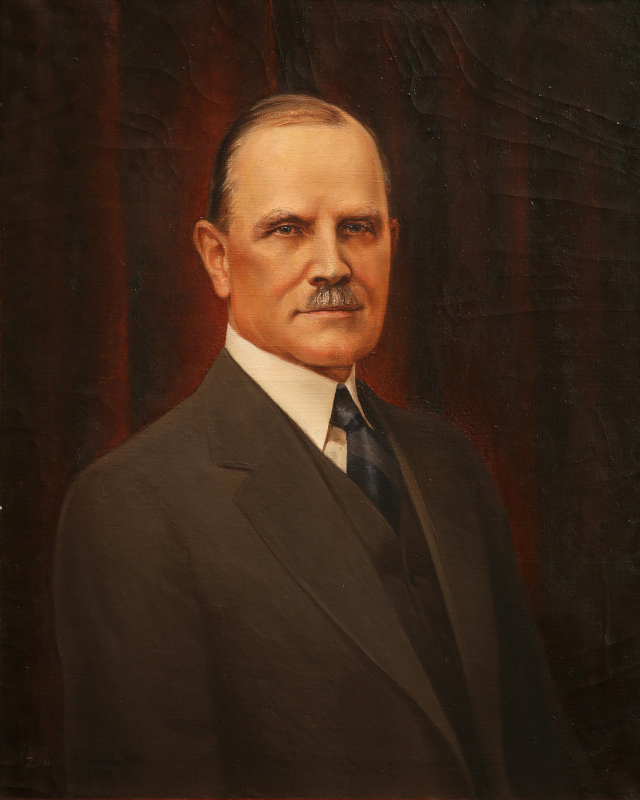

Senior Judge of the United States District Court for the District of Nebraska
- In office July 31, 1941 – November 29, 1941

Judge of the United States District Court for the District of Nebraska
- In office March 1, 1907 – July 31, 1941
- Appointed by: Theodore Roosevelt
- Preceded by: Seat established by 34 Stat. 997
- Succeeded by: John Wayne Delehant

Member of the Nebraska House of Representatives
- In office 1895–1897

Personal details
- Born: Thomas Charles Munger; July 7, 1861 Fletcher, Ohio, U.S.
- Died: November 29, 1941 (aged 80) Lincoln, Nebraska, U.S.
- Relatives: Charlie Munger (grandson)
- Education: Grinnell College; Northwestern University read law

Thomas Charles Munger (July 7, 1861 – November 29, 1941) was a United States district judge of the United States District Court for the District of Nebraska, and grandfather of investor and businessman Charlie Munger.

== Education and career ==
Born in Fletcher, Ohio, Munger attended Grinnell College and Northwestern University, then read law to enter the bar in 1885. He was a private practice in Benkelman, Nebraska and county attorney for Dundy County, Nebraska from 1885 to 1886. He continued private practice in Lincoln, Nebraska from 1886 to 1907. He was a member of the Nebraska House of Representatives from 1895 to 1897. He served as county attorney of Lancaster County, Nebraska from 1897 to 1901.

== Federal judicial service ==
On February 27, 1907, Munger was nominated by President Theodore Roosevelt to a new seat on the United States District Court for the District of Nebraska created by 34 Stat. 997. He was confirmed by the United States Senate on March 1, 1907, and received his commission the same day. He assumed senior status on July 31, 1941, serving in that capacity until his death on November 29, 1941, in Lincoln. Having served for over 34 years, Munger was Roosevelt's longest-serving judicial appointee and the last in active service.

== See also ==
- List of United States federal judges by longevity of service

== Sources ==
Legal offices
Preceded by Seat established by 34 Stat. 997	Judge of the United States District Court for the District of Nebraska; 1907–1941	Succeeded by John Wayne Delehant
