= William Douglas McHugh =

American judge

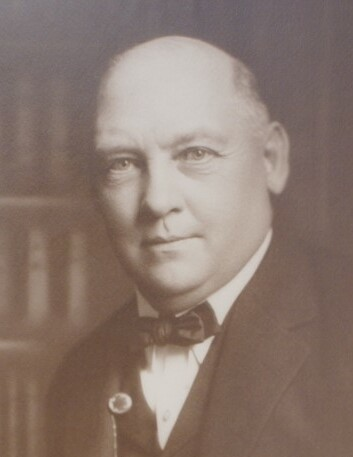

Judge of the United States District Court for the District of Nebraska
- In office November 20, 1896 – March 3, 1897
- Appointed by: Grover Cleveland
- Preceded by: Elmer Scipio Dundy
- Succeeded by: William Henry Munger

Personal details
- Born: William Douglas McHugh; September 10, 1859 Galena, Illinois
- Died: December 26, 1923 (aged 64) Chicago, Illinois
- Education: read law

William Douglas McHugh (September 10, 1859 – December 26, 1923) was a United States district judge of the United States District Court for the District of Nebraska.

== Education and career ==
Born in Galena, Illinois, McHugh read law in 1883 and was in private practice in Galena from 1883 to 1888, and in Omaha, Nebraska from 1888 to 1896.

== Federal judicial service ==
McHugh received a recess appointment from President Grover Cleveland on November 20, 1896, to a seat on the United States District Court for the District of Nebraska vacated by Judge Elmer Scipio Dundy. He was nominated to the same position by President Cleveland on December 8, 1896, who subsequently withdrew the nomination on February 1, 1897. McHugh's service terminated on March 3, 1897, with the sine die adjournment of the United States Senate of the 54th United States Congress and the end of Cleveland's Presidency.

== Later career and death ==
Following his departure from the federal bench, McHugh resumed private practice in Omaha from 1897 to 1920. He was general counsel to the International Harvester Corporation in Chicago, Illinois from 1920 to 1923. He died on December 26, 1923, in Chicago.

== Sources ==
Legal offices
| Preceded by Elmer Scipio Dundy | Judge of the United States District Court for the District of Nebraska; 1896–1897 | Succeeded by William Henry Munger |
