= List of elections in 1962 =

The following elections occurred in 1962.

== Africa ==
- Algerian independence referendum
- 1962 Algerian Constituent Assembly election and referendum
- 1962 Chadian parliamentary election
- Gambian legislative election
- 1962 Moroccan constitutional referendum
- Northern Rhodesian general election
- Southern Rhodesian general election
- Federation of Rhodesia and Nyasaland election
- Sierra Leonean general election
- presidential election in Tanganyika (later Tanzania)
- 1962 Ugandan general election

== Asia ==
- 1962 Bruneian general election
- 1962 Cambodian general election
- 1962 Israeli presidential election
- 1962 Malayan local elections
- 1962 North Korean parliamentary election
- 1962 Singaporean national referendum
- 1962 Japanese House of Councillors election
- 1962 Jordanian general election
- 1962 Pakistani general election
- 1962 South Korean constitutional referendum
- 1962 Soviet Union legislative election

=== India ===
- 1962 Indian general election
- Indian general election in Andhra Pradesh, 1962
- Indian general election in Madras, 1962
- 1962 Indian presidential election
- 1962 Indian vice presidential election
- 1962 Madras State legislative assembly election
- 1962 West Bengal state assembly election

== Europe ==
- 1962 Albanian parliamentary election
- 1962 Austrian legislative election
- 1962 Bulgarian parliamentary election
- 1962 Danish local elections
- 1962 Faroese general election
- 1962 Finnish parliamentary election
- 1962 Finnish presidential election
- 1962 Italian presidential election
- 1962 Liechtenstein general election
- 1962 Liechtenstein referendum
- 1962 Maltese general election
- 1962 Soviet Union legislative election
- 1962 Swiss referendums

=== Austria ===
- 1962 Austrian legislative election

=== France ===
- 1962 French legislative election
- 1962 French presidential election referendum
- 1962 French Évian Accords referendum

=== United Kingdom ===
- 1962 Blackpool North by-election
- 1962 Central Norfolk by-election
- 1962 Chippenham by-election
- 1962 Derby North by-election
- 1962 Glasgow Woodside by-election
- 1962 Leicester North East by-election
- 1962 Lincoln by-election
- 1962 Middlesbrough East by-election
- 1962 Middlesbrough West by-election
- 1962 Montgomeryshire by-election
- 1962 Orpington by-election
- 1962 Pontefract by-election
- 1962 South Dorset by-election
- 1962 South Northamptonshire by-election
- 1962 Stockton-on-Tees by-election
- 1962 West Derbyshire by-election
- 1962 West Lothian by-election
- 1962 United Kingdom local elections

==== United Kingdom local ====
===== English local =====
- 1962 Bermondsey Borough election
- 1962 Southwark Borough election

== North America ==
=== Canada ===
- 1962 Canadian federal election
- 1962 Edmonton municipal election
- 1962 Manitoba general election
- 1962 Newfoundland general election
- 1962 Ottawa municipal election
- 1962 Prince Edward Island general election
- 1962 Quebec general election
- 1962 Toronto municipal election

=== Caribbean ===
- 1962 Dominican Republic general election
- 1962 Jamaican general election
- 1962 Netherlands Antilles general election

=== United States ===
- 1962 United States elections

==== United States lieutenant gubernatorial ====
- 1962 California lieutenant gubernatorial election
- 1962 Georgia lieutenant gubernatorial election
- 1962 Idaho lieutenant gubernatorial election
- 1962 Minnesota lieutenant gubernatorial election
- 1962 Nebraska lieutenant gubernatorial election
- 1962 Ohio lieutenant gubernatorial election
- 1962 Texas lieutenant gubernatorial election
- 1962 Wisconsin lieutenant gubernatorial election

==== United States gubernatorial ====
- 1962 Alabama gubernatorial election
- 1962 Alaska gubernatorial election
- 1962 Arizona gubernatorial election
- 1962 Arkansas gubernatorial election
- 1962 California gubernatorial election
- 1962 Colorado gubernatorial election
- 1962 Connecticut gubernatorial election
- 1962 Georgia gubernatorial election
- 1962 Hawaii gubernatorial election
- 1962 Idaho gubernatorial election
- 1962 Iowa gubernatorial election
- 1962 Kansas gubernatorial election
- 1962 Maine gubernatorial election
- 1962 Maryland gubernatorial election
- 1962 Massachusetts gubernatorial election
- 1962 Michigan gubernatorial election
- 1962 Minnesota gubernatorial election
- 1962 Nebraska gubernatorial election
- 1962 Nevada gubernatorial election
- 1962 New Hampshire gubernatorial election
- 1962 New Mexico gubernatorial election
- 1962 New York gubernatorial election
- 1962 North Dakota gubernatorial election
- 1962 Ohio gubernatorial election
- 1962 Oklahoma gubernatorial election
- 1962 Oregon gubernatorial election
- 1962 Pennsylvania gubernatorial election
- 1962 Rhode Island gubernatorial election
- 1962 South Carolina gubernatorial election
- 1962 South Dakota gubernatorial election
- 1962 Tennessee gubernatorial election
- 1962 Texas gubernatorial election
- 1962 United States gubernatorial elections
- 1962 Vermont gubernatorial election
- 1962 Wisconsin gubernatorial election
- 1962 Wyoming gubernatorial election

==== United States House of Representatives ====
- 1962 United States House of Representatives elections

==== United States Senate ====
- 1962 United States Senate elections
- 1962 United States Senate election in Alabama
- 1962 United States Senate election in Alaska
- 1962 United States Senate election in Arizona
- 1962 United States Senate election in Arkansas
- 1962 United States Senate election in California
- 1962 United States Senate election in Colorado
- 1962 United States Senate election in Connecticut
- 1962 United States Senate election in Florida
- 1962 United States Senate election in Georgia
- 1962 United States Senate election in Hawaii
- 1962 United States Senate election in Idaho
- 1962 United States Senate special election in Idaho
- 1962 United States Senate election in Illinois
- 1962 United States Senate election in Indiana
- 1962 United States Senate election in Iowa
- 1962 United States Senate election in Kansas
- 1962 United States Senate special election in Kansas
- 1962 United States Senate election in Kentucky
- 1962 United States Senate election in Louisiana
- 1962 United States Senate election in Maryland
- 1962 United States Senate special election in Massachusetts
- 1962 United States Senate election in Missouri
- 1962 United States Senate election in Nevada
- 1962 United States Senate election in New Hampshire
- 1962 United States Senate special election in New Hampshire
- 1962 United States Senate election in New York
- 1962 United States Senate election in North Carolina
- 1962 United States Senate election in North Dakota
- 1962 United States Senate election in Ohio
- 1962 United States Senate election in Oklahoma
- 1962 United States Senate election in Oregon
- 1962 United States Senate election in Pennsylvania
- 1962 United States Senate election in South Carolina
- 1962 United States Senate election in South Dakota
- 1962 United States Senate election in Utah
- 1962 United States Senate election in Vermont
- 1962 United States Senate election in Washington
- 1962 United States Senate election in Wisconsin
- 1962 United States Senate special election in Wyoming

==== United States mayoral elections ====
- 1962 Cleveland mayoral special election
- 1962 New Orleans mayoral election

== South America ==
- 1962 Argentine legislative election
- 1962 Bolivian legislative election
- 1962 Brazilian legislative election
- 1962 Colombian parliamentary election
- 1962 Colombian presidential election
- 1962 Costa Rican general election
- 1962 Ecuadorian parliamentary election
- 1962 Peruvian general election
- 1962 Salvadoran presidential election
- 1962 Uruguayan general election
- 1962 Uruguayan constitutional referendum

== Oceania ==
=== Australia ===
- 1962 Batman by-election
- 1962 Mildura state by-election
- 1962 Richmond state by-election
- 1962 New South Wales state election
- 1962 South Australian state election
- 1962 Western Australian state election
