= Rackett, Nebraska =

- Unincorporated community
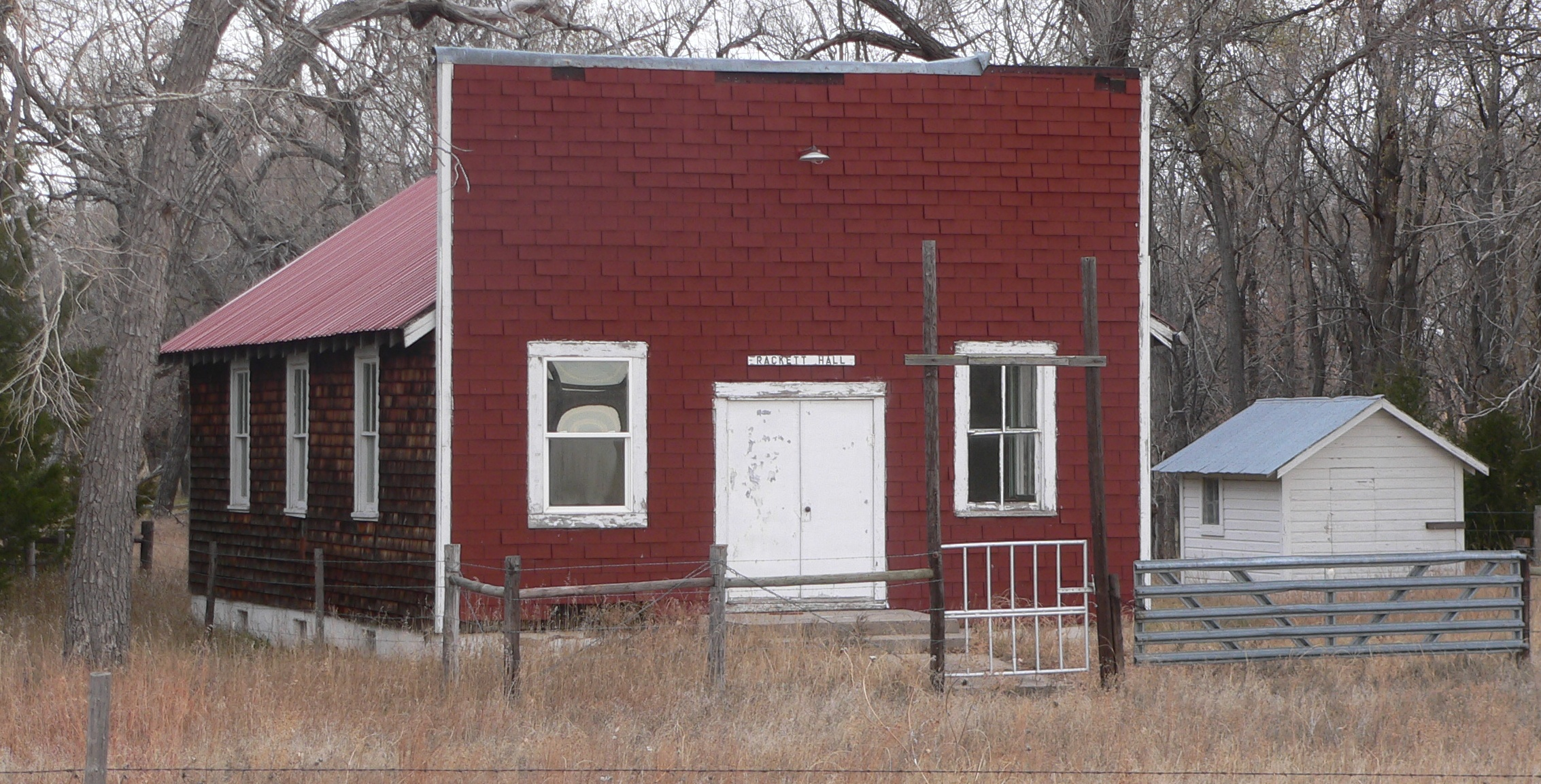
- Rackett Hall

- Location within Nebraska Location within the United States
- Coordinates: 41°40′00″N 102°12′22″W
- Country: United States
- State: Nebraska
- County: Garden
- Elevation: 3,780 ft (1,150 m)
- Time zone: UTC-7 (Mountain (MST))
  - Summer (DST): UTC-6 (MDT)
- Area code: 308
- GNIS feature ID: 832433

Rackett is an unincorporated community in Garden County, Nebraska, United States. Rackett is 19.3 miles (31.1 km) north-northeast of Oshkosh. Rackett Grange Hall No. 318, which is listed on the National Register of Historic Places, is located in Rackett.

A post office was established in Rackett in 1910, and remained in operation until it was discontinued in 1944.
