= Senator Russell =

Senator Russell may refer to:

== Australia ==
- William Russell (Australian politician) (1842–1912), senator for South Australia (1907–1912)
- Edward Russell (Australian politician) (1878–1925), senator for Victoria (1907–1925)

== United States ==
Members of the U.S. Senate:

- Richard Russell Jr. (1897–1971), senator from Georgia (1933–1971)
- Donald S. Russell (1906–1998), senator from South Carolina (1965–1966)

Members of the New York State Senate:

- Ebenezer Russell (1747–1836), senator from the Eastern District (1778–1782, 1784–1788, 1795–1803)
- Michael Russell (Rensselaer County, New York) (1844–1901), senator from the 30th District (1901)
- Charles H. Russell (Brooklyn) (1845–1912), senator from Kings County, 9th District (1880–1881) and the 3rd District (1882–1883)
- Charles E. Russell (1868–1960), senator from the 9th District (1919–1920, 1923–1924, 1926–1929)

Members of other state senates:

- Benjamin Russell (journalist) (1761–1845), Massachusetts State Senator
- William Russell (Ohio politician) (1782–1845), Ohio Senator from Adams County (1819–1821)
- Charles Theodore Russell (1815–1866), Massachusetts State Senator
- Harry F. Russell (1890–1972), Nebraska State Senate
- J. Edward Russell (1867–1953), Ohio State Senator from the 12th District (1906–1909)
- Lee M. Russell (1875–1943), Mississippi State Senator (1909)
- Charles H. Russell (1903–1989), Nevada State Senator (1941–1946)
- John W. Russell Jr. (1923–2015), Oklahoma State Senator from Okmulgee County (1952–?)
- Newton Russell (1927–2013), California State Senator from the 21st District (1974–1996)
- John Russell (Missouri politician) (1931–2016), Missouri State Senator (1976–2000)
- Steve Russell (politician) (born 1963), Oklahoma State Senator from the 45th District (2009–2013)

== See also ==
- Allen Russell (1893–1972), pitcher for the Washington Senators (1923–1925)
- Jack Russell (baseball) (1905–1990), pitcher for the Washington Senators (1933–1936)
