= Rackett Grange Hall No. 318 =

- Rackett Grange Hall # 318
- U.S. National Register of Historic Places
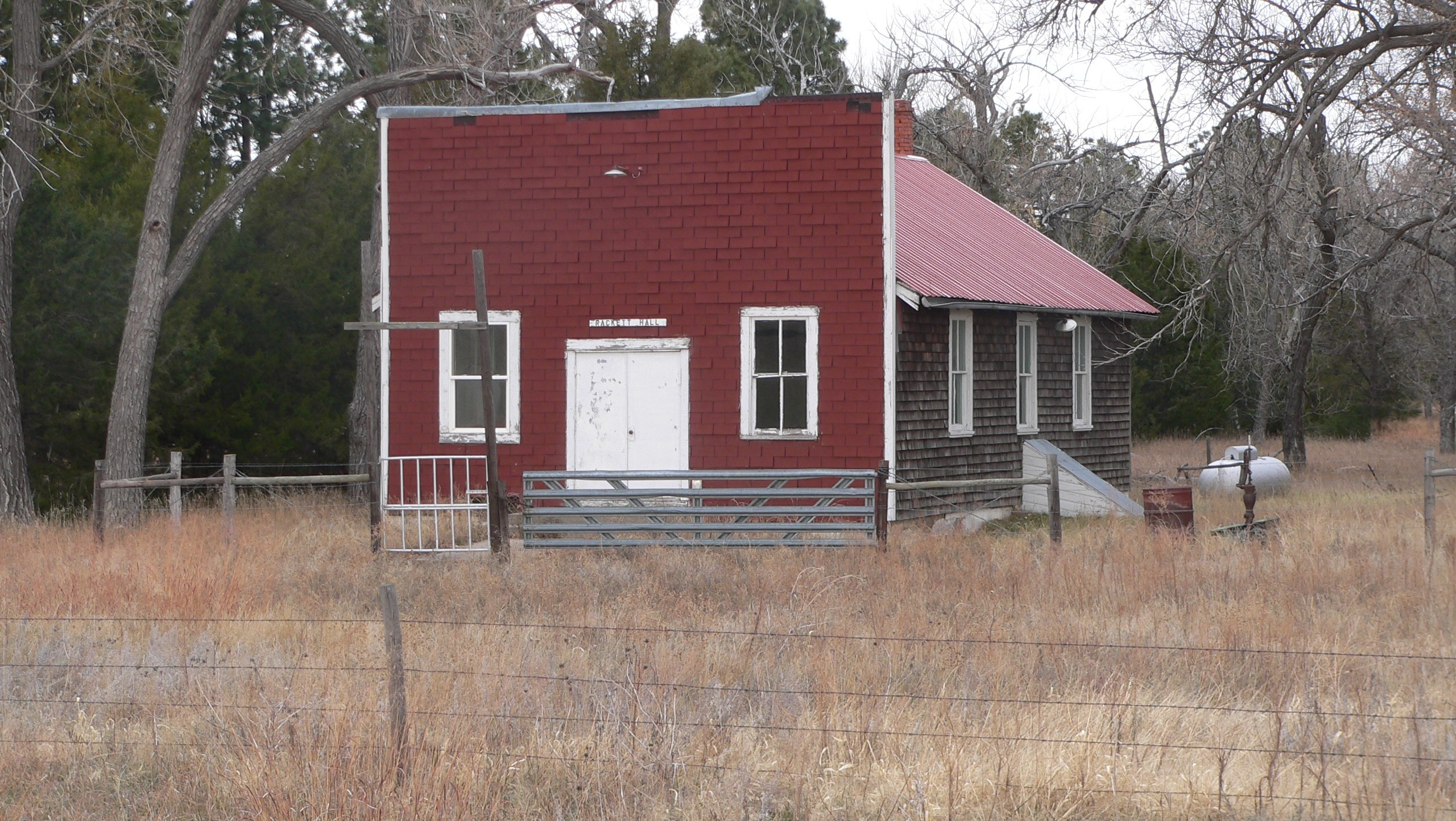

- Location within Nebraska Location within the United States
- Nearest city: Oshkosh, Nebraska
- Coordinates: 41°39′53″N 102°12′17″W
- Area: less than one acre
- Built: 1926
- Architect: Mardis, Sam
- Architectural style: Western false front
- NRHP reference No.: 01000713
- Added to NRHP: July 5, 2001

The Rackett Grange Hall No. 318, also known as Rackett Community Hall and denoted NeHBS No. GD04-002, is a building in rural Garden County, Nebraska, United States, that was built in 1926. It was listed on the National Register of Historic Places in 2001.

It was located in the town of Rackett, which no longer exists; it is now located in a remote area within what is now Crescent Lake National Wildlife Refuge.

It is a false-front commercial building; other historic resources of the property are a shed, an outhouse, and a well with a hand pump. The property is significant for its association with the Grange, the Patrons of Husbandry movement. The building also is significant as a now-rare example of the once-common style of false-front architecture.
