= Morrill Fire =

2026 wildfire in Nebraska

- Part of the 2026 Nebraska wildfires
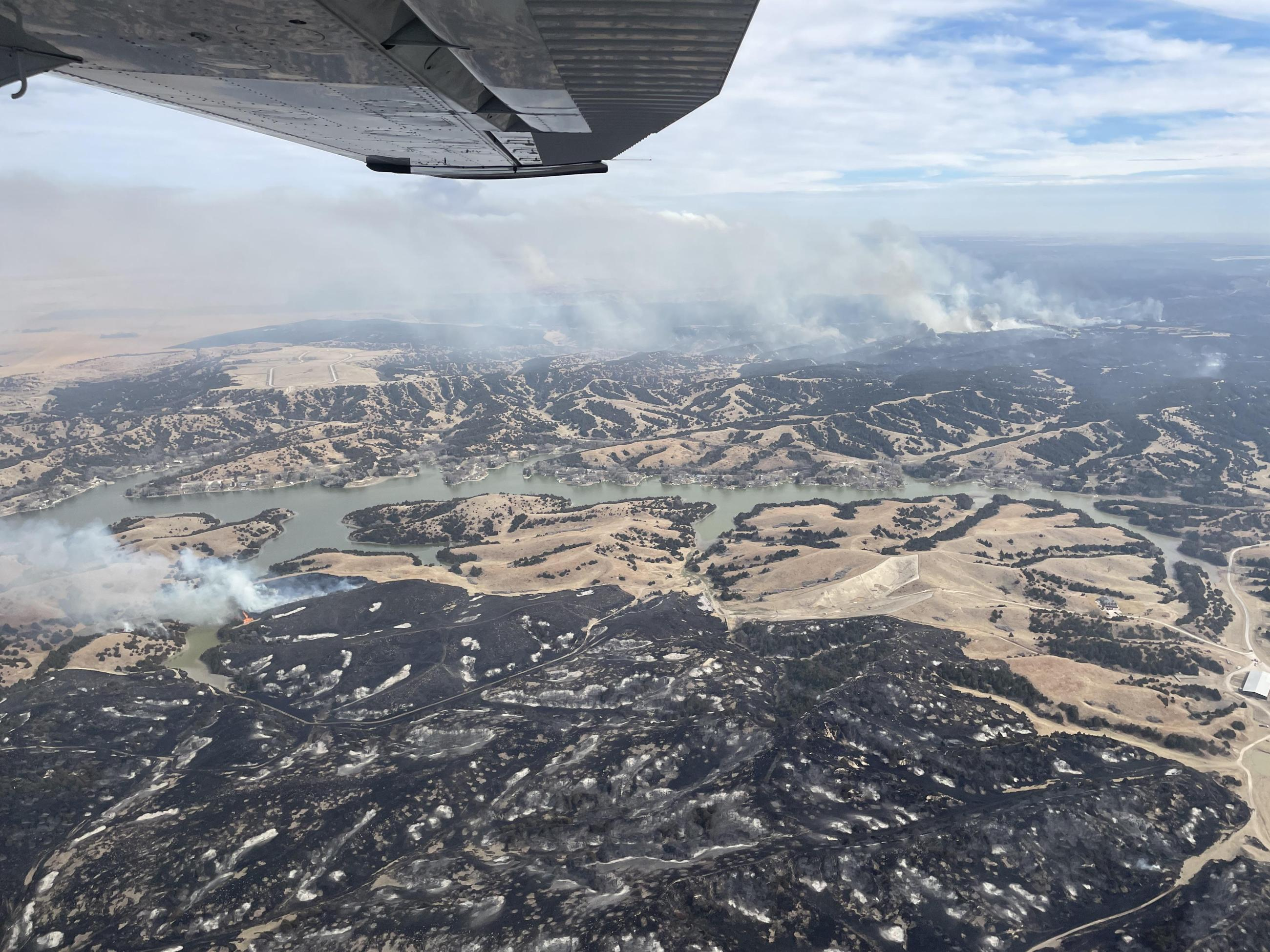
- Aerial view of the fire on March 14. The Morrill Fire is the largest wildfire fire in Nebraska history.
- Date: March 12, 2026 – March 25, 2026
- Location: Keith County, Nebraska, Arthur County, Nebraska, Grant County, Nebraska, Garden County, Nebraska, Morrill County, Nebraska
- Coordinates: 41.4627°N 102.5536°W

Statistics
- Perimeter: 100% contained
- Burned area: 643,361 acres (260,359 ha)

Impacts
- Deaths: 1

Ignition
- Cause: Power Lines

Map
- Perimeter map of Morrill Fire (map data)

The Morrill Fire was a megafire that burned in Keith, Arthur, Grant, Garden, and Morrill counties in the U.S. state of Nebraska. As of March 25, the fire had burned 643,361 acres (260,359 ha) and was 100% contained. It was the largest wildfire in the United States during the 2026 wildfire season as well as by far the largest wildfire in Nebraska state history. The wildfire was part of an outbreak of wind-driven grass fires which included this one (the biggest), the Cottonwood Fire: 128,192 acres (51,877 ha), the Road 203 Fire 35,912 acres (14,533 ha), and the Anderson Bridge Fire: 17,400 acres (7,000 ha). All four fires burned a total 824,865 acres (333,811 ha).

== Progression ==
The Morrill Fire was first reported at approximately 2:53 p.m. CDT on March 12, 2026, northeast of Bridgeport, Nebraska. The cause remains under investigation, though Nebraska Governor Jim Pillen suspected that the fire was caused by sparks from an electrical pole. This fire originated in the service territory of Chimney Rock Public Power District.

Following the formation of the fireline, the Morrill Fire traveled over 70 miles in under 6 hours in grass and timber understory, overrunning the southern area of the Crescent Lake National Wildlife Refuge by late evening and crossing into northern Arthur and southern Keith county, nearly making it to Lake McConaughy. At the time of its initial rapid growth, there was little notice of what was happening and little information, with one of the only sources showing that the fire was moving were satellite heat signatures from a wildland fire portal. Local fire departments were vastly overwhelmed by the fire's extreme rates of spread.

By midnight, a wind shift drove the fire heavily to the south and in turn almost burned down the city of Oshkosh and the village Lewellen, where residents were advised to "turn on their sprinklers." The fireline was almost 100 miles long at this point.

The next morning, aircraft were over the fire dropping retardant. It was reported that the fire front burned back over itself and forward progression was stopped on that part of the fire. However, During the afternoon, the fire was driven by strong northerly winds and pushed itself farther north through Garden County, prompting more evacuations. The estimated size of the fire continued to go up during the following days as mapping efforts improved, starting at 330,000 acres before growing to 453,299 acres, then 548,993 acres, and finally 643,361 acres. A Complex Incident Management Team (CIMT) was assigned to all of the fires burning in the panhandle at the time. Containment on the fire increased significantly following no reported growth outside the fire's perimeter despite continued red flag conditions. The only exception was unburned fuels readily igniting within the burn scar and stands of red cedar holding intense heat.

Command of the fire was transferred back to local fire departments as containment continued to go up, reaching 100% on the 25th.

== Background ==
The National Weather Service Storm Prediction Center issued a Day 1 Fire Weather Outlook for March 12, 2026, highlighting an Extremely Critical risk for portions of western Nebraska and eastern Wyoming. Driven by 20–35 miles per hour (32–56 km/h) winds, and 15-20% humidity and low vegetation, the conditions created a high-impact, rapid fire spread environment primed for these kinds of fast moving fires.

== Effects ==
The fire caused evacuations for Lewellen and areas around Lake McConaughy and destroyed "numerous" structures, including cattle ranches and barns. Smoke was widespread and created hazardous air quality for much of Nebraska, northern Colorado, and northwestern Kansas. It is the largest recorded single wildfire in Nebraska state history. The fire killed one civilian, 86-year-old Rose White, a grandmother in Arthur County who died when the flames overtook her house.

Date	Acres	Containment	Citation
March 12	330,000 acres (130,000 ha)		
March 13	453,299 acres (183,444 ha)		
March 14	548,993 acres (222,170 ha)		
March 15	572,082 acres (231,513 ha)		
March 16	572,082 acres (231,513 ha)		
March 17	642,973 acres (260,202 ha)		
March 18	643,361 acres (260,359 ha)		
March 19	643,361 acres (260,359 ha)		
March 20	643,361 acres (260,359 ha)		
March 21	643,361 acres (260,359 ha)		
March 22	643,361 acres (260,359 ha)		
March 23	643,361 acres (260,359 ha)		
March 24	643,361 acres (260,359 ha)		
March 25	643,361 acres (260,359 ha)		

== See also ==
- 2026 United States wildfires
- 2026 Nebraska wildfires
