= MNRA =

MNRA may refer to:

- Authentic Nationalist Revolutionary Movement, a small right-wing political party in Bolivia
- Revolutionary Nationalist Movement-Alliance
