= 1944 Nebraska gubernatorial election =

- November 7, 1944
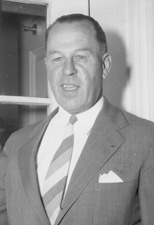

Nominee	Dwight Griswold	George W. Olsen
Party	Republican	Democratic
Popular vote	410,136	128,760
Percentage	76.11%	23.89%
- County results Griswold: 60–70% 70–80% 80–90%
Governor before election
Dwight Griswold
Republican
Elected Governor
Dwight Griswold
Republican

The 1944 Nebraska gubernatorial election was held on November 7, 1944, and featured incumbent Governor Dwight Griswold, a Republican, defeating Democratic nominee, busboy George W. Olsen, to win a third and final two-year term in office.

== Democratic primary ==
=== Candidates ===
- P. J. Heaton, Sidney City Attorney
- George W. Olsen, busboy at Glenn L. Martin Bomber Plant cafeteria and unsuccessful candidate for the Democratic nomination for governor in 1932

=== Results ===
Democratic primary results
Party	Candidate	Votes	%
Democratic	George W. Olsen	20,000	50.45
Democratic	P. J. Heaton	19,626	49.50
Democratic	Write-in	20	0.05

== Republican primary ==
=== Candidates ===
- William R. Brooks
- Dwight Griswold, incumbent Governor

=== Results ===
Republican primary results
Party	Candidate	Votes	%
Republican	Dwight Griswold (incumbent)	74,359	84.79
Republican	William R. Brooks	13,336	15.21
Republican	Write-in	1	>0.01

== General election ==
=== Results ===
Nebraska gubernatorial election, 1944
Party	Candidate	Votes	%
Republican	Dwight Griswold (incumbent)	410,136	76.11%
Democratic	George W. Olsen	128,760	23.89%
Total votes		538,896	100.0%
Republican hold			

==== By County ====
By county

County	Person Democratic		Person Republican		Various candidates Other parties		Margin		Total votes
County	#	%	#	%	#	%	#	%	Total votes
Adams County									
Antelope County									
Arthur County									
Banner County									
Blaine County									
Boone County									
Box Butte County									
Boyd County									
Brown County									
Buffalo County									
Burt County									
Butler County									
Cass County									
Cedar County									
Chase County									
Cherry County									
Cheyenne County									
Clay County									
Colfax County									
Cuming County									
Custer County									
Dakota County									
Dawes County									
Dawson County									
Deuel County									
Dixon County									
Dodge County									
Douglas County									
Dundy County									
Fillmore County									
Franklin County									
Frontier County									
Furnas County									
Gage County									
Garden County									
Garfield County									
Gosper County									
Grant County									
Greeley County									
Hall County									
Hamilton County									
Hayes County									
Hitchcock County									
Holt County									
Hooker County									
Howard County									
Jefferson County									
Johnson County									
Kearney County									
Keith County									
Keya Paha County									
Kimball County									
Knox County									
Lancaster County									
Lincoln County									
Logan County									
Loup County									
Madison County									
McPherson County									
Merrick County									
Morrill County									
Nance County									
Nance County									
Nemaha County									
Nuckolls County									
Otoe County									
Pawnee County									
Perkins County									
Phelps County									
Pierce County									
Platte County									
Polk County									
Red Willow County									
Richardson County									
Rock County									
Saline County									
Sarpy County									
Saunders County									
Scotts Bluff County									
Seward County									
Sheridan County									
Sioux County									
Stanton County									
Thayer County									
Stanton County									
Thurston County									
Valley County									
Washington County									
Wayne County									
Webster County									
Wheeler County									
York County									
Totals									

== See also ==
- 1944 Nebraska lieutenant gubernatorial election
