= 1948 United States Senate election in Nebraska =

- November 2, 1948
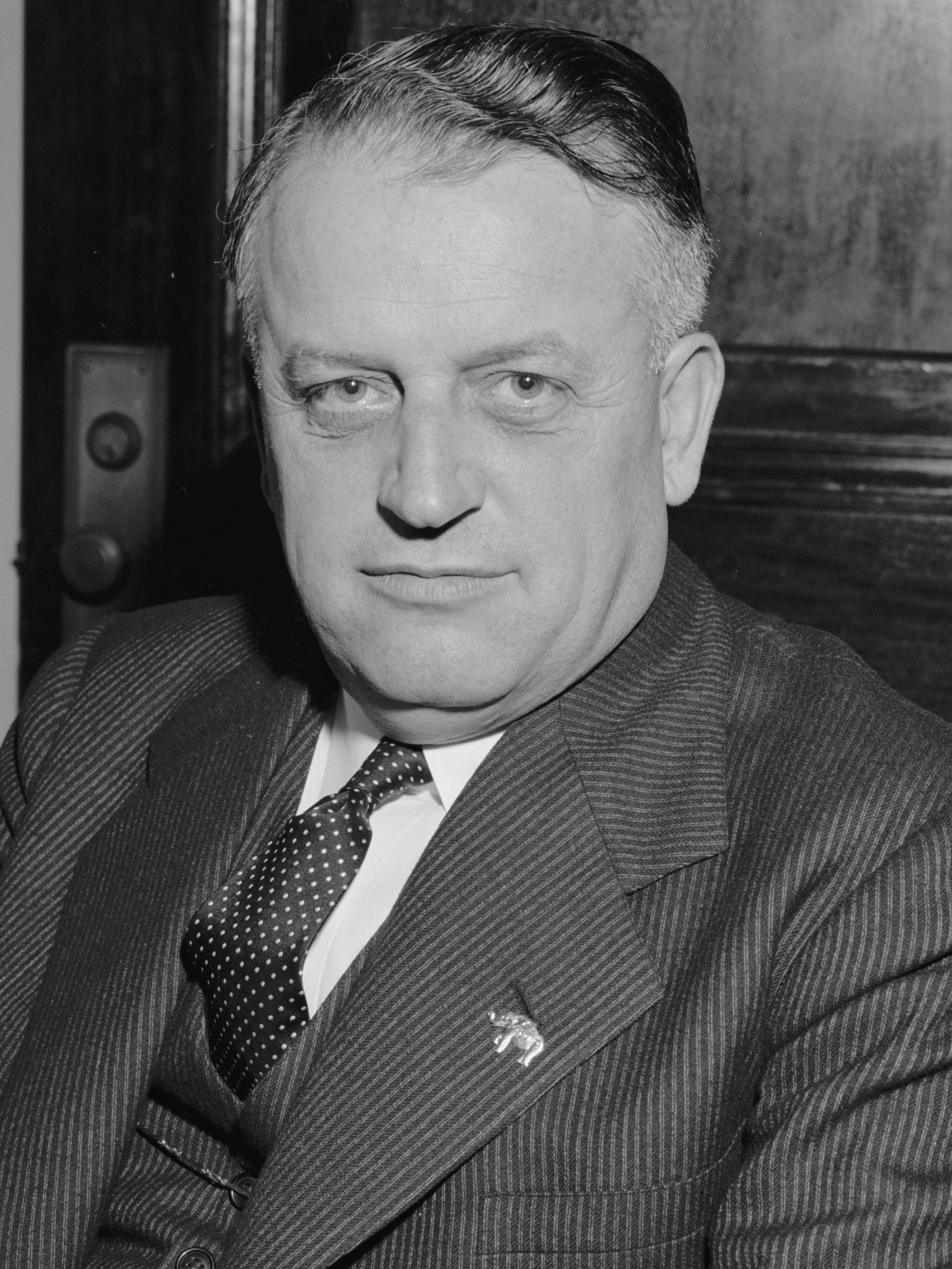

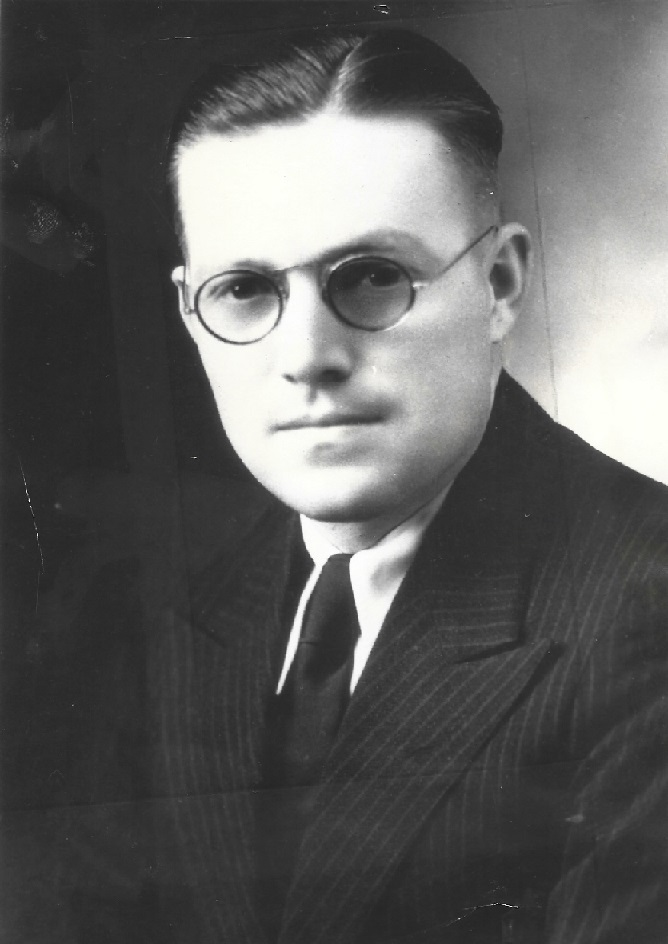
Nominee	Kenneth S. Wherry	Terry Carpenter
Party	Republican	Democratic
Popular vote	267,575	204,320
Percentage	56.67%	43.27%
- County results Wherry: 50–60% 60–70% 70–80% Carpenter: 50–60% 60–70%
U.S. senator before election
Kenneth S. Wherry
Republican
Elected U.S. Senator
Kenneth S. Wherry
Republican

The 1948 United States Senate election in Nebraska took place on November 2, 1948. Incumbent Republican Senator Kenneth S. Wherry, who served as the Senate Majority Whip, ran for re-election to a second term. Wherry was challenged by former Congressman Terry Carpenter, the Democratic nominee. Despite significant Democratic gains nationwide, Wherry won re-election by a wide margin, defeating Carpenter with 57% of the vote. Wherry overperformed Republican presidential candidate Thomas Dewey by 2.55%, who won the state with 54.15% in the presidential election.

== Democratic primary ==
=== Candidates ===
- Terry Carpenter, former U.S. Representative from Nebraska's 5th congressional district
- Albin T. Anderson, University of Nebraska–Lincoln history professor
- George W. Olsen, 1944 Democratic nominee for Governor

=== Results ===
Democratic primary results
Party	Candidate	Votes	%
Democratic	Terry Carpenter	43,034	55.50%
Democratic	Albin T. Anderson	26,233	33.83%
Democratic	George W. Olsen	8,274	10.67%
Democratic	Scattering	2	0.00%
Total votes		77,543	100.00%

== Republican primary ==
=== Candidates ===
- Kenneth S. Wherry, incumbent Senator
- Joseph B. Bovey, professional service representative

=== Results ===
Republican primary
Party	Candidate	Votes	%
Republican	Kenneth S. Wherry (inc.)	134,479	83.53%
Republican	Joseph B. Bovey	26,468	16.44%
Republican	Scattering	49	0.03%
Total votes		160,996	100.00%

== Results ==
1948 United States Senate election in Nebraska
Party	Candidate	Votes	%	±%
Republican	Kenneth S. Wherry (inc.)	267,575	56.67%	+7.70%
Democratic	Terry Carpenter	204,320	43.27%	+21.24%
Write-in		261	0.06%	—
Majority		63,255	13.40%	−6.93%
Total votes		472,156	100.00%	
Republican hold				
