= Mumper =

Mumper may refer to:

- Larry Mumper (born 1937), American politician
- Mumper, Nebraska, unincorporated community
