= Cottonwood Fire =

Cottonwood Fire may refer to:

- Cottonwood Fire (2009), a California wildfire
- Cottonwood Fire (Nebraska, 2026), a Nebraska wildfire
- Cottonwood Fire (Utah, 2026), an active wildfire in Utah
