= 1962 Bolivian legislative election =

- 4 June 1962
- Chamber of Deputies
- 38 of the 72 seats in the Chamber of Deputies
Party	Leader	Vote %	Seats	+/–
MNR	Víctor Paz Estenssoro	84.79	32	0
FSB	Mario Gutiérrez	7.09	3	+1
PRA	Wálter Guevara	4.24	2	New
PSC	Benjamín Miguel Harb	1.90	1	+1
This lists parties that won seats. See the complete results below.
- Senate
- 15 of the 27 seats in the Senate
Party	Vote %	Seats	+/–
MNR	84.79	15	+9
This lists parties that won seats. See the complete results below.

Parliamentary elections were held in Bolivia on 4 June 1962. The Revolutionary Nationalist Movement (MNR) received 85% of the vote, and retained its large majority in both houses of Congress.

== Results ==
Party	Votes	%	Seats					
Party	Votes	%	Chamber			Senate		
Party	Votes	%	Elected	Total	+/–	Elected	Total	+/–
Revolutionary Nationalist Movement	886,572	84.79	32	64	+13	15	27	+9
Bolivian Socialist Falange	74,178	7.09	3	4	+1	0	0	0
Authentic Revolutionary Party	44,296	4.24	2	3	–11	0	0	0
Communist Party	20,352	1.95	0	0	0	0	0	0
Social Christian Party	19,825	1.90	1	1	New	0	0	New
Revolutionary Workers' Party	278	0.03	0	0	0	0	0	0
Authentic Revolutionary Nationalist Movement	100	0.01	0	0	New	0	0	New
Total	1,045,601	100	38	72	+4	15	27	+9
Valid votes	1,045,601	98.13						
Invalid/blank votes	19,979	1.87						
Total	1,065,580	100						
Source: Nohlen, Ruddle, Political Handbook of the World 1963

== See also ==
- Bolivian National Congress, 1960–1962
