= 2026 Nebraska wildfires =

Series of wildfires

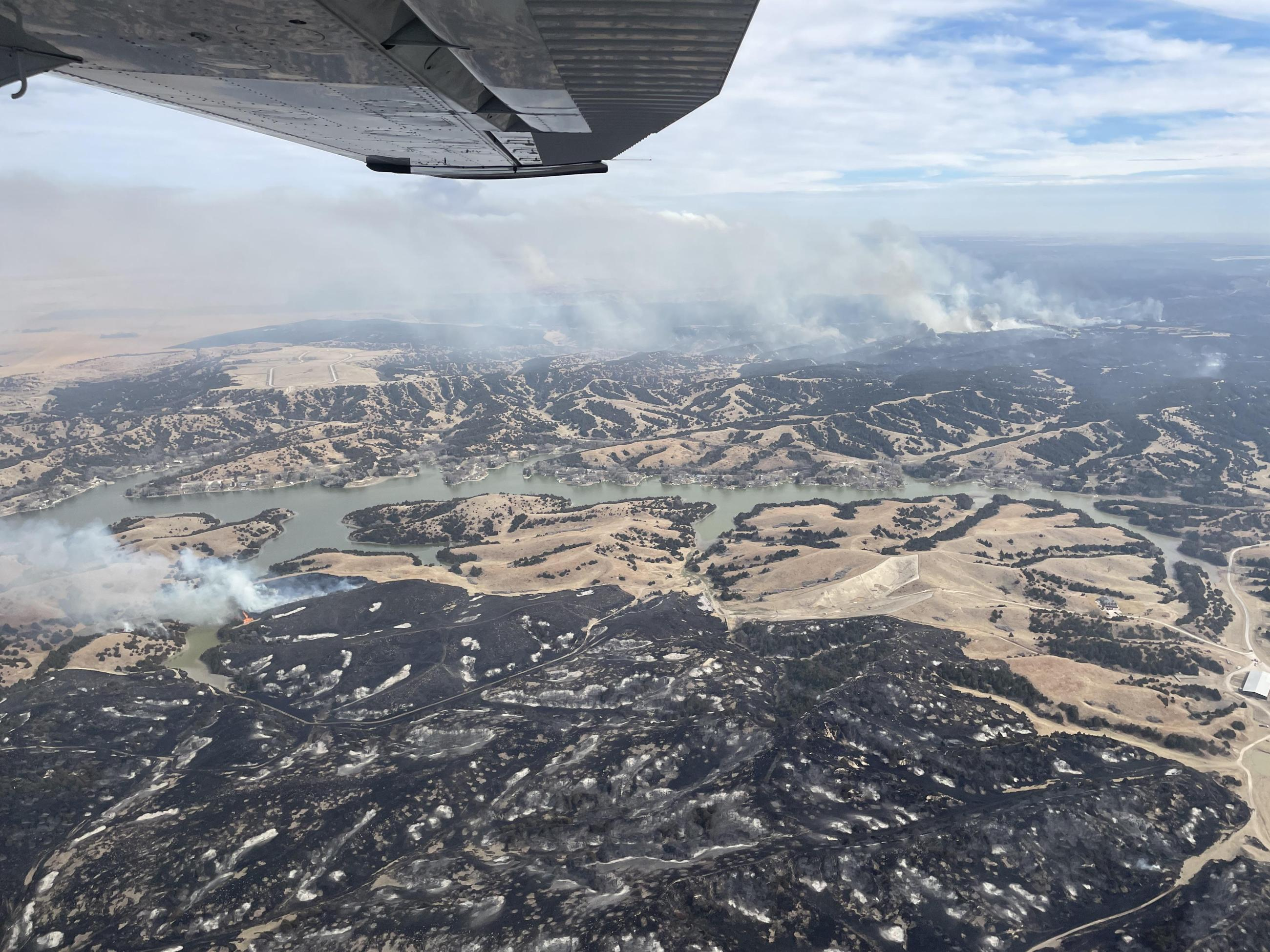
- Aerial view of the Morrill Fire on March 14

Statistics
- Total area: 930,000 acres (376,358 ha)

The 2026 Nebraska wildfires are a series of active wildfires currently ongoing in Nebraska.

== Background ==
While "fire season" varies every year in Nebraska, most wildfires occur in between February and April. However, there is an increasing fire danger in the late winter months. Fire conditions can be exacerbated by drought, strong winds, and vegetation growth. Climate change is leading to increased temperatures, lower humidity levels, and drought conditions are happening more often. Additionally, warmer temperatures and less precipitation can result in less snowmelt, further contributing to bad wildfire conditions. The previous winter (2025-2026) was one of the warmest and driest on record in Nebraska, increasing the risk of wildfires.

== List of wildfires ==
The following is a list of fires that burned more than 1,000 acres (400 ha), produced significant structural damage, or resulted in casualties.

Name	County	Acres	Start date	Containment date	Notes	Ref.
Road 203	Blaine, Thomas	35,892	March 12	March 25		
Anderson Bridge	Cherry	17,229	March 12	March 23		
Morrill	Morrill, Garden, Arthur, Keith	643,361	March 12	March 25	Caused evacuations for Lewellen and areas around Lake McConaughy. Ran approximately 70 miles in one day. Largest recorded single wildfire in modern state history as well as one of the largest in United States history. (see article)	
Cottonwood	Dawson, Lincoln, Frontier	129,253	March 12	March 27	Caused numerous evacuations for Farnam and surrounding areas. Destroyed over 40 structures, and is the second largest recorded wildfire in state history behind only the Morill fire.	
Ashby	Sheridan, Grant, Garden, Cherry	36,004	March 26	April 2	Caused evacuations for Ashby and Hyannis. burned near the Morrill fire.	
Minor	Grant	14,082	March 26	April 1		
Pressey	Custer	9,141	April 22	May 4	Burned north of Oconto.	
Daly	McPherson	5,173	April 22	April 24	Burned 18 miles (29 km) west of Tryon.	
Vasa	Arthur	2,100	April 22	98%	Burning north of Keystone. Will remain at 98% containment until significant precipitation.	
Peterson	Holt	1,000	April 22	May 6		
Ash Pole	Dawes	1,028	May 14	May 20	Burned 9 miles (14 km) southeast of Crawford.	
South Fork	Sioux, Dawes	39,696	June 9	June 24	Jumped and closed highway 20 and burned in the Soldier Creek Wilderness along with Robinson State Park and Wilderness. Prompted evacuations and threatened the city of Crawford.	
Log Road	Sioux	1,526	June 29	July 5	Burned near the South Fork Fire burn scar 13 miles (21 km) east-northeast of Harrison.	
