= Fred A. Seaton =

American politician

Fred Seaton
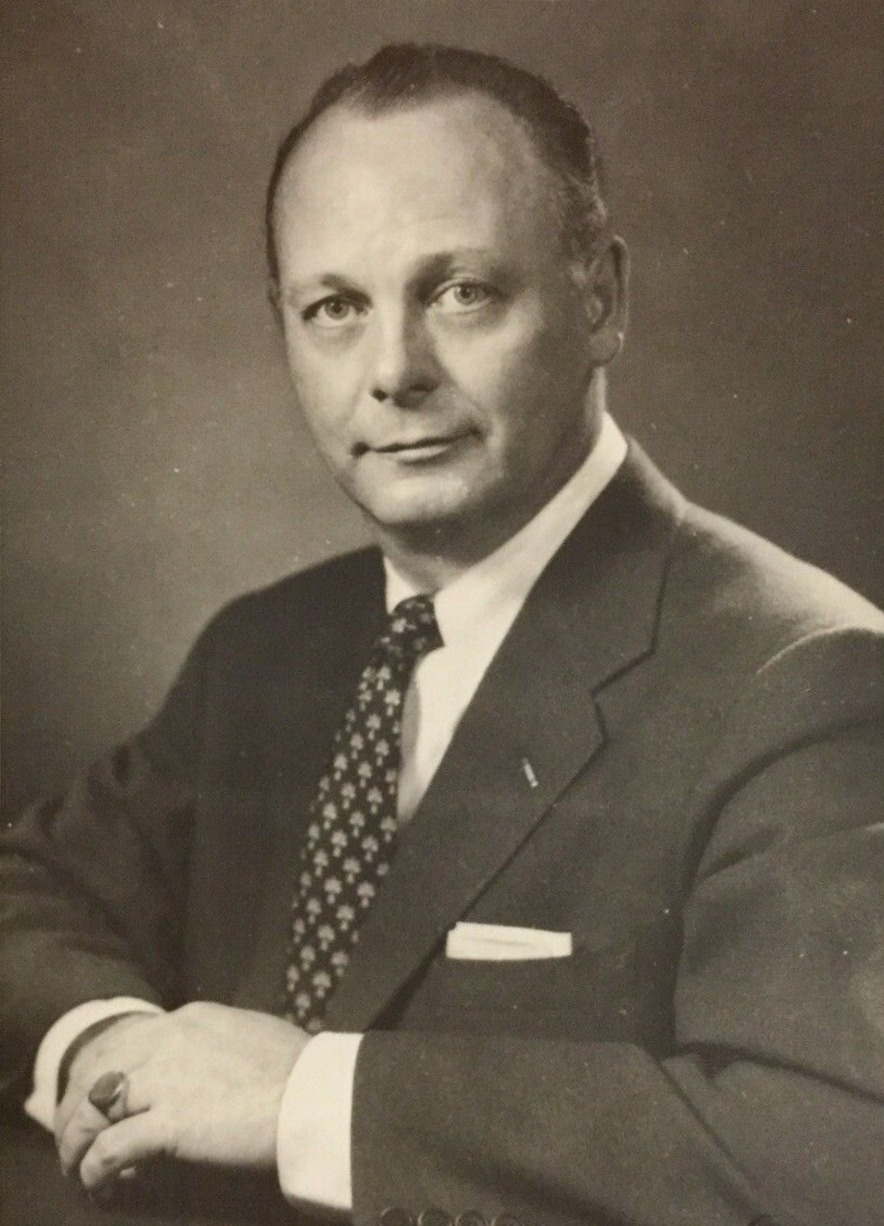
- Seaton as Interior Secretary c. 1960

36th United States Secretary of the Interior
- In office June 8, 1956 – January 20, 1961
- President: Dwight D. Eisenhower
- Preceded by: Douglas McKay
- Succeeded by: Stewart Udall

4th Assistant Secretary of Defense for Legislative Affairs
- In office September 15, 1953 – February 20, 1955
- President: Dwight D. Eisenhower
- Preceded by: Charles Coolidge
- Succeeded by: Robert Ross

United States Senator from Nebraska
- In office December 10, 1951 – November 4, 1952
- Appointed by: Val Peterson
- Preceded by: Kenneth S. Wherry
- Succeeded by: Dwight Griswold

Member of the Nebraska Legislature from the 31st district
- In office January 2, 1945 – January 4, 1949
- Preceded by: Harry F. Russell
- Succeeded by: William Bohlke

Personal details
- Born: Frederick Andrew Seaton; December 11, 1909 Washington, D.C., U.S.
- Died: January 16, 1974 (aged 64) Minneapolis, Minnesota, U.S.
- Party: Republican
- Education: Kansas State University (BA)

Frederick Andrew Seaton (December 11, 1909 – January 16, 1974) was an American newspaperman and politician. He represented the U.S. state of Nebraska in the U.S. Senate and served as U.S. Secretary of the Interior during Dwight D. Eisenhower's administration.

== Early life and education ==
Seaton was born in Washington, D.C., on December 11, 1909, the son of Dorothea Elizabeth (née Schmidt) and Fay Noble Seaton. He attended the Manhattan High School in Manhattan, Kansas. He graduated from Kansas State University in 1931, and married Gladys Hope Dowd (November 5, 1910 – January 5, 1999) in the same year. They had four children: Donald Richard, Alfred Noble, Johanna Christine, and Monica Margaret Seaton. In 1937, Seaton moved to Hastings, Nebraska, where he was for many years the publisher of the Hastings Tribune.

== Political career ==
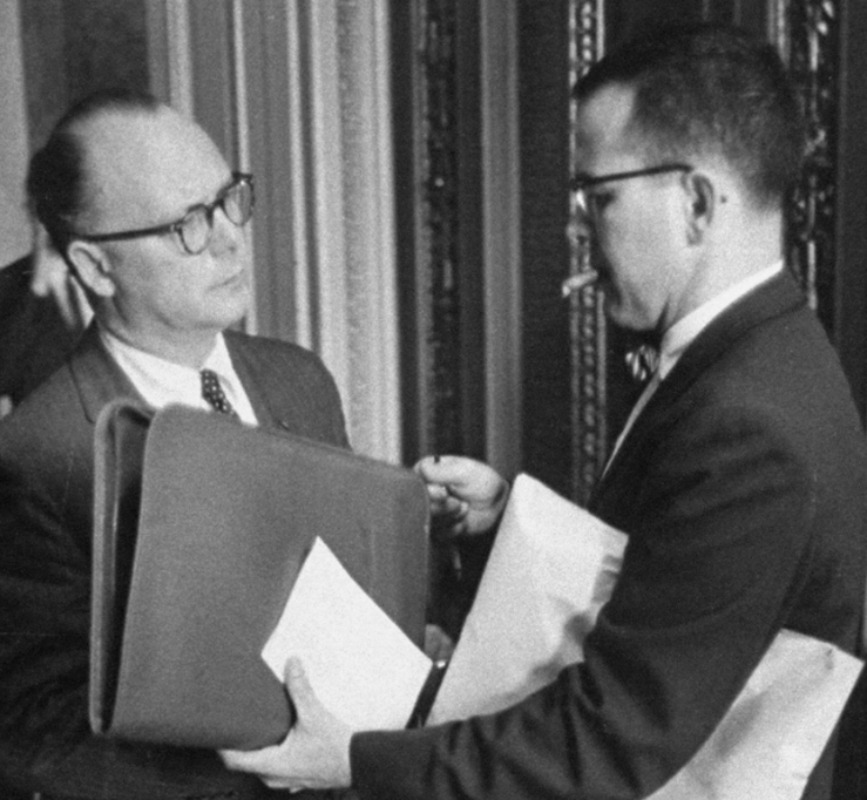
Secretary Seaton with Solicitor Ted Stevens in 1960

Seaton was active in Republican politics. He served in the unicameral Nebraska Legislature from 1945 to 1949. He was appointed to the U.S. Senate on December 10, 1951, by Gov. Val Peterson to fill the vacancy created by the death of Kenneth S. Wherry. A Rockefeller Republican, Seaton was senator for less than a year; he had to vacate the post on November 4, 1952, when Dwight Griswold won the 1952 special election to complete the Senate term. He was the second of six Senators to serve during the fifteenth Senate term for Nebraska's Class 2 seat, from January 3, 1949, to January 3, 1955.

Seaton served in various White House and subcabinet posts in the Eisenhower administration, including Assistant Secretary of Defense for Legislative Affairs, before he was appointed as the U.S. Secretary of the Interior. He served in that office from June 8, 1956, until January 20, 1961. During his tenure, Alaska and Hawaii became the 49th and 50th states admitted to the Union. He was instrumental in the passing of the Alaska Statehood Act, appointing and recommending pro-Alaska politicians to high positions, such as Ted Stevens to Senior Counsel to the Secretary of Interior (later becoming Solicitor in 1960) and Mike Stepovich to Governor of the Territory of Alaska.

He ran for governor of Nebraska in 1962 but was defeated by the incumbent Democrat, Gov. Frank B. Morrison (Olson, p. 335). Following his defeat, Seaton became a strong advocate for campaign finance reform in Nebraska.

Seaton died in Minneapolis, Minnesota, on January 16, 1974, and is interred in Parkview Cemetery in Hastings, Nebraska.

U.S. Senate
| Preceded by Kenneth S. Wherry | U.S. Senator (Class 2) from Nebraska; 1951–1952; Served alongside: Hugh A. Butler | Succeeded by Dwight Griswold |
Political offices
| Preceded by Douglas McKay | United States Secretary of the Interior; 1956–1961 | Succeeded by Stewart L. Udall |
Party political offices
| Preceded by John Cooper | Republican nominee for Governor of Nebraska; 1962 | Succeeded by Dwight Burney |
