= Cottonwood Fire (Nebraska, 2026) =

2026 wildfire in Nebraska, United States

- Date: March 12, 2026 – March 27, 2026
- Location: Lincoln, Dawson, and Frontier counties, Nebraska, United States

Statistics
- Status: Extinguished
- Burned area: 129,253 acres (523.07 square kilometres; 52,307 hectares)

Impacts
- Deaths: None reported
- Injuries: None reported
- Evacuated: Farnam and surrounding areas, including Jeffrey Lake
- Structures destroyed: At least 44 destroyed; 170 threatened

Ignition
- Cause: Undetermined

The Cottonwood Fire was a wildfire that burned in Lincoln, Dawson, and Frontier counties in western Nebraska, in the United States, in March 2026. The first emergency notification was issued at 4:37 p.m. on March 12, 2026, reporting a large grass fire near Cottonwood Road and South Government Pocket Road in southeastern Lincoln County, near Maxwell. The fire ultimately burned 129,253 acres (52,310 ha) before reaching full containment on March 27, 2026, making it the second-largest wildfire in Nebraska history, behind only the concurrent Morrill Fire. The two fires burned as part of a broader outbreak of wind-driven grass fires that ignited across the Nebraska High Plains on March 12, 2026, amid a windstorm with gusts exceeding 100 mph (160 km/h) and dry atmospheric conditions.

== Progression ==
By the evening of March 12, the fire had burned a path approximately 30 miles (48 km) long. Around 300 people were evacuated near Brady by March 13, with a school in Brady opened as a shelter; residents of Farnam in Dawson County were also ordered to evacuate, and the fire came within half a mile of the village. Evacuations in the area, including a mandatory evacuation order for Farnam and a separate order for Jeffrey Lake residents, were issued and subsequently rescinded at various points as the fire's behavior fluctuated; at least three areas near the fire remained under evacuation orders in mid-to-late March.

The fire was managed by the Rocky Mountain Complex Incident Management Team 1, the same team that managed the nearby Morrill Fire, under the direction of the State of Nebraska. More than 92 fire departments and task-force units were deployed in response, including the Nebraska National Guard, whose Air Guard Hand Crew and Black Hawk helicopters, alongside Iowa National Guard aircraft, assisted in firefighting efforts.

By March 20, 2026, the fire was 80 percent contained, with a perimeter of approximately 259 miles (417 km). Containment reached 96 percent by March 22–23, with remaining fire activity concentrated on the fire's northwest side amid unburned pockets of eastern redcedar. By March 26, the fire was 98 percent contained; critical fire weather conditions that day caused the fire to spot outside containment lines on its southeastern perimeter northeast of Farnam, though crews limited the resulting growth to approximately 10 acres. The fire reached 100 percent containment on March 27, 2026.

Based on assessments shared with the Nebraska Emergency Management Agency, the fire destroyed at least 44 structures and threatened 170 others, some of which may have been homes. No fatalities or serious injuries were reported in connection with the fire. Downed power lines caused power outages in parts of central and eastern Nebraska. Temporary flight restrictions were put in place over portions of the fire area due to the volume of firefighting aircraft and smoke-reduced visibility.

== Response ==
Nebraska Governor Jim Pillen viewed the Cottonwood Fire from the air before meeting with affected firefighters, ranchers, and residents in Brady. Major General Craig Strong, adjutant general of the Nebraska National Guard, accompanied Pillen in Brady and separately met with state and local emergency officials. Nebraska senator Pete Ricketts toured fire damage and stated the state was "probably looking at one of the largest fires, if not the largest fire, we've ever had."

== See also ==
- Morrill Fire
- 2026 Nebraska wildfires
