= 1942 United States Senate election in Nebraska =

- November 3, 1942
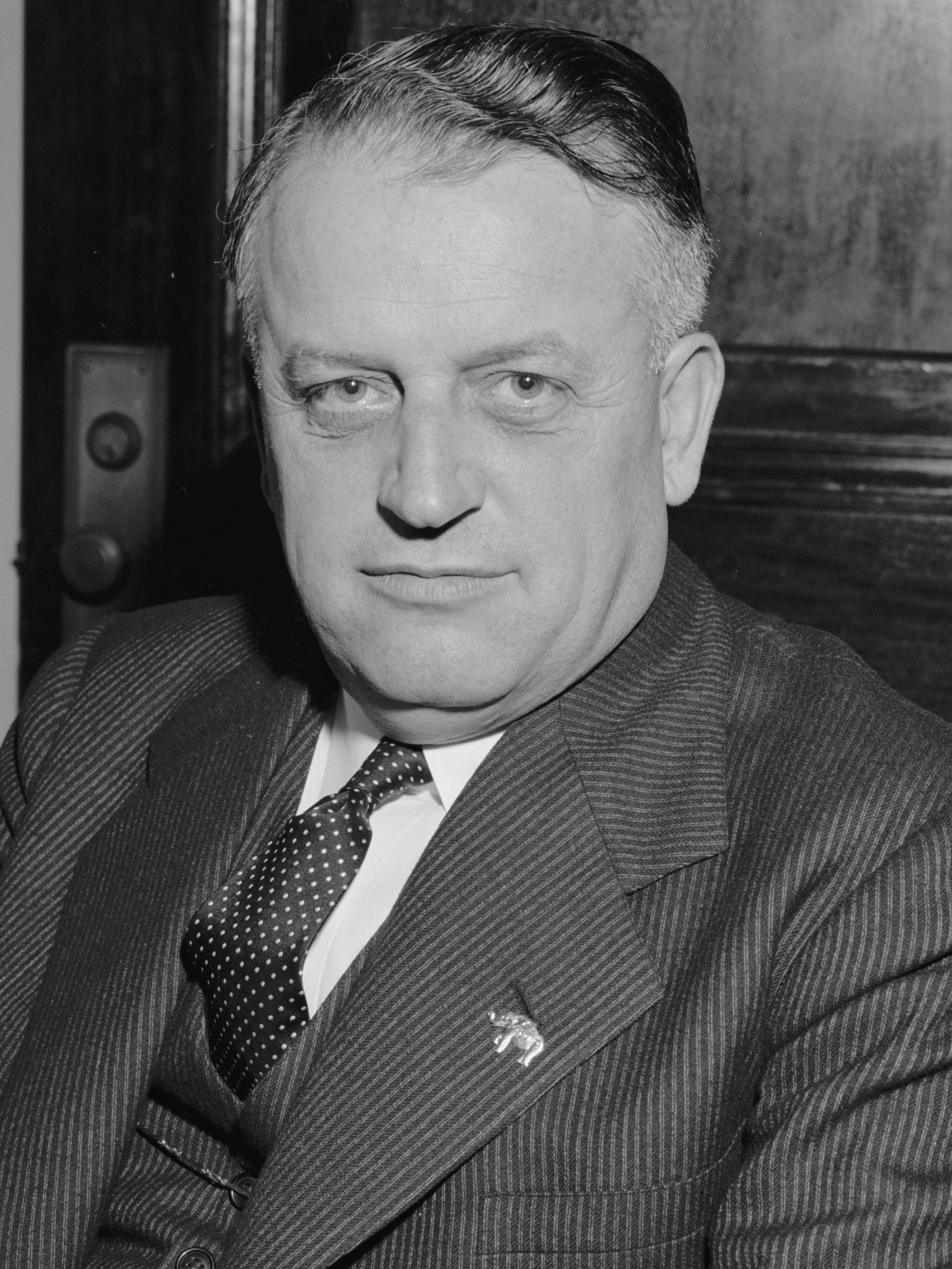

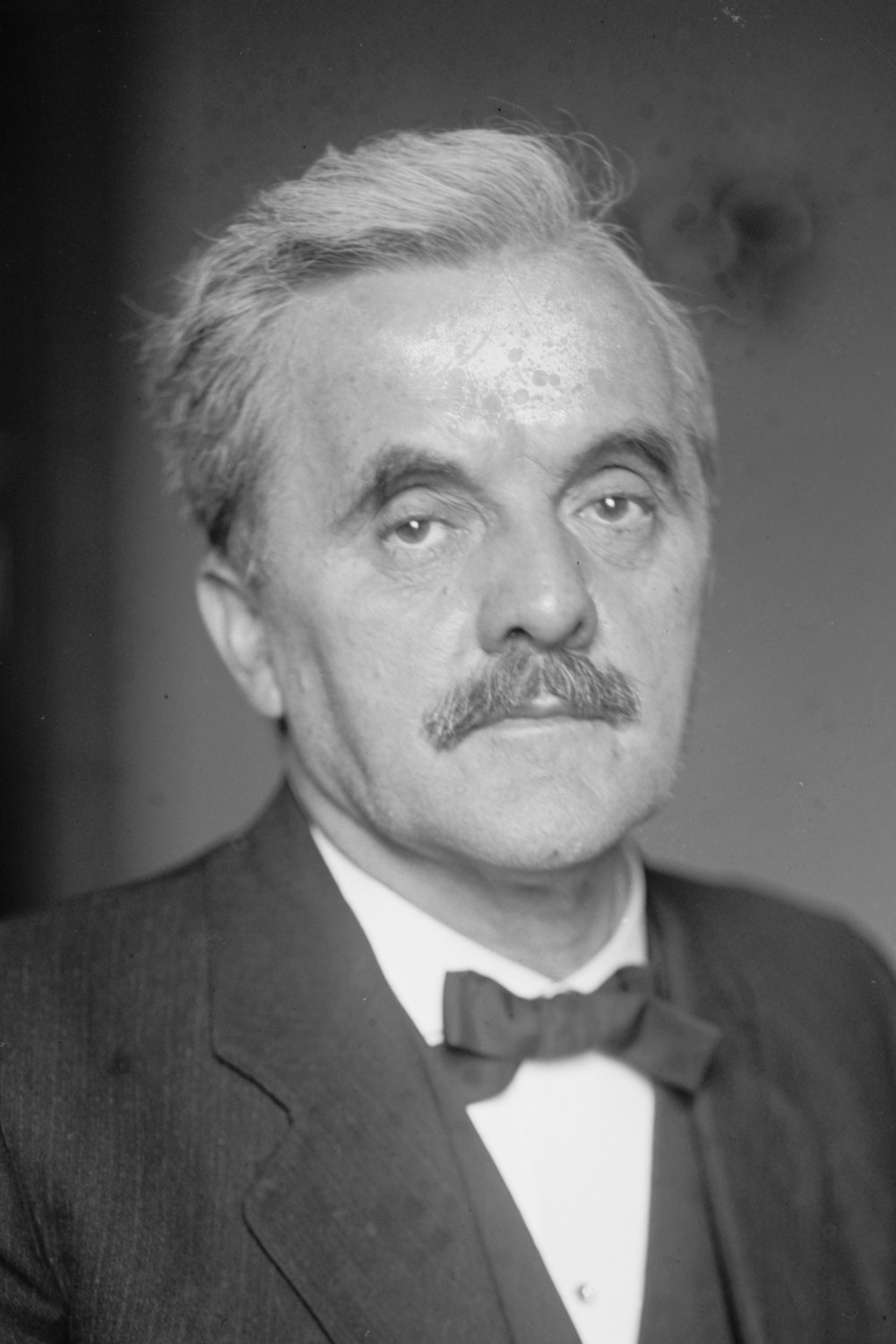

Nominee	Kenneth Wherry	George Norris	Foster May
Party	Republican	Independent	Democratic
Popular vote	186,207	108,899	83,763
Percentage	48.98%	28.63%	22.03%
- County results Wherry: 30–40% 40–50% 50–60% 60–70% 70–80% Norris: 30–40% 40–50% May: 30–40%
U.S. senator before election
George W. Norris
Independent
Elected U.S. Senator
Kenneth Wherry
Republican

The 1942 United States Senate election in Nebraska was held on November 3, 1942. Incumbent George W. Norris, who was re-elected to his fifth term in 1936 as an independent, ran for a sixth term. He was challenged by Kenneth S. Wherry, the Chairman of the Nebraska Republican Party, and Democratic nominee Foster May, a prominent radio announcer. While Norris relied on Democratic support in his previous campaign, he did not receive it in 1942, and unlike in 1936, his Republican opponent largely consolidated the conservative vote. As a result, Norris lost re-election in a landslide, receiving just 29% of the vote to Wherry's 49%. In defeat, Norris remarks, "I would rather go down to my political grave with a clear conscience than ride in the chariot of victory." In part for his honesty with constituents even if it meant defeat. Norris was later featured in John F. Kennedy's Pulitzer Prize-winning Profiles in Courage.

== Republican primary ==
=== Candidates ===
- Kenneth S. Wherry, Chairman of the Nebraska Republican Party, Mayor of Pawnee City
- Hugh Ashmore, former State Senator
- Voyle Rector, businessman

=== Results ===
Republican primary results
Party	Candidate	Votes	%
Republican	Kenneth Wherry	61,915	66.29%
Republican	Hugh Ashmore	20,868	22.34%
Republican	Voyle Rector	10,624	11.37%
Total votes		93,407	100.00%

== Democratic primary ==
=== Candidates ===
- Foster May, Omaha radio announcer
- Harry B. Coffee, U.S. Representative from Nebraska's 5th congressional district
- Terry Carpenter, former U.S. Representative from Nebraska's 5th congressional district, 1936 Democratic nominee for the U.S. Senate
- William Ritchie, Omaha attorney, 1932 Democratic candidate for Governor
- John C. Mullen, former Falls City Attorney
- George W. Olsen, 1940 Democratic candidate for Nebraska's 2nd congressional district
- Lawrence W. Moore, Omaha attorney

=== Results ===
Democratic primary results
Party	Candidate	Votes	%
Democratic	Foster May	36,684	41.10%
Democratic	Harry Coffee	25,953	29.08%
Democratic	Terry Carpenter	13,752	15.41%
Democratic	William Ritchie	5,774	6.47%
Democratic	John C. Mullen	5,211	5.84%
Democratic	George W. Olsen	1,105	1.24%
Democratic	Lawrence W. Moore	784	0.88%
Total votes		89,263	100.00%

== General election ==
=== Results ===
1942 United States Senate election in Nebraska
Party	Candidate	Votes	%	±%
Republican	Kenneth S. Wherry	186,207	48.98%	+11.16%
Independent	George W. Norris (inc.)	108,851	28.63%	−15.19%
Democratic	Foster May	108,391	22.03%	+3.67%
Independent	Albert F. Ruthven	1,348	0.35%	—
Majority		77,356	20.35%	+14.35%
Total votes		380,169	100.00%	
Republican gain from Independent				

== See also ==
- 1942 United States Senate elections
