= George M. Reischmann =

American politician

George M. Reischmann (August 16, 1860 – February 7, 1922) was an American furniture manufacturer and politician from New York.

== Life ==
Reischmann was born on August 16, 1860, in New York City, the son of Michael and Madeline Reischmann. Michael was a German immigrant from Steinalben who immigrated to America in 1850, fought in the American Civil War, and established a furniture manufacturing company.

Reischmann lived in the eastern district of Brooklyn since 1872. He began working for his father in 1880 and learned about cabinet making. He spent the next several years working in his father's company in various capacities. In 1893, he and his brothers joined their father's furniture manufacturing firm as Reischmann & Sons. When his father died, he became head of the company.

In January 1920, Reischmann retired from the company. Later that year, he was elected to the New York State Senate as a Republican, representing New York's 9th State Senate district. He served in the Stat Senate in 1921 and 1922.

Reischmann's wife's name was Catherine. Their children were George and Lillian. He was a member of the Royal Arcanum, the Owls, the Bushwick and Unity Republican clubs, and the Ridgewood Board of Trade.

Reischmann died of diabetes on February 7, 1922, in Jeffersonville, New York. He was buried in St. John's Cemetery.

New York State Senate
Preceded by Charles E. Russell	New York State Senate; 9th District; 1921-1922	Succeeded by Charles E. Russell
