= Irving W. Twiford =

American politician

- Twiford in 1970

Member of the Wyoming House of Representatives from Crook County
- In office 1951–1952
- Preceded by: Bert W. Evans
- Succeeded by: Leslie W. Hauber

Personal details
- Born: Irving Washington Twiford; February 2, 1898 Oshkosh, Nebraska, U.S.
- Died: December 9, 1988 (aged 90) Wheatland, Wyoming, U.S.
- Party: Democratic
- Spouse(s): Hazel Reed (m. 1918; died. 1960) Oral Winslow (m. 1976)
- Children: 2

Irving Washington Twiford (February 2, 1898 – December 9, 1988) was an American politician. A member of the Democratic Party, he served in the Wyoming House of Representatives from 1951 to 1952.

== Life and career ==
Twiford was born in Oshkosh, Nebraska, the son of John and Jennie Twiford. He worked as a rancher in Moorcroft, Wyoming.

Twiford served in the Wyoming House of Representatives from 1951 to 1952. During his service in the House, in 1951, he served on the agriculture and education committees along with representatives Otis Wright and J. W. Myers.

== Death ==
Twiford died on December 9, 1988 in Wheatland, Wyoming, at the age of 90. He was buried at Horseshoe Cemetery.
