= Kenneth S. Wherry =

American politician (1892–1951)

Kenneth Wherry
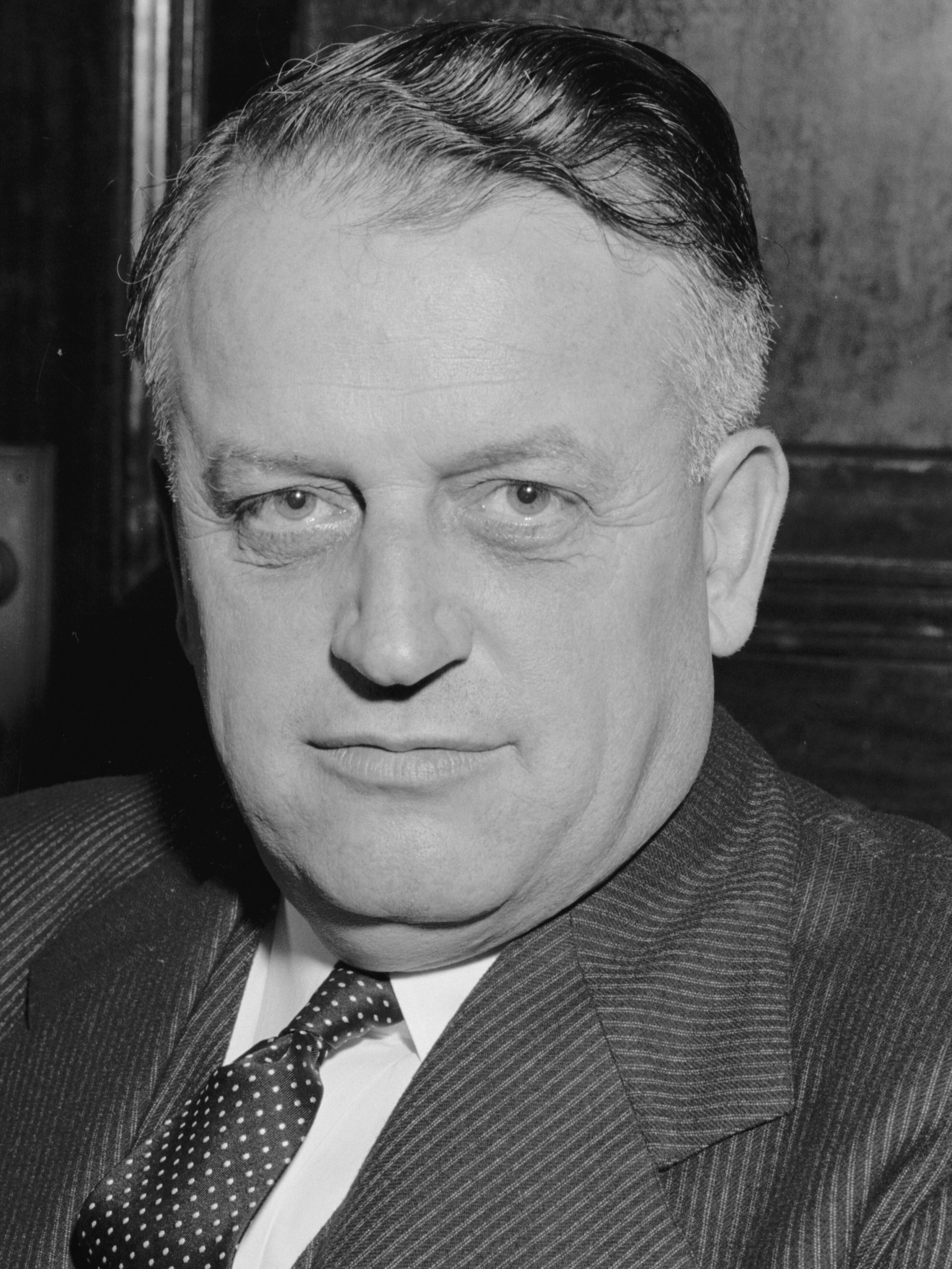
- Wherry in 1940

United States Senator from Nebraska
- In office January 3, 1943 – November 29, 1951
- Preceded by: George W. Norris
- Succeeded by: Fred Seaton
Senate leadership positions
Senate Minority Leader
In office January 3, 1949 – November 29, 1951
Deputy	Leverett Saltonstall
Preceded by	Alben W. Barkley
Succeeded by	Styles Bridges
Leader of the Senate Republican Conference
In office January 3, 1949 – November 29, 1951
Deputy	Leverett Saltonstall
Preceded by	Wallace H. White
Succeeded by	Styles Bridges
Senate Majority Whip
In office January 3, 1947 – January 3, 1949
Leader	Wallace H. White
Preceded by	J. Lister Hill
Succeeded by	Francis J. Myers
Senate Minority Whip
In office January 3, 1943 – January 3, 1947
Leader	Charles L. McNary; Wallace H. White
Preceded by	Felix Hebert (1935)
Succeeded by	Scott W. Lucas

Member of the Nebraska State Senate from the 16th district
- In office January 1, 1929 – January 3, 1933
- Preceded by: Loren H. Laughlin
- Succeeded by: John S. Callan

Personal details
- Born: February 28, 1892 Liberty, Nebraska, U.S.
- Died: November 29, 1951 (aged 59) Washington, D.C., U.S.
- Party: Republican
- Spouse: Marjorie Colwell
- Children: 1 son 1 daughter
- Education: University of Nebraska–Lincoln (BA); Harvard University

Military service
- Allegiance: United States
- Branch/service: United States Navy
- Years of service: 1917–1918
- Unit: Flying Corps
- Battles/wars: World War I

Kenneth Spicer Wherry (February 28, 1892 – November 29, 1951) was an American businessman, attorney, and politician. A member of the Republican Party, he served as a U.S. senator from Nebraska from 1943 until his death in 1951; he was the minority leader for the last two years.

== Early life ==
Wherry was the third of five children born in Liberty, Nebraska, to David Emery and Jessie (née Comstock) Wherry. He received his early education at public schools in Pawnee City, and graduated from the University of Nebraska (where he was a member of Beta Theta Pi fraternity) in 1914. From 1915 to 1916, he studied business administration at Harvard Business School. During World War I, he served in the U.S. Navy Flying Corps (1917–18).

Following his military service, Wherry began a business career selling automobiles, furniture, and livestock; he was also a licensed undertaker with offices in Nebraska and Kansas. He also studied law and, after being admitted to the bar, entered private practice in Pawnee City.

== Political career ==
Wherry entered politics as a member of Pawnee City's city council, serving in 1927 and 1929. He was the mayor from 1929 to 1931, simultaneously serving as a member of the state senate from 1929 to 1933. Wherry was an unsuccessful candidate for the Republican nomination for governor in 1932 and for U.S. Senator in 1934.

In 1938, Wherry was again elected mayor of Pawnee City, serving until he left for Washington and the U.S. Senate. He was chairman of the Nebraska Republican Party from 1939 to 1942, and Western Director for the Republican National Committee from 1941 to 1942.

=== U.S. Senator ===
In 1942, Wherry was elected to the U.S. Senate, unseating incumbent George W. Norris. He was reelected in 1948 and served until his death. He served as Republican whip from 1944 to 1949 and minority leader from 1949 to 1951. He was also one of the few postwar politicos to see the plight of the defeated Germans. "The American people should know once and for all that as a result of this government’s official policy they are being made...accomplices in the crime of mass starvation...Germany is the only nation subjected to a deliberate starvation policy..."

In 1945, Wherry was among the seven senators who opposed full U.S. entry into the United Nations.

Wherry also backed, with Senator Homer Capehart of Indiana, legislation for building military family housing in the post-World War II era, when there were critical shortages of such housing.

Wherry represented the isolationist views of his large German-American constituency. He intensely opposed international activities by the federal government, including entry into World War II, the Cold War, and the Korea War. He vigorously opposed any loans or aid to Europe. He did not believe that the Soviet Union threatened Nebraska's interests, and he strongly opposed the Truman Doctrine, and NATO. Wherry believed that it made no sense to oppose communism by supporting the socialist governments in Western Europe; and that American goods would reach Russia and increase its war potential.

Wherry was the unsuccessful leader in the fight to block the Marshall Plan in Congress in early 1948. Congress, under the control of Republicans, agreed to the Marshall Plan and its funding for multiple reasons. The 20-member conservative isolationist wing of the party was led by Wherry. Wherry and his men argued that it would be a wasteful "operation rat-hole." He was outmaneuvered by the internationalist wing, led by Senator Arthur H. Vandenberg. Vandenberg admitted there was no certainty that the plan would succeed, but said it would halt economic chaos, sustain Western civilization, and stop further Soviet expansion. Senator Robert A. Taft, the most prominent conservative, hedged on the issue. He said it was without economic justification; however it was "absolutely necessary" in "the world battle against communism." In the end, only 17 senators voted against the Marshall Plan on March 13, 1948.

Whatever the issue, Wherry could be counted on as a strong opponent of the presidency of Harry Truman.

In 1950, Robert A. Taft's Fair Employment Practice Committee bill was filibustered in the U.S. Senate. Wherry joined most Republicans in supporting cloture, although cloture was not invoked.

Wherry was strongly opposed to homosexuals serving the US government. In 1950, he asked his Senate colleagues "can [you] think of a person who could be more dangerous to the United States of America than a pervert?" In a 1950 interview, he told Max Lerner that "You can't hardly separate homosexuals from subversives" and "But look Lerner, we're both Americans, aren't we? I say, let's get these fellows [closeted gay men in government positions] out of the government."

He publicized his fear that Adolf Hitler had given Joseph Stalin a list of closeted homosexuals in government, which he believed Stalin would use to blackmail these same homosexuals into becoming Soviet spies. In the spring of 1950, Wherry joined Senator Lister Hill, a Democrat from Alabama, in a congressional investigation of homosexuals in government, particularly the Department of State. He was particularly concerned with communist influence, saying "Only the most naive could believe that the Communists' fifth column in the United States would neglect to propagate and use homosexuals to gain their treacherous ends."

=== Buchenwald concentration camp ===
On April 11, 1945, US forces liberated the Buchenwald concentration camp, which was established in 1937 and caused the deaths of at least 56,545 people. General Eisenhower left rotting corpses unburied so a visiting group of U.S. legislators could truly understand the horror of the atrocities. This group was visiting Buchenwald to inspect the camp and learn firsthand about the enormity of the Nazi Final Solution and treatment of other prisoners. Wherry visited the camp along with Alben W. Barkley, Ed Izac, John M. Vorys, Dewey Short, C. Wayland Brooks, General Omar N. Bradley, and journalists Joseph Pulitzer, Norman Chandler, William I. Nichols and Julius Ochs Adler.

== Death ==
Wherry died in Washington in 1951 at age 59, while serving as Republican Floor Leader. Recovering from abdominal surgery a few weeks earlier, he felt ill and was admitted to George Washington University Hospital and died of pneumonia several hours later.

The fifteenth Senate term for Nebraska's Class 2 seat, from January 3, 1949, to January 3, 1955, was unusual in that it saw six senators occupy the seat, beginning with Wherry.

== See also ==
- List of members of the United States Congress who died in office (1950–1999)

U.S. Senate
Preceded by George William Norris	U.S. senator (Class 2) from Nebraska; January 3, 1943 – November 29, 1951; Served alongside: Hugh A. Butler	Succeeded by Fred Andrew Seaton
Preceded by Felix Hebert; Rhode Island (Position vacant 1935–1943)	Senate Minority Whip; January 3, 1943 – January 3, 1947	Succeeded by Scott W. Lucas; Illinois
Preceded by J. Lister Hill; Alabama	Senate Majority Whip; January 3, 1947 – January 3, 1949	Succeeded by Francis Myers; Pennsylvania
Preceded by Alben W. Barkley; Kentucky	Senate Minority Leader; January 3, 1949 – November 29, 1951	Succeeded by Styles Bridges; New Hampshire
Party political offices
Preceded by Robert G. Simmons	Republican nominee for U.S. Senator from Nebraska; 1942, 1948	Succeeded by Dwight Griswold
Preceded by Felix Hebert; Rhode Island (Position vacant 1935–1943)	Senate Republican Whip; January 3, 1943 – January 3, 1949	Succeeded by Leverett Saltonstall; Massachusetts
Preceded by Wallace H. White, Jr. Maine	Senate Republican Leader; January 3, 1949 – November 29, 1951	Succeeded by Styles Bridges; New Hampshire
