= George W. Olsen =

American perennial candidate

Personal details
- Born: December 13, 1881 Zealand, Denmark
- Died: June 27, 1954 (aged 72) Northampton, Massachusetts, U.S.
- Party: Democratic

George Walter Olsen (December 13, 1881 – June 27, 1954) was a perennial candidate who gained the Democratic nomination for Governor of Nebraska in a closely contested primary in 1944 but ultimately lost the race to Republican incumbent governor Dwight Griswold.

== Early life ==
Olsen was born in Zealand, Denmark, and came to the United States at the age of three. After completing one year of high school, he took up farming and farmed until 1911. He later worked many jobs throughout his life including as a baggage handler, expressman, poultryman, truck driver, busboy, sewing machine salesman, cream buyer, and insurance agent.

== Perennial candidate ==
Olsen's first filing for public office came in 1912, when he filed to run for a seat in the Nebraska Senate. Looking back at this race in 1944, Olsen remarked that "he thought he ran for state senator at that time, but he wasn't certain because he has had so many races since then." Olsen later ran for county commissioner in Cass County, Nebraska, and also ran for Nebraska state senator again in 1930.

In 1932, Olsen entered the race for Nebraska Governor in the Democratic primary against incumbent governor Charles W. Bryan and other candidates. Olsen finished third with only 2.9% of the vote.

In 1940, Olsen ran unsuccessfully in the Democratic primaries for US Representative for Nebraska's 1st congressional district, losing to the eventual nominee Henry C. Luckey. Olsen then ran unsuccessfully in the Democratic primaries for United States Senator in 1942, 1946, and 1948.

== Gubernatorial campaign of 1944 ==
In 1944, Olsen decided to once again seek the Democratic nomination for Governor of Nebraska. At the time, Olsen was employed as a busboy in the cafeteria at the Glenn L. Martin Bomber Plant. He faced Sidney, Nebraska, attorney Patrick J. Heaton and won the race with an even 20,000 votes, winning the race by only 374 votes. His success in the primary campaign was attributed to his promise to dedicate all the state's resources to the war effort.

After winning the primary, Olsen did not actively campaign, gave no speeches, had little contact with the Nebraska Democratic Party, and rarely made appearances for campaign events. Instead, Olsen would make nightly trips to Omaha to contact reporters, joke around with them, and offer "catchy campaign remarks." Olsen said he avoided the general public "upon the advice of [his] advisers," whom he would not name. Olsen also engaged in writing letters to the various newspapers of the state promoting his positions and championing his mathematical formula to "square a circle." One newspaper remarked that Olsen "campaigned by deluging Omaha newspaper men with mathematical formulae attempting to prove his circle-squaring stunt." Another newspaper remarked that his letters were "filled with angles, fractions, straight lines, decimal points, and mathematical formulae attempting to prove his contention that he can square a circle."

On political issues, Olsen voiced his opposition to big business, specifically Montgomery Ward, as well as opposition to prohibition policies and opposition to a statewide gasoline tax which had been proposed. Olsen released a short platform promising to "pledge the entire resources of Nebraska, in any manner deemed necessary by the national government to fight our war to the finish as quickly as it can be done." He also stated in his platform, using an allusion to the Declaration of Independence, that "a decent respect for the opinion of mankind impels" him to set forth his qualifications, about which he said that "every newspaper publisher ought to know by this time that I have the proper qualifications."

During the campaign, Olsen made a stop at Omaha Central High School to demonstrate his "squaring a circle" formula to students who were members of Central High's mathematics society. About 175 students crowded into a study hall to watch Olsen demonstrate his formula, but only about a dozen remained for the full two hours while the students questioned Olsen about the assumptions he was making. The president of the mathematics society was quoted as saying, "It was interesting but I don't think the students were convinced."

In November, Olsen was eventually routed by incumbent governor Dwight Griswold, winning only 23.9% of the vote statewide and carrying zero counties. After the defeat, Olsen simply continued his job as a busboy at the Glenn L. Martin Bomber Plant, saying that "Election returns do not interest me tonight any more than they did on April 11 in the primary returns." Olsen said he wanted to get a "regular night's rest" so that he could resume his work helping to build B-29 bombers.

== Squaring the circle ==
Olsen claimed that he had discovered a mathematical formula to "square a circle," and he made seeking recognition for this a centerpiece of many of his campaigns, including his campaign as the Democratic nominee for Nebraska Governor in 1944. He claimed that his formula "ought to be plain to a child." This was a version of his formula as published in several newspapers:

All dimensions are derived from the square of the diameter. Therefore, the square of the equilateral must be a proportional square of the diameter or the whole. The square of the diameter, minus the square of the equilateral, equals one-fourth of the area between the sides of the square. One-fourth of this for each mathematical part equals one-sixteenth. Therefore, seven-eighths squared, plus one-sixteenth squared, equals the side of the square in two parts, and also the area of the circle. Seven-eighths squared, plus one-eighth squared, equals .78125 of the whole. This part of the area of the square of the diameter equals the area of the circle, equals seven-eighths plus one-eighth of one side of the square. Seven-eighths squared, plus one-eighth squared of the perimeter of the square of the diameter, equals the circumference of the circle and also .78125 of the perimeter equals three and one-eighths sides of the square of the diameter.

In defending his so-called theorem for squaring a circle, Olsen was quoted as saying, "Either I am a plain damn fool or I know what I am talking about." He also said that he was "ready at any time to square the circle according to the numerical value of pi times the square of the radius in both the accurate and inaccurate values, without the use of a graduated ruler." He also offered to prove it to anyone at any time: "If anyone doubts my ability to do this, they can name the place and date, pay the expenses of the meeting, and if I fail to prove the statement, I will pay the expenses myself." One newspaper recounted sarcastically that "Mathematics professors conceded that finding errors in Olsen's formula would be as difficult as development of the formula itself."

In seeking recognition for his formula, Olsen took it to President Franklin D. Roosevelt who referred him to the National Bureau of Standards. The National Bureau of Standards refused to recognize his formula.

In 1932, Olsen also once wrote to the Omaha World-Herald, asking if they would "find out for him exactly how the number 3.1416, familiarly known as 'pi,' was arrived at mathematically." The editors posted an advertisement containing his request and asked that all readers who wished to respond send replies addressed to Olsen.

== Personal life ==
Olsen was married to Florence Garrett, who preceded him in death. He had four children, including a son named Ralph W. Olsen. Olsen lived most of his life in Otoe and Cass counties. Olsen passed away in Northampton, Massachusetts, on June 27, 1954, at the age of 72.
