= 1962 Nebraska lieutenant gubernatorial election =

Nebraska Elections

- November 6, 1962
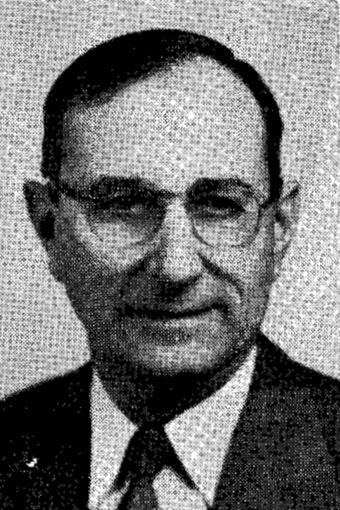

Nominee	Dwight Burney	Rudolph D. Anderson
Party	Republican	Democratic
Popular vote	271,978	176,990
Percentage	60.6%	39.4%
- County results Burney: 50–60% 60–70% 70–80% 80–90% Anderson: 50–60%
Lieutenant Governor before election
Dwight Burney
Republican
Elected Lieutenant Governor
Dwight Burney
Republican

The 1962 Nebraska lieutenant gubernatorial election was held on November 6, 1962, and featured incumbent Nebraska Lieutenant Governor Dwight Burney, a Republican, defeating Democratic nominee Rudolph D. Anderson.

== Democratic primary ==
=== Candidates ===
- Rudolph D. Anderson
- Robert A. Dixon

=== Results ===
Democratic primary results
Party	Candidate	Votes	%
Democratic	Rudolph D. Anderson	45,120	51.40
Democratic	Robert A. Dixon	42,628	48.56
Scattering		35	

== Republican primary ==
=== Candidates ===
- Lester Anderson, former member of the Nebraska Legislature from District 34
- Dwight Burney, incumbent Nebraska Lieutenant Governor

=== Results ===
Republican primary results
Party	Candidate	Votes	%
Republican	Dwight Burney (incumbent)	110,316	73.73
Republican	Lester H. Anderson	39,302	26.27

== General election ==
=== Results ===
Nebraska lieutenant gubernatorial election, 1962
Party	Candidate	Votes	%
Republican	Dwight Burney (incumbent)	271,978	60.58
Democratic	Rudolph D. Anderson	176,990	39.42
Scattering		10	
Total votes		448,978	100.00
Republican hold			

== See also ==
- 1962 Nebraska gubernatorial election
