= Bolivian National Congress, 1960–1962 =

The Bolivian National Congress 1960–1962 was elected on 5 June 1960.

== Chamber of Deputies ==
| Deputy | Party | Department | elected |
|---|---|---|---|
| Roberto Jordán Pando | MNR | Chuquisaca | 1960 |
| Jorge Orozco Lorenzetty | MNR | Chuquisaca | 1960 |
| Horacio Torres Guzmán | MNR | Chuquisaca | 1960 |
| Germán Gutiérrez Ortega | MNR | Chuquisaca | 1960 |
| Manuel Nava Ríos | MNR | Chuquisaca | 1960 |
| Fuad Mujaes Kalaf | MNR | Chuquisaca | 1960 |
| Alejandro Avendaño Flores | MNR | Chuquisaca | 1960 |
| Augusto Céspedes Patzi | MNR | La Paz | 1958 |
| Juan Sanjinés Obando | MNR | La Paz | 1958 |
| Aníbal Aguilar Peñarrieta | MNR | La Paz | 1958 |
| Raúl Murillo Aliaga | MNR (MNRA) | La Paz | 1958 |
| Egberto Ergueta Quiroga | MNR | La Paz | 1958 |
| Saturnino Lima Ticona | MNR | La Paz | 1958 |
| Felipe Dalence García | MNR | La Paz | 1958 |
| Carlos Mercado Arias | MNR | La Paz | 1958 |
| Humberto Lozano Lazcano | MNR | La Paz | 1958 |
| Luis Jofré González | MNR (MNRA) | La Paz | 1958 |
| Guillermo Muñoz de la Barra | MNR | La Paz | 1958 |
| Federico González Gutiérrez | MNR | La Paz | 1958 |
| Bernardino Bilbao Rioja | FSB | La Paz | 1958 |
| Mario Gutiérrez Gutiérrez | FSB | La Paz | 1958 |
| Germán Vera Tapia | MNR (MNRA) | Cochabamba | 1958 |
| Germán Quiroga Galdo | MNR | Cochabamba | 1958 |
| Alfredo Antezana Ríos | MNR | Cochabamba | 1958 |
| Abdón Ugarte Palacios | MNR | Cochabamba | 1958 |
| José Rojos Guevara | MNR (MNRA) | Cochabamba | 1958 |
| Enrique Guzmán Moya | MNR | Cochabamba | 1958 |
| Hugo Montero Mur | MNR | Cochabamba | 1958 |
| Jorge Cañedo Allende | MNR | Cochabamba | 1958 |
| Wálter Revuelta Padilla | MNR | Cochabamba | 1958 |
| Ernesto Ayala Mercado | MNR | Potosí | 1960 |
| Ramón Oliden Ortuño | MNR | Potosí | 1960 |
| Guillermo Bedregal Gutiérrez | MNR | Potosí | 1960 |
| Alfredo Aguirre Bellido | MNR | Potosí | 1960 |
| Gregorio Mendoza Quispe | MNR | Potosí | 1960 |
| Alberto Jara Daza | MNR | Potosí | 1960 |
| Germán Claros Carreño | MNR | Potosí | 1960 |
| Hugo González Rioja | MNR | Potosí | 1960 |
| Gustavo Villegas Cortés | MNR | Potosí | 1960 |
| Ambrosio García Rivera | FSB | Potosí | 1960 |
| Alcibiades Velarde Ortiz | MNR | Santa Cruz | 1960 |
| Edil Sandóval Morón | MNR | Santa Cruz | 1960 |
| Pedro Ribera Méndez | MNR (MNRA) | Santa Cruz | 1960 |
| Carlos Correa Villarroel | MNR | Santa Cruz | 1960 |
| Alfredo Ibáñez Franco | MNR | Santa Cruz | 1960 |
| Salomón Suárez Abrego | MNR | Santa Cruz | 1960 |
| Carmelo Padilla Arteaga | MNR | Santa Cruz | 1960 |
| Jorge Flores Arias | MNR | Santa Cruz | 1960 |
| Carlos Guzmán Pereyra | MNR | Oruro | 1958 |
| Zenón Barrientos Mamani | MNR (MNRA) | Oruro | 1958 |
| Silverio Rodríguez Ajhuacho | MNR | Oruro | 1958 |
| Francisco Candía Zeballos | MNR | Oruro | 1958 |
| Pacífico Monje Castro | MNR | Oruro | 1958 |
| Raúl Larrea Zorrilla | MNR | Oruro | 1958 |
| Gilberto León Rodo | MNR | Tarija | 1958 |
| Jaime Arellano Castañeda | MNR | Tarija | 1958 |
| Ranulfo Molloja Hoyos | MNR | Tarija | 1958 |
| Pedro Rivera Aruzamena | MNR (MNRA) | Tarija | 1958 |
| Mario Roncal Antezana | MNR | Tarija | 1958 |
| Julio Rivera Gutiérrez | MNR | Beni | 1960 |
| Freddy Henrich Balcázar | MNR | Beni | 1960 |
| Hugo Suárez Gómez | MNR | Beni | 1960 |
| Armando Mollinedo Bacarreza | MNR | Beni | 1960 |
| Carmelo Bruckner Moreno | MNR | Beni | 1960 |
| Severiano Julio Castro | MNR | Pando | 1960 |
| Alfredo Franco Guachalla | MNR | Pando | 1960 |
| Federico Arroyo Villegas | MNR | Pando | 1960 |
| Hernán Medeiros Arteaga | MNR | Pando | 1960 |

== Chamber of Senators ==
| Senator | Party | Department | elected |
|---|---|---|---|
| Federico Fortún Sanjinés | MNR | La Paz | 1960 |
| Federico Alvarez Plata | MNR | La Paz | 1960 |
| Fernando Ayala Requena | MNR | Cochabamba | 1960 |
| Gualberto Olmos Arrazolc | MNR | Cochabamba | 1960 |
| Luis Sándoval Morón | MNR | Santa Cruz | 1960 |
| Julio Calvo Cronenboldt | MNR | Santa Cruz | 1960 |
| Rubén Julio Castro | MNR | Pando | 1958 |
| Alberto Lavadenz Ribera | MNR | Pando | 1958 |
| Francisco Mealla Ruíz | MNR | Tarija | 1958 |
| Oscar Donoso López | MNR | Tarija | 1958 |
| Carmelo Cuéllar Jiménez | MNR | Beni | 1958 |
| Humberto Velarde García | MNR | Beni | 1958 |
| José Hugo Vilar | MNR | Chuquisaca | 1956 |
| Ciro Humboldt Barrero | MNR | Chuquisaca | 1956 |
| Mario Torres Calleja | MNR | Oruro | 1956 |
| Francisco Morales Pérez | MNR | Oruro | 1956 |
| Leónidas Sánchez Arana | MNR | Potosí | 1956 |
| Juan Lechín Oquendo (to 1960) | MNR | Potosí | 1956 |

== Presidents of the National Congress ==
| President | Party | | |
|---|---|---|---|
| Juan Lechín Oquendo | MNR | 6 August 1960 | August 1962 |

FSB – Bolivian Socialist Falange.

MNR – Revolutionary Nationalist Movement.

MNRA – Authentic Nationalist Revolutionary Movement (a faction of the MNR, 1959).
