= Harry F. Russell =

American politician (1890–1972)

Member of the Nebraska Legislature from the 31st district
- In office March 27, 1944 – January 2, 1945
- Preceded by: Harry Bowman
- Succeeded by: Fred A. Seaton

Personal details
- Born: June 6, 1890 Kenesaw, Nebraska
- Died: August 27, 1972 (aged 82) Hastings, Nebraska
- Party: Republican
- Spouse(s): Esther Fuhr (m. 1926; died 1946) Agnetha McCrady (m. 1955)
- Children: 1
- Education: Hastings College (A.B.)
- Occupation: Lawyer, investment banker

Military service
- Allegiance: United States
- Branch/service: United States Army

Harry Frederick Russell (June 6, 1890 – August 27, 1972) was a Republican politician from Nebraska who served as a member of the Nebraska Legislature from the 31st district from 1944 to 1945.

== Early life ==
Russell was born in Kenesaw, Nebraska, in 1890. He attended Hastings College, and graduated with his bachelor's degree in 1910. Russell worked for the Exchange National Bank in Hastings as an investment banker and served in the U.S. Army during World War I. He began practicing as an attorney in 1930. Russell was a trustee of Hastings College and was politically active, serving as the chairman of the Adams County Republican Central Committee.

== Nebraska Legislature ==
In 1943, State Senator Harry Bowman died, creating a vacancy in the 31st district. Governor Dwight Griswold was unable to fill the vacancy until he called a special session in 1944, at which point he appointed Russell to serve out the remaining months of Bowman's term. Russell was sworn in on March 27, 1944, and he did not seek a full term in the 1944 election.

== Personal life ==
Russell married Esther Fuhr in 1926, and had one child with her. She died in 1946, and he subsequently married Agnetha McCrady in 1955.

== Death ==
Russell died on August 27, 1972.
