= 1962 Jordanian general election =

General elections were held in Jordan on 24 and 25 November 1962. As political parties were banned at the time, all candidates ran as independents.
