= 1962 Colombian parliamentary election =

Parliamentary elections were held in Colombia on 18 March 1962 to elect the Senate and Chamber of Representatives. Under the National Front agreement, only the Conservative Party and the Liberal Party were allowed to contest the elections, with each party allocated 50% of the seats in both houses. As a result, the main contest at the elections was between factions within each party.

== Results ==
=== Senate ===
Party and faction		Votes	%	Seats	+/–
Colombian; Liberal; Party	Oficialistas	1,076,151	34.96	37	–
Colombian; Liberal; Party	Liberal Revolutionary Movement	601,063	19.53	12	–
Colombian; Liberal; Party	Others	2,376	0.08	0	–
Colombian; Liberal; Party	Total	1,679,590	54.57	49	+9
Colombian; Conservative; Party	Unionistas	797,341	25.91	31	New
Colombian; Conservative; Party	Doctrinarios	491,731	15.98	16	New
Colombian; Conservative; Party	National Popular Alliance	104,829	3.41	2	New
Colombian; Conservative; Party	Others	4,450	0.14	0	–
Colombian; Conservative; Party	Total	1,398,351	45.43	49	+9
Total		3,077,941	100.00	98	+18
Valid votes		3,077,941	99.93		
Invalid/blank votes		2,114	0.07		
Total votes		3,080,055	100.00		
Registered voters/turnout		5,338,868	57.69		
Source: Nohlen

=== Chamber of Representatives ===
Party and faction		Votes	%	Seats	+/–
Colombian; Liberal; Party	Oficialistas	1,081,103	35.01	59	+1
Colombian; Liberal; Party	Liberal Revolutionary Movement	601,926	19.49	33	+15
Colombian; Liberal; Party	Others	2,502	0.08	0	–
Colombian; Liberal; Party	Total	1,685,531	54.58	92	+16
Colombian; Conservative; Party	Alzaospinnistas	794,688	25.73	50	+13
Colombian; Conservative; Party	Doctrinarios	487,733	15.79	36	–2
Colombian; Conservative; Party	National Popular Alliance	115,587	3.74	6	New
Colombian; Conservative; Party	Others	4,778	0.15	0	–
Colombian; Conservative; Party	Total	1,402,786	45.42	92	+16
Total		3,088,317	100.00	184	+32
Valid votes		3,088,317	99.94		
Invalid/blank votes		1,886	0.06		
Total votes		3,090,203	100.00		
Registered voters/turnout		5,338,868	57.88		
Source: Nohlen
