= Charles E. Russell =

American politician

Charles Edmund Russell (October 21, 1868 in Saugerties, Ulster County, New York – November 30, 1960) was an American lawyer and politician from New York.

== Life ==
He was the son of Edmund McCarthy Russell (1840–1873) and Ellen H. (Lusk) Russell (1841–1900), and married Louise Matilda Clarke. Charles was a member of Delta Chi fraternity.

Russell entered politics as a Democrat.

Russell was a member of the New York State Senate (9th D.) in 1919 and 1920.

He was again a member of the State Senate in 1923 and 1924; and was Chairman of the Committee on Banks.

On January 7, 1926, he was elected to the State Senate to fill the vacancy caused by the resignation of Frank E. Johnson. Russell remained in the State Senate until 1929, sitting in the 149th, 150th, 151st and 152nd New York State Legislatures. He resigned his seat on December 3, 1929, after having been elected to the Brooklyn City Court.

He died on November 30, 1960; and was buried at the Mountain View Cemetery in Saugerties.

== Sources ==
- SPECIAL ELECTION WON BY DEMOCRATS in NYT on January 8, 1926 (subscription required)
- CHARLES RUSSELL, RETIRED JUSTICE in NYT on December 1, 1960 (subscription required)

New York State Senate
Preceded by Robert R. Lawson	New York State Senate; 9th District; 1919–1920	Succeeded by George M. Reischmann
Preceded by George M. Reischmann	New York State Senate; 9th District; 1923–1924	Succeeded by Frank E. Johnson
Preceded by Frank E. Johnson	New York State Senate; 9th District; 1926–1929	Succeeded by Henry L. O'Brien
