= 1962 Cleveland mayoral special election =

Cleveland mayoral election special election, 1962
- November 6, 1962
Nominee	Ralph S. Locher	Willard W. Brown
Party	Democratic	Republican
Popular vote	179,376	61,910
Percentage	74.34%	25.66%
Mayor before election
Ralph S. Locher
Democratic
Elected mayor
Ralph S. Locher
Democratic

The Cleveland mayoral special election of 1962 saw the election of incumbent mayor Ralph S. Locher, who became mayor after Anthony J. Celebrezze resigned as mayor in 1962 to serve as United States Secretary of Health, Education, and Welfare under President John F. Kennedy.

== General election ==
1962 Cleveland mayoral election (general election)
Party	Candidate	Votes	%
Democratic	Ralph S. Locher (incumbent)	179,376	74.34%
Republican	Willard W. Brown	61,910	25.66%
Turnout		241,286	
