= 1962 Malayan local elections =

Local elections were held in Malaysia in 1962, won by the alliance party

Local elections were held in Malaya in 1962. They were dominated by the Alliance Party, which won 1,788 of the 2,419 seats available.

== Results ==
State	Alliance			Socialist Front			PMIP			PPP			Others			Total seats
State	Votes	%	Seats	Votes	%	Seats	Votes	%	Seats	Votes	%	Seats	Votes	%	Seats	Total seats
Johore		59.9	512			72			0			4			10	598
Kedah		57.4	231			11			16			0			8	266
Kelantan		43.0	88			0			119			0			0	207
Negri Sembilan		55.7	93			23			0			1			7	124
Pahang		66.8	214			19			1			0			9	243
Perak		47.8	460			240			0			226			20	730
Perlis		90.7	24			0			0			0			0	24
Selangor		54.8	166			46			0			4			11	227
Total	–	–	1,788	–	–	195	–	–	136			4	–	–	11	2,419
Source: Silcock
