= Crescent Lake National Wildlife Refuge =

National Wildlife Refuge in Nebraska

- IUCN category IV (habitat/species management area)
- Location within Nebraska Location within the United States
- Location: Garden County, Nebraska, USA
- Nearest city: Alliance, NE
- Coordinates: 41°43′43″N 102°20′38″W
- Area: 45,818 acres (18,542 ha)
- Established: 1931
- Governing body: U.S. Fish and Wildlife Service
- Website: Crescent Lake National Wildlife Refuge

Crescent Lake National Wildlife Refuge is located in the U.S. state of Nebraska and includes 45,818 acres (185 km^{2}). The refuge contains the largest protected continuous sand dunes in the U.S. A dozen small lakes and numerous ponds are fed by underground aquifers in areas where the sand dunes are below the water table. Some of the dunes are covered in shrubs and grasses, while others are completely bare. After the end of the Pinedale glaciation, the Holocene glacial retreat exposed the sand dunes that had been deposited in their current location by the vast continental glaciers. This refuge manages the North Platte National Wildlife Refuge and together they form the Crescent Lake National Wildlife Refuge Complex.

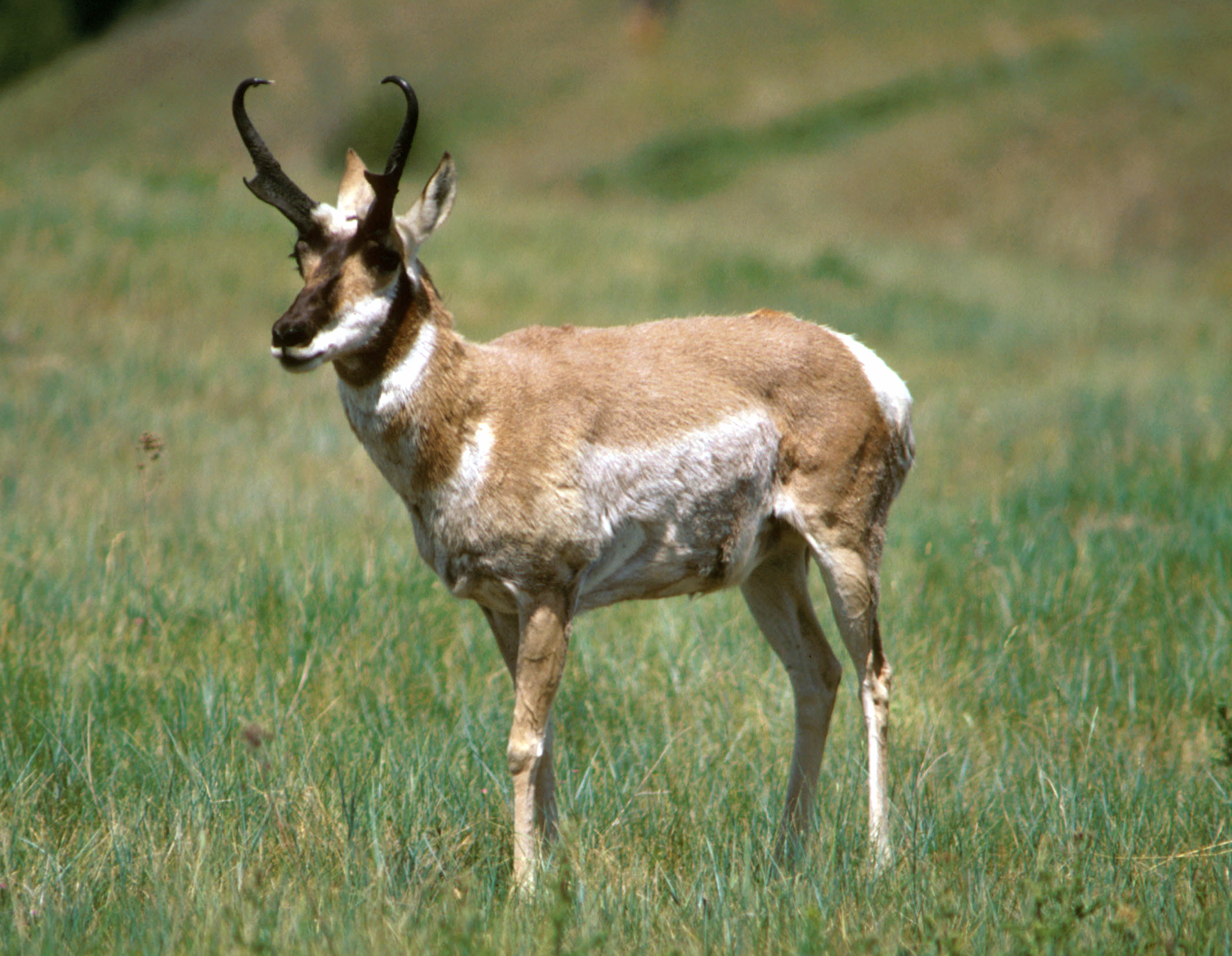
The Pronghorn is often mistakenly referred to as the antelope

Crescent Lake NWR was protected in 1931 to ensure the wetlands would continue to be protected, providing migratory bird species and other animals a safe haven. As many as twenty Bald eagle pairs have been known to spend part of the year within the refuge, and along another 200 observed bird species, the refuge is considered one of the finest in the U.S. for birders. The grasses support a large group of Pronghorn as well as Mule and White-tailed deer. Coyote, bobcat, beaver, river otter, swift fox, prairie dog and raccoon are also found on the refuge. Sport fishing is popular with Yellow Perch, Walleye and Largemouth bass being the more commonly sought. Though early succession is just starting to be re-established due to the Morrill fire that burned the majority of the refuge on March 12, 2026.

Crescent Lake NWR is located approximately 28 miles (45 km) north of Oshkosh, Nebraska. From U.S. Highway 26, turn north on West Second. Proceed north out of town and follow directional signs to the Refuge headquarters. From U.S. Highway 2, turn south just east of Lakeside, Nebraska.
