= Garden County Junior-Senior High School =

Location
- 200 West 4th Street; Oshkosh, Nebraska 69154; United States; 41.404062°N 102.350178°W

Information
- Established: 1915
- School district: Garden County Schools
- CEEB code: 281810
- Principal: Bruce Hird
- Teaching staff: 13.03 (FTE) (as of 2018-19)
- Grades: 7–12
- Enrollment: 115 (as of 2018-19)
- Student to teacher ratio: 8.83 (as of 2018-19)
- Campus type: Rural
- Colors: Purple, gray and white
- Athletics conference: Minuteman Conference
- Mascot: Eagles
- Newspaper: The Eagle

Garden County Junior-Senior High School is a secondary school in Oshkosh, Nebraska, United States. It is the only high school in Garden County Schools.

== History ==
Public education in Oshkosh dates to around 1900, and the high school was formally established on June 26, 1915.

== Extracurricular activities ==
Student groups and activities at include drama, journalism, speech, student council, and vocal and instrumental music.

The school's teams, known as the Garden County Eagles, compete in basketball, football, golf, track, volleyball, and wrestling.

== Notable alumni ==
- Don Meier, creator of Wild Kingdom
