= 1962 Liechtenstein referendum =

- 25 February 1962

Civic defence law
| For | 25.73% |
| Against | 74.27% |

Game hunting law
| For | 54.64% |
| Against | 45.36% |

A double referendum was held in Liechtenstein on 25 February 1962. The first question was on the subject of the law on civic defence, and was rejected by 74.3% of voters. The second was on the game hunting law, and was approved by 54.6% of voters.

== Results ==
=== Civic defence law ===
| Choice | Votes | % |
|---|---|---|
| For | 687 | 25.7 |
| Against | 1,983 | 74.3 |
| Invalid/blank votes | 201 | – |
| Total | 2,871 | 100 |
| Registered voters/turnout | 3,628 | 79.1 |
Source: Nohlen & Stöver

=== Game hunting law ===
| Choice | Votes | % |
|---|---|---|
| For | 1,424 | 54.6 |
| Against | 1,182 | 45.4 |
| Invalid/blank votes | 266 | – |
| Total | 2,872 | 100 |
| Registered voters/turnout | 3,628 | 79.2 |
Source: Nohlen & Stöver
