= Mumper, Nebraska =

Unincorporated community in Nebraska, United States

Coordinates: 41°45′41″N 102°26′25″W

Mumper is an unincorporated community in Garden County, Nebraska, United States.

== History ==
Mumper was named for a female pioneer settler.

A post office was established in Mumper in 1896, and remained in operation until it was discontinued in 1943.
