= Authentic Revolutionary Nationalist Movement =

The Authentic Revolutionary Nationalist Movement (Spanish: Movimiento Nacionalista Revolucionario Auténtico, MNRA) was a small right-wing political party in Bolivia.

The Authentic Revolutionary Nationalist Movement broke away from the Authentic Revolutionary Party in 1962.

It elected one deputy of National Congress on 4 June 1962.

After the coup d'état on 4 November 1964 the Authentic Revolutionary Nationalist Movement disappeared.
