= Garden County, Nebraska =

County in Nebraska, United States

- County
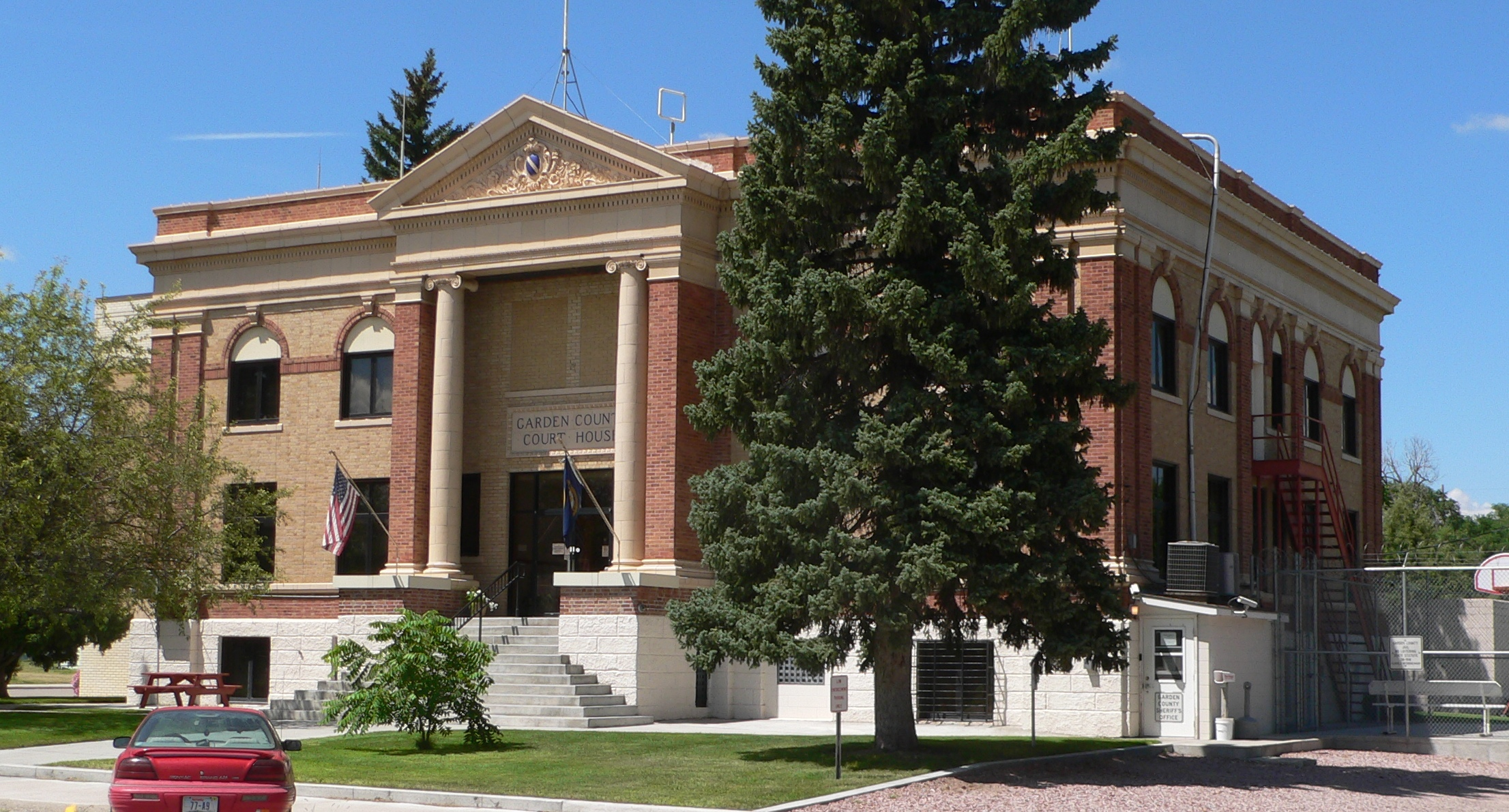
- Garden County Courthouse in Oshkosh

- Location within the U.S. state of Nebraska
- Coordinates: 41°37′N 102°20′W
- Country: United States
- State: Nebraska
- Founded: 1909
- Named for: Garden of Eden
- Seat: Oshkosh
- Largest city: Oshkosh

Area
  - Total: 1,731 sq mi (4,480 km^{2})
  - Land: 1,704 sq mi (4,410 km^{2})
  - Water: 27 sq mi (70 km^{2}) 1.5%

Population (2020)
  - Total: 1,874
  - Estimate (2025): 1,804 ▼
  - Density: 1.100/sq mi (0.4246/km^{2})
- Time zone: UTC−7 (Mountain)
  - Summer (DST): UTC−6 (MDT)
- Congressional district: 3rd
- Website: gardencounty.ne.gov

Garden County is a county in the U.S. state of Nebraska. As of the 2020 United States census, the population was 1,874. Its county seat is Oshkosh.

In the Nebraska license plate system, Garden County is represented by the prefix 77 (it had the seventy-seventh-largest number of vehicles registered in the state when the license plate system was established in 1922).

== History ==
Garden County was formed in 1909 by popular vote. Voters in the general election of November 2, 1909, approved making the northern part of Deuel County into its own county. It is said the county was so named in the hope that this land should become the garden of the West or with allusion to the "Garden of Eden".

The county has lost population since the Great Depression and Dust Bowl of the 1930s. The land was homesteaded for family farms that often turned out to be too small for subsistence farming under the arid conditions of the region. In the early decades of settlement by immigrants and migrants from the East, farmers did not know how to work the land on the prairies. Tons of topsoil were lost after droughts.

== Geography ==
The North Platte River runs ESE through the south part of Garden County. Since the county is in the western portion of Nebraska, its residents observe Mountain Time. The eastern two-thirds portion of the state observes Central Time.

According to the US Census Bureau, the county has a total area of 1,731 square miles (4,480 km^{2}), of which 1,704 square miles (4,410 km^{2}) is land and 27 square miles (70 km^{2}) (1.5%) is water.

=== Major highways ===
- U.S. Highway 26
- Nebraska Highway 27
- Nebraska Highway 92

=== Adjacent counties ===
- Sheridan County - north
- Grant County - east
- Arthur County - east
- Keith County - southeast
- Deuel County - south
- Cheyenne County - southwest
- Morrill County - west

=== Protected areas ===
- Ash Hollow State Historical Park
- Clear Creek State Waterfowl Management Area (partial)
- Crescent Lake National Wildlife Refuge

== Demographics ==
Historical population
Census	Pop.	Note	%±
1910	3,538		—
1920	4,572		29.2%
1930	5,099		11.5%
1940	4,680		−8.2%
1950	4,114		−12.1%
1960	3,472		−15.6%
1970	2,929		−15.6%
1980	2,802		−4.3%
1990	2,460		−12.2%
2000	2,292		−6.8%
2010	2,057		−10.3%
2020	1,874		−8.9%
2025 (est.)	1,804	▼	−3.7%
US Decennial Census; 1790-1960 1900-1990; 1990-2000 2010 2020 2022

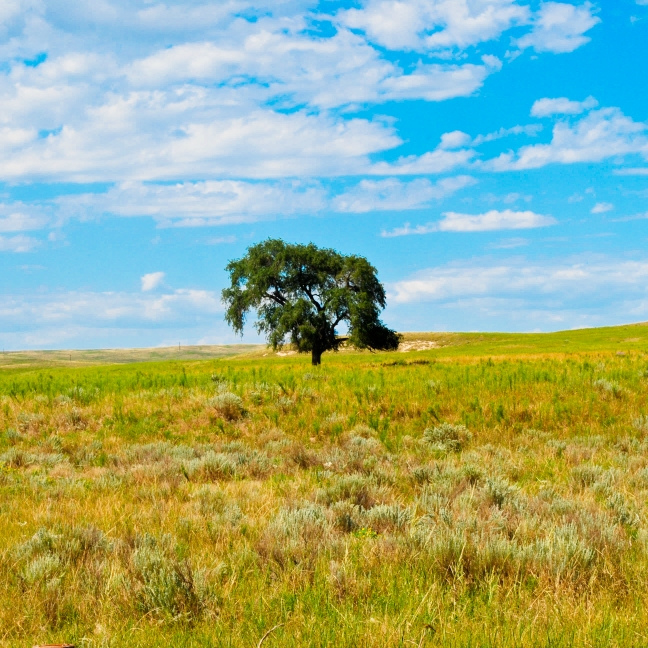
Lone tree on the prairie, on Rt 92 near Lisco

=== 2020 census ===
As of the 2020 census, the county had a population of 1,874. The median age was 51.1 years. 18.9% of residents were under the age of 18 and 27.7% of residents were 65 years of age or older. For every 100 females there were 101.7 males, and for every 100 females age 18 and over there were 96.0 males age 18 and over.

The racial makeup of the county was 93.3% White, 0.4% Black or African American, 0.2% American Indian and Alaska Native, 0.1% Asian, 0.1% Native Hawaiian and Pacific Islander, 2.1% from some other race, and 3.9% from two or more races. Hispanic or Latino residents of any race comprised 4.7% of the population.

0.0% of residents lived in urban areas, while 100.0% lived in rural areas.

There were 883 households in the county, of which 20.6% had children under the age of 18 living with them and 24.6% had a female householder with no spouse or partner present. About 36.5% of all households were made up of individuals and 20.3% had someone living alone who was 65 years of age or older.

There were 1,181 housing units, of which 25.2% were vacant. Among occupied housing units, 69.2% were owner-occupied and 30.8% were renter-occupied. The homeowner vacancy rate was 3.3% and the rental vacancy rate was 7.1%.

=== 2000 census ===
As of the 2000 United States census, there were 2,292 people, 1,020 households, and 658 families in the county. The population density was 1.3 people per square mile (0.50 people/km^{2}). There were 1,298 housing units at an average density of 0.8 units per square mile (0.31/km^{2}). The racial makeup of the county was 98.34% White, 0.13% Black or African American, 0.26% Native American, 0.26% Asian, 0.52% from other races, and 0.48% from two or more races. 1.44% of the population were Hispanic or Latino of any race. 43.5% were of German, 10.0% Irish, 9.6% American and 9.2% English ancestry.

There were 1,020 households, out of which 24.80% had children under the age of 18 living with them, 55.90% were married couples living together, 6.00% had a female householder with no husband present, and 35.40% were non-families. 32.50% of all households were made up of individuals, and 16.20% had someone living alone who was 65 years of age or older. The average household size was 2.19 and the average family size was 2.77.

The county population contained 21.80% under the age of 18, 4.60% from 18 to 24, 22.70% from 25 to 44, 27.00% from 45 to 64, and 24.00% who were 65 years of age or older. The median age was 46 years. For every 100 females there were 94.90 males. For every 100 females age 18 and over, there were 91.40 males.

The median income for a household in the county was $26,458, and the median income for a family was $32,546. Males had a median income of $21,495 versus $17,000 for females. The per capita income for the county was $15,414. About 10.80% of families and 14.80% of the population were below the poverty line, including 22.00% of those under age 18 and 8.70% of those age 65 or over.

== Politics ==
Like much of the Nebraska Panhandle, Garden County has been a Republican-leaning county since the late 20th century. It was one of only two counties that Ben Nelson failed to carry in 1994. In Presidential elections, the last Democratic candidate to carry the county was Franklin D. Roosevelt, in 1932. As part of Nebraska's 3rd congressional district, Garden County has been represented by Republicans since 1961.

United States presidential election results for Garden County, Nebraska
Year	Republican		Democratic		Third party(ies)	
Year	No.	%	No.	%	No.	%
1912	136	15.94%	282	33.06%	435	51.00%
1916	306	32.01%	598	62.55%	52	5.44%
1920	924	66.24%	421	30.18%	50	3.58%
1924	725	46.68%	459	29.56%	369	23.76%
1928	1,470	77.82%	404	21.39%	15	0.79%
1932	768	38.21%	1,204	59.90%	38	1.89%
1936	996	49.63%	986	49.13%	25	1.25%
1940	1,351	64.73%	736	35.27%	0	0.00%
1944	1,248	69.76%	541	30.24%	0	0.00%
1948	923	64.01%	519	35.99%	0	0.00%
1952	1,457	81.03%	341	18.97%	0	0.00%
1956	1,167	77.70%	335	22.30%	0	0.00%
1960	1,376	76.36%	426	23.64%	0	0.00%
1964	1,106	66.43%	559	33.57%	0	0.00%
1968	1,120	78.60%	206	14.46%	99	6.95%
1972	1,161	85.05%	204	14.95%	0	0.00%
1976	928	64.36%	445	30.86%	69	4.79%
1980	1,297	82.09%	202	12.78%	81	5.13%
1984	1,158	85.71%	180	13.32%	13	0.96%
1988	986	72.39%	366	26.87%	10	0.73%
1992	697	53.49%	212	16.27%	394	30.24%
1996	851	65.61%	279	21.51%	167	12.88%
2000	963	79.00%	203	16.65%	53	4.35%
2004	970	81.99%	201	16.99%	12	1.01%
2008	844	74.17%	283	24.87%	11	0.97%
2012	829	75.99%	242	22.18%	20	1.83%
2016	869	80.84%	153	14.23%	53	4.93%
2020	1,016	84.67%	161	13.42%	23	1.92%
2024	949	84.73%	162	14.46%	9	0.80%

== Communities ==
=== City ===
- Oshkosh (county seat)

=== Village ===
- Lewellen

=== Census-designated place ===
- Lisco

=== Other unincorporated places ===
- Mumper
- Rackett

=== Former Communities ===
- Cormick
- Kowanda
- Lutherville
- Lytle
- Orlando
- Penn
- Ruthton
- Warren

== See also ==
- Garden County Junior-Senior High School
- National Register of Historic Places listings in Garden County, Nebraska
