= Oshkosh, Nebraska =

- City
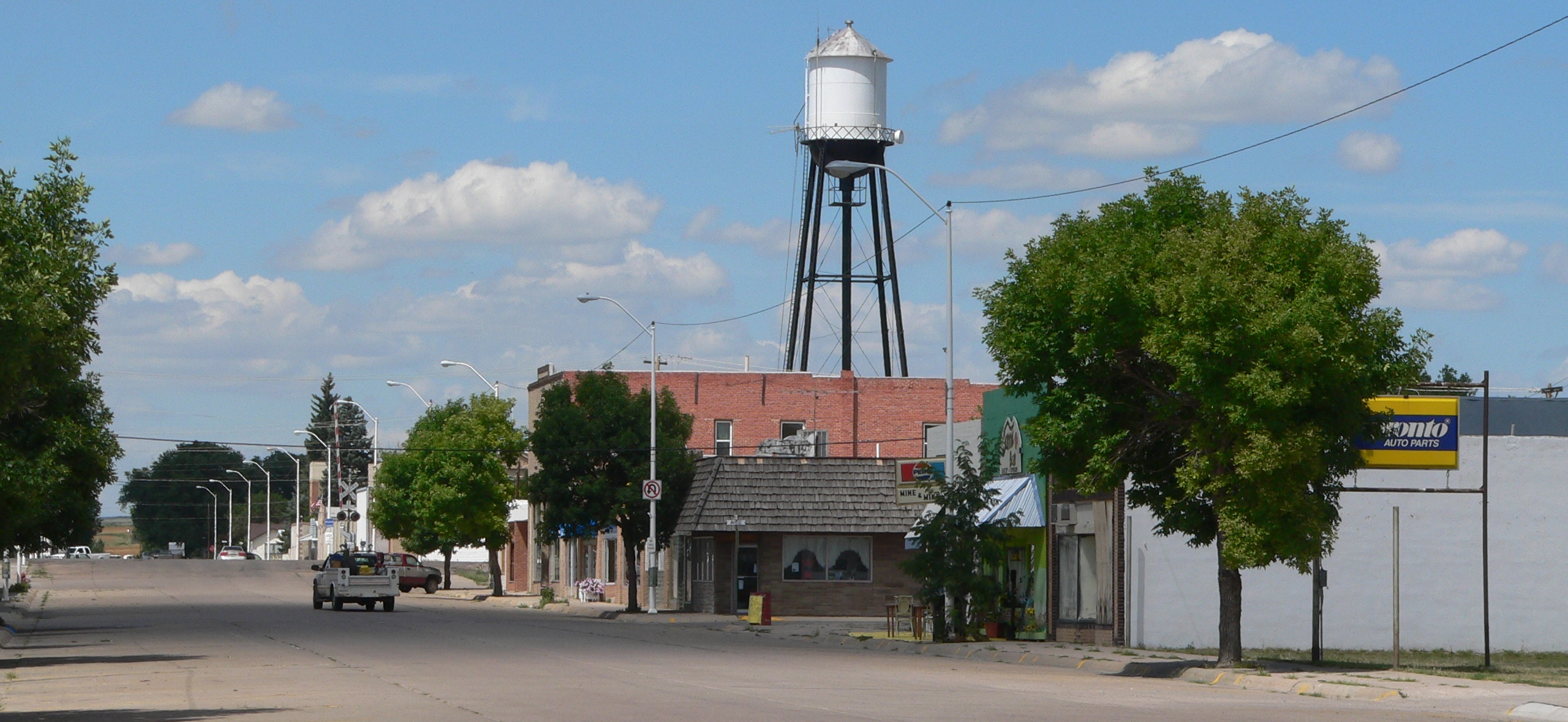
- Downtown Oshkosh: Main Street, looking north

- Location of Oshkosh, Nebraska
- Coordinates: 41°24′29″N 102°20′43″W
- Country: United States
- State: Nebraska
- County: Garden
- Incorporated: 1910

Area
  - Total: 0.67 sq mi (1.74 km^{2})
  - Land: 0.67 sq mi (1.74 km^{2})
  - Water: 0 sq mi (0.00 km^{2})
- Elevation: 3,396 ft (1,035 m)

Population (2020)
  - Total: 809
  - Density: 1,204.0/sq mi (464.87/km^{2})
- Time zone: UTC−7 (Mountain (MST))
  - Summer (DST): UTC−6 (MDT)
- ZIP codes: 69154, 69190
- Area code: 308
- FIPS code: 31-37560
- GNIS feature ID: 2396094
- Website: oshkoshnebraska.com

Oshkosh is a city in Garden County, Nebraska, United States. The population was 809 at the 2020 census. It is the county seat of Garden County.

== History ==
Oshkosh was founded in the 1880s by cattlemen who found the surrounding area ideal for livestock grazing. It was named after the city of Oshkosh, Wisconsin. The first post office in Oshkosh was established in 1889.

The railroad was extended to Oshkosh in 1908, and Oshkosh was designated county seat in 1909 of the new Garden County.

Oshkosh was incorporated in 1910.

On April 26, 1938, an estimated F5 tornado struck near the city, disintegrating a school and killing 3 children; the tornado also destroyed two farms.

== Geography ==
Oshkosh is located just north of the North Platte River.

According to the United States Census Bureau, the city has a total area of 0.67 square miles (1.74 km^{2}), all land.

== Demographics ==
Historical population
Census	Pop.	Note	%±
1920	707		—
1930	843		19.2%
1940	910		7.9%
1950	1,124		23.5%
1960	1,025		−8.8%
1970	1,067		4.1%
1980	1,057		−0.9%
1990	986		−6.7%
2000	887		−10.0%
2010	884		−0.3%
2020	809		−8.5%
U.S. Decennial Census

=== 2010 census ===
As of the census of 2010, there were 884 people, 400 households, and 229 families residing in the city. The population density was 1,319.4 inhabitants per square mile (509.4/km^{2}). There were 490 housing units at an average density of 731.3 per square mile (282.4/km^{2}). The racial makeup of the city was 97.1% White, 0.1% African American, 0.3% Native American, 0.7% from other races, and 1.8% from two or more races. Hispanic or Latino of any race were 4.2% of the population.

There were 400 households, of which 25.0% had children under the age of 18 living with them, 45.0% were married couples living together, 8.3% had a female householder with no husband present, 4.0% had a male householder with no wife present, and 42.8% were non-families. 39.0% of all households were made up of individuals, and 22% had someone living alone who was 65 years of age or older. The average household size was 2.13 and the average family size was 2.82.

The median age in the city was 47.5 years. 21.9% of residents were under the age of 18; 5.8% were between the ages of 18 and 24; 19.7% were from 25 to 44; 25.4% were from 45 to 64; and 27.4% were 65 years of age or older. The gender makeup of the city was 48.4% male and 51.6% female.

=== 2000 census ===
As of the census of 2000, there were 887 people, 413 households, and 249 families residing in the city. The population density was 1,316.8 inhabitants per square mile (508.4/km^{2}). There were 489 housing units at an average density of 726.0 per square mile (280.3/km^{2}). The racial makeup of the city was 99.44% White, 0.11% Native American, 0.11% Asian, and 0.34% from two or more races. Hispanic or Latino of any race were 1.92% of the population.

There were 413 households, out of which 23.2% had children under the age of 18 living with them, 49.2% were married couples living together, 7.5% had a female householder with no husband present, and 39.7% were non-families. 37.3% of all households were made up of individuals, and 19.6% had someone living alone who was 65 years of age or older. The average household size was 2.07 and the average family size was 2.72.

In the city, the population was spread out, with 20.6% under the age of 18, 4.5% from 18 to 24, 21.8% from 25 to 44, 23.6% from 45 to 64, and 29.5% who were 65 years of age or older. The median age was 47 years. For every 100 females, there were 84.8 males. For every 100 females age 18 and over, there were 81.0 males.

As of 2000, the median income for a household in the city was $27,135, and the median income for a family was $33,750. Males had a median income of $22,303 versus $18,000 for females. The per capita income for the city was $16,292. About 9.5% of families and 11.7% of the population were below the poverty line, including 17.9% of those under age 18 and 5.3% of those age 65 or over.

== Climate ==
Oshkosh is the site of the coldest temperature ever recorded in Nebraska: on December 22, 1989, the temperature fell to −47 °F or −43.9 °C, tying a state record set by Bridgeport in 1899.

Climate data for Oshkosh, Nebraska (1991–2020 normals, extremes 1913–present)
Month	Jan	Feb	Mar	Apr	May	Jun	Jul	Aug	Sep	Oct	Nov	Dec	Year
Record high °F (°C)	75 (24)	81 (27)	97 (36)	95 (35)	100 (38)	109 (43)	111 (44)	108 (42)	103 (39)	94 (34)	83 (28)	81 (27)	111 (44)
Mean maximum °F (°C)	61.0 (16.1)	67.3 (19.6)	78.0 (25.6)	84.1 (28.9)	90.8 (32.7)	97.2 (36.2)	101.0 (38.3)	98.6 (37.0)	95.6 (35.3)	86.2 (30.1)	74.3 (23.5)	64.3 (17.9)	101.8 (38.8)
Mean daily maximum °F (°C)	39.7 (4.3)	43.2 (6.2)	53.4 (11.9)	61.1 (16.2)	70.3 (21.3)	82.1 (27.8)	88.3 (31.3)	86.4 (30.2)	78.7 (25.9)	64.4 (18.0)	51.4 (10.8)	40.6 (4.8)	63.3 (17.4)
Daily mean °F (°C)	26.1 (−3.3)	29.3 (−1.5)	38.7 (3.7)	46.7 (8.2)	56.9 (13.8)	68.1 (20.1)	74.3 (23.5)	72.1 (22.3)	63.2 (17.3)	48.9 (9.4)	36.5 (2.5)	26.8 (−2.9)	49.0 (9.4)
Mean daily minimum °F (°C)	12.5 (−10.8)	15.4 (−9.2)	23.9 (−4.5)	32.4 (0.2)	43.6 (6.4)	54.1 (12.3)	60.4 (15.8)	57.8 (14.3)	47.7 (8.7)	33.5 (0.8)	21.6 (−5.8)	13.0 (−10.6)	34.7 (1.5)
Mean minimum °F (°C)	−10.7 (−23.7)	−7.7 (−22.1)	4.8 (−15.1)	17.0 (−8.3)	27.0 (−2.8)	41.2 (5.1)	49.2 (9.6)	45.8 (7.7)	31.5 (−0.3)	14.9 (−9.5)	1.8 (−16.8)	−8.2 (−22.3)	−17.9 (−27.7)
Record low °F (°C)	−34 (−37)	−34 (−37)	−29 (−34)	−10 (−23)	14 (−10)	29 (−2)	34 (1)	35 (2)	14 (−10)	−5 (−21)	−21 (−29)	−47 (−44)	−47 (−44)
Average precipitation inches (mm)	0.25 (6.4)	0.38 (9.7)	0.93 (24)	2.00 (51)	3.02 (77)	2.98 (76)	2.75 (70)	1.93 (49)	1.52 (39)	1.33 (34)	0.46 (12)	0.36 (9.1)	17.91 (455)
Average snowfall inches (cm)	3.8 (9.7)	5.3 (13)	4.1 (10)	3.8 (9.7)	0.4 (1.0)	0.0 (0.0)	0.0 (0.0)	0.0 (0.0)	0.0 (0.0)	1.6 (4.1)	3.6 (9.1)	5.1 (13)	27.7 (70)
Average precipitation days (≥ 0.01 in)	2.3	3.1	4.0	7.0	9.6	9.6	8.1	6.9	5.1	5.4	2.6	2.3	66.0
Average snowy days (≥ 0.1 in)	2.0	2.7	1.6	1.0	0.2	0.0	0.0	0.0	0.0	0.6	1.4	2.2	11.7
Source: NOAA

== Notable people ==
- Josh Rouse - folk musician, born in Oshkosh in 1972
- Irving W. Twiford (1898-1988) - politician

== See also ==
- Garden County Junior-Senior High School
