= 1922 Nebraska gubernatorial election =

- November 7, 1922
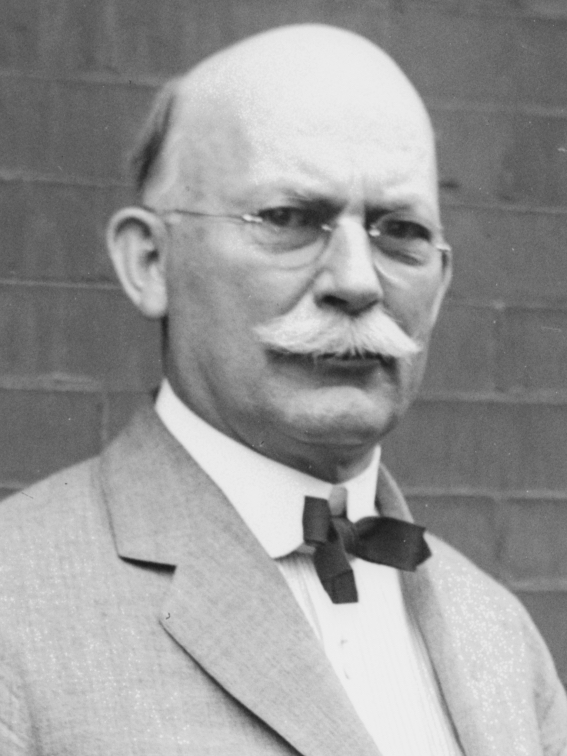

Nominee	Charles W. Bryan	Charles H. Randall
Party	Democratic	Republican
Popular vote	214,070	163,735
Percentage	54.62%	41.95%
- County results Bryan: 40–50% 50–60% 60–70% 70–80% Randall: 40–50% 50–60%
Governor before election
Samuel R. McKelvie
Republican
Elected Governor
Charles W. Bryan
Democratic

The 1922 Nebraska gubernatorial election was held on November 7, 1922, and featured former Mayor of Lincoln Charles W. Bryan, a Democrat and brother of William Jennings Bryan, defeating Republican nominee, state Senator Charles H. Randall.

== Democratic primary ==
=== Candidates ===
- Charles W. Bryan, former Mayor of Lincoln and newspaper publisher
- Dan B. Butler, Omaha City Commissioner
- Will M. Maupin, newspaper publisher and journalist
- John N. Norton, former state Representative and Mayor of Osceola

=== Results ===
Democratic primary results
Party	Candidate	Votes	%
Democratic	Charles W. Bryan	28,244	35.80
Democratic	Dan B. Butler	24,555	31.12
Democratic	John N. Norton	19,615	24.86
Democratic	Will M. Maupin	6,414	8.13
Democratic	Write-in	66	0.08

== Progressive primary ==
=== Candidates ===
- John N. Norton, former state Representative and Mayor of Osceola
- W. J. Taylor, state Senator

=== Results ===
Progressive primary results
Party	Candidate	Votes	%
Progressive Party (United States, 1924)	John N. Norton	4,048	52.67
Progressive Party (United States, 1924)	W. J. Taylor	3,624	47.15
Progressive Party (United States, 1924)	Write-in	14	0.18

=== Nomination ===
In spite of the primary results, the Nebraska Progressive Party nominated farmer and stockman Harry C. Parmenter on its ticket for Governor.

== Republican primary ==
=== Candidates ===
- Albert H. Byrum, state Representative
- Adam McMullen, former state Senator and Mayor of Wymore
- Charles H. Randall, state Senator
- George W. Sterling

=== Results ===
Republican primary results
Party	Candidate	Votes	%
Republican	Charles H. Randall	49,561	41.65
Republican	Adam McMullen	48,734	40.95
Republican	Albert H. Byrum	12,106	10.17
Republican	George W. Sterling	8,551	7.19
Republican	Write-in	51	0.04

== General election ==
=== Results ===
Nebraska gubernatorial election, 1922
Party	Candidate	Votes	%
Democratic	Charles W. Bryan	214,070	54.62%
Republican	Charles H. Randall	163,735	41.95%
Progressive Party (United States, 1924)	Harry C. Parmenter	13,435	3.43%
Write-in	Others	3	>0.01%
Total votes		391,243	100.0%
Democratic gain from Republican			

==== By County ====
By county

County	Person Democratic		Person Republican		Various candidates Other parties		Margin		Total votes
County	#	%	#	%	#	%	#	%	Total votes
Adams County									
Antelope County									
Arthur County									
Banner County									
Blaine County									
Boone County									
Box Butte County									
Boyd County									
Brown County									
Buffalo County									
Burt County									
Butler County									
Cass County									
Cedar County									
Chase County									
Cherry County									
Cheyenne County									
Clay County									
Colfax County									
Cuming County									
Custer County									
Dakota County									
Dawes County									
Dawson County									
Deuel County									
Dixon County									
Dodge County									
Douglas County									
Dundy County									
Fillmore County									
Franklin County									
Frontier County									
Furnas County									
Gage County									
Garden County									
Garfield County									
Gosper County									
Grant County									
Greeley County									
Hall County									
Hamilton County									
Hayes County									
Hitchcock County									
Holt County									
Hooker County									
Howard County									
Jefferson County									
Johnson County									
Kearney County									
Keith County									
Keya Paha County									
Kimball County									
Knox County									
Lancaster County									
Lincoln County									
Logan County									
Loup County									
Madison County									
McPherson County									
Merrick County									
Morrill County									
Nance County									
Nance County									
Nemaha County									
Nuckolls County									
Otoe County									
Pawnee County									
Perkins County									
Phelps County									
Pierce County									
Platte County									
Polk County									
Red Willow County									
Richardson County									
Rock County									
Saline County									
Sarpy County									
Saunders County									
Scotts Bluff County									
Seward County									
Sheridan County									
Sioux County									
Stanton County									
Thayer County									
Stanton County									
Thurston County									
Valley County									
Washington County									
Wayne County									
Webster County									
Wheeler County									
York County									
Totals									

== See also ==
- 1922 Nebraska lieutenant gubernatorial election
