= 1946 Nebraska lieutenant gubernatorial election =

- November 5, 1946
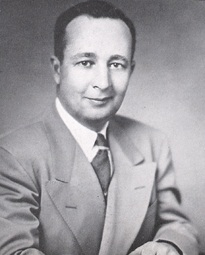

Nominee	Robert B. Crosby	Robert J. Swanson
Party	Republican	Democratic
Popular vote	229,673	134,443
Percentage	63.1%	36.9%
Lieutenant Governor before election
Roy W. Johnson
Republican
Elected Lieutenant Governor
Robert B. Crosby
Republican

The 1946 Nebraska lieutenant gubernatorial election was held on November 5, 1946. Incumbent Nebraska Lieutenant Governor Roy W. Johnson lost to Robert B. Crosby in the Republican primaries after the Nebraska Republican Pre-Primary Convention refused to endorse him for reelection. Thus, the general election featured Robert B. Crosby as the Republican nominee who defeated Democratic nominee Robert J. Swanson.

== Democratic primary ==
=== Candidates ===
- Roy M. Harrop, lawyer and oil operator from Omaha, Nebraska, who ran on the Progressive Party ticket for the US House of Representatives in 1922, received the Progressive Party nomination for Governor of Nebraska in 1926, ran in the Republican primaries for governor in 1928, and ran in the Democratic primaries for governor in 1942
- Robert J. Swanson, attorney from Omaha, Nebraska

=== Results ===
Democratic primary results
Party	Candidate	Votes	%
Democratic	Robert J. Swanson	38,522	78.37
Democratic	Roy M. Harrop	10,631	21.63

== Republican primary ==
Prior to the Republican primaries, the Nebraska Republican Party met in a pre-primary convention to endorse particular candidates. The convention endorsed recent Speaker of the Nebraska Legislature Robert B. Crosby instead of incumbent Nebraska Lieutenant Governor Roy W. Johnson. Some alleged that the reason Johnson was not endorsed was a perception among state legislators that he was not adept at presiding over the Nebraska Legislature or knowing the rules of procedure. Johnson's lack of endorsement by the pre-primary convention was credited with his subsequent loss in the Republican primaries.

=== Candidates ===
- Robert B. Crosby, fourth Speaker of the Nebraska Unicameral Legislature and former member of the Nebraska Legislature from what was then District 38
- Roy W. Johnson, incumbent Nebraska Lieutenant Governor
- Mary E. Kenny, former teacher from Lincoln, Nebraska
- Charles J. Warner, first Speaker of the Nebraska Unicameral Legislature and former member of the Nebraska Legislature from what was then District 18 for over 20 years

=== Results ===
Republican primary results
Party	Candidate	Votes	%
Republican	Robert B. Crosby	56,376	46.34
Republican	Charles J. Warner	31,139	25.59
Republican	Roy W. Johnson (incumbent)	28,601	23.51
Republican	Mary E. Kenny	5,548	4.56

== General election ==
=== Results ===
Nebraska lieutenant gubernatorial election, 1946
Party	Candidate	Votes	%
Republican	Robert B. Crosby	229,673	63.08
Democratic	Robert J. Swanson	134,443	36.92
Total votes		364,116	100.00
Republican hold			

== See also ==
- 1946 Nebraska gubernatorial election
