= Ray Thomas (Nebraska politician) =

American politician (1883–1945)

Member of the Nebraska Legislature from the 25th district
- In office January 2, 1940 – January 2, 1945
- Preceded by: Jay Hastings
- Succeeded by: Lester Anderson

Member of the Nebraska House of Representatives from the 57th district
- In office January 1, 1935 – January 5, 1937
- Preceded by: George England
- Succeeded by: Position abolished

Personal details
- Born: April 1, 1883 Nelson, Nebraska
- Died: December 31, 1945 (aged 62) Clay Center, Nebraska
- Party: Democratic
- Spouse: Verna L. Northrup (m. 1909)
- Children: 3
- Occupation: Farmer

Ray Thomas (April 1, 1883 – December 31, 1945) was a Democratic politician from Nebraska who served as a member of the Nebraska House of Representatives from the 57th district from 1935 to 1937 and as a member of the Nebraska Legislature from the 25th district from 1940 to 1945.

== Early life ==
Thomas was born in Nelson, Nebraska, in 1883, and attended grade school in Nuckolls County. He settled in Clay Center, where he was a farmer and operated a hatchery. Thomas served on the local school board and was the president of the Clay County Farmers Union.

== Nebraska House of Representatives ==
In 1934, Thomas ran for the Nebraska House of Representatives from the 57th district, challenging incumbent State Representative George England in the Democratic primary. Thomas won the nomination, receiving 40 percent of the vote to England's 25 percent. In the general election, Thomas defeated Republican H. M. Hanson with 55 percent of the vote.

== Nebraska Legislature ==
When the State House and the State Senate were consolidated and replaced with the unicameral legislature, Thomas ran for the newly created 25th district in the state legislature. He faced former Congressman John N. Norton, former State Representative Joe Gunnerson, John Henthorn, and L. T. Johnson, in the nonpartisan primary. Norton and Thomas placed first and second and advanced to the general election, which Norton won, defeating Thomas with 53 percent of the vote.

Norton declined to seek a second term in 1938, and Thomas ran to succeed him. In the nonpartisan primary, he ran against Vern Hagarity, Homer McKelvie, and Nels Torstenson, as well as former State Representatives Carl Bremer and Jay Hastings. Thomas narrowly placed first in the primary, receiving 24 percent of the vote, and advanced to the general election with Hastings, who placed second with 22 percent. Hastings defeated Thomas with 52 percent of the vote.

On November 14, 1939, Hastings died, and Governor Robert Leroy Cochran appointed Thomas to serve out the remaining year of Hastings's term, the first gubernatorial appointment to the legislature following the creation of the unicameral legislature. He was sworn in on January 2, 1940.

Thomas ran for a full term in 1940, and was challenged by Joe Gunnerson, George Miller, and Nels Torstenson. Thomas placed first in the primary, receiving 40 percent of the vote, and faced Gunnerson, who received 27 percent of the vote, in the general election. Thomas defeated Gunnerson with 55 percent of the vote.

In 1942, Thomas ran for re-election, and was challenged by N. P. Peterson and Lester Anderson. Thomas won the primary by a wide margin, receiving 53 percent of the vote to Peterson's 26 percent and Anderson's 21 percent. In the general election, Thomas defeated Peterson with 57 percent of the vote. He did not seek re-election in 1944.

== Death ==
Thomas died on December 31, 1945.
