= The Commoner =

Newspaper from 1901-1923

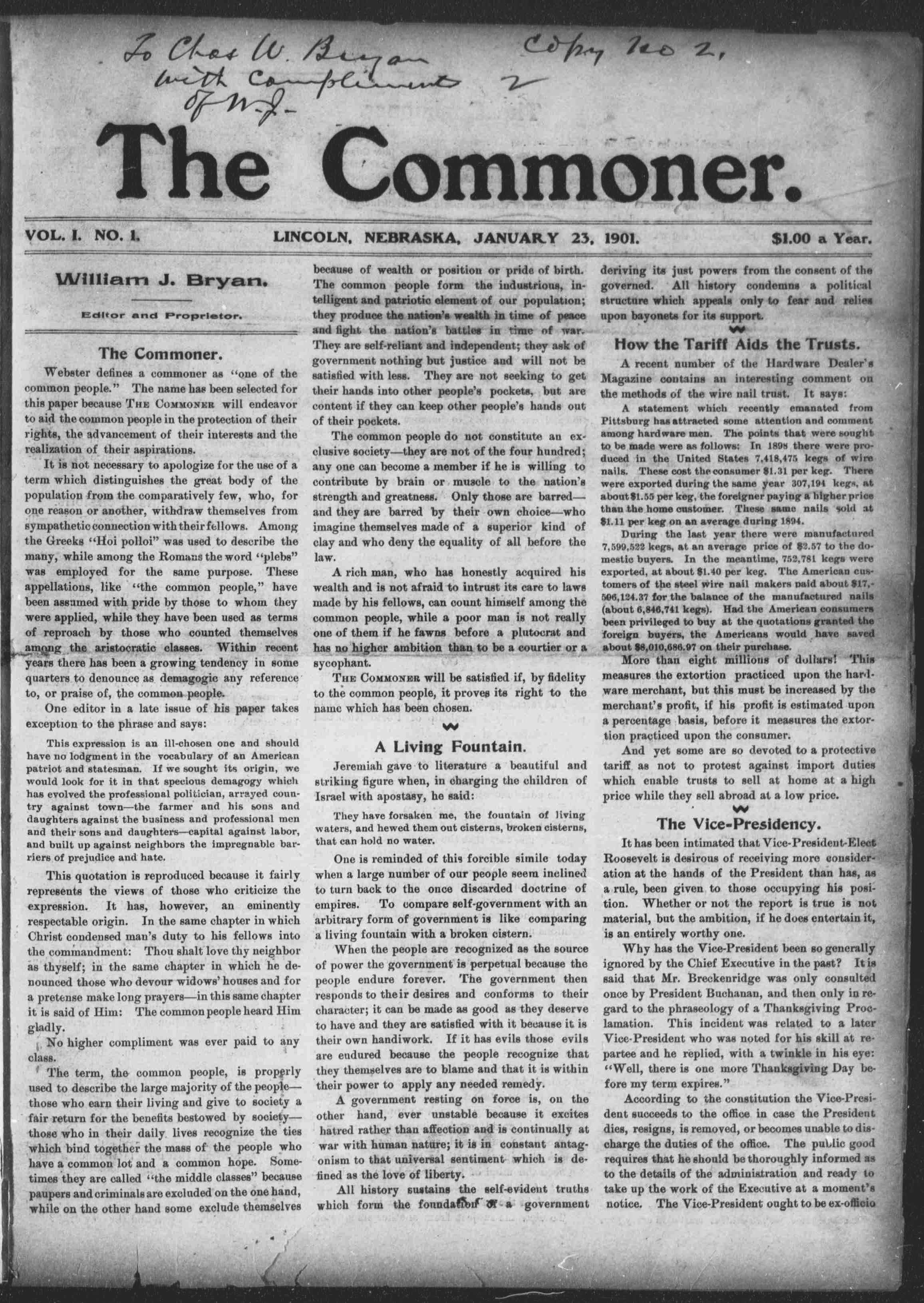
Title page of the first issue of The Commoner, January 23, 1901

The Commoner was a weekly newspaper published in Lincoln, Nebraska, from 1901 to 1923 that was owned, edited, and published by William Jennings Bryan. The Commoner was a political paper of the early twentieth century that impacted a great deal of public opinion on critical matters.

== History ==
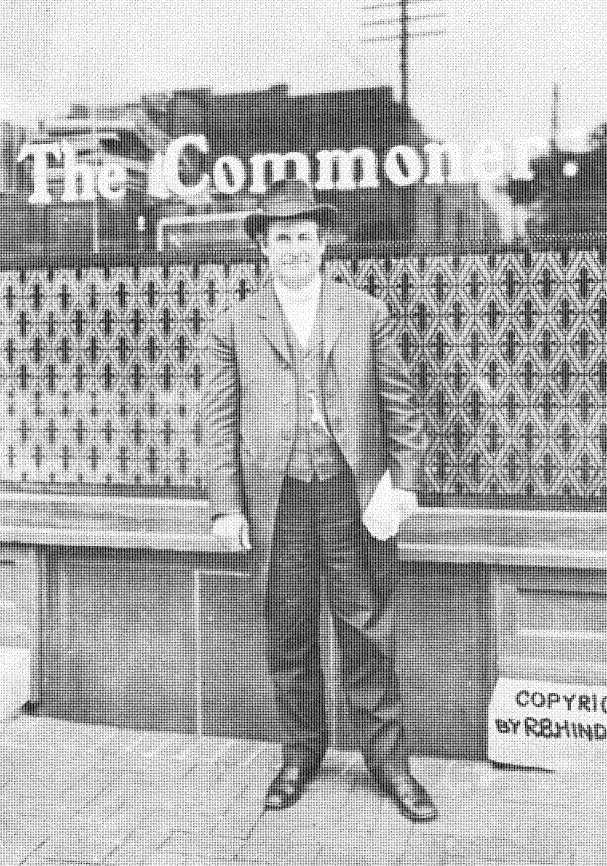
William Jennings Bryan in front of The Commoner office

Following two unsuccessful runs for the presidency Bryan returned to his roots in publishing and founded the paper in order to support the rights and liberties of American citizens. The first issue stated its goal as providing "aid to common people in the protection of their rights, the advancement of their interests and the realizations of their aspirations".

The Commoner had a wide reach and subscriptions to the paper were delivered to every state. Before the first issue went to press on January 23, 1901, more than seventeen thousand advanced subscriptions had been placed. Within five years of publishing The Commoner had a paid subscription reach well above 100,000 readers.

The publication practices followed by The Commoner were consistent with the more simplistic newspaper layouts. With an easy to digest three column design the paper was highly pleasing to the eye and could be sold at a very low price. Subscribers could purchase a years subscription for one dollar or purchase an individual issue for only a nickel a piece. In addition to its simple design, the narrative and rhetoric of the newspaper was engaging and understandable to the average man. By writing in a relatable manner The Commoner was able to introduce political discourse to daily life and discussions. From covering the election of Woodrow Wilson, outing government corruption, and fighting against imperialism the newspaper was always concerned with being a publication of patriotism.

Although William Jennings Bryan enjoyed proclaiming himself sole editor-publisher, much of the work was also completed by his brother, Charlie W. Bryan. Charlie worked as both the managing and general editor of the newspaper and oversaw most of the content creation and production while Jennings Bryan toured and spoke across the country. While The Commoner would continue to gain substantial subscriptions the work of running a newspaper became too much for William Jennings Bryan and, when Woodrow Wilson appointed him his years as Secretary of State in 1913, the paper moved from being a weekly publication to a monthly.

As owner of the newspaper Bryan published articles that followed his moral ideals which did not always align with the Democratic parties platform of the era. The Commoner always placed religious righteousness before bending to party doctrine. In all of its political coverage The Commoner never strayed from its belief in the teachings of the Bible and included sections of the paper such as "Mr. Bryan's Bible Talks". Within the articles published by Bryan the principles of Christianity are applied to political issues. Many of the editorials were written to support religiously influenced political reforms such as the prohibition movement or the denunciation of the evolutionary theory phenomenon. Due to his beliefs Bryan was politically ostracized by other Democrats and retreated to The Commoner where he promoted policies like the Nebraska statewide referendum on woman suffrage. The different party attitudes weighed heavily on Bryan and this political digression is evident within the articles published by The Commoner.

In addition to the political correspondences, Will M. Maupin wrote the column "Whether Common Or Not" for The Commoner. The column included poems, comic stories, anecdotes, and only contained a bit of political discourse. Bryan wrote the foreword for a 1903 republication of Maupin's columns from paper and stated the column to be for people who enjoyed "innocent fun, delicate humor, and philosophy seasoned with sentiment".

William Jennings Bryan was the Commoner and the opinions and discourse of his paper mattered to many citizens and informed voters on policies for over two decades. However, due to the failing health of Bryan and the appointment of Charles Bryan as Nebraska governor, the paper could not be sustained and in April 1923, after 768 publications, the last issue of The Commoner was produced.
