= 1944 Nebraska lieutenant gubernatorial election =

- November 7, 1944

| Nominee | Roy W. Johnson | Edward A. Dosek |
| Party | Republican | Democratic |
| Popular vote | 351,174 | 152,724 |
| Percentage | 69.7% | 30.3% |
Lieutenant Governor before election
Roy W. Johnson
Republican
Elected Lieutenant Governor
Roy W. Johnson
Republican

The 1944 Nebraska lieutenant gubernatorial election was held on November 7, 1944, and featured incumbent Nebraska Lieutenant Governor Roy W. Johnson, a Republican, defeating Democratic nominee Edward A. Dosek.

== Democratic primary ==
=== Candidates ===
- Edward A. Dosek, businessman, banker, and insurance agent from Lincoln, Nebraska, and former head accountant for the Nebraska State Treasurer from 1933 to 1937
- Bessie R. Saxton, former member of the Omaha, Nebraska, school board

=== Results ===
Democratic primary results
| Party | Candidate | Votes | % |
|---|---|---|---|
| Democratic | Edward A. Dosek | 24,596 | 65.44 |
| Democratic | Bessie R. Saxton | 12,982 | 34.54 |
| Scattering | | 6 | |

== Republican primary ==
=== Candidates ===
- Roy W. Johnson, incumbent Nebraska Lieutenant Governor
- Fred A. Marsh, former superintendent of schools in Merrick County, Nebraska, and former member of the University of Nebraska Board of Regents
- Harry L. Reed, insurance agent and property manager in Lincoln, Nebraska
- Andrew E. Swanson, farmer from near Polk, Nebraska
- Leo N. Swanson, businessman in the plumbing and heating industry from Omaha, Nebraska, commissioner of public lands and buildings from 1935 to 1939, past candidate for Nebraska Secretary of State in 1942

=== Results ===
Republican primary results
| Party | Candidate | Votes | % |
|---|---|---|---|
| Republican | Roy W. Johnson (incumbent) | 25,197 | 32.15 |
| Republican | Fred A. Marsh | 19,643 | 25.07 |
| Republican | Harry L. Reed | 14,236 | 18.17 |
| Republican | Andrew E. Swanson | 10,384 | 13.25 |
| Republican | Leo N. Swanson | 8,907 | 11.37 |
| Scattering | | 1 | |

== General election ==
=== Results ===
Nebraska lieutenant gubernatorial election, 1944
| Party | Candidate | Votes | % |
|---|---|---|---|
| Republican | Roy W. Johnson (incumbent) | 351,174 | 69.69 |
| Democratic | Robert J. Swanson | 152,724 | 30.31 |
| Total votes | | 503,898 | 100.00 |
| Republican hold | | | |

== See also ==
- 1944 Nebraska gubernatorial election
