= 1924 Nebraska gubernatorial election =

- November 4, 1924
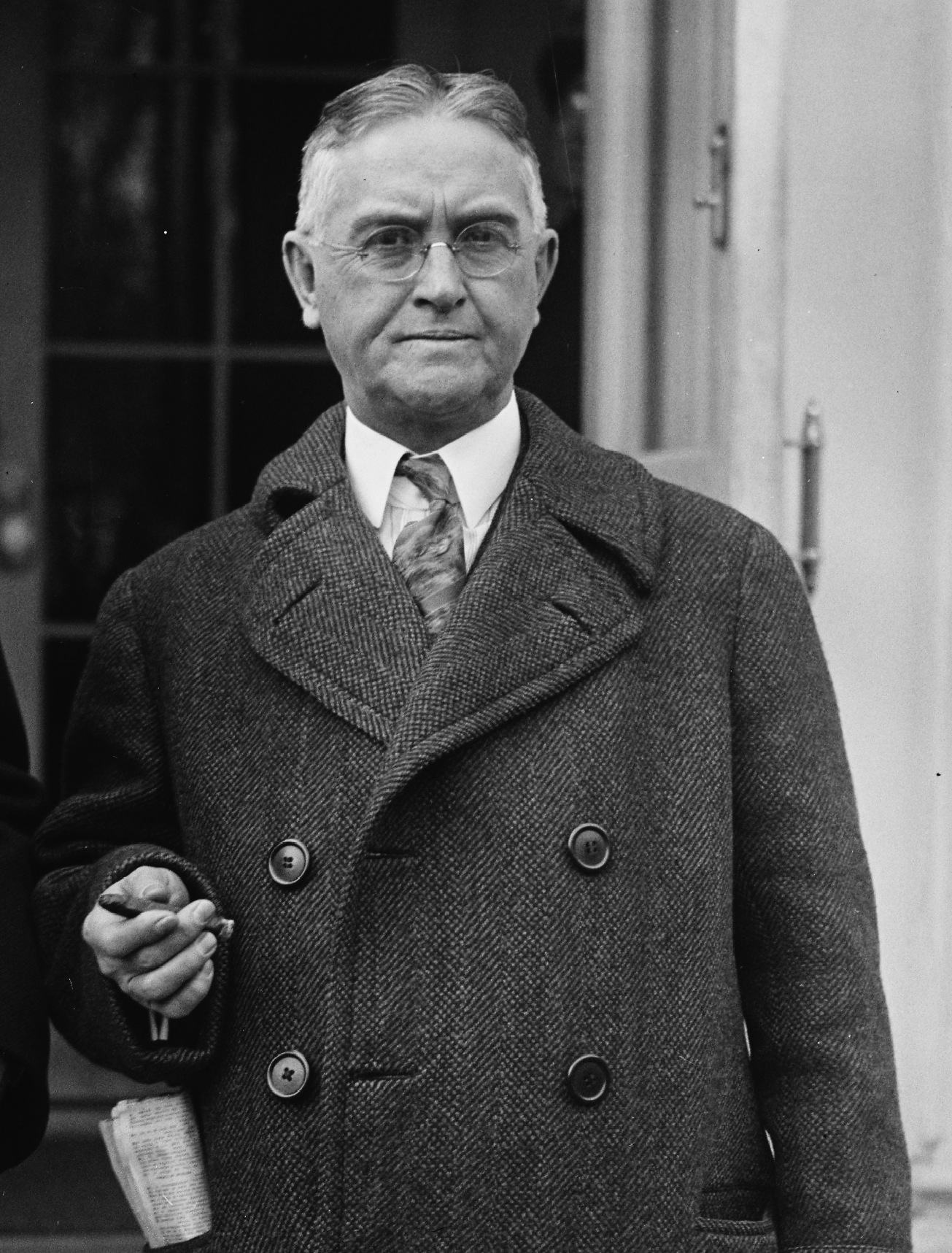

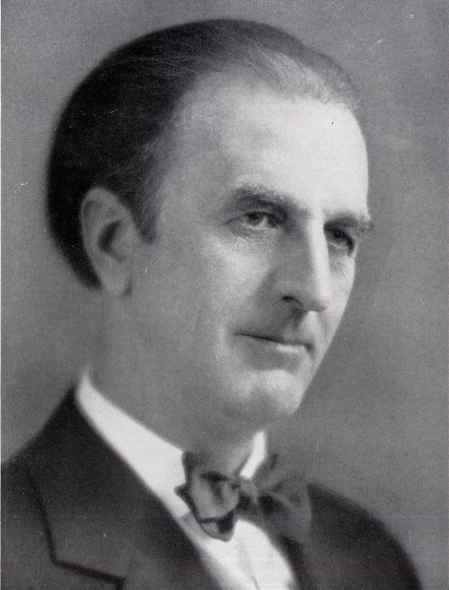

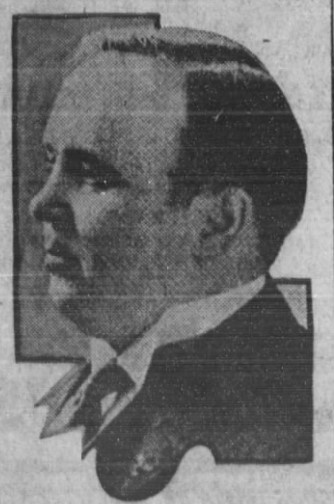
Nominee	Adam McMullen	John N. Norton	Dan B. Butler
Party	Republican	Democratic	Progressive Party (United States, 1924)
Popular vote	229,067	183,709	35,594
Percentage	51.09%	40.97%	7.94%
- County results McMullen: 40–50% 50–60% 60–70% Norton: 40–50% 50–60% 60–70%
Governor before election
Charles W. Bryan
Democratic
Elected Governor
Adam McMullen
Republican

The 1924 Nebraska gubernatorial election was held on November 4, 1924, and featured former state Senator Adam McMullen, a Republican, defeating Democratic nominee, former state Representative John N. Norton, and Progressive nominee, Omaha City Commissioner Dan B. Butler.

Incumbent Governor Charles W. Bryan, initially the nominee of both the Democratic and Progressive parties, withdrew from the race after being nominated for Vice President of the United States at the 1924 Democratic National Convention on July 9.

== Democratic primary ==
=== Candidates ===
- Charles W. Bryan, incumbent Governor
- Charles Graff, former member of the Nebraska Legislature and president of the state Board of Agriculture

=== Results ===
Democratic primary results
Party	Candidate	Votes	%
Democratic	Charles W. Bryan (incumbent)	58,854	81.32
Democratic	Charles Graff	13,482	18.63
Democratic	Write-in	36	0.05

=== Replacement nominee ===
Following Bryan's withdrawal from the race, the Democratic State Central Committee met in Lincoln to choose a replacement on July 24. Among others, candidates considered for the nomination included Omaha City Commissioner John H. Hopkins, former state Representative John N. Norton of Polk, Morrill County Attorney Kenneth M. McDonald of Bridgeport, and former U.S. Representative Dan V. Stephens of Fremont. Norton was chosen on the seventeenth ballot after Hopkins and Stephens each withdrew their names, and besting McDonald with the necessary two-thirds of the vote.

== Progressive primary ==
=== Candidates ===
- Charles W. Bryan, incumbent Governor
- Edward Sughroue

=== Results ===
Progressive primary results
Party	Candidate	Votes	%
Progressive Party (United States, 1924)	Charles W. Bryan (incumbent)	1,329	77.86
Progressive Party (United States, 1924)	Edward Sughroue	365	21.38
Progressive Party (United States, 1924)	Write-in	13	0.76

=== Replacement nominee ===
Omaha City Commissioner Dan B. Butler, a Democrat and supporter of Senator Robert M. La Follette in the 1924 presidential election, was chosen by the three member Progressive Party State Executive Committee.

== Prohibition primary ==
=== Candidates ===
- Charles W. Bryan, incumbent Governor

=== Results ===
Prohibition primary results
Party	Candidate	Votes	%
Prohibition	Charles W. Bryan (incumbent)	24	63.16
Prohibition	Write-in	14	36.84

== Republican primary ==
=== Candidates ===
- C. H. Gustafson, former president of the United States Grain Growers Association
- Albert N. Mathers, state Representative and former Mayor of Gering
- Adam McMullen, former state Senator and Mayor of Wymore
- George W. Sterling
- W. F. Stoecker

=== Results ===
Republican primary results
Party	Candidate	Votes	%
Republican	Adam McMullen	49,858	42.65
Republican	Albert N. Mathers	36,292	31.04
Republican	C. H. Gustafson	18,156	15.53
Republican	George W. Sterling	6,913	5.91
Republican	W. F. Stoecker	5,468	4.68
Republican	Write-in	224	0.19

== General election ==
=== Results ===
Nebraska gubernatorial election, 1924
Party	Candidate	Votes	%
Republican	Adam McMullen	229,067	51.09%
Democratic	John N. Norton	183,709	40.97%
Progressive Party (United States, 1924)	Dan B. Butler	35,594	7.94%
Write-in	Others	2	>0.01%
Total votes		448,372	100.0%
Republican gain from Democratic			

==== By County ====
By county

County	Person Democratic		Person Republican		Various candidates Other parties		Margin		Total votes
County	#	%	#	%	#	%	#	%	Total votes
Adams County									
Antelope County									
Arthur County									
Banner County									
Blaine County									
Boone County									
Box Butte County									
Boyd County									
Brown County									
Buffalo County									
Burt County									
Butler County									
Cass County									
Cedar County									
Chase County									
Cherry County									
Cheyenne County									
Clay County									
Colfax County									
Cuming County									
Custer County									
Dakota County									
Dawes County									
Dawson County									
Deuel County									
Dixon County									
Dodge County									
Douglas County									
Dundy County									
Fillmore County									
Franklin County									
Frontier County									
Furnas County									
Gage County									
Garden County									
Garfield County									
Gosper County									
Grant County									
Greeley County									
Hall County									
Hamilton County									
Hayes County									
Hitchcock County									
Holt County									
Hooker County									
Howard County									
Jefferson County									
Johnson County									
Kearney County									
Keith County									
Keya Paha County									
Kimball County									
Knox County									
Lancaster County									
Lincoln County									
Logan County									
Loup County									
Madison County									
McPherson County									
Merrick County									
Morrill County									
Nance County									
Nance County									
Nemaha County									
Nuckolls County									
Otoe County									
Pawnee County									
Perkins County									
Phelps County									
Pierce County									
Platte County									
Polk County									
Red Willow County									
Richardson County									
Rock County									
Saline County									
Sarpy County									
Saunders County									
Scotts Bluff County									
Seward County									
Sheridan County									
Sioux County									
Stanton County									
Thayer County									
Stanton County									
Thurston County									
Valley County									
Washington County									
Wayne County									
Webster County									
Wheeler County									
York County									
Totals									

== See also ==
- 1924 Nebraska lieutenant gubernatorial election
