= Nebraska's 4th congressional district =

Former U.S. House district from 1893 to 1963

- Obsolete district
- Created: 1890
- Eliminated: 1960
- Years active: 1893-1963

Nebraska's 4th congressional district is an obsolete district. It was created after the 1890 census and abolished after the 1960 census.

== List of members representing the district ==
| Member | Party | Years of service | Cong ress | Electoral history |
|---|---|---|---|---|
District established March 4, 1893
| Eugene J. Hainer (Aurora) | Republican | March 4, 1893 – March 3, 1897 | 53rd 54th | Elected in 1892. Re-elected in 1894. Lost re-election. |
| William L. Stark (Aurora) | Populist | March 4, 1897 – March 3, 1903 | 55th 56th 57th | Elected in 1896. Re-elected in 1898. Re-elected in 1900. Lost re-election. |
| Edmund H. Hinshaw (Fairbury) | Republican | March 4, 1903 – March 3, 1911 | 58th 59th 60th 61st | Elected in 1902. Re-elected in 1904. Re-elected in 1906. Re-elected in 1908. Retired. |
| Charles H. Sloan (Geneva) | Republican | March 4, 1911 – March 3, 1919 | 62nd 63rd 64th 65th | Elected in 1910. Re-elected in 1912. Re-elected in 1914. Re-elected in 1916. Retired. |
| Melvin O. McLaughlin (York) | Republican | March 4, 1919 – March 3, 1927 | 66th 67th 68th 69th | Elected in 1918. Re-elected in 1920. Re-elected in 1922. Re-elected in 1924. Lost re-election. |
| John N. Norton (Polk) | Democratic | March 4, 1927 – March 3, 1929 | 70th | Elected in 1926. Lost re-election. |
| Charles Henry Sloan (Geneva) | Republican | March 4, 1929 – March 3, 1931 | 71st | Elected in 1928. Lost re-election. |
| John N. Norton (Polk) | Democratic | March 4, 1931 – March 3, 1933 | 72nd | Elected in 1930. Lost renomination. |
| Ashton C. Shallenberger (Alma) | Democratic | March 4, 1933 – January 3, 1935 | 73rd | Redistricted from the 5th district and re-elected in 1932. Lost renomination. |
| Charles Binderup (Minden) | Democratic | January 3, 1935 – January 3, 1939 | 74th 75th | Elected in 1934. Re-elected in 1936. Lost re-election. |
| Carl Curtis (Minden) | Republican | January 3, 1939 – January 3, 1943 | 76th 77th | Elected in 1938. Re-elected in 1940. Redistricted to the 1st district. |
| Arthur L. Miller (Kimball) | Republican | January 3, 1943 – January 3, 1959 | 78th 79th 80th 81st 82nd 83rd 84th 85th | Elected in 1942. Re-elected in 1944. Re-elected in 1946. Re-elected in 1948. Re-elected in 1950. Re-elected in 1952. Re-elected in 1954. Re-elected in 1956. Lost re-election. |
| Donald McGinley (Ogallala) | Democratic | January 3, 1959 – January 3, 1961 | 86th | Elected in 1958. Lost re-election. |
| David Martin (Kearney) | Republican | January 3, 1961 – January 3, 1963 | 87th | Elected in 1960. Redistricted to the 3rd district. |
District eliminated January 3, 1963
