= 1930 Nebraska gubernatorial election =

- November 4, 1930
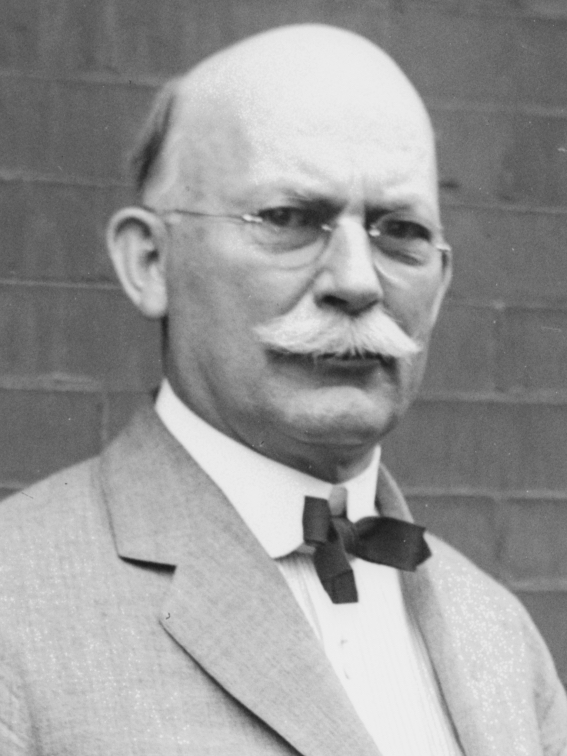

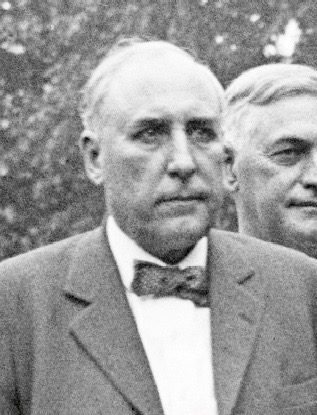
Nominee	Charles W. Bryan	Arthur J. Weaver
Party	Democratic	Republican
Popular vote	222,161	215,615
Percentage	50.75%	49.25%
- County results Bryan: 50–60% 60–70% Weaver: 50–60% 60–70%
Governor before election
Arthur J. Weaver
Republican
Elected Governor
Charles W. Bryan
Democratic

The 1930 Nebraska gubernatorial election was held on November 4, 1930, and featured former governor Charles W. Bryan, a Democrat, narrowly defeating incumbent Republican governor Arthur J. Weaver to win a second two-year, non-consecutive term in office.

== Democratic primary ==
=== Candidates ===
- Charles W. Bryan, former governor
- Anton H. Jensen

=== Results ===
Democratic primary results
Party	Candidate	Votes	%
Democratic	Charles W. Bryan	69,398	82.78
Democratic	Anton H. Jensen	14,428	17.21
Democratic	Write-in	5	0.01

== Republican primary ==
=== Candidates ===
- Harry O. Palmer, attorney
- Arthur J. Weaver, incumbent governor

=== Results ===
Republican primary results
Party	Candidate	Votes	%
Republican	Arthur J. Weaver (incumbent)	139,074	75.68
Republican	Harry O. Palmer	44,647	24.29
Republican	Write-in	55	0.03

== General election ==
=== Results ===
Nebraska gubernatorial election, 1930
Party	Candidate	Votes	%
Democratic	Charles W. Bryan	222,161	50.75%
Republican	Arthur J. Weaver (incumbent)	215,615	49.25%
Write-in	Others	3	>0.01%
Total votes		437,779	100.0%
Democratic gain from Republican			

==== By County ====
By county

County	Person Democratic		Person Republican		Various candidates Other parties		Margin		Total votes
County	#	%	#	%	#	%	#	%	Total votes
Adams County									
Antelope County									
Arthur County									
Banner County									
Blaine County									
Boone County									
Box Butte County									
Boyd County									
Brown County									
Buffalo County									
Burt County									
Butler County									
Cass County									
Cedar County									
Chase County									
Cherry County									
Cheyenne County									
Clay County									
Colfax County									
Cuming County									
Custer County									
Dakota County									
Dawes County									
Dawson County									
Deuel County									
Dixon County									
Dodge County									
Douglas County									
Dundy County									
Fillmore County									
Franklin County									
Frontier County									
Furnas County									
Gage County									
Garden County									
Garfield County									
Gosper County									
Grant County									
Greeley County									
Hall County									
Hamilton County									
Hayes County									
Hitchcock County									
Holt County									
Hooker County									
Howard County									
Jefferson County									
Johnson County									
Kearney County									
Keith County									
Keya Paha County									
Kimball County									
Knox County									
Lancaster County									
Lincoln County									
Logan County									
Loup County									
Madison County									
McPherson County									
Merrick County									
Morrill County									
Nance County									
Nance County									
Nemaha County									
Nuckolls County									
Otoe County									
Pawnee County									
Perkins County									
Phelps County									
Pierce County									
Platte County									
Polk County									
Red Willow County									
Richardson County									
Rock County									
Saline County									
Sarpy County									
Saunders County									
Scotts Bluff County									
Seward County									
Sheridan County									
Sioux County									
Stanton County									
Thayer County									
Stanton County									
Thurston County									
Valley County									
Washington County									
Wayne County									
Webster County									
Wheeler County									
York County									
Totals									

== See also ==
- 1930 Nebraska lieutenant gubernatorial election
