= Edmund H. Hinshaw =

American politician (1860–1932)

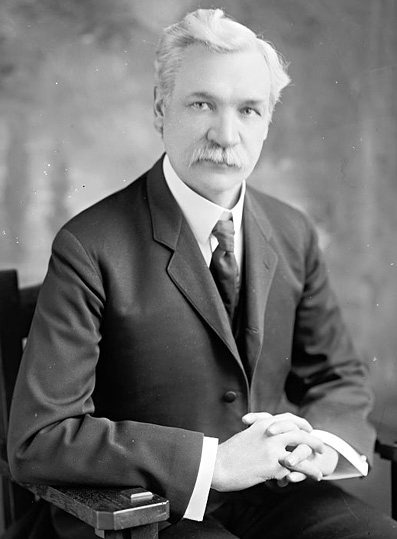

Member of the U.S. House of Representatives from Nebraska's 4th district
- In office March 4, 1903 – March 3, 1911
- Preceded by: William Ledyard Stark
- Succeeded by: Charles Henry Sloan

Personal details
- Born: December 8, 1860 Greensboro, Indiana
- Died: June 15, 1932 (aged 71) Los Angeles, California
- Party: Republican

Edmund Howard Hinshaw (December 8, 1860 – June 15, 1932) was an American Republican Party politician.

Born in Greensboro, Indiana on December 8, 1860, he graduated from Butler College in Indianapolis, Indiana in 1885. He moved to Fairbury, Nebraska in 1887 and was superintendent of the public schools until 1888 while he studied law. He passed the bar and started practicing in Fairbury.

He became a city clerk in 1889 and attorney for Fairbury in 1890. He was an attorney for Jefferson County from 1895 to 1899. He ran and lost for a house seat in the 56th congress in 1898 and ran and lost for the United States Senate in 1901. He ran and won a House seat as a Republican to the 58th and the three succeeding Congresses (March 4, 1903 – March 3, 1911).

He did not run for renomination in 1910, instead of resuming law practice in Fairbury. He moved to Los Angeles, California in 1912 continuing to practice law. He also ran a chain of movie theaters. He died there on June 15, 1932, and is buried in Forest Lawn Cemetery, Glendale, California. He was the cousin to Illinois representative Edwin B. Brooks.

U.S. House of Representatives
Preceded by William Ledyard Stark (P)	Member of the U.S. House of Representatives from Nebraska's 4th congressional district March 4, 1903 – March 3, 1911	Succeeded by Charles Henry Sloan (R)
