= William L. Stark =

American politician

William Ledyard Stark
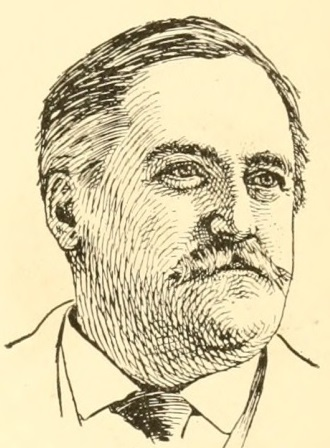
- From 1902's Around the Capital with Uncle Hank

Member of the U.S. House of Representatives from Nebraska's 4th district
- In office March 4, 1897 – March 3, 1903
- Preceded by: Eugene Jerome Hainer
- Succeeded by: Edmund H. Hinshaw

Personal details
- Born: July 29, 1853 Mystic, Connecticut
- Died: November 11, 1922 (aged 69) Tarpon Springs, Florida
- Party: Populist

William Ledyard Stark (July 29, 1853 – November 11, 1922) was an American Populist Party politician.

Born in Mystic, Connecticut on July 29, 1853, Stark moved to Wyoming, Illinois, in 1872. He taught school and worked as a clerk at a store. He attended Union College of Law in Chicago, Illinois. He was admitted to the bar by the Supreme Court of Illinois in January 1878.

Stark moved to Aurora, Nebraska, in February 1878, serving as superintendent of city schools in Aurora. He became deputy district attorney and then judge of the Hamilton County Court in Hamilton County, Nebraska. He served in the Nebraska National Guard as a major and Judge Advocate General. He ran for the United States House of Representatives in 1895 and 1897 as a Populist, losing the first time and before being elected to the 55th United States Congress on his second attempt . He was reelected to the 56th and 57th Congresses, serving from March 4, 1897 to March 3, 1903.

Stark ran for the United States Congress as a Fusionist in 1902, but lost. After leaving office in 1903, he retired to Aurora.

Stark died in Tarpon Springs, Florida on November 11, 1922. He is buried in the city cemetery in Aurora.

U.S. House of Representatives
| Preceded by Eugene Jerome Hainer (R) | Member of the U.S. House of Representatives from Nebraska's 4th congressional district March 4, 1897 – March 3, 1903 | Succeeded by Edmund H. Hinshaw (R) |
