= Silas Bryan =

American politician

Silas L. Bryan
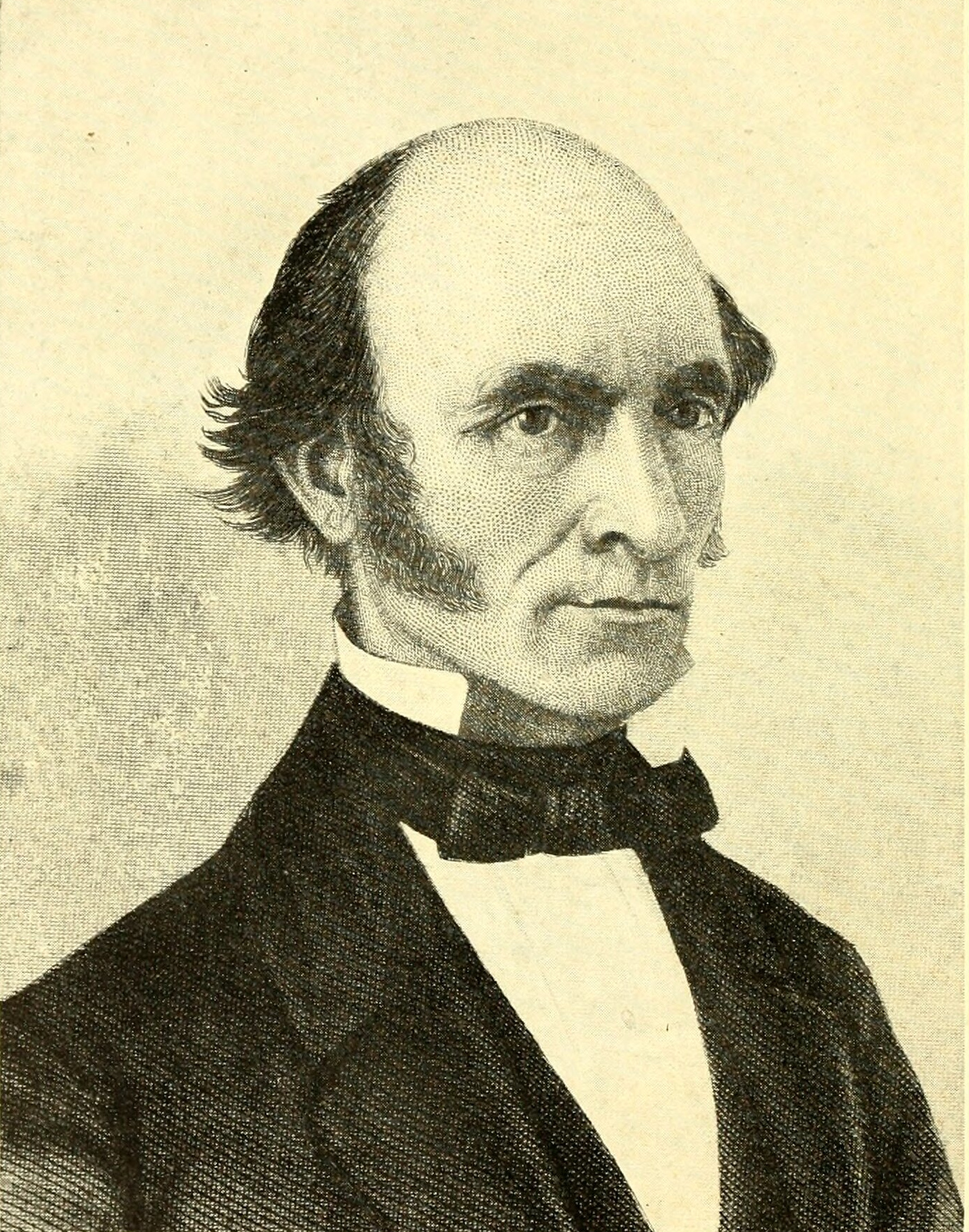

Member of the Illinois Senate
- In office 1852–1860

Personal details
- Born: November 4, 1822 Culpeper County, Virginia, U.S.
- Died: March 30, 1880 (aged 57)
- Party: Democratic
- Spouse: Mariah Elizabeth Jennings
- Children: 9, including William and Charles
- Profession: Politician

Silas Lillard Bryan (November 4, 1822 – March 30, 1880) was a judge and member of the Illinois Senate.

Born in Culpeper, Virginia, Silas Lillard Bryan, of Scots-Irish and English descent, was an avid Jacksonian Democrat and supporter of states' rights. Silas won election to the Illinois State Senate in 1852 on a platform on preventing the immigration of Free Negroes into Illinois. He won again in 1856 but was defeated for re-election in 1860 and in 1878. During the American Civil War, he was a Copperhead Democrat.

He did win election as a state circuit judge for the 2nd Judicial Circuit, and moved to a 520-acre (210.4 ha) farm north of Salem, Illinois in 1866, living in a ten-room house that was the envy of Marion County. He retained his position on the bench through 1873.

Bryan and his wife, Mariah Elizabeth (née Jennings), were the parents of nine children, including William Jennings Bryan and Charles W. Bryan. Also, Ruth Bryan Owen was a granddaughter.
