= Arthur J. Weaver =

American politician

Arthur Jerard Weaver
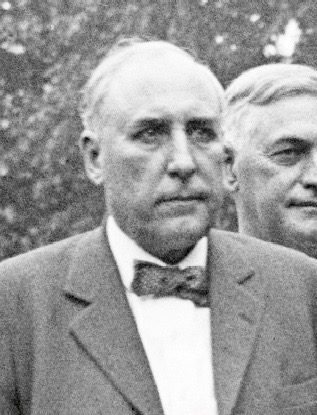

22nd Governor of Nebraska
- In office January 3, 1929 – January 8, 1931
- Lieutenant: George A. Williams
- Preceded by: Adam McMullen
- Succeeded by: Charles W. Bryan

Member of the Nebraska House of Representatives
- In office 1899

Personal details
- Born: November 18, 1873 Falls City, Nebraska, US
- Died: October 18, 1945 (aged 71) Falls City, Nebraska, US
- Resting place: Steele Cemetery, Falls City, Nebraska
- Party: Republican
- Education: University of Nebraska
- Occupation: Attorney

Arthur Jerard Weaver (November 18, 1873 – October 18, 1945) was an American politician in the U.S. state of Nebraska. A Republican, he served as the 22nd governor of Nebraska.

Weaver was born near Falls City, Nebraska. He was educated at Wyoming Seminary in Pennsylvania and he earned an undergraduate degree in 1895 and a law degree in 1896 from the University of Nebraska College of Law. He was a founding member of the Beta Tau chapter of the Delta Tau Delta fraternity at the University of Nebraska in 1894. He was married to Maude E. Hart on September 2, 1908.

== Career ==
After graduating from the University of Nebraska, Weaver opened his own practice in Falls City, Nebraska. He was city attorney from 1899 to 1902 and county attorney from 1902 to 1903. In 1904 he suspended his practice to concentrate on his farming and stock-raising interests. He served on the city council and was elected mayor of Falls City in 1915.

Weaver was elected to the Nebraska House of Representatives in 1899. He was a delegate to the state constitutional convention in 1919 to 1920, and served as president of that body; a presidential elector for Nebraska in 1920.

Weaver ran for Governor of Nebraska in 1928 and won, serving from 1929 to 1931. During his tenure, the entire country was suffering from the Wall Street stock market crash. After losing re-election in 1930, he returned to Falls City. He was a delegate to the 1932 Republican National Convention and chair of the Richardson County Republican Party in 1940.

== Death ==
Weaver died in his home in Falls City on October 18, 1945, shortly after suffering a stroke. He is interred at Steele Cemetery in Falls City.

Political offices
Preceded by Adam McMullen	Governor of Nebraska; January 3, 1929 – January 8, 1931	Succeeded by Charles W. Bryan
Party political offices
Preceded by Adam McMullen	Republican nominee for Governor of Nebraska; 1928, 1930	Succeeded by Dwight Griswold
