= Melvin O. McLaughlin =

American politician

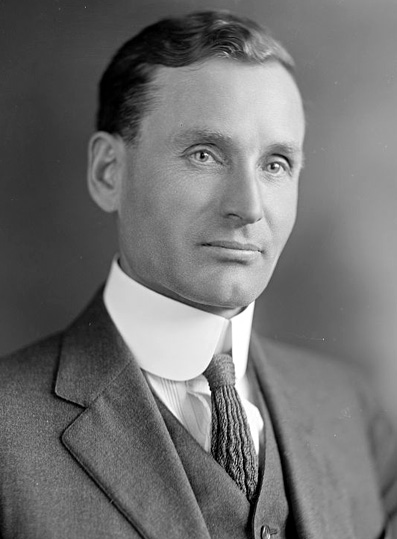

Member of the U.S. House of Representatives from Nebraska's 4th district
- In office March 4, 1919 – March 3, 1927
- Preceded by: Charles Henry Sloan
- Succeeded by: John N. Norton

Personal details
- Born: August 8, 1876 Osceola, Iowa
- Died: June 18, 1928 (aged 51) York, Nebraska
- Party: Republican

Melvin Orlando McLaughlin (August 8, 1876 – June 18, 1928) was an American Republican Party politician.

== Biography ==
Born in Osceola, Iowa on August 8, 1876, he moved to Nebraska in 1884. He graduated from College View High School, and graduated from the Lincoln, Nebraska Normal University and the Nebraska State Normal School at Peru (now Peru State College). He taught school near Lincoln from 1895 to 1900. He went back to school at the Iowa Christian College at Oskaloosa, Iowa; Omaha University (now University of Nebraska at Omaha), and the Union Biblical Seminary in Dayton, Ohio, becoming a minister.

He served as a minister in the United Brethren Church in Omaha from 1900 to 1913. He moved to York, Nebraska, in 1913 becoming president of York College until 1918. In 1918 he ran for the Sixty-sixth congress as a Republican representing the 4th district of Nebraska. He won the election and was reelected three more times serving from March 4, 1919, to March 3, 1927. He ran and lost in 1926 for the 70th congress. Afterwards he engaged in mining and investments. He died in York on June 18, 1928, and is buried in Greenwood Cemetery.

U.S. House of Representatives
Preceded by Charles Henry Sloan (R)	Member of the U.S. House of Representatives from Nebraska's 4th congressional district March 4, 1919 – March 3, 1927	Succeeded by John N. Norton (D)
