= Roy W. Johnson (politician) =

American politician

23rd Lieutenant Governor of Nebraska
- In office January 7, 1943 – January 9, 1947
- Governor: Dwight Griswold
- Preceded by: William E. Johnson
- Succeeded by: Robert B. Crosby

Member of the Nebraska Legislature from the 34th district
- In office 1937–1939

Personal details
- Born: June 19, 1882 Weeping Water, Nebraska
- Died: December 2, 1947 (aged 65) Chicago, Illinois
- Party: Republican

Roy William Johnson (June 19, 1882 – December 2, 1947) was a Nebraska politician who served as the 23rd lieutenant governor of Nebraska from 1943 to 1947. Johnson also served in the Nebraska Legislature from what was then the 34th District from 1937 to 1939.

Johnson was born in Weeping Water, Nebraska, in 1882. He graduated from high school in Sumner, Nebraska, and then went on to Lincoln Business College. He served on the school board in Sumner and in Buffalo County, Nebraska. He defeated John R. Long in the November 1936 election for the 34th district of the Nebraska Legislature. However, he failed to get re-nominated for a second term in the primary in August 1938.

Johnson was elected Nebraska Lieutenant Governor in 1942, winning in a Republican primary field of seven candidates. He was reelected in 1944. However, prior to the Republican primaries in 1946, the Nebraska Republican Party met in a pre-primary convention to endorse particular candidates before the primaries. The convention endorsed recent Speaker of the Nebraska Legislature Robert B. Crosby instead of Johnson, who was the incumbent. Some alleged that the reason Johnson was not endorsed was a perception among state legislators that he was not adept at presiding over the Nebraska Legislature or knowing the rules of procedure. Johnson's lack of endorsement by the pre-primary convention was credited with his subsequent loss in the Republican primaries.

Johnson died of a heart attack while attending a convention in Chicago on December 2, 1947.
