= R. H. Kreutz =

American politician (1895–1994)

Member of the Nebraska Legislature from the 25th district
- In office January 2, 1951 – January 6, 1953
- Preceded by: Lester Anderson
- Succeeded by: Lester Anderson

Personal details
- Born: July 31, 1895 Harvard, Nebraska
- Died: March 16, 1994 (aged 98) Harvard, Nebraska
- Party: Democratic
- Spouse: Mamie Wilson (m. 1922; died 1964)
- Children: 5
- Occupation: Farmer, stockman

Military service
- Allegiance: United States
- Branch/service: United States Army

Rolland H. Kreutz (July 31, 1895 – March 16, 1994) was a Democratic politician from Nebraska who served as a member of the Nebraska Legislature from the 25th district from 1951 to 1953.

== Early life ==
Kreutz was born in Harvard, Nebraska, in 1895, and graduated from Harvard High School. He served in the United States Army during World War I, and worked as a farmer and stockman in Giltner. In 1938, he ran for the Hamilton County Commission from the 2nd district. Kreutz won the Democratic nomination unopposed, but narrowly lost to Republican County Commissioner C. B. Mabon in the general election. He challenged Mabon again in 1942, and defeated him. Kreutz was re-elected in 1946.

== Nebraska Legislature ==
In 1950, Kreutz ran for the Nebraska Legislature from the 25th district, based in Clay, Hamilton, and Polk counties, challenging incumbent State Senator Lester Anderson for re-election. Kreutz placed first over Anderson in the nonpartisan primary, winning 57 percent of the vote, and then defeated him in the general election, receiving 54 percent of the vote to Anderson's 46 percent.

Kreutz ran for re-election in 1952, and was challenged by Anderson. He placed second in the primary, receiving 52 percent of the vote to Anderson's 48 percent, and then lost the general election by an identical 52–48 percent margin.

== Death ==
Kreutz died on March 16, 1994.
