= Jay Hastings =

American politician (1878–1939)

Member of the Nebraska Legislature from the 25th district
- In office January 3, 1939 – November 14, 1939
- Preceded by: John N. Norton
- Succeeded by: Ray Thomas

Member of the Nebraska House of Representatives from the 52nd district
- In office January 1, 1935 – January 5, 1937
- Preceded by: W. F. Crozier
- Succeeded by: Position abolished

Personal details
- Born: 1878 Aurora, Illinois
- Died: November 14, 1939 (aged 66) Omaha, Nebraska
- Party: Republican
- Spouse: Tillie S. Stiles (m. 1899)
- Children: 1
- Occupation: Farmer, realtor, merchant

Jay Hastings (1878 – November 14, 1939) was a Republican politician from Nebraska who served as a member of the Nebraska House of Representatives from the 52nd district from 1935 to 1937 and as a member of the Nebraska Legislature from the 25th district from January 1939 until his death in November 1939.

== Early life ==
Hastings was born in Aurora, Illinois, in 1878, and moved to Nebraska in 1882. He attended grade school in David City, and worked as a farmer, realtor, and merchant. Hastings was active in the local business and civic community, serving on the Osceola City Council and on the city Park Board.

== Nebraska House of Representatives ==
Hastings ran for the Nebraska House of Representatives from the 52nd district in 1934, challenging Democratic State Representative W. F. Crozier for re-election. Hastings won the Republican nomination and narrowly defeated Crozier, winning 50.4 percent of the vote to Crozier's 49.6 percent.

== 1936 County Court campaign ==
In 1936, the State House and State Senate were consolidated into a unicameral legislature. Accordingly, Hastings opted to run for Polk County Court to succeed retiring judge W. W. Norton. He finished in fourth place in the primary and did not advance to the general election.

== Nebraska Legislature ==
Hastings announced that he would run for the Nebraska Legislature in 1938 from the 25th district, which included Clay, Hamilton, and Polk counties. Incumbent State Senator John N. Norton declined to seek re-election to a second term, and Hastings faced former State Representatives Carl Bremer and Ray Thomas, as well as Vern Hagarity, Nels Torstenson, and Homer McKelvie in the nonpartisan primary. Hastings placed second, winning 22 percent of the vote to Thomas's 24 percent, and they proceeded to the general election. Hastings narrowly defeated Thomas, winning 52 percent of the vote to his 48 percent.

== Death ==
Hastings died on November 14, 1939, at Immanuel Hospital in Omaha, Nebraska, after experiencing a blood infection.
