= Eugene J. Hainer =

American politician

Eugene Jerome Hainer
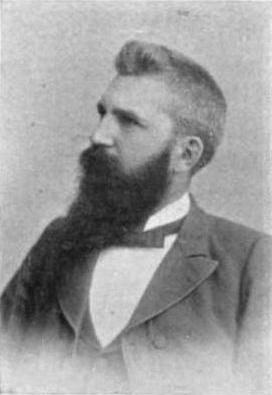
- From 1895's Biographical Sketches of the Nebraska Legislature and State and National Officers of Nebraska

Member of the U.S. House of Representatives from Nebraska's 4th district
- In office March 4, 1893 – March 3, 1897
- Preceded by: District created
- Succeeded by: William Ledyard Stark

Personal details
- Born: August 16, 1851 Pécs, Hungary
- Died: March 17, 1929 (aged 77) Omaha, Nebraska, US
- Party: Republican

Eugene Jerome Hainer (August 16, 1851 – March 17, 1929) was an American Republican Party politician.

== Biography ==
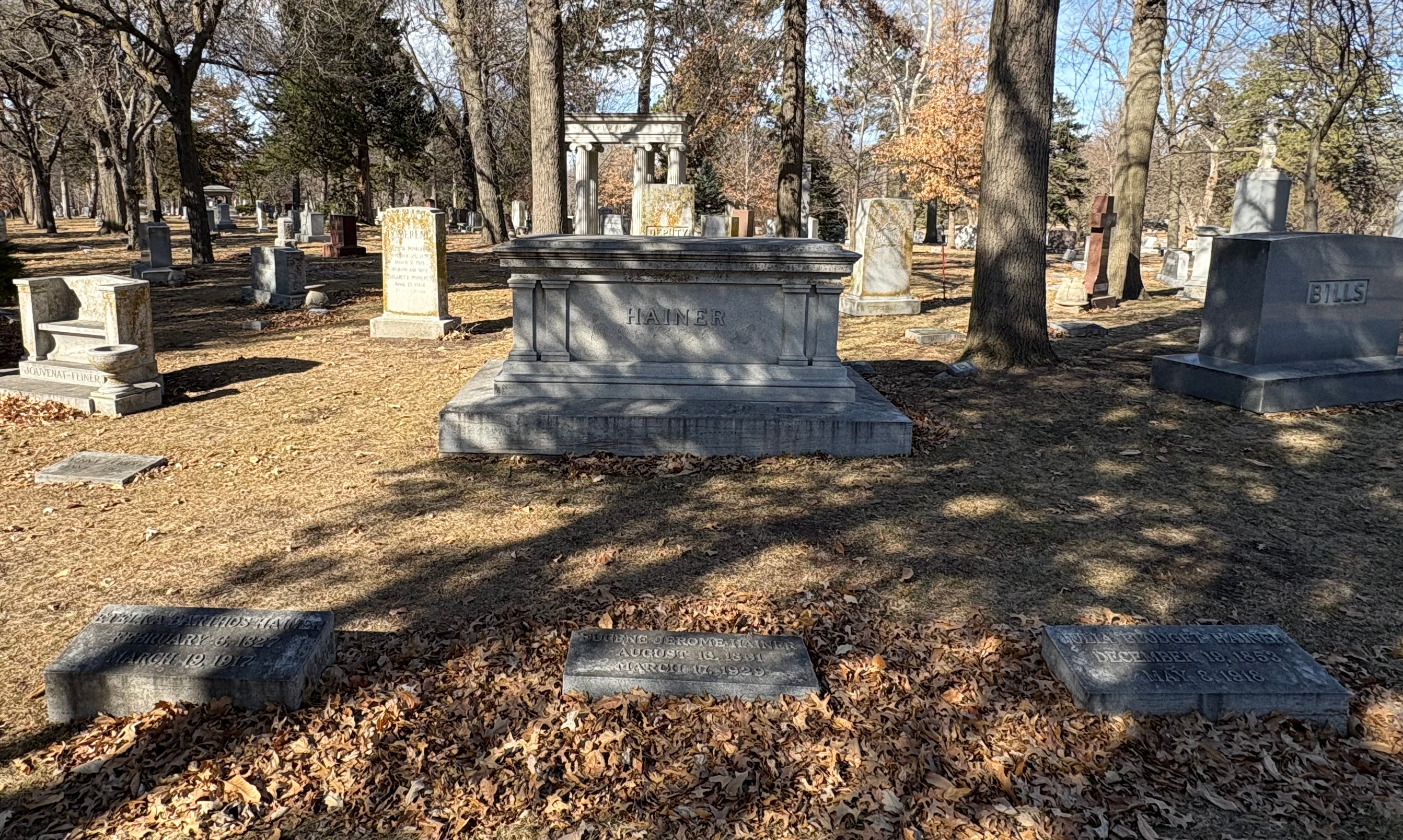
Hainer's grave at Wyuka Cemetery

Born in Pécs, Hungary in 1851, he immigrated to the United States with his parents settling in Columbia, Missouri, in 1854. He later moved with them in 1861 to the Hungarian settlement of New Buda, Iowa founded by George Pomutz. He spent his childhood on a farm near Garden Grove, Iowa. Was educated in Garden Grove Seminary school and then in the Iowa Agricultural College. He graduated from the law department of Simpson College in Indianola, Iowa in 1876 and was admitted to the bar in the same year.

He set up practice in Aurora, Nebraska, in 1877, becoming interested in banking and in a group of creameries in southern Nebraska. He was elected as a Republican to the Fifty-third and Fifty-fourth Congresses (March 4, 1893 – March 3, 1897). He was an unsuccessful candidate for reelection in 1896 to the Fifty-fifth Congress. He resumed practice in Aurora and moved to Lincoln, Nebraska, in 1904 while still practicing. He retired in July 1928 and moved to Omaha, Nebraska, where he resided until his death on March 17, 1929. He is buried in Wyuka Cemetery, in Lincoln, Nebraska.

U.S. House of Representatives
Preceded by District Created	Member of the U.S. House of Representatives from Nebraska's 4th congressional district March 4, 1893 – March 3, 1897	Succeeded by William Ledyard Stark (P)
