= Charles H. Sloan =

American politician

Charles Henry Sloan
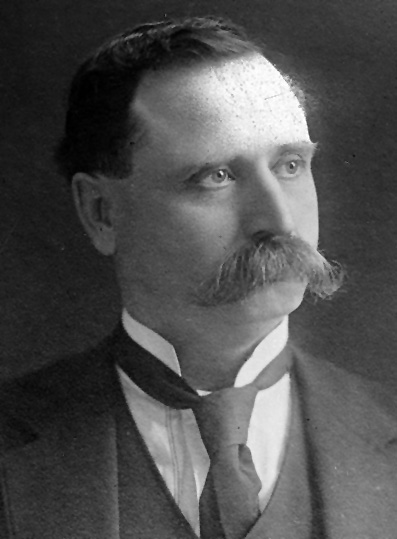

Member of the U.S. House of Representatives from Nebraska's 4th district
- In office March 4, 1929 – March 3, 1931
- Preceded by: John N. Norton
- Succeeded by: John N. Norton
- In office March 4, 1911 – March 3, 1919
- Preceded by: Edmund H. Hinshaw
- Succeeded by: Melvin O. McLaughlin

Personal details
- Born: May 2, 1863 Monticello, Iowa
- Died: June 2, 1946 (aged 83) Geneva, Nebraska
- Party: Republican

Charles Henry Sloan (May 2, 1863 – June 2, 1946) was an American politician who served as a member of the United States House of Representatives from Nebraska's 4th congressional district from 1911 to 1919, and again from 1929 to 1931.

== Biography ==
Born in Monticello, Iowa on May 2, 1863, Sloan graduated from Iowa State Agricultural College (now Iowa State University) at Ames, Iowa in 1884. He moved to Fairmont, Nebraska and became the city schools superintendent from 1884 to 1887. He studied law and was admitted to the bar in 1887. He started practice in Fairmont but then moved to Geneva, Nebraska in 1891. He became the director of the Geneva State Bank and then the prosecuting attorney of Fillmore County from 1890 to 1894.

He was elected to the Nebraska State Senate from 1894 to 1896. He was the chairman of the Republican State convention in 1903. In 1911, he was elected to the 62nd Congress and the three succeeding congress as a Republican (March 4, 1911 – March 3, 1919). He voted on April 5, 1917, against declaring war on Germany. He declined to run for re-election in 1918, instead pursuing a run for Senate, but lost his party's nomination to the incumbent Senator George W. Norris. In 1928, he ran again for the 71st Congress and won, serving from March 4, 1929, to March 3, 1931. He lost re-election in 1930, resuming practice of law in Geneva, as well as working in banking. He died in Geneva on June 2, 1946, and is buried in the Geneva Cemetery.

U.S. House of Representatives
Preceded by Edmund H. Hinshaw (R)	Member of the U.S. House of Representatives from Nebraska's 4th congressional district March 4, 1911 – March 3, 1919	Succeeded by Melvin O. McLaughlin (R)
Preceded by John N. Norton (D)	Member of the U.S. House of Representatives from Nebraska's 4th congressional district March 4, 1929 – March 3, 1931	Succeeded by John N. Norton (D)
