= Lester Anderson =

American politician (1894–1979)

Member of the Nebraska Legislature from the 25th district
- In office January 6, 1953 – January 1, 1957
- Preceded by: R. H. Kreutz
- Succeeded by: Hans Jensen
- In office January 2, 1945 – January 2, 1951
- Preceded by: Ray Thomas
- Succeeded by: R. H. Kreutz

Personal details
- Born: November 17, 1894 Dodge, Nebraska
- Died: December 21, 1979 (aged 85) Omaha, Nebraska
- Party: Republican
- Spouse: Mary
- Children: 1
- Education: Midland College
- Occupation: Farmer, banker, salesman, hotelier

Military service
- Allegiance: United States
- Branch/service: United States Army; United States Marine Corps
- Years of service: 1914–1917 (Army); 1917–1921 (Marine Corps)

Lester H. Anderson (November 17, 1894 – December 21, 1979) was a Republican politician from Nebraska who served as a member of the Nebraska Legislature from the 25th district from 1945 to 1951 and again from 1953 to 1957.

== Early life ==
Anderson was born in Dodge, Nebraska, in 1894. He attended grade school in Fremont and Midland College. Anderson was a bank clerk before he enlisted in the U.S. Army in 1914, and then served in the U.S. Marine Corps from 1917 to 1921. Upon being discharged from the military, he returned to Nebraska and purchased the Aurora Hotel in Aurora.

== Nebraska Legislature ==
In 1942, Anderson ran for the legislature from the 25th district, challenging Ray Thomas for re-election. He placed third in the primary, receiving 21 percent of the vote to Thomas's 53 percent and N. P. Peterson's 26 percent.

Thomas declined to run for re-election in 1944, and Anderson ran to succeed him. He placed third in the primary, receiving 23 percent of the vote to Peterson's 27 percent and Carl Anderson's 26 percent. However, on July 3, 1944, Peterson died in a car accident, and Anderson, as the third-place finisher, was automatically placed on the general election ballot. Anderson won the general election with 56 percent of the vote.

In 1946, Anderson ran for re-election, and was challenged by veteran John Davis, newspaperman Will Maurine, and Clay County Supervisor Karl McFadden. Anderson placed first in the primary with 34 percent of the vote, and advanced to the general election with Davis, who placed second with 24 percent. Davis withdrew from the election on September 16, 1946, and Maupin was placed on the ballot. Anderson defeated Maurine in the general election with 58 percent of the vote.

Anderson ran for a third term in 1948 and was challenged by farmer Hans Jensen and grocer C. W. Moon. Anderson won 52 percent of the vote, and advanced to the general election with Jensen, who narrowly placed second with 24 percent and defeated Moon by 10 votes. Anderson ultimately defeated Jensen with 60 percent of the vote.

In 1950, Anderson sought re-election to a fourth term. He was challenged by Hamilton County Commissioner R. H. Kreutz. In the primary, Kreutz placed first over Anderson with 57 percent of the vote. In the general election, Kreutz defeated Anderson with 54 percent of the vote.

Anderson challenged Kreutz for re-election in 1952. Anderson narrowly placed first in the primary with 52 percent of the vote, and following a contentious campaign, Anderson unseated Kreutz with 52 percent of the vote.

In 1954, Anderson ran for re-election and was challenged by Lisle Hanna, a former Clay County Judge and newspaper owner. Hanna won 53 percent of the vote to Anderson's 47 percent in the primary election, and in the general election, Anderson defeated Hanna by 44 votes.

== 1956 congressional campaign ==
Anderson declined to seek re-election in 1956, and instead ran for the U.S. House from the 3rd district, challenging Republican Congressman R. D. Harrison for re-election. Though the campaign was closely watched, Harrison won renomination by a wide margin, winning 51 percent of the vote to Anderson's 16 percent.

== Subsequent campaigns ==
In 1958, Anderson ran for the legislature again, challenging State Senator Hans Jensen, who succeeded Anderson, for re-election. Jensen placed first over Anderson in the primary, winning 57 percent of the vote, and won the general election with 59 percent of the vote.

Anderson announced that he would challenge Lieutenant Governor Dwight Burney for renomination in the Republican primary in 1960. He placed a distant third in the primary, winning 19 percent of the vote to Burney's 53 percent. He challenged Burney again in 1962, and lost by a wider margin, receiving 26 percent of the vote to Burney's 74 percent.

== Death ==
Anderson died on December 21, 1979.
