= 1942 Nebraska lieutenant gubernatorial election =

- November 3, 1942

Nominee	Roy W. Johnson	Harry P. Conklin
Party	Republican	Democratic
Popular vote	239,374	107,617
Percentage	69.0%	31.0%
Lieutenant Governor before election
William E. Johnson
Republican
Elected Lieutenant Governor
Roy W. Johnson
Republican

The 1942 Nebraska lieutenant gubernatorial election was held on November 3, 1942, and featured Roy W. Johnson, the Republican nominee, defeating Democratic nominee Harry P. Conklin. The incumbent lieutenant governor, William E. Johnson, decided not to seek reelection in order to run for United States House of Representatives in Nebraska's First District in 1942.

== Democratic primary ==
=== Candidates ===
- Harry P. Conklin, farmer from near Grand Island, Nebraska, and former commissioner of public lands and buildings
- Edward A. Dosek, businessman, banker, and insurance agent from Lincoln, Nebraska, and former head accountant for the Nebraska State Treasurer from 1933 to 1937
- William H. Smith, former Nebraska State Tax Commissioner from 1923 to 1925 and again from 1931 to 1941

=== Results ===
Democratic primary results
Party	Candidate	Votes	%
Democratic	Harry P. Conklin	30,847	43.50
Democratic	William H. Smith	25,493	35.95
Democratic	Edward A. Dosek	14,571	20.55

== Republican primary ==
=== Candidates ===
- John McArthur
- Jack Devoe
- Dr. Harvey E. Glatfelter
- Rufus M. Howard, Speaker of the Nebraska Legislature and member of the Nebraska Legislature from what was then District 39 (endorsed by Nebraska Governor Dwight P. Griswold)
- Roy W. Johnson, former member of the Nebraska Legislature from what was then District 34
- William L. Randall
- Harry L. Reed, insurance agent and property manager in Lincoln, Nebraska

=== Results ===
Republican primary results
Party	Candidate	Votes	%
Republican	Roy W. Johnson	22,549	27.71
Republican	Rufus M. Howard	18,679	22.96
Republican	Harry L. Reed	15,427	18.96
Republican	John McArthur	12,482	15.34
Republican	Jack Devoe	7,917	9.73
Republican	Harvey E. Glatfelter	3,137	3.86
Republican	William L. Randall	1,170	1.44

== General election ==
=== Results ===
Nebraska lieutenant gubernatorial election, 1942
Party	Candidate	Votes	%
Republican	Roy W. Johnson	239,374	68.99
Democratic	Harry P. Conklin	107,617	31.01
Total votes		346,991	100.00
Republican hold			

== See also ==
- 1942 Nebraska gubernatorial election
