= Will M. Maupin =

American newspaper worker (1863–1948)

Will M. Maupin (1863–1948) was a newspaper man from Nebraska who worked for papers like the Omaha World-Herald, The Commoner, and the Hastings Democrat.

== Early life ==
Born August 31, 1863 in Callaway County, Missouri, Maupin's family supported the northern cause and moved to the Illinois during the American Civil War where his father joined the Union Army. After the war, the family moved back to Missouri, where Maupin was educated until he decided to leave school and start working at the local paper. In May 1879, Maupin took his first job at the Republican Holt County Sentinel working to edit articles and there began his sixty year career in the publishing world. During the next ten years Maupin acted as a typographical tourist traveling around the continent writing and publishing articles in places as far as Winnipeg, Canada and Caracas, Venezuela. After living the tramp lifestyle Maupin settled for the first time and published his own newspaper the Meteor in Holt, Missouri just across the river from Falls City, Nebraska.

== Nebraska publishing ==
In 1886 Maupin moved to Nebraska and began his career here by working for the Falls City Journal and the Fall City News. After being in the state for only a few months he attempted to start his second newspaper in Rulo, Nebraska the Rulo Weekly Bridgeman but the paper lasted for less than six months and Maupin was once again on the move. Finding himself in Miden, Nebraska Maupin worked for the Kearney Country Gazette and the Hastings Independent. Over the next few years Maupin moved around the state, again attempted to start another newspaper, and was once more unsuccessful.

In November 1890 Maupin accepted the position as the Lincoln correspondent for the Omaha World-Herald and by 1893 the entire family moved from Minden to Lincoln with Maupin's place at the Herald firmly held. Maupin's work with the Herald turned quickly to the work of a political correspondent. In addition, while the Trans-Mississippi and International Exposition was in Omaha Maupin covered the event. Along with his political work Maupin wrote the popular "Limnings" column for the paper that included editorials, anecdotes, and poems. In 1898 Maupin collated and created new stories from the column and published the book Limnings and enjoyed a fair amount of success, both monetarily and professionally, from the book. However even after its publishing Maupin always saw himself as a newspaperman rather than an author.

During his coverage of the Democratic national convention in 1900 Maupin was to introduced to William Jennings Bryan. When the first issue of Bryan's The Commoner was published Maupin's new column "Whether Common Or Not". The column was like "Limnings" but this new version for The Commoner included more direct political comments. Maupin supported much of Bryan's political agenda and it is noted that his time at The Commoner was notably some of the happiest and most stable years of his life.

== Later years ==
After all of his years of working as a newspaper man Maurpin began getting involved with community politics and in 1918 served as director of the Bureau of Publicity under the Nebraska Conservation and Welfare Commission. In addition, he served as a custodian of the Scotts Bluff National Monument. Maupin would then return to writing and created a column called "Sunny Side Up" for the Omaha Bee that followed in his "Limnings" and "Whether Common or Not" column aspects. In 1934, Maupin ran successfully for the State Railway Commission. However, his public service work would never be enough to fulfill his life and after his term expired Maupin returned to newspapering, editing the Clay County Sun until his death in 1948.
