= 1926 Nebraska gubernatorial election =

- November 2, 1926
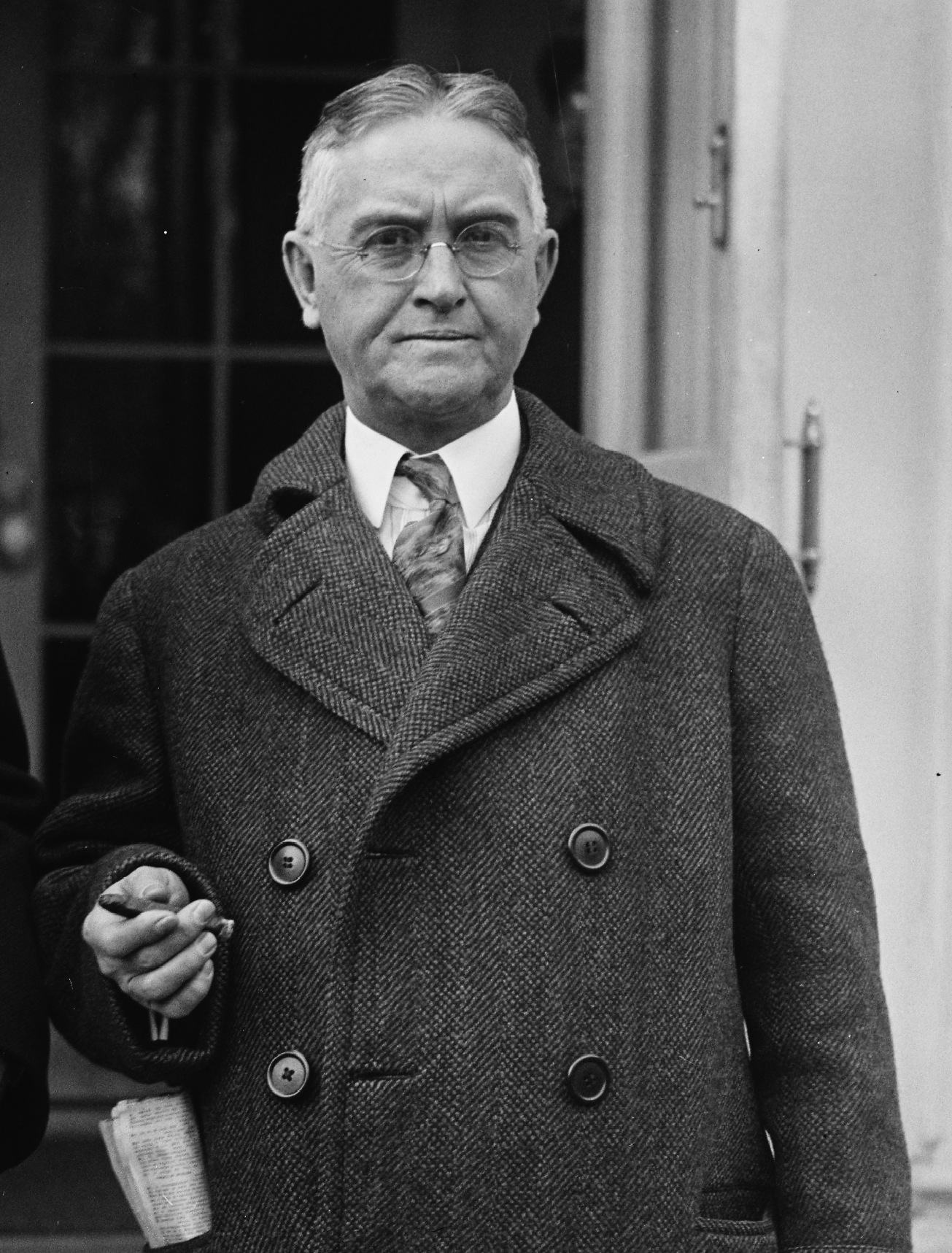

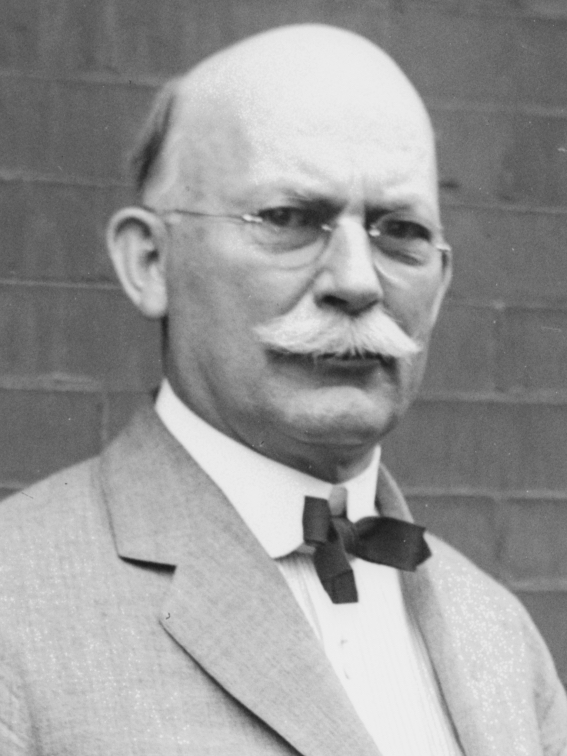
Nominee	Adam McMullen	Charles W. Bryan
Party	Republican	Democratic
Popular vote	206,120	202,688
Percentage	49.82%	48.99%
- County results McMullen: 40–50% 50–60% 60–70% Bryan: 40–50% 50–60% 60–70%
Governor before election
Adam McMullen
Republican
Elected Governor
Adam McMullen
Republican

The 1926 Nebraska gubernatorial election was held on November 2, 1926, and featured incumbent Governor Adam McMullen, a Republican, narrowly defeating Democratic nominee, former Governor Charles W. Bryan, to win a second and final two-year term in office.

== Democratic primary ==
=== Candidates ===
- Charles W. Bryan, former Governor

=== Results ===
Democratic primary results
Party	Candidate	Votes	%
Democratic	Charles W. Bryan	81,595	100.00

== Progressive primary ==
=== Candidates ===
- Charles W. Bryan, former Governor
- Roy M. Harrop
- Adam McMullen, incumbent Governor

=== Results ===
Progressive primary results
Party	Candidate	Votes	%
Progressive Party (United States, 1924)	Roy M. Harrop	375	97.40
Democratic	Charles W. Bryan	8	2.08
Republican	Adam McMullen (incumbent)	2	0.52

== Republican primary ==
=== Candidates ===
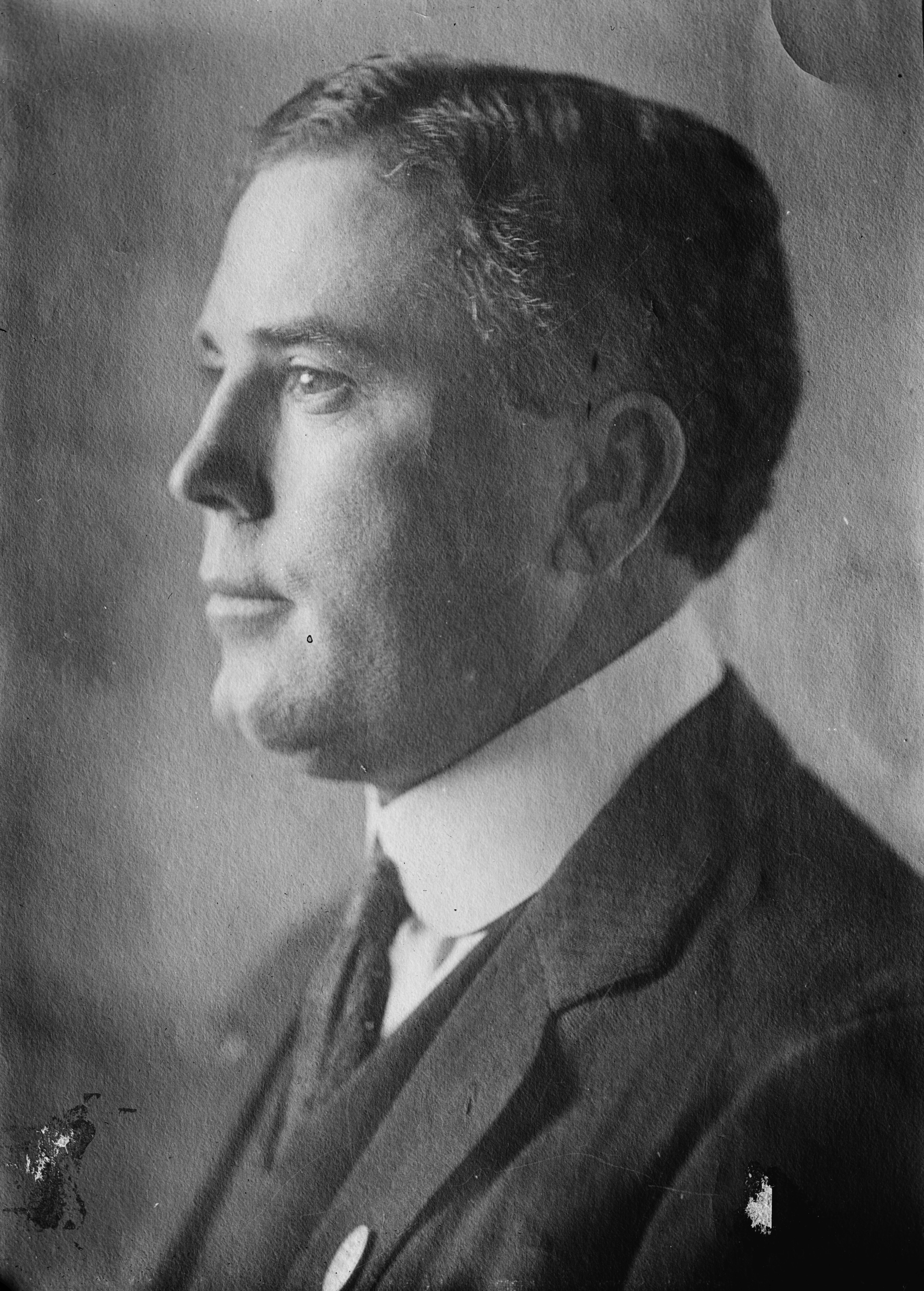
Roy M. Harrop

- Fred G. Johnson, former Lieutenant Governor
- Adam McMullen, incumbent Governor
- Robert G. Ross

=== Results ===
Republican primary results
Party	Candidate	Votes	%
Republican	Adam McMullen (incumbent)	109,944	72.04
Republican	Fred G. Johnson	31,556	20.68
Republican	Robert G. Ross	11,122	7.29

== General election ==
=== Results ===
Nebraska gubernatorial election, 1926
Party	Candidate	Votes	%
Republican	Adam McMullen (incumbent)	206,120	49.82%
Democratic	Charles W. Bryan	202,688	48.99%
Progressive Party (United States, 1924)	Roy M. Harrop	4,937	1.19%
Write-in	Others	7	>0.01%
Total votes		413,752	100.0%
Republican hold			

==== By County ====
By county

County	Person Democratic		Person Republican		Various candidates Other parties		Margin		Total votes
County	#	%	#	%	#	%	#	%	Total votes
Adams County									
Antelope County									
Arthur County									
Banner County									
Blaine County									
Boone County									
Box Butte County									
Boyd County									
Brown County									
Buffalo County									
Burt County									
Butler County									
Cass County									
Cedar County									
Chase County									
Cherry County									
Cheyenne County									
Clay County									
Colfax County									
Cuming County									
Custer County									
Dakota County									
Dawes County									
Dawson County									
Deuel County									
Dixon County									
Dodge County									
Douglas County									
Dundy County									
Fillmore County									
Franklin County									
Frontier County									
Furnas County									
Gage County									
Garden County									
Garfield County									
Gosper County									
Grant County									
Greeley County									
Hall County									
Hamilton County									
Hayes County									
Hitchcock County									
Holt County									
Hooker County									
Howard County									
Jefferson County									
Johnson County									
Kearney County									
Keith County									
Keya Paha County									
Kimball County									
Knox County									
Lancaster County									
Lincoln County									
Logan County									
Loup County									
Madison County									
McPherson County									
Merrick County									
Morrill County									
Nance County									
Nance County									
Nemaha County									
Nuckolls County									
Otoe County									
Pawnee County									
Perkins County									
Phelps County									
Pierce County									
Platte County									
Polk County									
Red Willow County									
Richardson County									
Rock County									
Saline County									
Sarpy County									
Saunders County									
Scotts Bluff County									
Seward County									
Sheridan County									
Sioux County									
Stanton County									
Thayer County									
Stanton County									
Thurston County									
Valley County									
Washington County									
Wayne County									
Webster County									
Wheeler County									
York County									
Totals									

== See also ==
- 1926 Nebraska lieutenant gubernatorial election
