= Dan B. Butler =

American football coach and politician

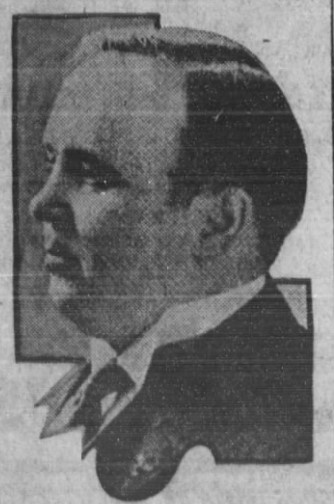
- Photograph of Butler, c. 1913

Biographical details
- Born: January 18, 1879; Ottawa, Illinois, U.S.
- Education: Creighton

Coaching career (HC unless noted)
- 1905: Creighton

Daniel Bernard Butler (January 18, 1879) was an American college football coach and politician. He was the head football coach at Creighton University in 1905. Butler served as the mayor of Omaha, Nebraska from 1936 to 1945.

== See also ==
- History of Omaha, Nebraska
- List of mayors of Omaha, Nebraska

Party political offices
Preceded by Charles W. Bryan	Progressive nominee for Governor of Nebraska; 1924	Succeeded by Roy M. Harrop
