= Charles W. Bryan =

American politician (1867–1945)

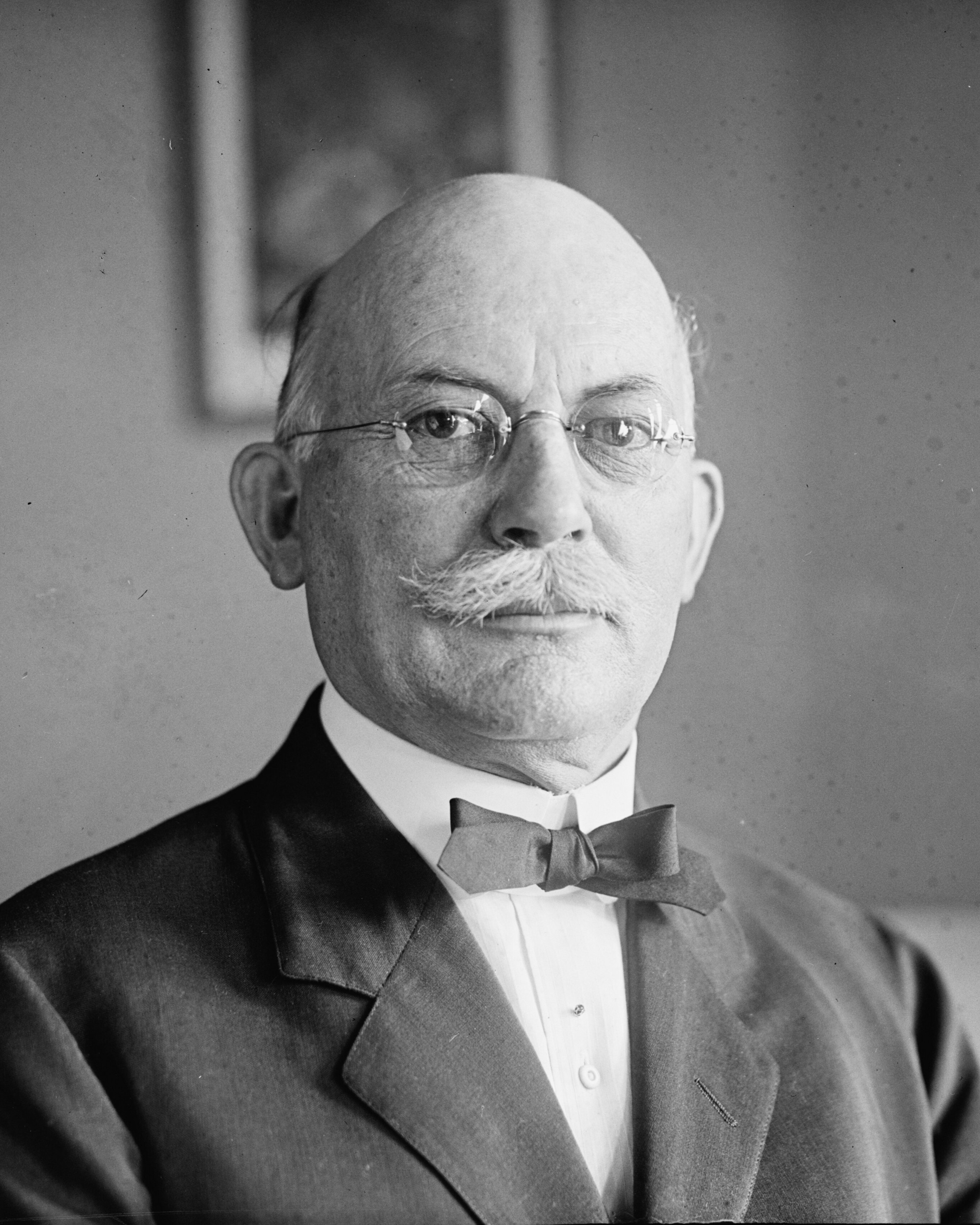
- Bryan in 1924

20th and 23rd Governor of Nebraska
- In office January 8, 1931 – January 3, 1935
- Lieutenant: Theodore Metcalfe; Walter H. Jurgensen
- Preceded by: Arthur J. Weaver
- Succeeded by: Roy Cochran
- In office January 3, 1923 – January 8, 1925
- Lieutenant: Fred Johnson
- Preceded by: Samuel McKelvie
- Succeeded by: Adam McMullen

23rd and 30th Mayor of Lincoln
- In office 1935–1937
- Preceded by: Fenton Fleming
- Succeeded by: Oren S. Copeland
- In office 1915–1917
- Preceded by: Frank Zehrung
- Succeeded by: John Miller

Personal details
- Born: Charles Wayland Bryan; February 10, 1867 Salem, Illinois, U.S.
- Died: March 4, 1945 (aged 78) Lincoln, Nebraska, U.S.
- Resting place: Wyuka Cemetery
- Party: Democratic
- Spouse: Elizabeth Brokaw
- Children: 3
- Parent(s): Silas Bryan; Mariah Elizabeth Jennings
- Relatives: William Jennings Bryan (brother); William Sherman Jennings (cousin)
- Education: Illinois College; University of Chicago

Charles Wayland Bryan (February 10, 1867 – March 4, 1945) was an American businessman and politician who served as the 20th and 23rd governor of Nebraska from 1923 to 1925 and again from 1931 to 1935. A member of the Democratic Party, he also served two terms as the mayor of Lincoln, Nebraska, and was the Democratic nominee for vice president in 1924. He was the younger brother of prominent Democratic politician William Jennings Bryan.

== Biography ==
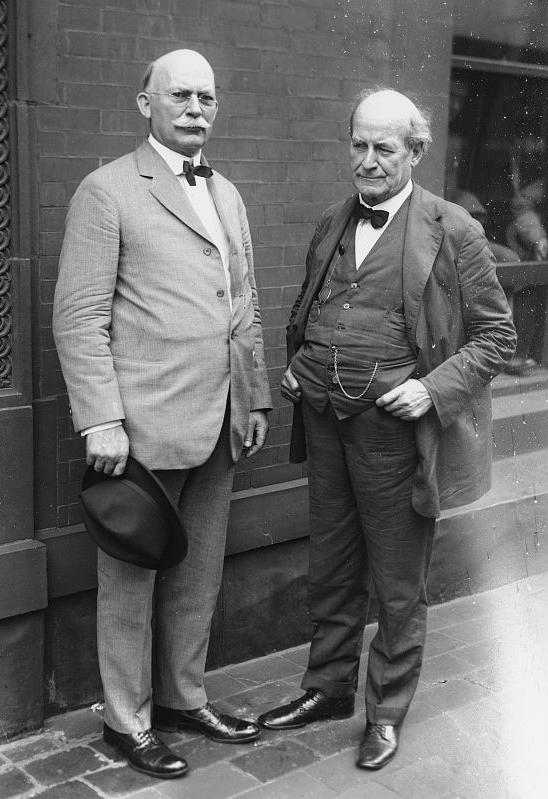
Charles W. Bryan (left) with William Jennings Bryan

Charles Wayland Bryan was born in Salem, Illinois on February 10, 1867, to Silas Lillard Bryan and Mariah Elizabeth (Jennings) Bryan. Charles was one of nine children of Silas and Mariah, the first three of their children died during infancy. He had four of whom lived to adulthood. Silas was a Baptist and Mariah was a Methodist. Of Scots-Irish and English ancestry, (Note: Asked when his family "dropped the 'O'" from his O'Bryan surname, he replied there had never been one.) Charles inherited his father's Democratic affiliation. Charles' cousin, William Sherman Jennings, was also a prominent Democrat. Bryan attended both the University of Chicago and Illinois College in Jacksonville, Illinois. He married Elizabeth Louise Brokaw and they had three children. Bryan worked as a tobacco broker and insurance salesman, farmed, and raised purebred livestock.

Bryan moved to Lincoln, Nebraska, in 1889 and became business manager and political secretary for his brother, William. From 1901 to 1923, he was publisher and associate editor of his brother's newspaper, The Commoner. Elected to the Lincoln City Commission in 1915 and 1921, he also served as mayor of Lincoln from 1915 to 1917, and again from 1935 to 1937. During his first term as mayor, several progressive reforms were carried out.

Bryan first ran for governor in 1916, though he lost in the primary to Keith Neville. Bryan was elected the governor of Nebraska in 1922, and served from 1923 to 1925. He was the Democratic vice presidential candidate in 1924, picked largely because of his name to serve as running mate to conservative easterner John W. Davis. The ticket was overwhelmingly defeated by Republican incumbent Calvin Coolidge and his running mate Charles G. Dawes.

He was the unsuccessful Democratic nominee for governor in 1926 and 1928. He won the 1930 and 1932 gubernatorial elections, serving as governor again from 1931 to 1935. During his tenure, the state's economy flourished, state spending was limited, and taxes were reduced. He unsuccessfully ran as a Democratic candidate for the U.S. Senate in 1934, and was elected to another term as Mayor of Lincoln in 1935. He unsuccessfully ran for governor in 1938 as an independent candidate, ran for the U.S. House in 1940, and was the Democratic nominee for governor in 1942.

Bryan died on March 4, 1945, in Lincoln, Nebraska, and is interred there at Wyuka Cemetery.

== Sources ==
- Coletta, Paolo E. (1964). William Jennings Bryan, Vol. 1: Political Evangelist, 1860–1908. University of Nebraska Press. ISBN 978-0-8032-0022-7.
- Kazin, Michael (2006). A Godly Hero: The Life of William Jennings Bryan. Knopf. ISBN 978-0-375-41135-9.

Political offices
| Preceded by Frank C. Zehrung | Mayor of Lincoln; 1915–1917 | Succeeded by John Miller |
| Preceded by Samuel McKelvie | Governor of Nebraska; 1923–1925 | Succeeded by Adam McMullen |
| Preceded by Arthur J. Weaver | Governor of Nebraska; 1931–1935 | Succeeded by Roy Cochran |
| Preceded by Fenton Fleming | Mayor of Lincoln; 1935–1937 | Succeeded by Oren S. Copeland |
Party political offices
| Preceded by John H. Morehead | Democratic nominee for Governor of Nebraska; 1922, 1924 (withdrew) | Succeeded by John N. Norton |
| Preceded by Harry C. Parmenter | Progressive nominee for Governor of Nebraska; 1924 (withdrew) | Succeeded by Dan B. Butler |
| Preceded by Franklin D. Roosevelt | Democratic nominee for Vice President of the United States; 1924 | Succeeded by Joe Robinson |
| Preceded by John N. Norton | Democratic nominee for Governor of Nebraska; 1926, 1928, 1930, 1932 | Succeeded by Roy Cochran |
| Preceded by Terry Carpenter | Democratic nominee for Governor of Nebraska; 1942 | Succeeded by George W. Olsen |
