= Adam McMullen =

American politician (1872–1959)

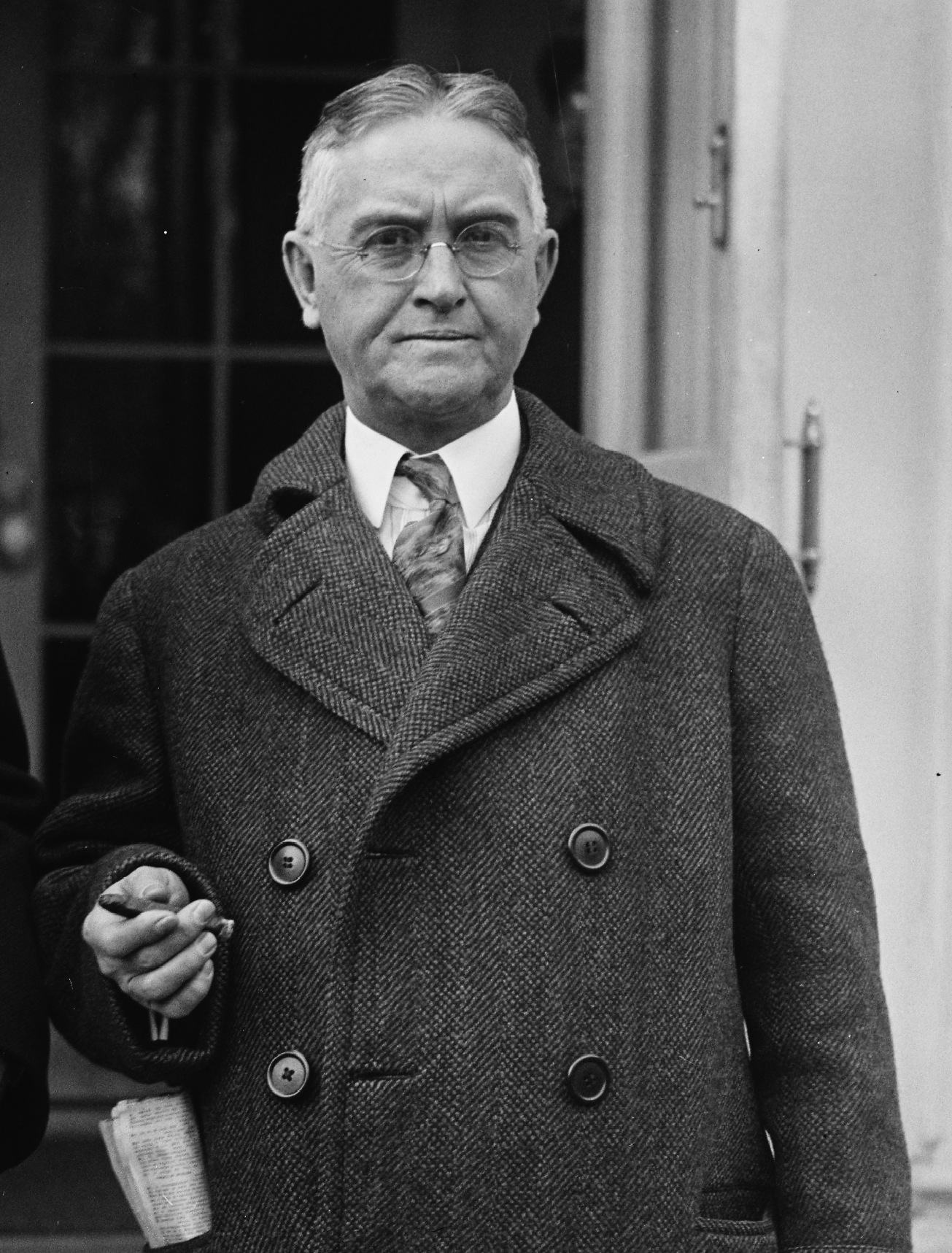

Chair of the National Governors Association
- In office July 25, 1927 – November 20, 1928
- Preceded by: Owen Brewster
- Succeeded by: George Dern

21st Governor of Nebraska
- In office January 8, 1925 – January 3, 1929
- Lieutenant: George A. Williams
- Preceded by: Charles W. Bryan
- Succeeded by: Arthur J. Weaver

Member of the Nebraska Senate
- In office 1917–1919

Member of the Nebraska House of Representatives
- In office 1905–1909

Personal details
- Born: June 12, 1872 Wellsville, New York, U.S.
- Died: March 2, 1959 (aged 86) Wymore, Nebraska, U.S.
- Resting place: Wymore Cemetery
- Party: Republican
- Spouse: Cora Greenwood (m. 1901)
- Education: University of Nebraska (BA); George Washington University (LLB)

Adam McMullen (June 12, 1872 – March 2, 1959) was an American Republican politician and was the 21st Governor of Nebraska.

== Early life ==
McMullen was born on June 12, 1872, in Wellsville, New York, to Mary (née Harbouse) and John H. McMullen. As a young boy, he moved with his family to Wymore, Nebraska. He was a founding member of the Beta Tau chapter of Delta Tau Delta fraternity at the University of Nebraska in 1894.

McMullen worked as a secretary for Nebraska Congressman Jesse Strode, then for Senator Charles Henry Dietrich. He graduated from the University of Nebraska with a Bachelor of Arts in 1896, and matriculated at George Washington University, where he earned a law degree in 1899. He was admitted to the bar in 1901.

== Career ==
McMullen returned to Nebraska and practiced law in a private practice in Wymore. He continued his law practice until 1914.

In 1904, McMullen was elected to the Nebraska House of Representatives; He was reelected to a second term in 1906. He wrote the direct primary bill. After this time, McMullen served as mayor of Wymore.

In 1916, McMullen was elected to the Nebraska State Senate and served from 1917 to 1919. From 1916 to 1920, he was also a member of the Wymore School Board, serving as president during the last two years. He was elected Governor of Nebraska for two terms, in 1924 and in 1926. In the 1928 Republican National Convention, he led a delegation of midwest governors to initiate a farm program to boost the agricultural economy of midwestern states. During his tenure, the state deficit was erased using a special tax and the state highway program was improved.

After stepping down from the governorship, McMullen settled in Beatrice, Nebraska, and continued to stay politically active while pursuing his own business interests. He served as postmaster of Beatrice from 1932 to 1936. He was also a delegate to the 1932 Republican National Convention. In 1940, he ran for the U.S. Senate, but was unsuccessful. In 1956, he attacked the Eisenhower administration and supported Adlai Stevenson II.

== Personal life ==
McMullen married Cora Greenwood, daughter of Mary (née Cavanaugh) and H. A. Greenwood, of Wymore in June 1901. He was a 32nd degree Mason at Albert Pike Lodge in Washington, D.C. He was a member and vestryman of Christ Episcopal Church. He was also a member of the Blizzard of 1888 Club. He was a member of the Masonic Lodge of Wymore, the York Rite of Beatrice, the Scottish Rite of Lincoln, Nebraska, and the Sesostris Temple of the Shrine in Lincoln. He received the KCCH degree in the York Rite from the Sovereign Grand Lodge of Washington, D.C.

McMullen died on March 2, 1959. He is interred at Wymore Cemetery.

Party political offices
Preceded by Charlie Randall	Republican nominee for Governor of Nebraska; 1924, 1926	Succeeded by Arthur J. Weaver
Political offices
Preceded by Charles W. Bryan	Governor of Nebraska; 1925–1929	Succeeded by Arthur J. Weaver
Preceded by Owen Brewster	Chair of the National Governors Association; 1927–1928	Succeeded by George Dern
