= John N. Norton =

American politician

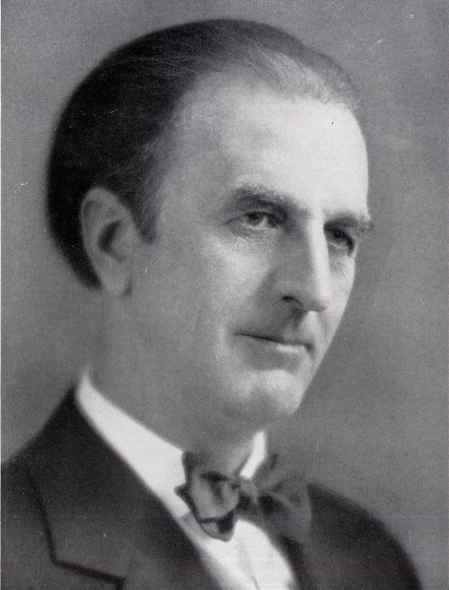
- From 1932's Nebraskana: Biographical Sketches of Nebraska Men and Women of Achievement who Have Been Awarded Life Membership in the Nebraskana Society

Member of the U.S. House of Representatives from Nebraska's 4th district
- In office March 4, 1931 – March 3, 1933
- Preceded by: Charles Henry Sloan
- Succeeded by: Ashton C. Shallenberger
- In office March 4, 1927 – March 3, 1929
- Preceded by: Melvin O. McLaughlin
- Succeeded by: Charles Henry Sloan

Member of the Nebraska Legislature from the 25th district
- In office January 5, 1937 – January 3, 1939
- Preceded by: Position created
- Succeeded by: Jay Hastings

Member of the Nebraska House of Representatives
- In office 1911-1918

Personal details
- Born: May 12, 1878 Stromsburg, Nebraska, U.S.
- Died: October 5, 1960 (aged 82) Washington, D.C., U.S.
- Party: Democratic

John Nathaniel Norton (May 12, 1878 – October 5, 1960) was an American Democratic Party politician.

== Biography ==
Born on a farm near Stromsburg, Nebraska, on May 12, 1878, Norton attended Bryant Normal University in Stromsburg. He graduated from Nebraska Wesleyan University in 1901 and the University of Nebraska in 1903. He served as clerk and recorder of Polk County, Nebraska, from 1906 to 1909, and served as mayor of Osceola, Nebraska, from 1908 to 1909. Norton moved to a farm near Polk, Nebraska, and farmed from 1910 to 1922.

He was a member of the Nebraska House of Representatives from 1911 to 1918. During this time he introduced a bill to establish a unicameral legislature; the effort failed at the time, but Norton continued to advocate for the idea for two decades until it was finally enacted. Norton was a member of the State Constitutional Convention in 1919 and 1920, and became a Chautauqua and Lyceum lecturer in 1922. He was the Democratic nominee for Governor of Nebraska in 1924, as the Democratic incumbent, Charles W. Bryan, was running for Vice President of the United States. Both Norton and Bryan lost, and Norton returned to lecturing, continuing in that line of work until 1927.

In 1926, Norton was elected as a Democrat to the Seventieth Congress (March 4, 1927 – March 3, 1929), unsuccessfully running for reelection in 1928. In 1930, he was elected to the Seventy-second Congress (March 4, 1931 – March 3, 1933). He was defeated for renomination in 1932 by fellow incumbent Ashton C. Shallenberger, when the two were thrown together in redistricting following Nebraska's loss of one U.S. House seat in reapportionment.

From June 1933 to December 1936, Norton was a representative and adviser to the Agricultural Adjustment Administration. During this time, Norton saw one of his chief political goals accomplished: in 1934 voters in Nebraska approved a constitutional amendment to take effect with the 1936 elections, abolishing the state House of Representatives and granting its powers to the state Senate, forming a unicameral legislature. (This was enacted with the help of U.S. Senator George W. Norris.) Norton was elected to the first "Unicameral" in 1936 and wrote the rules for the new governing body; he served one term in it, in 1937 and 1938.

Norton became a special adviser in the Federal Crop Insurance Corporation in Washington, D.C., where he served from 1939 to 1948.

He died in Washington, D.C., on October 5, 1960, and was buried in Swede Plain Cemetery in Polk County, Nebraska.

Norton's daughter, Evelyn Lincoln, was President John F. Kennedy's personal secretary, serving him both in the Senate and in the White House, for nearly 11 years. She was riding in the motorcade in Dallas on November 22, 1963, when Kennedy was assassinated.

Party political offices
Preceded by Charles W. Bryan	Democratic nominee for Governor of Nebraska; 1924	Succeeded by Charles W. Bryan
U.S. House of Representatives
Preceded by Melvin O. McLaughlin (R)	Member of the U.S. House of Representatives from Nebraska's 4th congressional district March 4, 1927 – March 3, 1929	Succeeded by Charles Henry Sloan (R)
Preceded by Charles Henry Sloan (R)	Member of the U.S. House of Representatives from Nebraska's 4th congressional district March 4, 1931 – March 3, 1933	Succeeded by Ashton C. Shallenberger (D)
