= Polk, Nebraska =

Village in Polk County, Nebraska, United States

- Village
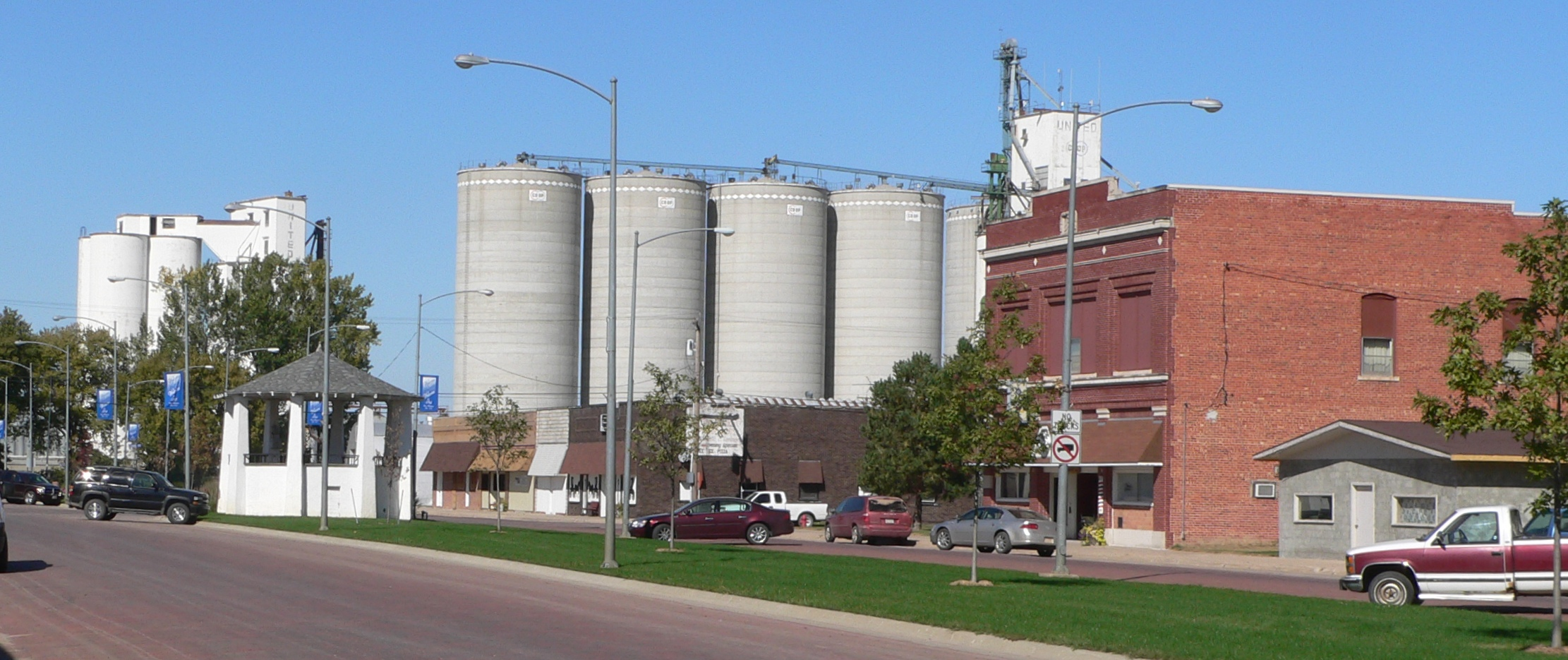
- Downtown Polk

- Location of Polk, Nebraska
- Coordinates: 41°04′32″N 97°47′01″W
- Country: United States
- State: Nebraska
- County: Polk

Area
  - Total: 0.49 sq mi (1.27 km^{2})
  - Land: 0.49 sq mi (1.27 km^{2})
  - Water: 0 sq mi (0.00 km^{2})
- Elevation: 1,742 ft (531 m)

Population (2020)
  - Total: 346
  - Density: 707.0/sq mi (272.99/km^{2})
- Time zone: UTC-6 (Central (CST))
  - Summer (DST): UTC-5 (CDT)
- ZIP code: 68654
- Area code: 402
- FIPS code: 31-39660
- GNIS feature ID: 2398994

Polk is a village in Polk County, Nebraska, United States. The population was 346 at the 2020 census.

== History ==
Polk was platted in 1906 when the railroad was extended to that point.

== Geography ==
According to the United States Census Bureau, the village has a total area of 0.49 square miles (1.27 km^{2}), all land.

== Demographics ==
Historical population
Census	Pop.	Note	%±
1910	396		—
1920	561		41.7%
1930	532		−5.2%
1940	493		−7.3%
1950	508		3.0%
1960	433		−14.8%
1970	413		−4.6%
1980	440		6.5%
1990	345		−21.6%
2000	322		−6.7%
2010	322		0.0%
2020	346		7.5%
U.S. Decennial Census

=== 2010 census ===
At the 2010 census, there were 322 people, 152 households and 91 families residing in the village. The population density was 657.1 per square mile (253.7/km^{2}). There were 180 housing units at an average density of 367.3 per square mile (141.8/km^{2}). The racial makeup of the village was 98.4% White, 0.3% Native American, 0.3% Asian, 0.6% from other races, and 0.3% from two or more races. Hispanic or Latino of any race were 2.2% of the population.

There were 152 households, of which 21.7% had children under the age of 18 living with them, 51.3% were married couples living together, 5.3% had a female householder with no husband present, 3.3% had a male householder with no wife present, and 40.1% were non-families. 38.2% of all households were made up of individuals, and 21.7% had someone living alone who was 65 years of age or older. The average household size was 2.12 and the average family size was 2.78.

The median age was 49 years. 19.9% of residents were under the age of 18; 4.1% were between the ages of 18 and 24; 20.8% were from 25 to 44; 32.9% were from 45 to 64; and 22.4% were 65 years of age or older. The gender makeup of the village was 48.1% male and 51.9% female.

=== 2000 census ===
At the 2000 census, there were 322 people, 152 households and 86 families residing in the village. The population density was 658.4 inhabitants per square mile (254.2/km^{2}). There were 190 housing units at an average density of 388.5 per square mile (150.0/km^{2}). The racial makeup of the village was 100.00% White. Hispanic or Latino of any race were 0.62% of the population.

There were 152 households, of which 21.1% had children under the age of 18 living with them, 51.3% were married couples living together, 4.6% had a female householder with no husband present, and 42.8% were non-families. 40.1% of all households were made up of individuals, and 26.3% had someone living alone who was 65 years of age or older. The average household size was 2.12 and the average family size was 2.86.

19.9% of the population were under the age of 18, 4.7% from 18 to 24, 21.7% from 25 to 44, 20.8% from 45 to 64, and 32.9% who were 65 years of age or older. The median age was 47 years. For every 100 females, there were 96.3 males. For every 100 females age 18 and over, there were 89.7 males.

The median household income was $28,056 and the median family income was $38,472. Males had a median income of $26,389 and females $18,500. The per capita income was $15,670. About 4.4% of families and 5.4% of the population were below the poverty line, including 6.2% of those under age 18 and 8.4% of those age 65 or over.

== Notable people ==
- John N. Norton, state politician
- James Wilson, long-distance motorcyclist and author in the 1920s and 30s

== See also ==
- List of municipalities in Nebraska
