= List of University of Nebraska–Lincoln people =

This list of University of Nebraska–Lincoln people includes notable graduates, instructors, and administrators affiliated with University of Nebraska–Lincoln. Three Nobel Prize winners have been associated with the university.

== Nobel laureates ==
Name	Class year	Notability	Reference(s)
George Beadle (1903–89)	B.S. 1926; M. S. 1927	Scientist, 1958 Nobel Prize in Physiology or Medicine winner, 7th President of University of Chicago	
Donald J. Cram (1919–2001)	M. S. 1942	Chemist, 1987 Nobel Prize in Chemistry winner	
Alan J. Heeger (b. 1936)	B.S. 1957; honorary Ph.D. 1999	Chemist, 2000 Nobel Prize for Chemistry winner	

== Pulitzer Prize winners ==
Name	Class year	Notability	Reference(s)
Karen Blessen (b. 1951)	B. F. A. 1973	Graphic artist, 1989 Pulitzer Prize winner	
Willa Cather (1873–1947)	B.A. 1895	Writer, 1923 Pulitzer Prize winner	
Ted Kooser (b. 1939)	M. A. 1968	Poet, 13th United States Poet Laureate, 2005 Pulitzer Prize winner	
Marjie Lundstrom (b. 1956)	B.A. 1978	Journalist, 1991 Pulitzer Prize winner	
Karl Shapiro (1913–2000)	Professor	Poet, 5th United States Poet Laureate, 1945 Pulitzer Prize winner	

== Academics ==
=== College founders, presidents, and deans ===
Name	Class year	Notability	Reference(s)
Edith Abbott (1876–1957)	B.S. 1901	Economist, social worker, founder of University of Chicago School of Social Service Administration	
Gene Budig (1939–2020)	B.A. 1962; M. A. 1963; Ph.D. 1967	Baseball executive, academic administrator (Kansas, Illinois State, West Virginia)	
Edward C. Elliott (1874–1960)	B.S. 1895; M. A. 1897	Academic administrator (Montana, Purdue)	
Miguel Angel Escotet	Ph.D. 1972	Social scientist, academic administrator (Texas at Brownsville)	
Ronnie D. Green (b. 1961)	Ph.D. 1988	Academic administrator (Nebraska)	
John Jasinski (b. 1962)	Ph.D. 1996	Academic administrator (Northwest Missouri State)	
Alvin Saunders Johnson (1874–1971)	M. A. 1898	Economist, founder of The New School	
Charles L. Littel (c. 1886–1966)	B.A. 1912	Founder and president of Junior College of Bergen County and Centralia Junior College	
James Milliken (b. 1957)	B.A. 1979	Academic administrator (Nebraska, Texas)	
Roscoe Pound (1870–1964)	B.A. 1888; M. A. 1889; Ph.D. 1897	Legal scholar and educator, dean of law (Nebraska, Harvard)	
William Ruud (b. 1952)	B.A.; Ph.D.	Academic administrator (Northern Iowa, Shippensburg, Marietta)	

=== Professors and scholars ===
Name	Class year	Notability	Reference(s)
Robert A. Alberty (1921–2014)	B.S. 1943; M. S. 1944	Biophysical chemist	
Hartley Burr Alexander (1873–1939)	B.A. 1896	Philosopher, writer, iconographer; wrote symbolism and inscriptions in the Nebraska State Capitol	
George Andreasen (1934–1989)	B.S.; M. S.	Orthodontist, inventor of the Nitinol wire	
Sachio Ashida (1924–2009)	Ph.D. 1963	Experimental psychologist, judoka, and kamikaze pilot; professor of psychology at the State University of New York at Brockport	
George Willis Botsford (1862–1917)	B.A. 1884; M. A. 1889	Greek and Roman classicist	
Rosa Bouton (1860–1951)	B.S. 1891; M. A. 1893	Chemist	
Norma Elia Cantú (b. 1947)	Ph.D. 1982	Writer	
Edwin H. Colbert (1905–2001)	B.A.	Vertebrate paleontologist, author	
Nancy Coover Andreasen (b. 1938)	B.A.	Neuroscientist, neurophysicist	
Donald Cox (b. 1937)	B.S. 1959; M. S. 1960	Electrical engineer	
Frank W. Cyr (1900–1995)	B.A. 1923	Rural education researcher, "father of the yellow school bus"	
Harold Eugene Edgerton (1903–90)	B.S. 1925	Electrical engineer, stroboscope pioneer, photographer	
Loren Eiseley (1907–77)	B.A. 1933; B.S. 1933	Anthropologist, philosopher, writer	
Rollins A. Emerson (1873–1947)	B.S. 1897	Geneticist	
Mohammad Kabir Hassan (b. 1963)	M. A. 1987; Ph.D. 1990	Economist	
Jay Keasling	B.S. 1986	Synthetic biologist	
Derrick Norman Lehmer (1867–1938)	B.A. 1893; M. A. 1896	Number theorist	
John L. Loos (1918–2011)	B.A. 1939; M. A. 1940	Lewis and Clark historian	
John Norman (b. 1931)	B.A. 1953	Author, philosopher	
Dirk Obbink (b. 1957)	B.A. 1978	Papyrologist, classicist	
Loreen Olson	Ph.D.	Professor of Communications at UNC Greensboro	
Londa Schiebinger (b. 1952)	B.A. 1974	Researcher	
Bernice Slote (1913–1983)	M. A. 1941	Editor of Prairie Schooner, poet	
Don Welch (1932–2016)	Ph.D. 1966	Poet, professor of English literature at University of Nebraska at Kearney	

== Arts, design and entertainment ==
Name	Class year	Notability	Reference(s)
Ronald Barnes (1927–97)	B. M. 1950	Carillonist	
Robert Beerbohm (b. 1952)	B.A. 1972	Comic book historian	
Benjamin A. Botkin (1901–75)	Ph.D. 1931	Folklorist	
Kirk Bovill (b. 1961)	B.S. 1984	Actor, writer, producer	
Dan Brown (b. 1990)	Did not graduate	Blogger and YouTube personality, founder of Pogopalooza	
Johnny Carson (1925–2005)	B.A. 1949	Host of The Tonight Show Starring Johnny Carson; seven-time Emmy winner; Presidential Medal of Freedom recipient; Kennedy Center Honors Lifetime Achievement Award recipient	
Bruce Conner (1933–2008)	B. F. A. 1956	Artist	
Aaron Douglas (1899–1979)	B.A. 1922	Painter, illustrator and visual arts educator; "the father of African-American art"	
Jeff Draheim (b. 1963)	B.A. 1985	Film editor	
Alice Righter Edmiston (1874–1964)		Artist	
Norman Ericson (1932–2011)	B.A. 1954	Biblical scholar	
Charles L. Fletcher (b. 1971)	B.A. 1996	Architect and interior designer	
Barbara Hendricks (b. 1948)	B.A. 1969	Opera, recital, and jazz singer; Goodwill ambassador for the United Nations High Commissioner for Refugees	
Ruth Rosekrans Hoffman (1926–2007)	B. F. A. 1948	Artist and children's book illustrator	
Ray Howlett (b. 1940)	B.A. 1963	Artist	
Weldon Kees (1914–55)	B.A. 1935	Poet, abstract expressionist, jazz pianist, composer, photographer, and filmmaker	
Jaime King (b. 1979)	Did not graduate	Actress, model	
Stephanie Kurtzuba (b. 1972)	Did not graduate	Actress	
Thomas D. Mangelsen (b. 1946)	B.S. 1967	Wildlife photographer, conservationist	
Clare Cooper Marcus (b. 1934)	B.A. 1952	Landscape architecture educator	
Charles F. McAfee	B.Arch 1958	Architect, housing activist	
Sarah Wool Moore (1846–1911)		Artist and art teacher	
Chad Myers	B.A. 1985	Meteorologist	
Conor Oberst (b. 1980)	Did not graduate	Lead vocalist of Bright Eyes	
Bryan Odell (b. 1990)	Did not graduate	Music journalist, YouTube personality	
Joel Sartore (b. 1962)	B.A. 1985	National Geographic photographer	
Dan Schlissel (b. 1970)	B.S. 1993	Record producer; founder of Stand Up! Records and -ismist Recordings	
Shelley Smith (b. 1958)	B.A. 1981	SportsCenter correspondent	
James Valentine (b. 1978)	B.A. 2004	Lead guitarist of Maroon 5	
Dan Whitney (b. 1963)	Did not graduate	Comedian (stage name "Larry the Cable Guy")	
Jeff Zeleny (b. 1973)	B.A. 1996	CNN senior White House correspondent	
Golden J. Zenon Jr. (1929–2006)	B.Arch 1955	Architect	

== Business ==
Name	Class year	Notability	Reference(s)
Warren Buffett (b. 1930)	B.S. 1950	Investor, philanthropist; chairman and CEO of Berkshire Hathaway	
Jack Cole (1920–2007)	B.S./B.A.	Entrepreneur, inventor of the reverse telephone directory	
Harry Culver (1880–1946)	Did not graduate	Real estate agent; founder of Culver City, California	
William E. Galbraith (1926–2012)	B.S. 1949	National Commander of the American Legion	
Vinod Gupta (b. 1946)	M. S. 1969; M. B.A. 1971	Investor, philanthropist; founder of infoGROUP and Vinod Gupta School of Management	
Mohammad Kabir Hassan (b. 1963)	M. S. 1987; Ph.D. 1990	Economist	
C. Edward McVaney (1940–2020)	B.S.	Founder and CEO of JD Edwards	

== Law and politics ==
=== Heads of state ===
Name	Class year	Notability	Reference(s)
Kārlis Ulmanis (1877–1942)	B.S. 1909	1st prime minister of Latvia, 4th president of Latvia	

=== United States cabinet secretaries and leaders ===
Name	Class year	Notability	Reference(s)
James Abdnor (1923–2012)	B.S. 1945	15th administrator of the Small Business Administration, senator from South Dakota, representative from South Dakota, 30th lieutenant governor of South Dakota	
Claude M. Bolton Jr. (1945–2015)	B.S. 1969; honorary Ph.D. 2007	Air Force major general, 3rd assistant secretary of the Army for Acquisition, Logistics, and Technology	
Herbert Brownell Jr. (1904–96)	B.A. 1924	Lawyer, 62nd attorney general	
G. Bradford Cook (1937–2014)	Law 1961	18th chairman of the Securities and Exchange Commission	
Hal Daub (b. 1941)	J. D. 1966	Chairman of the Social Security Advisory Board, representative from Nebraska, 48th mayor of Omaha, Nebraska	
Stanley K. Hathaway (1924–2005)	Law 1950	40th secretary of the interior, 27th governor of Wyoming	
Richard Lee McCall Jr. (b. 1942)	Did not graduate	14th assistant secretary of state for International Organization Affairs	
John R. McCarl (1879–1940)	B.S. 1903	1st comptroller general	
Jan Meyers (1928–2019)	B.A. 1951	10th chair of the House Committee on Small Business, representative from Kansas	
Patsy Mink (1927–2002)	Did not graduate	3rd assistant secretary of state for Oceans and International Environmental and Scientific Affairs, representative from Hawaii	
Norbert Tiemann (1924–2012)	B.S. 1949	13th administrator of the Federal Highway Administration, 32nd governor of Nebraska	
Clayton Yeutter (1930–2017)	B.S. 1952; J. D. 1963; Ph.D. 1966	23rd secretary of agriculture, 9th trade representative	

=== Governors ===
Name	Class year	Notability	Reference(s)
Victor Anderson (1902–62)		28th governor of Nebraska, mayor of Lincoln	
Ralph G. Brooks (1898–1960)	Law 1926	29th governor of Nebraska, 19th chair of the National Governors Association	
Robert Leroy Cochran (1886–1963)	B.S. 1910	24th governor of Nebraska	
Jonathan M. Davis (1871–1943)	Did not graduate	22nd governor of Kansas	
Dwight Griswold (1893–1954)	B.A. 1914	25th governor of Nebraska, senator from Nebraska	
Elmer Holt (1884–1945)	1902	10th governor of Montana	
Bob Kerrey (b. 1943)	B.S. 1966	35th governor of Nebraska, senator from Nebraska; Medal of Honor, Bronze Star Medal, and Purple Heart recipient	
Samuel Roy McKelvie (1881–1956)	Did not graduate	19th governor of Nebraska, 13th lieutenant governor of Nebraska	
Adam McMullen (1872–1959)	1896	21st governor of Nebraska, 12th chair of the National Governors Association	
Frank B. Morrison (1905–2004)	Law 1931	31st governor of Nebraska	
Ben Nelson (b. 1941)	B.A. 1963; M. A. 1965; J. D. 1970	37th governor of Nebraska, senator from Nebraska	
Val Peterson (1903–83)	M.A. 1931	26th governor of Nebraska, 4th ambassador to Denmark, 16th ambassador to Finland	
George L. Sheldon (1870–1960)	1892	14th governor of Nebraska	
Charles Thone (1924–2018)	Law 1950	34th governor of Nebraska, representative from Nebraska	
Arthur J. Weaver (1873–1945)	Law 1896	22nd governor of Nebraska	
Toryalai Wesa (b. 1949)	M. S. 1977	8th governor of Kandahar (Afghanistan)	

=== United States senators ===
Name	Class year	Notability	Reference(s)
Hazel Abel (1888–1966)	B.A. 1908	Senator from Nebraska	
Elmer Burkett (1867–1935)	Law 1893	Senator from Nebraska, representative from Nebraska	
Deb Fischer (b. 1951)	B.S. 1987	Senator from Nebraska	
Richard C. Hunter (1884–1941)	B.A. 1909	Senator from Nebraska, 22nd Nebraska attorney general	
David Karnes (1948–2020)	B.S. 1971	Senator from Nebraska	
Kenneth S. Wherry (1892–1951)	B.A. 1914	7th Senate minority leader, senator from Nebraska	

=== United States representatives ===
Name	Class year	Notability	Reference(s)
Doug Bereuter (b. 1939)	B.A. 1961	Representative from Nebraska	
Lawrence Brock (1906–68)	B.S. 1929	Representative from Nebraska	
Howard Buffett (1903–1964)	B.S. 1925	Representative from Nebraska, father of Warren Buffett	
Chris Carney (b. 1959)	Ph.D. 1993	Representative from Pennsylvania, Navy commander	
Jackson B. Chase (1890–1974)	LL. B. 1912	Representative from Nebraska	
Marian W. Clarke (1880–1953)	Did not graduate	Representative from New York	
Harry B. Coffee (1890–1972)	1913	Representative from Nebraska	
Oren S. Copeland (1887–1958)	B.A. 1907	Representative from Nebraska	
George E. Danielson (1915–98)	B.A. 1937; J. D. 1939	Representative from California	
Robert Dinsmore Harrison (1897–1977)	Ph.D. 1934	Representative from Nebraska	
George H. Heinke (1882–1940)	Law 1908	Representative from Nebraska	
Fred Gustus Johnson (1876–1951)	Law 1903	Representative from Nebraska, 17th lieutenant governor of Nebraska	
Walter Judd (1898–1994)	M. D. 1923	Representative from Minnesota	
Thomas F. Konop (1879–1964)	Law 1904	Representative from Wisconsin	
John Henry Kyl (1919–2002)	B.A. 1947	Representative from Iowa	
Henry Carl Luckey (1868–1956)	Law 1912	Representative from Nebraska	
John A. Maguire (1870–1939)	Law 1899	Representative from Nebraska	
Charles F. McLaughlin (1887–1976)	B.A. 1908	Representative from Nebraska, federal judge of the District Court for the District of Columbia	
David Henry Mercer (1857–1919)	B.S. 1880	Representative from Nebraska	
Howard Shultz Miller (1879–1970)	Law 1900	Representative from Kentucky	
John N. Norton (1878–1960)	B.S. 1903	Representative from Nebraska	
Ernest M. Pollard (1869–1939)	B.S. 1893	Representative from Nebraska	
Robert G. Simmons (1891–1969)	Law 1915	Representative from Nebraska, 23rd chief justice of Nebraska	
Adrian Smith (b. 1970)	B.S. 1993	Representative from Nebraska	
Virginia D. Smith (1911–2006)	B.S. 1936	Representative from Nebraska	
John Hyde Sweet (1880–1964)	B.A. 1899	Representative from Nebraska	
Lee Terry (b. 1962)	B.A. 1984	Representative from Nebraska	
Phillip Hart Weaver (1919–89)	B.A. 1940	Representative from Nebraska	

=== Federal judges ===
Name	Class year	Notability	Reference(s)
C. Arlen Beam (b. 1930)	B.S. 1951; J. D. 1965	Federal judge of the Court of Appeals for the Eighth Circuit, district judge of the District Court for the District of Nebraska	
John Robert Brown (1909–1993)	B.A. 1930	Federal judge of the Court of Appeals for the Fifth Circuit	
L. Steven Grasz (b. 1961)	B.S. 1984; J. D. 1989	Federal judge of the Court of Appeals for the Eighth Circuit	
Harvey M. Johnsen (1895–1975)	LL. B. 1919; B.A. 1921	Federal judge of the Court of Appeals for the Eighth Circuit	
John Coleman Pickett (1896–1983)	LL. B. 1922	Federal judge of the Court of Appeals for the Tenth Circuit	
William J. Riley (b. 1947)	B.A. 1969; J. D. 1972	Federal judge of the Court of Appeals for the Eighth Circuit	
Donald Roe Ross (1922–2013)	J. D. 1948	Federal judge of the Court of Appeals for the Eighth Circuit	

=== Nebraska representatives ===
Name	Class year	Notability	Reference(s)
John Adams Jr. (1906–99)	B.S. 1927; Law 1929	Member of Nebraska Legislature, Army captain and judge advocate	
Roy Baker (b. 1945)	B.S. 1967; M. Ed. 1970; Ed. D. 1977	Member of Nebraska Legislature	
Tom Baker (b. 1948)	B.S. 1971	Member of Nebraska Legislature	
Chris Beutler (b. 1944)	Law 1973	Member of Nebraska Legislature, 51st mayor of Lincoln	
Ardyce Bohlke (1943–2013)	1965	Member of Nebraska Legislature, speech pathologist	
Tom Brandt (b. 1959)	B.S. 1982	Member of Nebraska Legislature	
Lydia Brasch (b. 1953)	B.A. 1989	Member of Nebraska Legislature	
Kermit Brashear (b. 1944)	B.A. 1966; J. D. 1969	Speaker of Nebraska Legislature	
Jon Bruning (b. 1969)	B.A. 1990; J. D. 1994	Member of Nebraska Legislature, 32nd Nebraska attorney general	

=== Nebraska judges ===
Name	Class year	Notability	Reference(s)
David K. Arterburn (b. 1957)	B.A. 1978; M. A. 1982; J. D. 1985	Judge of the Nebraska Court of Appeals	
Riko E. Bishop (b. 1956)	J. D. 1992	Judge of the Nebraska Court of Appeals	
William G. Cambridge (1931–2004)	B.S. 1953; J. D. 1955	District judge of the District Court for the District of Nebraska	
Laurie Smith Camp (1953–2020)	J. D. 1977	District judge of the District Court for the District of Nebraska	
Kristine Cecava	Law 1976	District judge of the District Court for the District of Nebraska	
E. B. Chappell (1889–1968)	B.A. 1916; LL. B. 1916	Justice of the Nebraska Supreme Court	
Richard G. Kopf (b. 1946)	J. D. 1972	District judge of the District Court for the District of Nebraska	
Robert Van Pelt (1897–1988)	LL. B. 1922	District judge of the District Court for the District of Nebraska	

=== Other political figures ===
Name	Class year	Notability	Reference(s)
Grace Abbott (1878–1939)	B.A. 1907	Social worker, immigrants' rights and child welfare advocate	
Nasser al-Awlaki (1946–2021)	Ph.D. 1975	Yemeni scholar and politician	
Emory Buckner (1877–1941)	B.A. 1904	34th Attorney for the Southern District of New York	
Mary Ann Hanusa (b. 1963)	M. A.	Director of the White House Office of Presidential Correspondence	
Helen Klanderud (1937–2013)	J. D. 1991	Mayor of Aspen	
Karen Muenster (b. 1942)		Democratic minority whip in the South Dakota Senate	
Ted Muenster	B.S. 1962, M.A.	Democratic nominee in the 1990 United States Senate election in South Dakota, chief of staff to South Dakota Governor Richard F. Kneip	
MK Pritzker (b. 1967)	B.A.	First Lady of Illinois	
Mark Quandahl (b. 1961)	Law 1987	Attorney, director of Nebraska Department of Banking and Finance, chairman of the Nebraska Republican Party	
J. Lee Rankin (1907–96)	LL. B. 1930	31st solicitor general, general counsel to the Warren Commission	
Ted Sorensen (1928–2010)	J. D. 1951	8th White House counsel, special counsel and speechwriter for John F. Kennedy	
Park Yong-man (1881–1928)	B.S. 1909	Korean independence activist	

== Military ==
Name	Class year	Notability	Reference(s)
Donald O. Aldridge (b. 1932)	B.S.	Air Force lieutenant general	
Gary D. Brown (b. 1951)	J. D. 1987	Air Force colonel, Guantanamo Bay whistleblower	
Lloyd M. Bucher (1927–2004)	B.S. 1953	Captain of the USS Pueblo	
Duane H. Cassidy (1933–2016)	B.S. 1968	Air Force general, commander of Military Airlift Command and Transportation Command	
Bruce P. Crandall (b. 1933)	B.A. 1969	Army colonel, helicopter pilot, Medal of Honor recipient	
John Cusick (b. 1942)	M. A. 1971	42nd quartermaster general of the Army	
Galen B. Jackman (b. 1951)	B.A. 1973	Army major general	
Theodore Kanamine (1929–2023)	Bachelor's degree; law degree 1954	Brigadier general, first general officer of Japanese-American descent	
Herman F. Kramer (1892–1964)	B.S. 1914	Army major general	
Ben Kuroki (1917–2015)	B.A. 1950	Only Japanese American in the Army Air Forces to serve in combat in the Pacific theater of World War II	
Michael D. Navrkal	B.S. 1984	Army National Guard brigadier general, Legion of Merit recipient	
John J. Pershing (1860–1948)	LL. B. 1893	1st general of the Armies, commander of the American Expeditionary Force, recipient of the Order of the Bath, Legion of Honour, Order of the Companions of Honour, and 1932 Pulitzer Prize	
James C. Riley (b. 1946)	B.S. 1971	US Army lieutenant general	
Sidney Shachnow (1934–2018)	B.S.	Army major general, two-time Silver Star recipient, Holocaust survivor	
Robert T. Smith (1918–95)	Did not graduate	World War II ace	

== Literature ==
Name	Class year	Notability	Reference(s)
Barbara Albright (1955–2006)	B.S.	Cookbook author	
Bruce B. Brugmann (b. 1935)	B.A. 1957	Founder and editor of the San Francisco Bay Guardian	
Eudora Bumstead (1860–92)	B.A. 1879	Poet, hymnwriter	
Roxane Gay (b. 1974)	M. A. 2004	Writer, editor	
Claire Jiménez	Ph.D. 2022	Novelist of What Happened to Ruthy Ramirez	
Catherine Kidwell (1921–2002)	M. F. A. 1977	Novelist	
Mary Pipher (b. 1947)	Ph.D. 1977	Clinical psychologist and author	
Gayathri Prabhu (b. 1974)	Ph.D. 2011	Novelist	
Mari Sandoz (1896–1966)	Did not graduate	Novelist, biographer, Newbery Medal recipient	
Jim Thompson (1906–1977)	Did not graduate	Author, screenwriter	

== Science and technology ==
Name	Class year	Notability	Reference(s)
Bion J. Arnold (1861–1942)	M. S. 1897	Engineer, designer of the Interborough Rapid Transit system; "father of the third rail"	
Henry Beachell (1906–2006)	B.S. 1930	Rice breeder, recipient of the 1987 Japan Prize and 1996 World Food Prize	
Rolla Kent Beattie (1875–1960)	B.S. 1896; M. A. 1898	Botanist, plant pathologist	
Margaret B. Fuller Boos (1892–1978)	Did not graduate	Pegmatite geologist, mapped Front Range urban corridor	
Kay Brummond (b. 1962)	B.S. 1985	Synthetic chemist	
Raychelle Burks (b. 1975)	Ph.D.	Analytical chemist	
Montgomery Case (1882–1953)	Did not graduate	Civil engineer, designer of the George Washington Bridge	
John Leland Champe (1895–1978)	B.A. 1921	Archaeologist	
Frederic Clements (1874–1945)	B.S. 1894; M. A. 1896; Ph.D. 1898	Plant ecologist	
Gladys Dick (1881–1963)	B.S. 1900	Co-inventor of scarlet fever vaccine	
Jay Wright Forrester (1918–2016)	B.S. 1939	Computer engineer, systems scientist, inventor of magnetic-core memory	
Gene V. Glass (b. 1940)	B.A./B.S. 1962	Statistician, inventor of meta-analysis	
Richard Hamming (1915–98)	M. A. 1939	Mathematician, founder of Association for Computing Machinery, Turing Award recipient	
Leta Stetter Hollingworth (1886–1939)	B.A. 1906	Psychologist	
Brian A. Larkins (1946–2025)	B.S. 1969, PhD. 1974	Molecular biologist	
William A. Mueller (1901–92)	B.S. 1922	Sound engineer, head of Warner Bros. sound department, two-time Academy Awards nominee	
Donald Othmer (1904–95)	B.S. 1924	Inventor, philanthropist	
Anne Plant	M. S. 1978	Biochemist	
Charles H. Purcell (1883–1951)	B.S. 1906	Civil engineer, designer and engineer of the Bay Bridge	
Christina Riesselman (b. 1977)	B.S. 2001	Paleoceanographer	
Per Axel Rydberg (1860–1931)	B.S. 1891; M. A. 1895	Botanist, 1st curator of the New York Botanical Garden	
Joel Stebbins (1878–1966)	B.S. 1899	Astronomer	
Gerry Thomas (1922–2005)	B.A. 1948	Inventor of the TV dinner	
Herbert John Webber (1865–1946)	B.S. 1889; M. A. 1990	Plant physiologist	
Gerald Weinberg (1933–2018)	B.S. 1955	Computer scientist, author	
Evan Williams (b. 1972)	Did not graduate	Co-founder of Twitter	

== Athletics ==
=== Baseball ===
Name	Class year	Notability	Reference(s)
Darin Erstad (b. 1974)	B.S. 2020	MLB outfielder; college baseball manager	
Bill Kinnamon (1919–2011)	B.S. 1941	MLB umpire	

=== Basketball ===
Name	Class year	Notability	Reference(s)
Tyronn Lue (b. 1977)	Did not graduate	NBA point guard and head coach	
Terran Petteway (b. 1992)		basketball player in the Israeli Basketball Premier League	

=== Football ===
Name	Class year	Notability	Reference(s)
Ben Beck (1889–1968)	B.S.	College football coach, college basketball coach	
Clete Blakeman (b. 1964)	B.S. 1988; Law 1991	NFL referee, lawyer	
Earl W. Brannon (1889–1952)	1913	College football coach	
Guy Chamberlin (1894–1967)	B.S. 1916	NFL head coach, Pro Football Hall of Fame; College Football Hall of Fame	
Will Compton (b. 1989)	B.A. 2011	NFL linebacker; Media influencer	
Scott Frost (b. 1975)	B.S. 1997	NFL safety; college football quarterback and head coach	
Turner Gill (b. 1962)	Did not graduate	College football quarterback and head coach	
Tom Osborne (b. 1937)	M. A. 1963; Ph.D. 1965	College football head coach (Nebraska 1973–97), College Football Hall of Fame; representative from Nebraska; Nebraska athletic director	
Frank Solich (b. 1944)	B.A. 1966; M. A. 1972	College football fullback and head coach (Nebraska 1998–2003)	
Zac Taylor (b. 1962)	B.S. 2006	NFL head coach	
Pat Tyrance (b. 1968)	B.S. 1990	College football linebacker, orthopedic surgeon	

=== Other sports ===
Name	Class year	Notability	Reference(s)
Therese Alshammar (b. 1977)	B.A. 1999	Swimmer, three-time Olympic medalist	
Gary Anderson (b. 1939)	Did not graduate	Sport shooter, two-time Olympic gold medalist, member of Nebraska Legislature	
Daniel Brand (1935–2015)	1958	Greco-Roman wrestler, 1964 Olympics bronze medalist	
Jordan Burroughs (b. 1988)	B.A. 2011	Freestyle wrestler, 2012 Olympics gold medalist; two-time national champion	
Dani Busboom Kelly (b. 1985)	B.A. 2007	Cornhuskers volleyball player (2003–2006), later assistant coach (2012–2016) and current head coach (2025–present)	
Taylor Edwards		Professional softball player	
Rulon Gardner (b. 1971)	B.A. 1993	Greco-Roman wrestler, two-time Olympic medalist	
Jessie Graff (b. 1984)	B.A. 2007	Stunt performer, American Ninja Warrior competitor	
Penelope Heyns (b. 1974)	B.A. 1996	Swimmer, three-time Olympic medalist	
Jason High (b. 1981)	B.A. 2004	Mixed martial artist	
Jordan Larson (b. 1986)	B.A. 2008	Indoor volleyball player, four-time Olympic medalist	
Matt Lindland (b. 1970)	Did not graduate	Mixed martial artist, 2000 Olympics silver medalist	
Priscilla Lopes-Schliep (b. 1982)	B.S. 2004	Hurdler, 2008 Olympics bronze medalist	
Merlene Ottey (b. 1960)	B.A. 1984	Sprinter, nine-time Olympic medalist	
Sarah Pavan (b. 1986)	B.S. 2008	Volleyball player; 2006 AVCA Player of the Year	
Louise Pound (1872–1958)	B. B. 1892; M. A. 1895	Folklorist, linguist, tennis player	
Russ Rose (b. 1953)	M. S. 1978	Volleyball coach, AVCA Hall of Fame	
Ryan Schultz (b. 1977)	B.S.	Mixed martial artist	
Curtis Tomasevicz (b. 1980)	B.S. 2003; M. S. 2006; Ph.D. 2017	Bobsledder, two-time Olympic medalist	
Brad Vering (b. 1977)	B.S. 2001	Greco-Roman wrestler	
Frederick Wedge (1880–1953)	Did not graduate	Boxer, clergyman	
Justine Wong-Orantes (b. 1995)	B.S. 2016	Indoor volleyball player, 2020 Olympics gold medalist	

== Faculty ==
Name	Class year	Notability	Reference(s)
Charles Edwin Bessey (1845–1915)	Chancellor, dean	Botanist, inventor of the Bessey system	
Dana X. Bible (1891–1980)	Football coach, athletic director	Two-time national champion, College Football Hall of Fame	
Hank M. Bounds (b. 1967)	President	Academic administrator	
Bill Callahan (b. 1956)	Football coach	NFL head coach, 2002 AFC champion	
John Cook (b. 1956)	Volleyball coach	Four-time national champion, AVCA Hall of Fame	
Bob Devaney (1915–97)	Football coach, athletic director	Two-time national champion, College Football Hall of Fame	
August Hjalmar Edgren (1840–1903)	Professor, honorary doctorate 1902	Linguist	
Edmund Burke Fairfield (1821–1904)	Chancellor	Minister, 12th lieutenant governor of Michigan	
Rachel Lloyd (1839–1900)	Chemistry Department head	First American woman to receive a Ph.D. in chemistry; noted for her work on the chemistry and agriculture of sugar beets	
August Luebs (1889–1989)	Professor	Mechanical engineer	
Bo Pelini (b. 1967)	Football coach	College football head coach	
Terry Pettit (b. 1946)	Volleyball coach	1995 national champion, AVCA Hall of Fame	
Laura Poppo (b. 1962)	Department chair	Researcher	
Benjamin Rader (1935–2026)	Professor	James L. Sellers Professor of History at the university	
Mike Riley (b. 1953)	Football coach	NFL head coach; two-time Grey Cup champion	
Fielding H. Yost (1871–1946)	Football coach	Six-time national champion, College Football Hall of Fame	
