= Nebraska Legislature 45th district =

American legislative district

Nebraska's 45th legislative district
- Map of Nebraska Legislature districts with the 45th district shaded in red
Senator
Rita Sanders; R–Bellevue
since 2021
- Demographics: 72.2% White; 6.3% Black; 14.8% Hispanic; 2.7% Asian; 0.8% Native American
- Population (2020): 39,331

The Nebraska Legislature's 45th district is one of the 49 legislative districts in the Nebraska Legislature. The district is located in eastern Nebraska and covers eastern Sarpy County. The district is centered around Bellevue and also includes surrounding unincorporated areas. The western border of the district follows along S 25th St, Blackhawk Dr, S 36th St, Schneekloth Rd, Dyson Hollow Rd, Platteview Rd, and US Route 75. Rita Sanders has represented the district since 2021.

== Demographics ==
The US Census Bureau recorded the population as of 2020 at 39,331.

- 72.28% of the district is White.
- 14.8% of the district is Hispanic.
- 6.3% of the district is Black.
- 2.7% of the district is Asian.
- 0.8% of the district is Native American.

== List of senators ==
Senator	Party	Years of service	Legislature	Residence
Rita Sanders	Republican	2021–present	107th-109th	Bellevue
Sue Crawford	Democratic	2013–2021	103rd-106th	Bellevue
Abbie Cornett	Republican	2005–2013	99th-102nd	Bellevue
Paul Hartnett	Democratic	1985–2005	89th-98th	Bellevue
George Fenger	Republican	1981–1985	87th-88th	Bellevue
Frank Lewis	Democratic	1973–1981	83rd-86th	Bellevue
