= Senator Cornett =

Senator Cornett may refer to:

- Abbie Cornett (born 1966), Nebraska State Senate
- Marshall E. Cornett (1898–1947), Oregon State Senate
