= Senator Hartnett =

Senator Hartnett may refer to:

- Paul Hartnett (1927–2022), Nebraska State Senate
- Thomas F. Hartnett (born 1941), South Carolina State Senate
