= Rita Sanders =

American politician

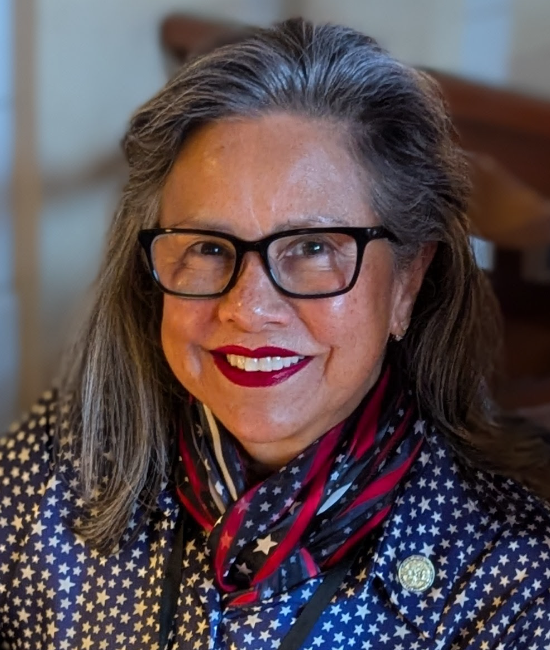

Member of the Nebraska Legislature from the 45th district
- Incumbent
- Assumed office January 6, 2021
- Preceded by: Sue Crawford

Personal details
- Born: June 30, 1958 (age 68) Oahu, Territory of Hawaii
- Party: Republican
- Spouse: Rick René Sanders
- Children: John Lukes, Michael Lukes
- Education: Bryman College; Bellevue University
- Occupation: Real estate agent

Rita Gomez Sanders is an American politician serving as a member of the Nebraska Legislature, representing the 45th district. Sanders served as the mayor of Bellevue, Nebraska, from 2010-2018.

== Early life ==
Sanders was born in Oahu, Hawaii, the daughter of a Filipino-American father whose parents came from Cebu City and Bohol and a German mother. She lived in Hawaii until she completed the fifth grade. She and her family then moved to Germany for five years, where she completed middle school. Sanders then moved to Livermore, California, where she graduated high school. Sanders attended Bryman College in Alhambra, California, where she completed her education in dental assisting. Since 2005, Sanders has been taking courses at Bellevue University, located in Bellevue, Nebraska.

Sanders settled down in Bellevue, which is where she started her family. Sanders is married to Rick René Sanders and they have two sons, John Lukes and Michael Lukes.

== Political career ==
=== Elected positions ===
Sanders was the mayor of the city of Bellevue, Nebraska. She served as mayor for 8 years. Sanders was elected in 2010 and reelected in 2014. She did not run for a third term in 2018. In the 2020 general election, Sanders was elected as a Nebraska State Senator representing district 45. Rita Sanders received 53.8% of the votes in the general election, defeating her opponent, Susan Hester, who received 46.2% of the votes. Sanders assumed office on January 6, 2021.

=== Committees ===
Rita Sanders was assigned to the Education Committee as well as the Government, Military, and Affairs Committee for the years 2021-2022.

=== Legislative Bills ===
==== Legislative Bill 389 ====
Sanders introduced the Legislative Bill 389. LB 389 is an amendment to Statute 79-813, Teachers' and administrators' certificates or permits; reciprocity; requirements. This bill adds Military Spouse Teacher Certification Reciprocity to Statute 79-813. LB 389 requires the state to issue certificates and permits to military spouse applicants that have been relocated to Nebraska and have valid certificates or permits in another state. These certificates and permits must contain similar endorsements as the certificates or permits issued to the applicants in another state. This bill also requires the state to issue a preliminary permit to applicants after they have submitted an application. This preliminary permit is temporary and valid until the commissioner has completed reviewing their application. Governor Pete Rickets approved this bill on 31 March 2021.

== Honors and awards ==
Rita Sanders has been awarded the following: AKSARBEN Good Neighbor Award (1994), Small Business Award of Excellence (2005), Ambassador of the Year Award, Bellevue Chamber of Commerce (2005), Silver Arrow Award (2007), Worthy Women of Distinction, Omaha World Herald (2009), Sarpy County Business Hall of Fame (2016), Excellence in Public Service Award, Filipino Asian American Hall of Fame (2017), and Distinguished Service Award, Nebraska National Guard (2018).

== See also ==
- List of mayors of Bellevue, Nebraska
