= William E. Galbraith =

Commander of the American Legion (1926–2012)

- Born: William Eugene Galbraith; January 22, 1926; Beemer, Nebraska, US
- Died: March 4, 2012 (aged 86); Chandler, Arizona, US
- Resting place: National Memorial Cemetery of Arizona; 33°41′39.8″N 112°01′08.4″W
- Education: University of Nebraska
- Occupation: Businessman
- Title: National Commander of The American Legion
- Term: 1967–1968
- Predecessor: John E. Davis
- Successor: William C. Doyle
- Spouse: Gwendolyn Galbraith
- Military career
- Allegiance: United States
- Branch: United States Navy
- Service years: 1944–1946
- Rank: Seaman 1st Class
- Conflicts: World War II

William E. Galbraith (born William Eugene Galbraith; January 22, 1926 – March 4, 2012) was an American businessman who served as the national commander of The American Legion from 1967 to 1968.

== Early life and education ==
Galbraith was a native of the rural town of Beemer, Nebraska. In 1944, he enlisted in the United States Navy and served during World War II as a radarman and an armed guard on liberty ships in the North Atlantic. After the war, Galbraith attended the University of Nebraska earning a Bachelor of Science in Agriculture.

== The American Legion ==
A prominent member of American Legion Post 159 in Beemer, Galbraith was elected post commander in 1953. He continued to serve The American Legion and became Department of Nebraska Commander from 1962-1963 and continued his ascent with The American Legion organization, serving as Nebraska's representative on the National Committee from 1964–1965, and National Vice-Commander of The American Legion 1965-1966 before being elected National Commander of The American Legion on 31 August 1967. He was the only national commander originating from the Department of Nebraska.

During his tenure as national commander, Galbraith gained recognition as a witty speaker who delivered vital speeches to include "Freedom is Not Free", "Law and Order", and "Have We Lost Faith in America?" His dedication to The American Legion and memory of sacrifices by the armed services were expressed in the motto he used during his term as national commander: "Freedom is Not Free".

Accomplishments during his term in office include planning the Legion's 50th anniversary, a visit to South Vietnam and launching the Stitch-in-Time program which sent sewing machines to that country, creation of the American Legion Task Force for the Future, testimony to the House Committee on Veteran's Affairs, and a 36,000 person climb in the numbers of Legionnaires during his term of office.

He was the chairman of the Nebraska Centennial Commission, Chairman of the Nebraska Governor's Conference on Education, and the Director of Nebraska Cornhusker Boys State. In 1969, he began work with the US Department of Agriculture as the Deputy Under Secretary of Congressional Relations in Washington DC and then as the Secretary of Agriculture's Representative to the mid-West region.

== Later life ==
Galbraith also served as the executive vice president for the North American Equipment Dealers Association in St. Louis, Missouri. Retiring in 1991, he moved to Sun Lakes, Arizona.

== See also ==
- List of people from Nebraska
- List of University of Nebraska people

Non-profit organization positions
Preceded by John E. Davis	National Commander of The American Legion; 1967–1968	Succeeded by William C. Doyle
