= 2022 Bellevue, Nebraska mayoral election =

2022 Bellevue mayoral election
- November 8, 2022
Nominee	Rusty Hike	Thomas Burns
Popular vote	9,921	8,076
Percentage	55.16%	44.69%
Results by precinct:
Hike:
50–60%
60–70%
Burns:
40–50%
Tie:
50%
No Votes
Mayor before election
Rusty Hike
Elected mayor
Rusty Hike

The 2022 Bellevue, Nebraska mayoral election took place on November 8, 2022. Incumbent Mayor Rusty Hike won re-election to a second term over City Councilman Thomas Burns with 55% of the vote.

== Primary election ==
=== Candidates ===
- Rusty Hike, incumbent Mayor
- Thomas Burns, City Councilman
- Otmar "Buz" Stephens, Marine Corps veteran

=== Campaign ===
Incumbent Mayor Rusty Hike, a Republican, ran for re-election, citing his leadership during the 2019 floods and the COVID-19 pandemic and the economic development taking place in the area. Hike pointed to the "growth going on down south around the Highway 34/75 corridor" and "development going in Old Towne Bellevue."FN1 His main opponent, City Councilman Thomas Burns, a Democrat, argued that Hike's development plans were not "transparent" and that city leadership "need[s] to take a holistic approach and focus on all parts of our city." He argued that the city needed to be more walkable and needed to update its infrastructure, including the library building. Marine Corps veteran Buz Stephens argued that the city's population growth was mostly attributed to annexation and that the "core" of the city was "very weak."

At the primary election, Hike placed first by a wide margin, winning 63% of the vote to Burns's 31% and Stephen's 5%. Hike and Burns advanced to the general election.

=== Results ===
2022 Bellevue mayoral primary election results
Party	Candidate	Votes	%
Nonpartisan	Rusty Hike (inc.)	5,480	63.47%
Nonpartisan	Thomas Burns	2,688	31.13%
Nonpartisan	O.E. Buz Stephens	431	4.99%
Write-in		35	0.41%
Total votes		8,634	100.00%

== General election ==
In the general election, Hike and Burns faced off again, but the result was closer, with Hike ultimately winning re-election with 55% of the vote.

=== Results ===
2022 Bellevue mayoral general election results
Party	Candidate	Votes	%
Nonpartisan	Rusty Hike (inc.)	9,921	55.16%
Nonpartisan	Thomas Burns	8,076	44.69%
Write-in		94	0.52%
Total votes		18,091	100.00%

== See also ==
- List of mayors of Bellevue, Nebraska
