= List of mayors of Bellevue, Nebraska =

The following is a list of mayors of the city of Bellevue, Nebraska, United States.

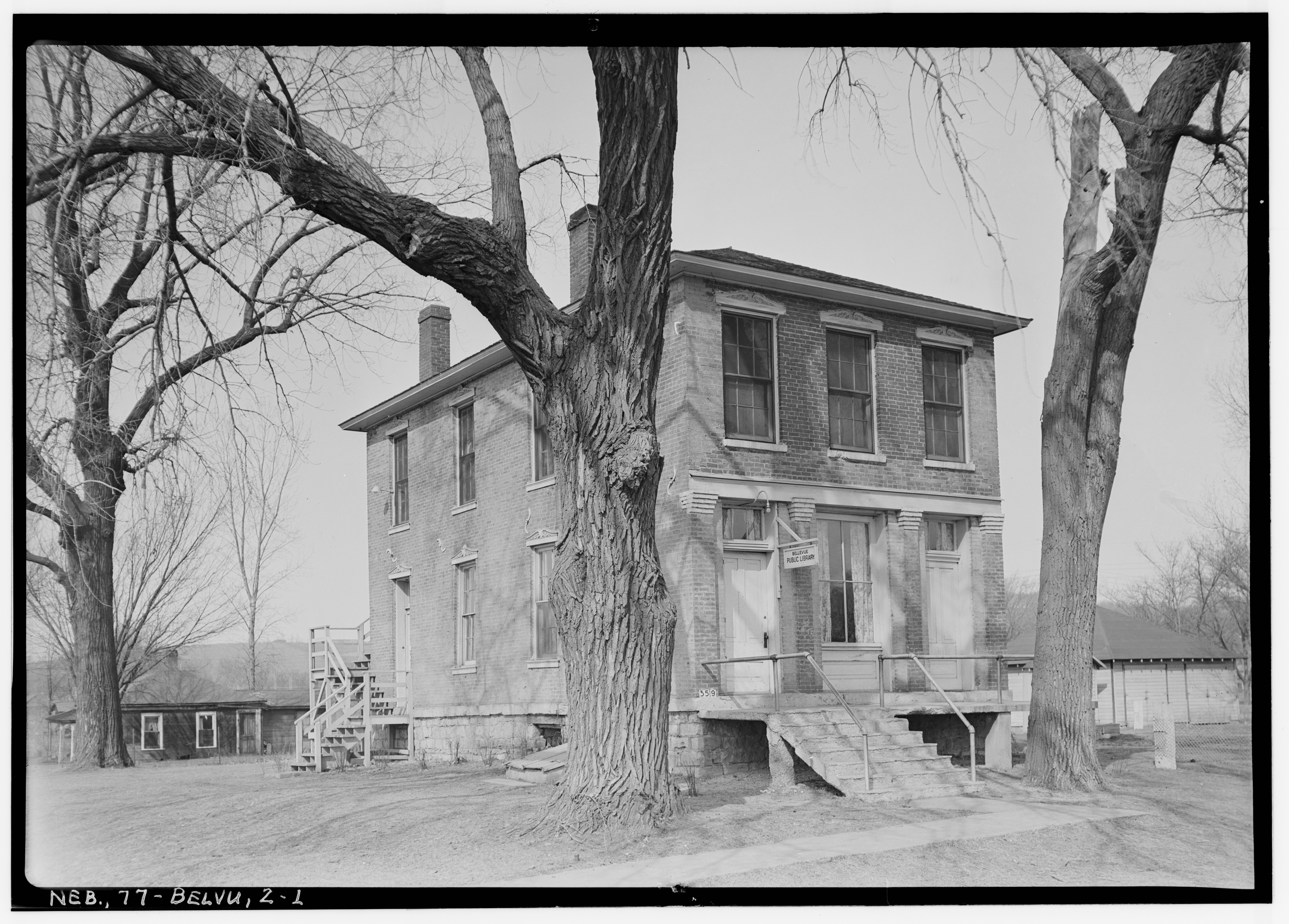
Town hall in Bellevue (1934)

- George Jennings, c.1855–1856
- Reuben Lovejoy, c.1857
- John Q. Goss, c.1860s?
- W.B. McDermut, c.1902
- J.A. Freeman, c.1915
- E. E. Rosser Jr., c.1932–1936
- F. J. Liese, c.1938
- F. H. Freeman, c.1940
- Vernon Woodle, c.1951
- Joe Morgan, c.1954
- Robert M. Haworth, c.1964–1970
- Joe Baldwin, 1982-1986
- Inez Boyd, 1987–1998
- Jerry Ryan, 1998–2006
- Ed Babbitt, 2007–2009
- Gary Mixan, c.2009
- Rita Sanders, 2010–2018
- Rusty Hike, 2018–2026
- Kevin Pflager, 2026–present

== See also ==
- 2022 Bellevue, Nebraska mayoral election
- Bellevue history
