= Ray Howlett =

American artist

- Born: 1940 (age 85–86); Lincoln, Nebraska, US
- Education: University of Nebraska
- Occupation: Artist
- Years active: 1965-present
- Known for: Light Sculpture

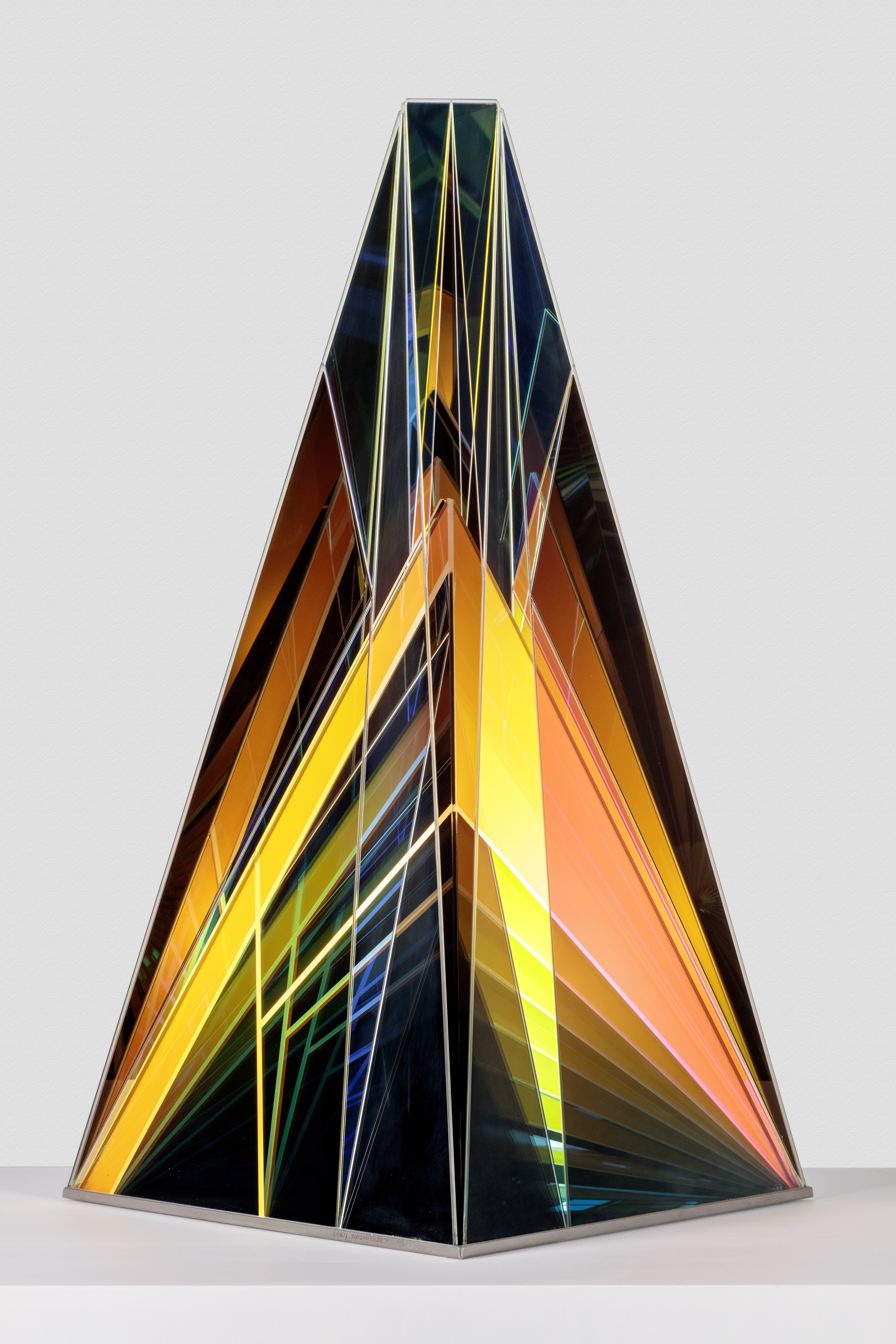
Ascension (2000) Ray Howlett

Ray Howlett (born 1940) is an American artist primarily associated with the light and space movement. He is known as one of the pioneers of infinity light sculptures.

== Early life and education ==
Howlett was born in Lincoln, Nebraska. In 1963, he graduated with a Bachelor of Fine Arts from the University of Nebraska. He moved to Los Angeles in 1965, where he was influenced like many of the other Light and Space artists at the time to experiment with sculptural mediums and became inspired by the interaction of mixing reflective surfaces with electric light. The result was the development of a completely new, complex art form that he calls "Contained Reflective Light Sculpture."

== Work ==
Howlett’s earliest work were painting on large canvases, experimenting with the push and pull of visual space. In 1972, he began making serigraph prints on glass, mounting and spacing them in front of his paintings. This expanded into experiments with mirror and transparent reflective coatings on glass. Finally, incorporating electric lights into his pieces, to increase the dimensional effects, his paintings became sculptural.

In 1975, one of his first light sculptures was singled out by art critic, Alfred Frankenstein, while he called the show “an unmitigated disaster” he noted that “only one has any business being shown in an art museum. That work is called “Vortex” by Ray Howlett.”

Howlett's sculptures create a colorful and abstract optical space larger than the piece itself what he calls an "optically expanding space". In his structural forms, illuminated graphic images appear to be floating within transparent sculptures. The internal composition and colors shift and change as the viewer moves around it.

=== Museum Permanent Collections ===
Howlett's work is represented in numerous public collections including;

Year	Museum	City	Country
2013	Amarillo Museum of Art	Amarillo, Texas	United States
2007	Loveland Museum	Loveland, Colorado	United States
2007	Erie Art Museum	Erie, Pennsylvania	United States
2007	Museum of Dichroic Art	Orange County, California	United States
2006	Butler Institute of American Art	Youngstown, Ohio	United States
2005	Northern Galleries at Northern State University	Aberdeen, South Dakota	United States
2003	West Valley Art Museum	Surprise, Arizona	United States
2002	Masur Art Museum	Monroe, Louisiana	United States
2002	Arts and Science Center for Southeast Arkansas,	Pine Bluff, Arkansas	United States
2002	Midwest Museum of American Art	Elkhart, Indiana	United States
2001	Thorne-Sagendorph Art Gallery at Keene State College	Keene, New Hampshire	United States
2000	Museum of Neon Art	Los Angeles, California	United States
1999	Springfield Art Museum	Springfield, Missouri	United States
1999	The Kaleidoscope Art Museum	Sendai	Japan
1999	Midland Center for the Arts	Midland, Michigan	United States
1998	The Grace Museum	Abilene, Texas	United States
1998	Museum of Art Oklahoma State University	Stillwater, Oklahoma	United States
1996	Lakeview Museum of Arts and Sciences	Peoria, Illinois	United States
1994	Louisiana Art and Science Museum	Baton Rouge, Louisiana	United States
1991	Museum of Science	Boston, Massachusetts	United States
1989	SciTech Museum	Aurora, Illinois	United States
1987	Los Angeles County Museum of Natural History	Los Angeles, California	United States
1987	Frederick R. Weisman Art Foundation	Los Angeles, California	United States
