= John Hyde Sweet =

American politician (1880–1964)

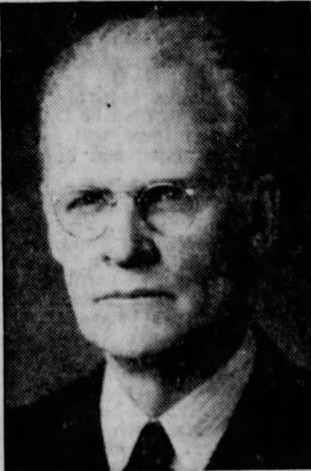
- Lincoln Evening Journal (Lincoln, NE), December 20, 1947

Member of the U.S. House of Representatives from Nebraska's 1st district
- In office April 19, 1940 – January 3, 1941
- Preceded by: George H. Heinke
- Succeeded by: Oren S. Copeland

Personal details
- Born: September 1, 1880 Milford, New York
- Died: April 4, 1964 (aged 83) Wickenburg, Arizona
- Party: Republican

John Hyde Sweet (usually referred to as J. Hyde Sweet) (September 1, 1880 – April 4, 1964) was an American newspaper publisher Republican Party politician. He was most notable for his brief service as a member of the United States House of Representatives from Nebraska.

== Biography ==
Sweet was born in Milford, New York on September 1, 1880, and moved to Palmyra, Nebraska in 1885. He attended the University of Nebraska and Lincoln Business College in Lincoln, Nebraska.

After graduating, he worked as court reporter in western Nebraska from 1899 to 1900, and then as a grocer in Nebraska City from 1902 to 1909. After that he served as manager and then editor of the Nebraska City News newspaper and was a Nebraskan delegate to the 1912 Progressive National Convention.

In 1940 was elected as a Republican to the Seventy-sixth United States Congress to fill the vacancy left by the previous representative George H. Heinke, who had died in a car crash in the January of that year. Sweet served for less than a year, and did not run in the following election.

He died April 4, 1964, in Wickenburg, Arizona and was buried at Wyuka Cemetery, Nebraska City, Nebraska.

U.S. House of Representatives
Preceded by George H. Heinke (R)	Member of the U.S. House of Representatives from Nebraska's 1st congressional district April 19, 1940 – January 3, 1941	Succeeded by Oren S. Copeland (R)
