= Mohammad Kabir Hassan =

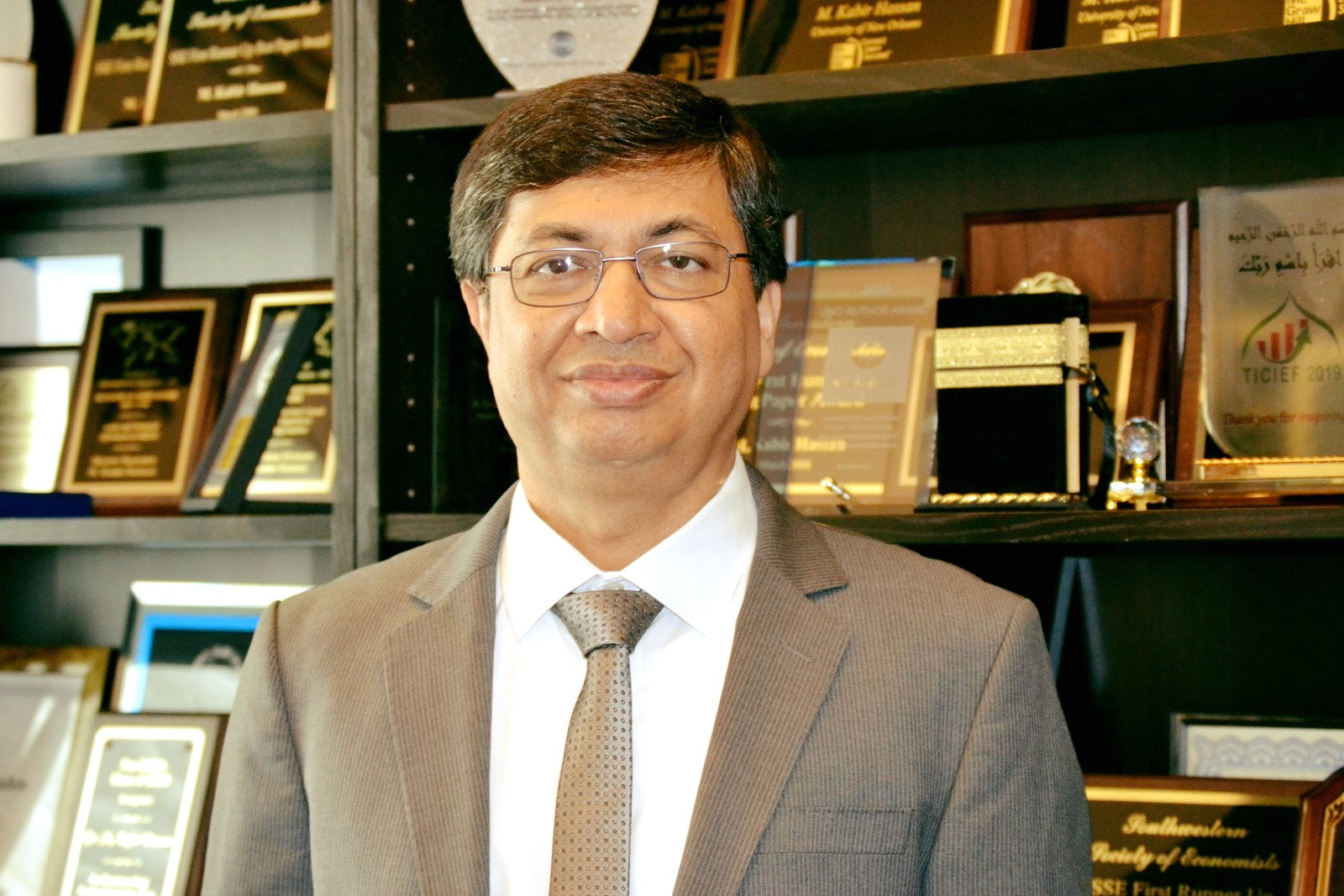
- Born: 1 October 1963 (age 63); Comilla, Pakistan
- Spouse: Tahmina Hassan (m. 1993)

Academic background
- Education: Gustavus Adolphus College, Minnesota; University of Nebraska–Lincoln

Academic work
- Discipline: Islamic Banking and Finance
- Institutions: University of New Orleans
- Awards: Islamic Development Bank (IDB) Prize in Islamic Banking and Finance (2016)
- Website: Information at IDEAS / RePEc

Mohammad Kabir Hassan (alternatively called M. Kabir Hassan, M.K Hassan, or Kabir Hassan) (born 1 October 1963) is a Bangladeshi-American economist who serves as Professor of Finance at University of New Orleans. He has been providing consultancy to International Monetary Fund, World Bank, Transparency International Bangladesh, African Development Bank, Islamic Development Bank and Government of Turkey.

His principal work focuses to link the Islamic banking and finance with real and sustainable economy. He criticized and warned the Islamic finance industry against perils of practices of "fatwa-shopping".

== Personal life and education ==
Hassan was born and received his early education in Bangladesh. He moved to the United States in 1983 and received a Bachelor of Arts with major in economics and mathematics from Gustavus Adolphus College in Minnesota. He was awarded a Master's degree in economics and a Doctor of Philosophy degree in finance from the University of Nebraska–Lincoln in 1987 and 1990, respectively.

He resides in New Orleans, Louisiana with his wife, Tahmina Hassan, and two children.

== Career ==
After receiving his doctorate, Hassan joined the Department of Economics and Finance at the University of New Orleans. At University of New Orleans, he was also awarded the honorary positions of Bank One Professor in Business and Hibernia Professor of Economics and Finance.

In addition to Islamic banking and finance, his major areas of research include international finance, development economics, corporate finance and financial institutions and markets. He has supervised more than 60 doctoral students at University of New Orleans and also mentored more than 40 theses from India, Malaysia, Saudi Arabia, United States, Canada, Australia and New Zealand.

== Research and publications ==
Hassan's publication record include more than 350 book chapters and papers published in refereed journals. He is one of the most cited researchers in finance literature. As per Google Scholar, his H-index score is 64. In addition to papers in academic and professional journals, he has published and edited several books:

- Hassan, K., Rashid, M., & Aliyu, S. (2019). Islamic corporate finance. Taylor and Francis, .
- Hassan, M. K., & Rashid, M. (2019). Management of Islamic finance: Principle, practice, and performance. Emerald.
- Khalifa Mohamed Ali, M. Kabir Hassan, and Abd elrahman Elzahi Saaid Ali.. (2019). Revitalization of Waqf for socio-economic development: Volume II. Springer.
- Hassan, M. K. (2017). Handbook of empirical research on Islam and economic life. E. Elgar.
- Hassan, M. K., Ahmad, A. U. F., & Oseni, U. A. (2016). Fundamentals of Islamic banking and finance. wiley.
- Hassan, M. K., & Lewis, M. K. (2014). Handbook on Islam and economic life. E. Elgar
- Hassan, M. K., Kayed, R. N., & Oseni, U. A. (2013). Introduction to Islamic banking & finance: Principles and practice. Harlow: Pearson.
- Kayed, R. N., & Hassan, K. (2013). Islamic entrepreneurship. London: Routledge.
- Hassan, K., & Mahlknecht, M. (2011). Islamic capital markets: Products and strategies. Hoboken, N.J: Wiley
- Hassan, K., & Lewis, M. (2009). The handbook of Islamic banking. Cheltenham: Edward Elgar

== Islamic Finance and Political Economy in Bangladesh ==
Hassan's work on the Islamic charity of Zakat is a notable hallmark. In 2008, he helped in establishing the Center for Zakat Management (CZM) in Bangladesh with vision to encourage Zakat eligible Muslims to distribute the charity among needy as per Shariah. His remarkable finding in the field of economics associating Islamic finance emphasis on two-point; first, Islamic financing aim to develop sustainable economic system and ensure the financial inclusion from both agriculture and industrial sector. Second, Institutional framework should be designed to execute and benefit from full potential of Islamic mode of financing. The Rural Development Scheme (RDS) of the Islamic Bank Bangladesh Limited (IBBL) are inspired via his notable research in Islamic social finance.

Recently, Hassan has indicated his views in the favor of rapid economic growth for Bangladesh keeping in mind the high potential in garment, fishing, and agriculture sectors. In an interview to CGTN America, he has emphasized that a stable political situation in the country and the region is a vital requirement for economic growth and also suggested that Chinese company's investment in Bangladesh can be very useful in a much rapid economic expansion.

== Awards and achievements ==
Hassan won the Islamic Development Bank (IDB) Prize in 2016, the prestigious and highest award in the field of Islamic banking and finance. In 2019, he named faculty member of the year by University of Louisiana System.

== Other professional and academic activities ==
Hassan is the editor-in-chief of the International Journal of Islamic and Middle Eastern Finance and Management and senior editor of the International Journal of Emerging Markets.

He has served as chairperson of the Academy of International Business-US Southwest, vice president of the Association for Economic and Development Studies on Bangladesh, and president and director of the Southern Finance Association.
