= Frank Lewis (Nebraska politician) =

American politician

Member of the Nebraska Legislature from the 45th district
- In office January 3, 1973 – January 7, 1981
- Preceded by: Ellen Craft (redistricting)
- Succeeded by: George Fenger

Personal details
- Born: January 18, 1939 (age 87) Sulphur, Oklahoma
- Party: Democratic (until 1970, 1973–present); Republican (1970–1973)
- Spouse: Linda Battles (m. 1960)
- Children: 2 (Trudy, Terry)
- Education: East Central State College (B.A.), University of Nebraska–Lincoln, University of Nebraska at Omaha

Frank Lewis (born January 18, 1939) is Democratic politician from Nebraska who served as a member of the Nebraska Legislature from the 45th district from 1973 to 1981.

== Early life ==
Lewis was born in Sulphur, Oklahoma, in 1939, and grew up in Stratford, and graduated from Stratford High School. He attended East Central State College, receiving his bachelor's degree, and completed graduate work at East Central, the University of Nebraska–Lincoln, and the University of Nebraska at Omaha. Lewis worked as a high school teacher in Bellevue, and served as a member of the Bellevue City Planning Commission.

== Nebraska Legislature ==
In 1972, Lewis ran for the state legislature from the newly created 45th district, which was created in Sarpy County. In the nonpartisan primary, Lewis faced Bellevue City Councilman Joseph Baldwin, retired U.S. Air Force lieutenant colonel Julius Neal Clemmer, real estate salesman Larry Tatum, and lawyer George Thompson. Lewis placed first in the primary, winning 28 percent of the vote, and advanced to the general election with Baldwin, who placed second with 20 percent. Lewis defeated Baldwin by a wide margin, winning 58 percent of the vote to Baldwin's 42 percent.

Lewis, who was originally elected as a registered Republican, announced on July 13, 1973, that he would switch to the Democratic Party. Lewis, who had been a registered Democrat until 1970, then switched to the Republican Party, citing the Vietnam War. He decided to switch back to the Democratic Party "because my ideas match many of those Democrats I work with every day."

In 1976, Lewis ran for re-election to a second term, and was challenged by businessman Julius Clemmer. Lewis placed first in the primary by a wide margin, receiving 73 percent of the vote to Clemmer's 27 percent. They advanced to the general election, where Lewis won re-election in a landslide, defeating Clemmer, 74–26 percent.

Lewis sought a third term in 1980, and was challenged for re-election by businessman George Fenger. Lewis placed first in the primary, receiving 60 percent of the vote to Fenger's 40 percent, and they proceeded to the general election. Fenger ultimately defeated Lewis, winning 54 percent of the vote to Lewis's 46 percent.
