= Oren S. Copeland =

American politician (1887–1958)

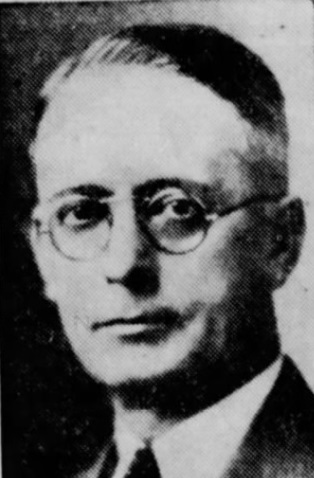
- Lincoln Star, May 5, 1937

Member of the U.S. House of Representatives from Nebraska's 1st district
- In office January 3, 1941 – January 3, 1943
- Preceded by: John Hyde Sweet
- Succeeded by: Carl Curtis

31st Mayor of Lincoln
- In office May 10, 1937 – February 28, 1940
- Preceded by: Charles W. Bryan
- Succeeded by: Robert Erle Campbell

Personal details
- Born: Oren Sturman Copeland; March 16, 1887 Huron, South Dakota
- Died: April 10, 1958 (aged 71) Lincoln, Nebraska, U.S.
- Resting place: Wyuka Cemetery
- Party: Republican
- Spouse: Iva C. Young
- Children: Richard E. Copeland

Oren Sturman Copeland (March 16, 1887 – April 10, 1958) was an American Republican Party politician. From 1941 to 1943, he served one term in the U.S. House of Representatives.

== Biography ==
He was born on a farm near Huron, South Dakota on March 16, 1887, and moved with his parents to Pender, Nebraska in 1891. He attended the University of Nebraska from 1904 to 1907.

=== Early career ===
He worked at a Lincoln newspaper in 1910 and a gas station in 1913.

He served as city commissioner in the department of public safety from 1935 to 1937 when he was elected mayor of Lincoln.

=== Congress ===
He resigned as mayor to run for congress and was elected to the Seventy-seventh United States Congress, serving one term from 1941 to 1943.

=== Later career ===
He was unsuccessful in being renominated and returned to the retail fuel business.

He was a delegate to the 1912 Republican National Convention.

=== Death and burial ===
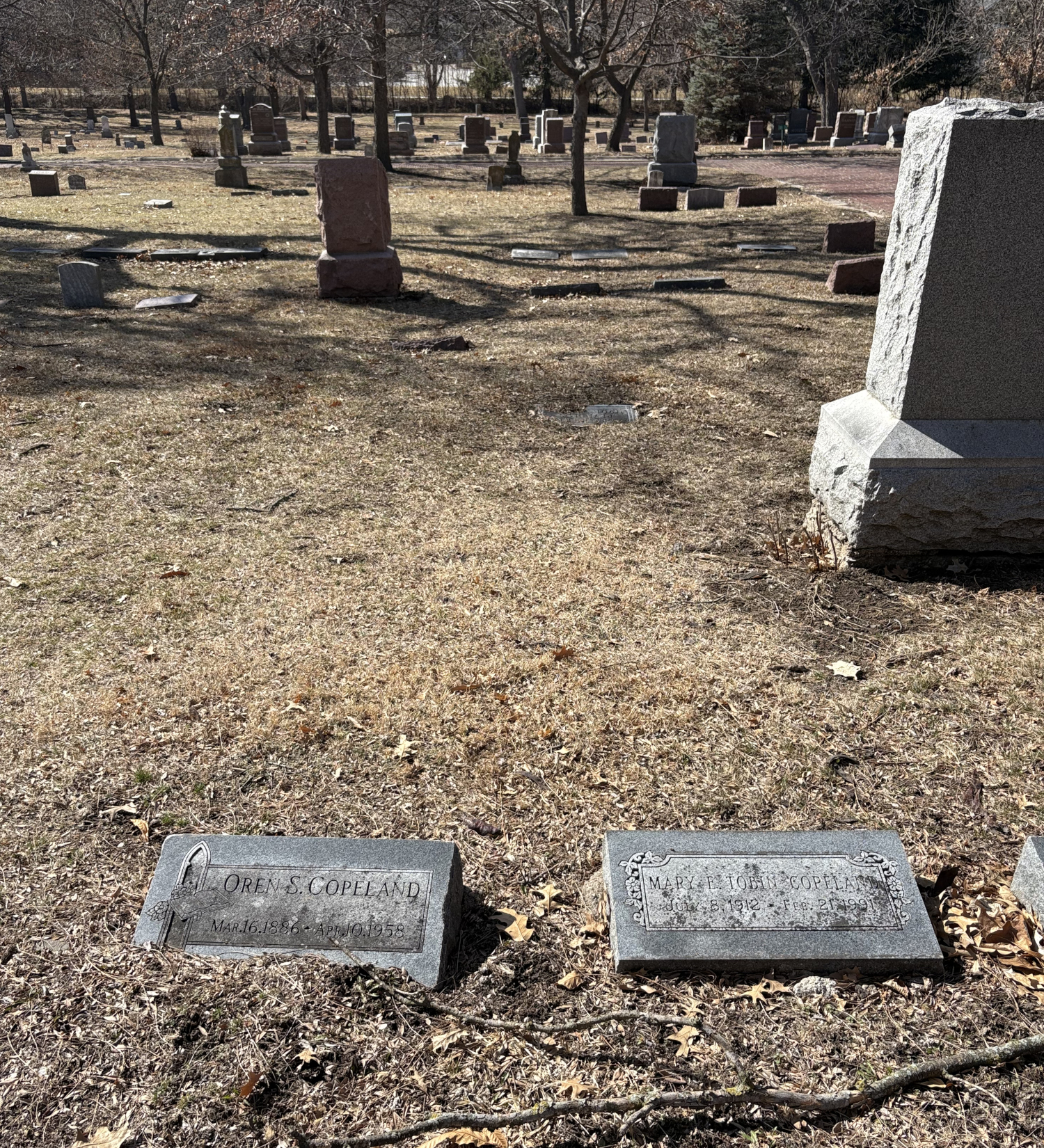
Copeland's grave at Wyuka Cemetery

He died in Lincoln on April 10, 1958, and is buried there in Wyuka Cemetery.

Political offices
Preceded by Charles W. Bryan	Mayor of Lincoln; 1937 – 1940	Succeeded by Robert Erle Campbell
U.S. House of Representatives
Preceded by John Hyde Sweet (R)	Member of the U.S. House of Representatives from Nebraska's 1st congressional district January 3, 1941 – January 3, 1943	Succeeded by Carl T. Curtis (R)
