= Margaret B. Fuller Boos =

Geologist - influential actor in the study of pegmatite geology

- Born: June 17, 1892; Beatrice, Nebraska, U.S.
- Died: August 20, 1978 (aged 86); Denver, Colorado, U.S.
- Other names: Margaret Bradley Fuller, Peggy Boos
- Occupations: Geologist, park ranger

Margaret Bradley Fuller Boos (June 17, 1892 – August 20, 1978) was an American geologist and park ranger, known for the study of pegmatite geology. Although she did not begin her career in the study of pegmatite, it became her niche as her career developed. Boos spent a large portion of her life throughout the Colorado Rockies. Through her many years of fieldwork, she was most noted for her ability to map a large proportion of the Front Rage in Colorado with the help of her husband, Charles Maynard Boos.

== Early life ==
Margaret née Fuller was born June 17, 1892, in Beatrice, Nebraska, United States, the daughter of Roy D. Fuller and Mabel A. Bradley Fuller. She began her post-secondary education in Lincoln at the University of Nebraska, before finishing the remaining two years of her degree at Northwestern University in Evanston, Illinois in 1913.

She worked as a high school science teacher after college. Fuller earned a master's degree in geology at the University of Chicago, and completed doctoral studies there in 1924.

== Geological contributions ==
Margaret B. Fuller Boos' primary interest was in mapping and interpreting the granite intrusives on the Colorado Front Range and discovered the first lithium pegmatite in the front range. During her time as a geology professor, she mapped the granite intrusives and pegmatites in the Denver Mountain Parks area. In 1922, Boos mapped the Precambrian area north and south of the Big Thompson River, as well as the extent of the Longs Peak and Mt. Olympus granites. In 1924, she continued her research in the Big Thompson River, yet this time focusing on the glacial features along the river. After her marriage to Charles Maynard Boos, the newly weds both went out to work for Empire Gas and Fuel as petroleum geologists.

In the summer of 1928, she was offered a job as a part-time ranger-naturalist at Rocky Mountain National Park. After accepting the job, offered to her by the superintendent Roger Toll, she became the first female ranger-naturalist at Rocky Mountain National Park. Toll wrote to her that he "[would] prefer a man for the job", but her expertise outshined her status as a woman. One year later, in 1929, Roger Toll offered Boos a full-time position working at the Park, but she graciously declined the offer and returned to the petroleum industry.

During the summers of 1929–1931 Margaret and Charles spent their time elaborating and expanding on Margaret's "Hard Rock" thesis. The two combined their work with the Colorado School of Mines and the University of Wisconsin; this led to a series of presentations and conversations, resulting in their summary paper on Longs Peak-St.Vrain Batholith.

The Boos' work was considered important to geology at the time because the plutons and their contacts had not been previously determined. Margaret began teaching once again at the University of Denver in South Denver, Colorado, where she and her student, Esther Aberdeen, published a paper with a map describing these plutons. Boos began to further investigate the pegmatites throughout the Denver Mountain Parks region. Margaret then notes that there are tourmaline-bearing and beryl-bearing pegmatites. This began further research into beryl, mica, tantalum and lithium pegmatites.

In 1943, Margaret began working full-time for the Bureau of Mines on their strategic minerals program. She transferred to the United States Bureau of Reclamation (1945) in order to move back to Denver. In 1947, Boos quit the bureau to become a geological consultant with her office at home. She then published her pegmatite conclusions in 1945, which contained a map of the Denver Parks area covering 540 square miles of the area. Afterwards, Margaret continued as an active geologist until 1968.

Margaret and her husband also worked for Sharples Oil and Carter Oil for some time. Their experiences in these companies, and focus on stratigraphy, led to one of their most significant contributions; a paper about the tectonics of the eastern flank and foothills of the Front Range in Colorado.

== Pegmatite in the Colorado Front Range ==
Margaret began mapping the Colorado Front Range in the summer of 1921. Specifically, Margaret examined and mapped different sections of the Precambrian terrain of the Front Range in order to describe the relationship between the Precambrian tectonics and the Laramide and post-laramide tectonics in 1921-1922, 1928-1929, and 1932-1934. Areas that were locally known were mapped in detail between the years 1934 and 1943. Work that was done previously was reviewed in the field and areas that were previously not mapped, were examined in 1950-1951 and 1953-1955. Margaret's husband, Charles, mapped the sedimentary formations of the eastern foothills of the Front Range between 1930 and 1952 and continued his work throughout 1954 and 1955. Throughout her mapping exploration of the Denver Rockies area, Fuller discovered that the pegmatites were scattered around and near the granite deposits. The exploration and discoveries that Margaret Fuller was making on the subject of pegmatites were based on her doctoral thesis while completing her Ph.D. at the University of Chicago.

Though this went unnoticed until it was rediscovered by D.M Sheridan, one of Margaret's great discoveries in the Front Range was the discovery of green tourmaline. She discovered this rare mineral at the Bald Mt. pegmatite in 1939.

Margaret and her husband, Charles, were attracted to the pegmatite found in granite deposits throughout the front range. Although they were primarily working in the oil industry or "soft rocks", they spent their free time exploring their "hard rock" theory regarding pegmatite. One of the things that this couple accomplished, was the ability to distinguish all the varying types of granite that appeared throughout the front range. This included the "Sherman granite, Log Cabin granite, Longs Peak (Mt. Olympus) Vrain granite, Boulder Creek granite, Silver Plume granite, Mt.Evans granite, Pikes Peak granite and Cripple Creek granite". The area had not been previously mined so the discovery and documentation of the region was a huge geological step in the Denver Rockies region.

Boos' most significant paper, titled Genesis of Precambrian granitic Pegmatites in the Denver Mountain Parks area, Colorado, was published in 1954. This paper included the detailed descriptions and locations of 23 pegmatites. Out of these 23 pegmatites, 16 had never been described before.

== Awards and recognitions ==
In 1964, Margaret B. Fuller Boos established the Margaret Fuller Boos Fellowship in Geology at Northwestern University. The Fellowship awards $2,000 per year to a woman graduate student in the field of geology. Later on in life, Boos was awarded a lifetime membership to the Rocky Mountain Association of Geologists, as well as the Distinguished Alumnus Award from Northwestern University. As her final recognition in the field of petroleum geology, she was honoured the title of "Petroleum's First Lady" at the International Petroleum Exhibition in Tulsa, Oklahoma.

Due to her continuous support of women studying geology at Northwestern University, the Margret Fuller Boos Scholarship is now awarded to outstanding female geologists attending Northwestern.

In 1975 Margaret Fuller Boos was honoured by The US Board of Geographic Names when they named a mountain in the Talkateena Mountains of central Alaska in honour of Peggy Boos. The unnamed mountain has since been renamed 'Peggy's Peak'.

== Personal life ==
On September 3, 1927, Margaret married fellow geologist C. Maynard Boos in Estes Park, Colorado. Margaret Fuller Boos died on August 20, 1978, in Denver, Colorado.
