= George H. Heinke =

American politician (1882–1940)

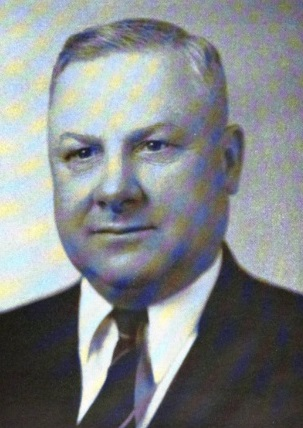
- Frontispiece of 1941's George Henry Heinke, Late a Representative

Member of the U.S. House of Representatives from Nebraska's 1st district
- In office January 3, 1939 – January 2, 1940
- Preceded by: Henry Carl Luckey
- Succeeded by: John Hyde Sweet

Personal details
- Born: July 22, 1882 Dunbar, Nebraska
- Died: January 2, 1940 (aged 57) Morrilton, Arkansas, U.S.
- Party: Republican
- Education: University of Nebraska College of Law

George Henry Heinke (July 22, 1882 – January 2, 1940) was a Nebraska Republican politician.

== Early life ==
He was born on a farm on July 22, 1882, near Dunbar, Nebraska, and moved in 1889 to Douglas, Nebraska, in 1891 to San Angelo, Texas, and in 1894 to Talmage, Nebraska. He graduated from the University of Nebraska College of Law and passed the bar in 1908. He set up practice in Nebraska City, Nebraska.

== Career ==
He became the prosecuting attorney for Otoe County, Nebraska, from 1919 to 1923 and 1927 to 1935. In 1939, he was elected to the Seventy-sixth United States Congress and served from January 3, 1939, until January 2, 1940.

== Death ==
On January 2, 1940, while en route to Washington, D.C., he died in a car crash in Morrilton, Arkansas. He is buried in Wyuka Cemetery in Nebraska City.

== See also ==
- List of members of the United States Congress who died in office (1900–1949)

U.S. House of Representatives
Preceded by Henry Carl Luckey (D)	Member of the U.S. House of Representatives from Nebraska's 1st congressional district January 3, 1939 – January 2, 1940	Succeeded by John Hyde Sweet (R)
