= Sue Crawford =

American politician (born 1967)

Member of the Nebraska Legislature from the 45th district
- In office January 9, 2013 – January 6, 2021
- Preceded by: Abbie Cornett
- Succeeded by: Rita Sanders

Personal details
- Born: January 10, 1967 (age 59) Maryville, Missouri
- Party: Democratic
- Education: Truman State University (B.S.); Indiana University (Ph.D.)
- Occupation: Professor, political scientist
- Website: Campaign website Legislative profile

Sue Crawford (born January 10, 1967) née Sue Steinhauser, is a politician from the U.S. state of Nebraska. She represented District 45, which includes the city of Bellevue and Offutt Air Force Base, in the Nebraska Legislature.

== Education ==
Crawford received her BS in political science from Truman State University in 1989. In 1995, she completed her PhD from Indiana University Bloomington in the fields of American government and public policy, with a concentration in public management. While at IU, Crawford worked closely and co-published with Elinor Ostrom, a Nobel Prize winner in economics. From 1995 to 2021, she was a professor of political science at Creighton University.

== Elections ==
Crawford was first elected to represent Nebraska's 45th District in 2012. Crawford placed second in the May 15, 2012, non-partisan primary election, receiving 48.34% of the vote. On November 6, 2012, Crawford won the general election with 51.38% of the vote. She was sworn in on January 9, 2013.

After leaving the legislature, Crawford became the city administrator for York, Nebraska
