= August Luebs =

August A. Luebs (February 28, 1889 – September 8, 1989) was an American mechanical engineer and an expert on air conditioning and heating. He pioneered the science of air conditioning in the early part of the twentieth century.

Born in Wood River, Nebraska, Luebs was a professor at the University of Nebraska from 1917 until retiring in 1958 in the university's mechanical engineering department. His early career was as a salesman for the International Harvester Company.

In the 1930s he perfected a method of measuring fuel requirements in air-conditioning called a degree-day, which represents one degree of variation from a standard average daily temperature. He also developed ratings for oil-heating and gas-heating equipment.

Luebs died in Lincoln, Nebraska, on September 8, 1989, at age 100.
