= Michael D. Navrkal =

American Major General

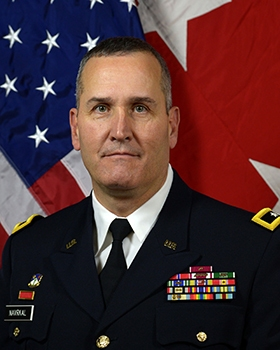
Michael D. Navrkal

Michael D. Navrkal is a retired major general in the Army National Guard.

== Career ==
Navrkal was commissioned an officer in 1981 and was assigned to the 67th Infantry Brigade in Nebraska City, Nebraska. He remained there until he was assigned to the 32nd Separate Infantry Brigade in Madison, Wisconsin in 1991.

In 1996, Navrkal was assigned to the 35th Infantry Division in Lincoln, Nebraska. Later, he was deployed to serve in the Iraq War. He was named Assistant Adjutant General - Army of the Nebraska National Guard in 2011. In 2013, Navrkal was promoted to major general and assumed command of the 35th Infantry Division.

Awards he has received include the Distinguished Service Medal with oak leaf cluster, Defense Superior Service Medal, Legion of Merit with oak leaf cluster, the Bronze Star Medal, the Meritorious Service Medal with four oak leaf clusters, the Army Commendation Medal with two oak leaf clusters, the Army Achievement Medal with two oak leaf clusters, the Army Reserve Components Achievement Medal with one silver and one bronze oak leaf cluster, the National Defense Service Medal with service star, the Iraq Campaign Medal with two service stars, the Global War on Terrorism Service Medal, the Military Outstanding Volunteer Service Medal, the Armed Forces Reserve Medal with gold hourglass device and mobilization device, the Army Service Ribbon and the Overseas Service Ribbon.

== Education ==
- University of Nebraska–Lincoln
- Bellevue University
- United States Army Logistics Management College
- United States Army War College
