= Bellevue University =

Private university in Bellevue, Nebraska, US

Coordinates: 41°09′02″N 95°55′09″W

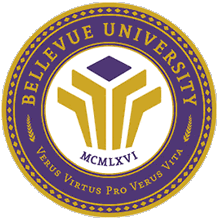
- Former name: Bellevue College (1966–1994)
- Motto: Real Learning for Real Life
- Type: Private university
- Established: 1966
- Endowment: $106,319,108 (2023)
- President: Mary Hawkins
- Students: 13,841 (fall 2022)
- Undergraduates: 6,828
- Postgraduates: 3,476
- Location: Bellevue, Nebraska, U.S.
- Campus: Suburban
- Colors: Purple & Gold
- Nickname: Bruins
- Sporting affiliations: NAIA – Frontier
- Website: bellevue.edu

Bellevue University is a private university in Bellevue, Nebraska, United States. It opened in 1966 as Bellevue College and re-branded to its current name in 1994. As of 2011, 80% of its undergraduates were aged 25 and over. The university has over 10,000 students enrolled in a variety of undergraduate and graduate programs.

== History ==
Bellevue University was announced as Bellevue College in late-1965. The college was developed after the development of a public community college failed. The college was originally located in a building previously owned by the International Telephone and Telegraph Corporation, and was renovated for academic purposes the following year. The college officially opened in September 1966.

In the mid-1980s, Bellevue College announced a $2.5 million re-development project, which added a new student center, soccer field, and renovated many of the buildings. The college expanded to offering master's degree programs in 1990. In 1994, the college rebranded to Bellevue University. Additionally, the administration building was renovated and a new classroom building was built.

On March 9, 2020, the Department of Veterans Affairs suspended G.I. Bill reimbursement eligibility for Bellevue University and several other schools due to what the V.A. said were "erroneous, deceptive, or misleading enrollment and advertising practices", giving the schools 60 days to take "corrective action". The VA withdrew its threat of sanctions in July 2020.

In 2021, Bellevue University announced a partnership with the East Coast Hockey League (ECHL) to provide career development and limited number of scholarships to ECHL players, coaches, and other staff. In 2022, Bellevue announced a similar partnership with the Southern Professional Hockey League (SPHL) to provide tuition reimbursement to SPHL players, staff, and family to attend Bellevue.

== Academics ==
Undergraduate demographics as of 2025
Race and ethnicity	Total
White	50%
Hispanic	15%
Native American	1%
Asian	3%
Black	16%
Two or more races	3%
Unknown	11%
Economic diversity
Low-income (Note: The percentage of students who received an income-based federal Pell grant intended for low-income students.)	31%
Affluent (Note: The percentage of students who are a part of the American middle class at the bare minimum.)	69%

Bellevue University is a private non-profit university. As of 2025, the college has 10,400 students enrolled. The college has 48 undergraduate fields of study. Major fields of study include Business Administration, Computer/Information Technology Administration and Management, Business Operations Support and Assistant Services, Business/Commerce, and Social Sciences.

== Campus ==
Bellevue Universities main campus is in Bellevue. It is a suburban-style campus. The campus includes four dormitories, two administration buildings, an auditorium, a library, a bookstore, and a field house.

=== Gallery ===
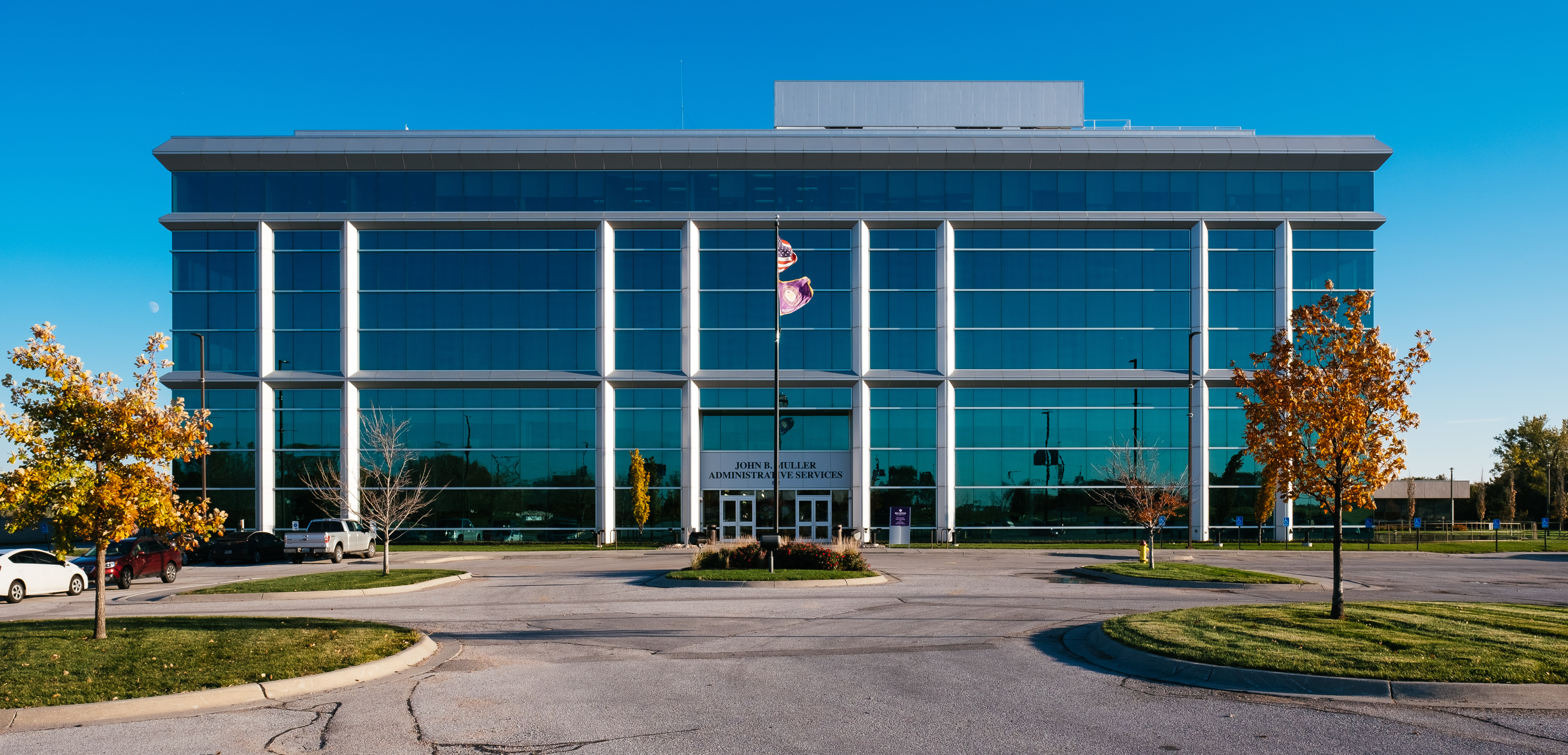
John B. Muller Building

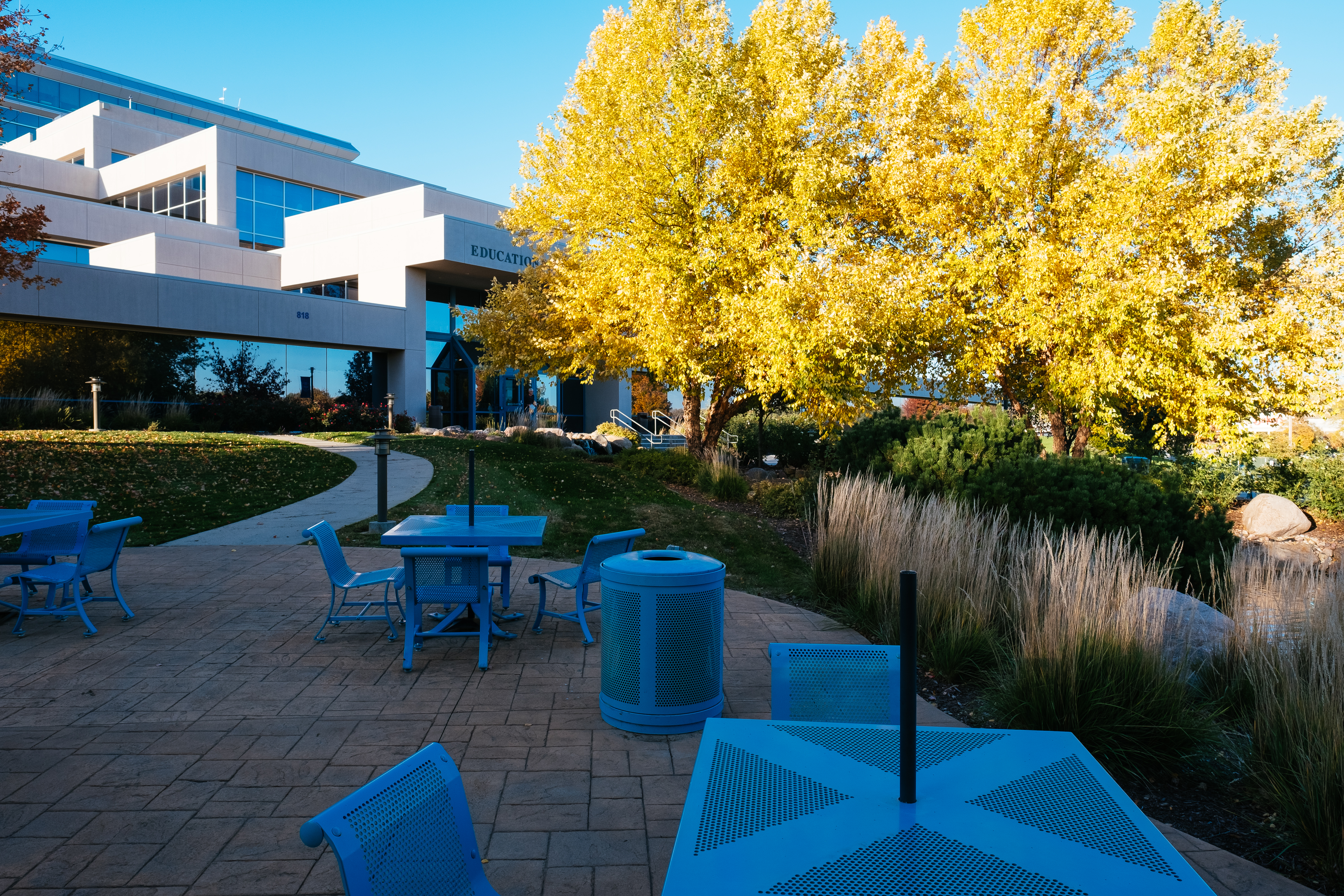
Cafeteria

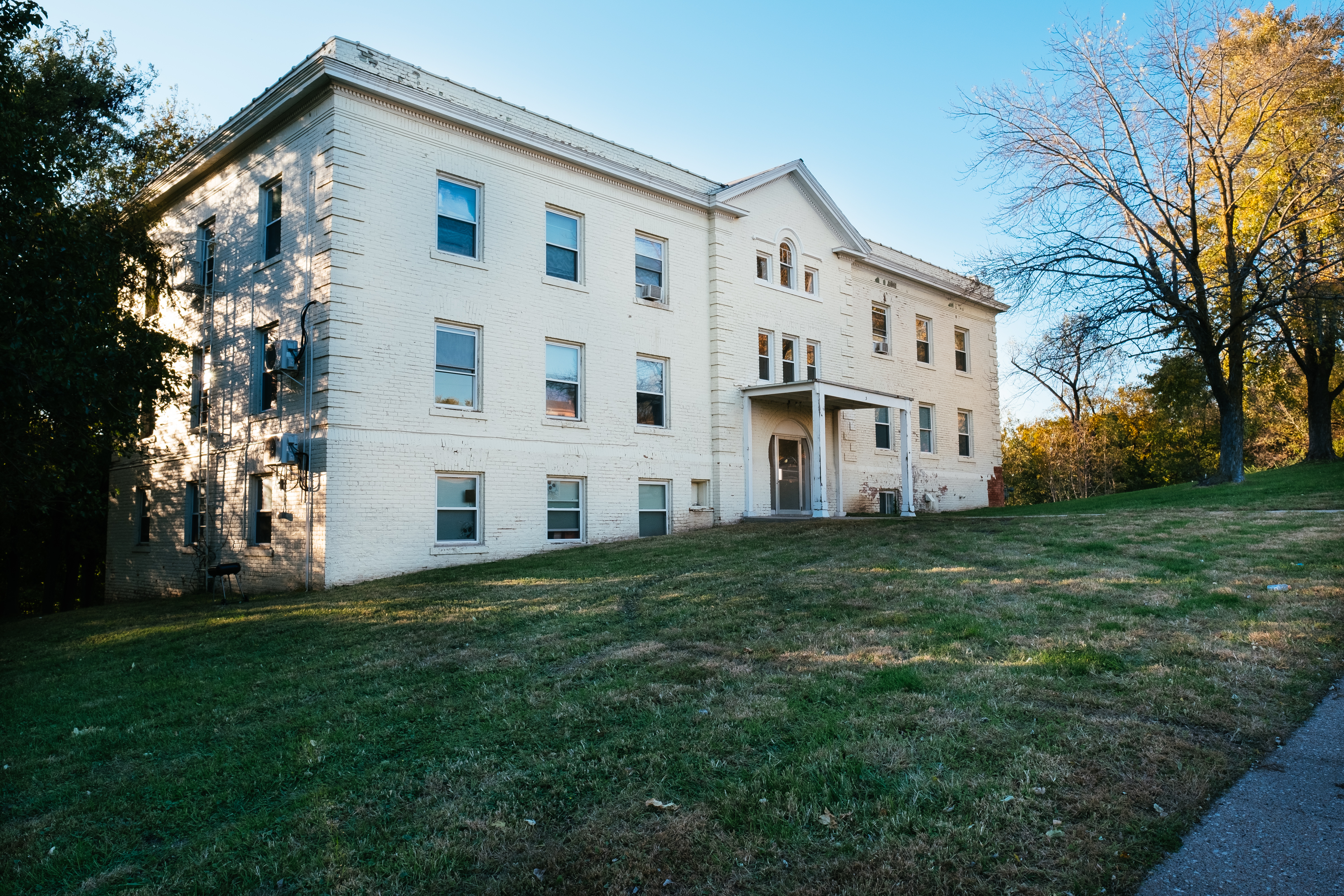
Dormitories

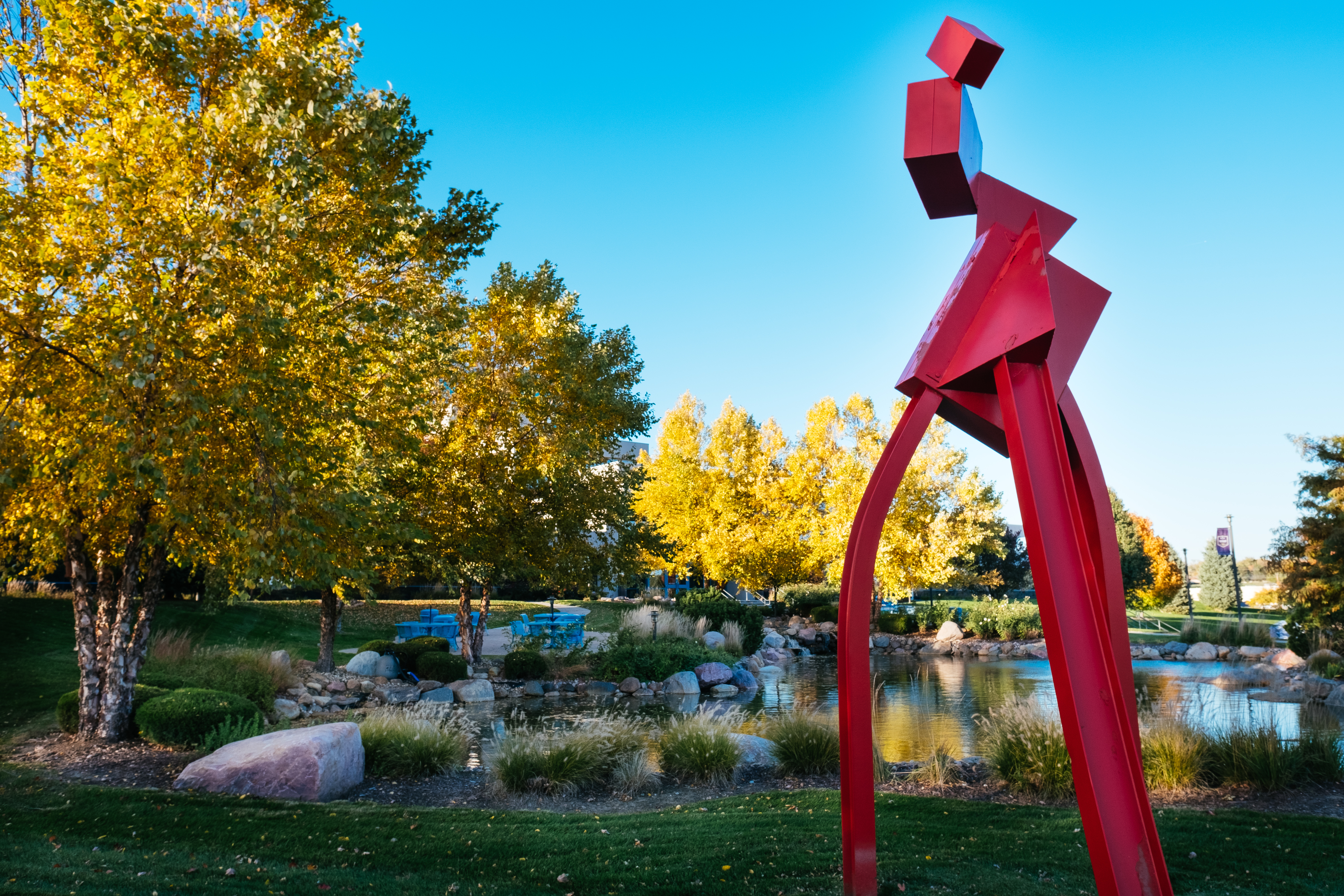
Sculpture and pond

== Athletics ==
The Bellevue athletic teams are called the Bruins. The university is a member of the National Association of Intercollegiate Athletics (NAIA), primarily competing in the North Star Athletic Association (NSAA) since the 2015–16 academic year. The Bruins previously competed in the defunct Midlands Collegiate Athletic Conference (MCAC) from 1994–95 to 2014–15 (when the conference dissolved).

Bellevue competes in 14 intercollegiate varsity sports: Men's sports include baseball, basketball, cross country, golf, soccer and track, while women's sports include basketball, cross country, golf, soccer, softball, track and volleyball; and co-ed sports include eSports.

=== Accomplishments ===
The Bellevue men's baseball team won the NAIA Baseball World Series in 1995. In 2011, Bellevue University added men's and women's golf teams. In 2016 Bellevue University started its first ever women's basketball program going 16–15 overall and 9–7 in conference play. In 2017, it added men's and women's cross country teams and the co-ed eSports team.

== Notable alumni ==
- T.J. Bohn, MLB player
- Shon Hopwood, former jailhouse lawyer and DC circuit law clerk; professor at Georgetown Law Center
- Abbie Cornett, former member of the Nebraska Legislature
- Judd H. Lyons, United States Army Major General, Adjutant General of the Nebraska National Guard and Deputy Director of the Army National Guard
- Beau McCoy, former member of the Nebraska Legislature
- Michael D. Navrkal, Army National Guard Brigadier General
- James R. Young, former president, chief executive office, and chairman for Union Pacific Railroad
- Pettus, Evan, Air Force Lt. Gen. Acting commander of U.S. Southern Command.
