= George Fenger =

American politician (1925–1993)

Member of the Nebraska Legislature from the 45th district
- In office January 7, 1981 – January 9, 1985
- Preceded by: Frank Lewis
- Succeeded by: Paul Hartnett

Personal details
- Born: February 15, 1925 Omaha, Nebraska
- Died: September 11, 1993 (aged 68) Bellevue, Nebraska
- Party: Republican
- Spouse: Jean Bennett (m. 1950)
- Children: 3 (Caroly, Caryn, George)
- Education: University of Nebraska–Lincoln
- Occupation: Service station owner-operator, real estate and marine sales

Military service
- Allegiance: United States
- Branch/service: United States Navy
- Years of service: 1943–1946

George Fenger (February 15, 1925 – September 11, 1993) was a Republican politician from Nebraska who served as a member of the Nebraska Legislature from the 45th district from 1981 to 1985.

== Early life ==
Fenger was born in Omaha, Nebraska, in 1925. He graduated from Omaha South High School in 1942 and attended the University of Nebraska–Lincoln, but did not graduate. He served in the U.S. Army in World War II from 1943 to 1946. Finger owned and operated several businesses, including a real estate firm, a marine sales business, and service stations.

In 1968, Fenger ran for the Sarpy County Board of Supervisors from the 3rd district. He lost to Norman Magnusson, the president of the Bellevue City Council, in the Republican primary.

Fenger challenged Sarpy County Sheriff Richard Whitted for re-election in the 1970 Republican primary. During the campaign, Whitted was charged with committing perjury when testifying before a federal grand jury, but he declined to drop out of the race. Whitted defeated Fender and policeman Richard Hertzig in the Republican primary, but Fenger continued his campaign in the general election as a write-in candidate, but placed sixth, behind Whitted, the Democratic nominee, an independent candidate, and two other write-in candidates.

He challenged Bellevue Mayor Robert Haworth for re-election in 1974 in the nonpartisan primary, but Haworth ultimately won.

== Nebraska Legislature ==
In 1980, Fenger ran against incumbent State Senator Frank Lewis, a Democrat, in the eastern Sarpy County-based 45th district. In the primary election, Lewis placed first by a wide margin, winning 60 percent of the vote to Fenger's 40 percent. They both advanced to the general election, where Fenger defeated Lewis, winning 54–46 percent.

Fenger ran for re-election in 1984, and was challenged by Paul Hartnett, a Creighton University professor, and Ralph Tate, a retired U.S. Air Force lieutenant colonel, both of whom were members of the Bellevue School Board. Hartnett placed first over Fenger in the primary election, receiving 42 percent of the vote to Fenger's 36 percent and Tate's 23 percent. Hartnett and Fenger advanced to the general election, where Hartnett narrowly won, receiving 52 percent of the vote to Fenger's 48 percent.

== Death ==
Finger died on September 11, 1993.
