= Henry C. Luckey =

American politician (1868–1956)

Henry Carl Luckey
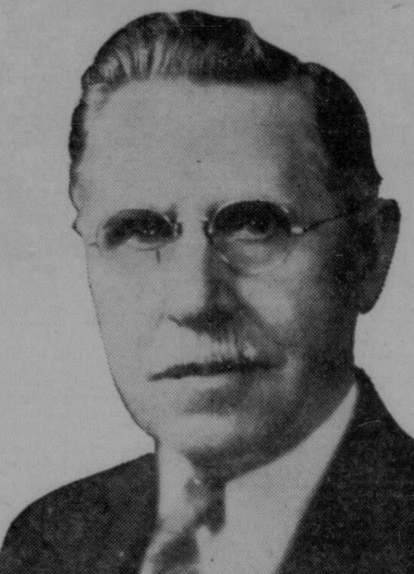
- Nebraska State Journal, November 8, 1938

Member of the U.S. House of Representatives from Nebraska's 1st district
- In office January 3, 1935 – January 3, 1939
- Preceded by: John H. Morehead
- Succeeded by: George H. Heinke

Personal details
- Born: November 22, 1868 East St. Louis, Illinois
- Died: December 31, 1956 (aged 88) El Cerrito, California
- Party: Democratic

Henry Carl Luckey (November 22, 1868 – December 31, 1956) was an American Democratic Party politician.

He was born on November 22, 1868, near East St. Louis, Illinois. In 1873 he moved to Nebraska settling on a farm with his parents near Columbus, Nebraska. He farmed there from 1894 to 1900. He moved to Lincoln, Nebraska and graduated from the University of Nebraska in 1912. He also passed the bar in 1912 and then pursued a postgraduate course at Columbia University in New York City in 1914 and 1915.

He was in the real estate and the construction business from 1917 to 1927, and a member of the board of trustees of Midland Lutheran College in Fremont, Nebraska from 1919 to 1925. He was elected to the Seventy-fourth United States Congress and reelected to the Seventy-fifth United States Congress. He ran twice more in 1938 for the Seventy-sixth United States Congress and in 1940 for the Seventy-seventh United States Congress, but failed to be reelected. He returned then to the real estate business and farming until 1946 when he retired to Richmond, California. He died on December 31, 1956, in El Cerrito, California and is buried there in Sunset View Cemetery.

U.S. House of Representatives
Preceded by John H. Morehead (D)	Member of the U.S. House of Representatives from Nebraska's 1st congressional district January 3, 1935 – January 3, 1939	Succeeded by George H. Heinke (R)
