= Laura Poppo =

American academic and a researcher (born 1962)

- Born: 1962 (age 63–64); Cleveland, Ohio
- Title: Donald and Shirley Clifton Chair in Leadership
- Awards: Dan and Mary Lou Schendel Best Paper Prize; The Warren L. Holtzman Outstanding Educator of the Year Award; Guy O. and Rosa Lee Mabry Research Fellow Award

Academic background
- Education: University of Pennsylvania; Dartmouth College

Academic work
- Discipline: Strategic Planning; Transaction Cost Economics
- Institutions: University of Nebraska–Lincoln (2017-present) University of Kansas (2007-2017) Virginia Tech (1996-2007) Washington University in St. Louis (1991-1996)

Laura Poppo (born 1962) is an American academic and a researcher who studies strategy and organizations. She holds the Donald and Shirley Clifton Chair in Leadership at the University of Nebraska–Lincoln.

== Career ==
During her Ph.D., Poppo served as teaching and research assistant at the Wharton School until 1991, after which she joined Washington University in St. Louis as an assistant professor and resident fellow at the Olin School of Business until 1996. Poppo joined Virginia Polytechnic Institute and State University as an assistant professor of organization and strategy in 1996. She was then promoted to associate professor there in 2003 and stayed until 2007. During this time, she also held visiting faculty positions at Tecnológico de Monterrey University and City University of Hong Kong.

In 2007, Poppo joined the school of business at University of Kansas as associate professor of strategic management and was promoted to professor in 2009. At the business school, she was Fred Ball Faculty Fellow from 2008 to 2011 and then held the Edmund P. Learned Professorship in Business from 2011 to 2017. In 2017, Poppo joined University of Nebraska–Lincoln as professor and Donald and Shirley Clifton Chair in Leadership.

=== Research and work ===
Poppo's early research built upon Oliver Williamson's theory of transaction cost economics. She is among the first to examine alternative explanations for how make-or-buy decisions influence firm performance and how trust and contracts function as complements versus substitutes in managing the performance of buyer-supplier exchanges.

In 2019, the Strategic Management Society recognized and awarded her paper with Todd Zenger, 'Do formal contracts and relational governance function as substitutes or complements?' the Dan and Mary Lou Schendel Best Paper Prize.

More broadly, Poppo's research examines how and when a firm's reliance on trust can help or hurt the exchange performance of its outsourced activities. It considers boundary constraints as well as alternative perspectives, including fairness, managerial ties, and different institutional contexts, such as China.

== Selected articles ==
- Poppo, L., & Zenger, T. (1998). Testing Alternative Theories of the Firm: Transaction Cost, Knowledge-Based, and Measurement Explanations for Make-or-Buy Decisions in Information Services. Strategic Management Journal, 19, 853-877.
- Poppo, L., & Zenger, T. (2002). Do Formal Contracts and Relational Governance Function as Substitutes or Complements? Strategic Management Journal, 23, 707-725.
- Li, J., Poppo, L., & Zhou, K. Z. (2008). Do Managerial Ties in China Always Produce Value? Competition, Uncertainty, and Domestic vs. Foreign Firms. Strategic Management Journal, 29, 383-400.
- Poppo, L., Zhou, K. Z., & Ryu, S. (2008). Alternative Origins to Inter-organizational Trust: An Interdependence Perspective on the Shadow of the Past and the Shadow of the Future. Organization Science, 19, 39-55.
- Li, J. J., Poppo, L., & Zhou, K. Z. (2010). Relational Mechanisms, Formal Contracts, and Local Knowledge Acquisition by International Subsidiaries. Strategic Management Journal, 31(4), 349-370.
- Zheng, K. Z., & Poppo, L. (2010). Exchange Hazards, Relational Reliability, and Contracts in China: The Contingent Role of Legal Enforceability. Journal of International Business Studies, 41(5), 861-882.
- Poppo, L., & Zhou, K. Z. (2014). Managing Contracts for Fairness in Buyer-Supplier Exchanges. Strategic Management Journal, 35(10), 1508-1527.
- Poppo, L., Zhou, K. Z., & Li, J. (2016). When Can You Trust "Trust"? Calculative Trust, Relational Trust, and Supplier Performance. Strategic Management Journal, 37(4), 724-741.
