= Abbie Cornett =

American politician

Member of the Nebraska Legislature from the 45th district
- In office 2005–2013
- Preceded by: Paul Hartnett
- Succeeded by: Sue Crawford

Personal details
- Born: August 22, 1966 (age 60) Omaha, Nebraska
- Party: Democratic (before 2006); Republican (since 2006)
- Education: University of Nebraska at Omaha, Bellevue University

Abbie Cornett (born August 22, 1966) is a politician from the U.S. state of Nebraska. She served two terms, from 2005 to 2013, as a member of the Nebraska Legislature.

== Personal life ==
Senator Abbie Cornett was born in Omaha, Nebraska. She graduated from the University of Nebraska at Omaha, and the Nebraska Law Enforcement Academy (1993). She served as a police officer with the City of Omaha for 10 years, before retiring after a service injury, later graduating with a degree in criminal justice from Bellevue University.

Cornett resides in Bellevue. She is a member of the Bellevue Chamber of Commerce, Altrusa, Optimist International, a retired-status member for the Nebraska Association of Women Police and the Fraternal Order of Police, and is a member of the Republican Party.

== Nebraska Legislature ==
Cornett was elected in 2004 to represent the 45th legislative district after finishing first in a five-person primary, and winning the general election with 60% of the 13,573 votes cast. In 2008, she ran for re-election unopposed.

Cornett chaired the Revenue committee (Chairperson), and sat on the Education Committee, the Committee on Committees, and the Developmental Disabilities Special Investigative Committee, formed in 2007.

In 2012, Cornett made headlines for introducing a tax package with the Governor of Nebraska Dave Heineman, changes in the Nebraska Advantage Act in order to attract data centers and a bill on behalf of the Attorney General Jon Bruning to strengthen law on negligent child abuse, among others.

On September 24, 2013, Cornett moved from state government to local government to begin her new job as city administrator for David City, Nebraska. She submitted her resignation as David City Administrator, citing personal reasons, in July 2014.
