= Paul Hartnett =

American politician (1927–2022)

Member of the Nebraska Legislature from the 45th district
- In office January 9, 1985 – January 5, 2005
- Preceded by: George Fenger
- Succeeded by: Abbie Cornett

Personal details
- Born: September 29, 1927 Sioux City, Iowa
- Died: June 26, 2022 (aged 94) Bellevue, Nebraska
- Party: Democratic
- Spouse: Marjorie Sheehan (m. 1951)
- Children: 5 (Debbie, Cindy, Marcy, Joan, Michael)
- Education: Wayne State College (B.A., M.S.); University of Nebraska–Lincoln (Ph.D.)
- Occupation: Professor, high school teacher, consultant

D. Paul Hartnett (September 29, 1927 – June 26, 2022) was a Democratic politician from Nebraska who served as a member of the Nebraska Legislature from the 45th district from 1985 to 2005.

Paul Hartnett was raised in Hubbard, Nebraska, on a family farm but left to attend Wayne State College where he pursued a bachelor's degree and a master's degree in education. While at Wayne State College, he met and married Marjorie Sheehan in 1951. Hartnett began his career as a teacher, coach, and administrator first at Brunswick, Nebraska, and then back in his hometown of Hubbard.

In 1958, Hartnett moved to Bellevue, Nebraska, to serve as an administrator in the Bellevue Public School District. While serving at Bellevue, he pursued a Doctor of Education from the University of Nebraska–Lincoln and in 1966 became a professor at Creighton University where he taught for 38 years until retiring in 2004. During this time, Hartnett was elected to the Bellevue School Board in 1968, a position which he held until 1984.

In 1984, Hartnett was elected to the Nebraska Legislature to represent District 45 in Bellevue. He was re-elected in 1988, 1992, 1996, and 2000 before deciding to retire and not seek re-election in 2004. Hartnett was known as the "driving force" behind the construction of the Kennedy Freeway through Bellevue, and he also worked to bring a national veterans cemetery to Sarpy County, Nebraska, and to expand the tourism tax authority to benefit more Nebraska communities.

Hartnett died aged 94 on June 26, 2022, in Bellevue.
