= List of lakes of Nebraska =

This is a list of lakes of Nebraska. Swimming, fishing, and/or boating are permitted in some of these lakes, but not all.

Name	Area	County	Notes
32-Mile H, Prairie Lake	65 acres (26 ha)	Adams	Walk-in access only. Owned by Little Blue NRD
Alda NDOT	12 acres (4.9 ha)	Hall	No Boats. Owned by Nebraska Department of Transportation
Alexandria SRA	43 acres (17 ha)	Jefferson	
Alfon C. Haring Memorial WMA Middle Lake	4.5 acres (1.8 ha)	Franklin	Walk-in access
Alliance City Golf Course Pond	.5 acres (0.20 ha)	Box Butte	Owned by City of Alliance. Public fishing access allowed sunrise to 9 a.m., Monday-Friday
Allure	200 acres (81 ha)	Saunders	North of City of Ashland
Ansley Lake	4 acres (1.6 ha)	Custer	Owned by Village of Ansley
Archway Lakes	30 acres (12 ha)	Buffalo	Four lakes. Managed by City of Kearney
Arnold Lake	8 acres (3.2 ha)	Custer	Managed by Village of Arnold
Arrowhead WMA	77 acres (31 ha)	Gage	
Ash Hollow State Park Pond	.6 acres (0.24 ha)	Garden	Located on Ash Hollow State Historical Park
Atkinson Dam	5 acres (2.0 ha)	Holt	Managed by City of Atkinson
Auble Pond	5 acres (2.0 ha)	Valley	Owned by City of Ord
Auburn Rotary Club Lake	5 acres (2.0 ha)	Nemaha	
Babcock	600 acres (240 ha)	Platte	Owned by Loup Power District
Bader Memorial County Park	12 acres (4.9 ha)	Merrick	Seven lakes. Owned by Merrick County
Ballards Marsh WMA	250 acres (100 ha)	Cherry	Primitive boat ramp located on NW side of lake
Baright Lake	4 acres (1.6 ha)	Cass	Located at Eugene T. Mahoney State Park
Barnett Park Pond	5 acres (2.0 ha)	Red Willow	Managed by the City of McCook
Bassett City Ponds	4 acres (1.6 ha)	Rock	Two ponds
Bassway Strip WMA	39 acres (16 ha)	Buffalo	Two lakes
Bear Pierce Cedar 2A	24 acres (9.7 ha)	Gage	Owned by the Lower Big Blue NRD
Beaver	300 acres (120 ha)	Cass	Private lake near City of Plattsmouth
Bennington	270 acres (110 ha)	Douglas	Private lake with limited public access near City of Bennington.
Benson Park Pond	4 acres (1.6 ha)	Douglas	Owned by City of Omaha
Bessey Fish Pond	3 acres (1.2 ha)	Thomas	Located on the Nebraska National Forest at Village of Halsey
Bethphage Pond	3 acres (1.2 ha)	Kearney	
Big Alkali WMA	842 acres (341 ha)	Cherry	Boat Ramp, Camping, Fish-Cleaning Station, Restroom
Big Elk Recreation Area	13 acres (5.3 ha)	Sarpy	Managed by the City of Papillion
Big Indian Recreation Area	76 acres (31 ha)	Gage	South of Wymore
Big Springs City Pond	.5 acres (0.20 ha)	Deuel	
Birdwood WMA	20 acres (8.1 ha)	Lincoln	Rainbow Trout stocked seasonally
Blue	311 acres (126 ha)	Garden	North of Oshkosh
Blue Hole WMA	37 acres (15 ha)	Buffalo	Connects to Platte River
Bluestem	325 acres (132 ha)	Lancaster	Near City of Crete
Bluewater	250 acres (100 ha)	Douglas	Private lake near City of Valley
Boardgate Reservoir	12 acres (4.9 ha)	Dawes	Located on Oglala National Grassland
Bowling Lake	12 acres (4.9 ha)	Lancaster	Located in northwest City of Lincoln, across the road on northwest 48th St from Arnold Elementary School
Bowman Lake	10 acres (4.0 ha)	Sherman	Owned by Sherman County
Bowwood WMA	6 acres (2.4 ha)	Pawnee	
Box Butte Reservoir	1,600 acres (650 ha)	Dawes	Southeast of Crawford
Brady Rest Area Westbound	5 acres (2.0 ha)	Lincoln	No boats allowed
Brady WMA	25 acres (10 ha)	Lincoln	
Branched Oak State Recreation Area	1,800 acres (730 ha)	Lancaster	Near Malcolm
Bridgeport City Pond	1.25 acres (0.51 ha)	Morrill	Special City Regulations
Bridgeport SRA, Center	78 acres (32 ha)	Morrill	5 lakes near Bridgeport
Bruning Dam	258 acres (104 ha)	Fillmore	Owned by Little Blue NRD
Buckley 3F	22 acres (8.9 ha)	Jefferson	Owned by Little Blue NRD
Buckskin Hills WMA	75 acres (30 ha)	Dixon	Near Newcastle
Bufflehead WMA	15 acres (6.1 ha)	Hall	
Burchard	150 acres (61 ha)	Pawnee	East of Beatrice
Burwell Lake (Lady Bird)	3 acres (1.2 ha)	Garfield	
Calamus Reservoir	5,200 acres (2,100 ha)	Garfield and Loup	Near Burwell
Carney Pond	3 acres (1.2 ha)	Holt	Rainbow Trout Stocked seasonally
Carter Lake	300 acres (120 ha)	Douglas	Shared with Iowa
Central City Lake	5 acres (2.0 ha)	Merrick	Owned by City of Central City
Century Link Lake	10 acres (4.0 ha)	Cass	Located at Eugene T. Mahoney State Park
Chadron City Reservoirs	20 acres (8.1 ha)	Dawes	Two ponds. Owned by City of Chadron.
Chadron State Park Pond	1.25 acres (0.51 ha)	Dawes	Located at Chadron State Park
Chalkrock Lake WMA	44 acres (18 ha)	Cedar	
Champion Mill Lake	12 acres (4.9 ha)	Chase	
Chappell Interstate Lake	30 acres (12 ha)	Deuel	
Cherry Creek Diversion Pond	0.25 acres (0.10 ha)	Dawes	Located on Fort Robinson State Park
Cherry Creek Pond	2 acres (0.81 ha)	Dawes	Located on Fort Robinson State Park
Chester Island WMA	5.6 acres (2.3 ha)	Lincoln	Seven lakes
Cheyenne SRA	16 acres (6.5 ha)	Hall	Gravel boat ramp
Clatonia 3A	46 acres (19 ha)	Gage	Owned by Lower Big Blue NRD
Clear	425 acres (172 ha)	Cherry	At Valentine National Wildlife Refuge
Clear	195 acres (79 ha)	Brown	South of Ainsworth
Cody Park Pond East	1.2 acres (0.49 ha)	Lincoln	Managed by the City of North Platte
Columbus Hospital Pond	11 acres (4.5 ha)	Platte	Accessible deck
Conestoga	230 acres (93 ha)	Lancaster	Near Emerald
Coot Shallows WMA	12 acres (4.9 ha)	Buffalo	
Cornhusker WMA	1 acre (0.40 ha)	Hall	
Cottonmill Lake	43 acres (17 ha)	Buffalo	Owned by the City of Kearney
Cottontail	29 acres (12 ha)	Lancaster	Owned by Lower Platte South NRD
Cottonwood	250 acres (100 ha)	Cedar	Below Gavins Point Dam, shared with South Dakota
Cottonwood Lake SRA	34 acres (14 ha)	Cherry	Near Merriman
Cottonwood-Steverson Lake	680 acres (280 ha)	Cherry	South of Merriman
Cozad Lake	80 acres (32 ha)	Brown	Also known as South Pine WMA
Cozad WMA	18 acres (7.3 ha)	Dawson	
Crane Lake	128 acres (52 ha)	Garden	
Crazy Horse Pond	2 acres (0.81 ha)	Sioux	Walk-in Access. Located on Fort Robinson State Park
Crescent WMA	982 acres (397 ha)	Garden	20 mi north of Oshkosh
Crystal Cove Lake	30 acres (12 ha)	Dakota	Accessible Pier. Rainbow Trout stocked seasonally
Crystal Lake	5 acres (2.0 ha)	Adams	Managed by the Village of Ayr
Crystal Lake	7 acres (2.8 ha)	Lincoln	
Crystal Springs Lakes	6 acres (2.4 ha)	Jefferson	Two lakes
Cub Creek Lake	27 acres (11 ha)	Keya Paha	Owned by Middle Niobrara Natural Resource District
Cub Creek Watershed 12A	27 acres (11 ha)	Jefferson	Owned by Lower Big Blue NRD
Curtis Golf Course Pond	1.7 acres (0.69 ha)	Frontier	Rainbow Trout stocked seasonally
Czechland Lake	85 acres (34 ha)	Saunders	Owned by Lower Platte North NRD
Darr WMA	13 acres (5.3 ha)	Dawson	Gravel boat ramp
David City Park Ponds	6 acres (2.4 ha)	Butler	Three ponds
Davis Creek Reservoir	1,145 acres (463 ha)	Valley	Managed by Lower Loup NRD
Dead Timber SRA	20 acres (8.1 ha)	Dodge	No boat ramp
Defair Lake WMA	70 acres (28 ha)	Grant	Gravel boat ramp
DeSoto National Wildlife Refuge	760 acres (310 ha)	Washington	Shared with Iowa
Dewey Lake	550 acres (220 ha)	Cherry	Gravel Boat Ramp
Diamond Lake WMA	26 acres (11 ha)	Gage	
Dogwood WMA	12 acres (4.9 ha)	Dawson	Two lakes. East lake has a boat ramp
Donald Whitney WMA	17 acres (6.9 ha)	Gage	
Duck Creek Recreation Area	65 acres (26 ha)	Nemaha	Owned by Nemaha NRD
Duck Lake	66 acres (27 ha)	Cherry	Gravel Boat Ramp
Eagle Scout Lake	55 acres (22 ha)	Hall	Owned by the City of Grand Island
East Gothenburg WMA	15 acres (6.1 ha)	Dawson	Articulated mat concrete boat ramp
East Hershey WMA	20 acres (8.1 ha)	Lincoln	
East Hyannis Lake	120 acres (49 ha)	Grant	
East Odessa WMA	7 acres (2.8 ha)	Buffalo	
East Sutherland WMA	27 acres (11 ha)	Lincoln	Gravel boat ramp
Elwood	1,150 acres (470 ha)	Gosper	South of Lexington
Enders Reservoir State Recreation Area	1,200 acres (490 ha)	Chase	Near Imperial
Enders	100 acres (40 ha)	Brown	South of Ainsworth
Ericson	70 acres (28 ha)	Wheeler	
Farwell South Reservoir	40 acres (16 ha)	Howard	Owned by Farwell Irrigation District
Flanagan	220 acres (89 ha)	Douglas	168th and Fort St
Flatwater	87 acres (35 ha)	Douglas	Private lake near Valley
Fontenelle Park Pond	4 acres (1.6 ha)	Douglas	Owned by the City of Omaha
Forest City Recreation Area	15 acres (6.1 ha)	Sarpy	Managed by the City of Gretna
Fort Kearney SRA	21 acres (8.5 ha)	Kearney	Seven ponds
Fort McPherson	30 acres (12 ha)	Lincoln	Area owned by the Nebraska Department of Transportation
Fremont Lakes	285 acres (115 ha)	Dodge	17 lakes near Fremont
Fremont Slough WMA	30 acres (12 ha)	Lincoln County	
Frenchman WMA	20 acres (8.1 ha)	Hayes	Three lakes
Friend City Lake	1 acre (0.40 ha)	Saline	
Frye Lake WMA	243 acres (98 ha)	Grant	
Gallagher Canyon	182 acres (74 ha)	Dawson	10 mi west of Elwood
Geneva Boys Pond	1 acre (0.40 ha)	Fillmore	Managed by Geneva
Gilbert-Baker WMA Pond	2 acres (0.81 ha)	Sioux	Fishing Pier Present. Located on the east portion of Gilbert-Baker WMA
Ginger Cove	86 acres (35 ha)	Douglas	Private lake near Valley
Glenn Cunningham	390 acres (160 ha)	Douglas	North central Omaha
Goldeneye	17 acres (6.9 ha)	Deuel	Managed by South Platte NRD
Goose	237 acres (96 ha)	Holt	South of O'Neill
Grable Ponds	6 acres (2.4 ha)	Dawes	In two ponds. Located on Fort Robinson State Park
Gracie Creek Pond	2 acres (0.81 ha)	Loup	Located at upper end of Calamus State Recreation Area
Grand Island Eastbound Rest Area	6 acres (2.4 ha)	Hall	Owned by Nebraska Department of Transportation
Grand Island L.E. Ray Lake	30 acres (12 ha)	Hall	Owned by the City of Grand Island
Grand Island Pier Lake	9 acres (3.6 ha)	Hall	Owned by the City of Grand Island
Grand Island Sucks Lake	4 acres (1.6 ha)	Hall	Owned by the City of Grand Island
Gretna Crossing Pond	2 acres (0.81 ha)	Sarpy	Owned by City of Gretna
Grove	50 acres (20 ha)	Antelope	Near Royal
Grove Sand pit	1 acre (0.40 ha)	Antelope	Near Royal
Hackberry Lake	680 acres (280 ha)	Cherry	
Lake Halleck	4 acres (1.6 ha)	Sarpy	
Hanscom Park Pond	1 acre (0.40 ha)	Douglas	
Harlan County	13,500	Harlan	Near Alma
Lake Hastings	63 acres (25 ha)	Adams	Owned by City of Hastings
Hayes Center Lake WMA	50 acres (20 ha)	Hayes	
Heartland Shooting Center Pond	7 acres (2.8 ha)	Hall	Open during open shooting hours
Heartwell Park Lake	3 acres (1.2 ha)	Adams	Owned by the City of Hastings
Lake Helen	20 acres (8.1 ha)	Dawson	Owned by City of Gothenburg
Hershey WMA	53 acres (21 ha)	Lincoln	
Holdrege City Lake	10 acres (4.0 ha)	Phelps	Also known as North Park. Owned by the City of Holdrege
Holmes Lake	100 acres (40 ha)	Lancaster	Owned by City of Lincoln
Homestead Lake	38 acres (15 ha)	Butler	Owned by Lower Platte North NRD
Home Valley Lake	220 acres (89 ha)	Cherry	Located on Cottonwood Steverson WMA. Access via portage route from Cottonwood-Steverson Lake.
Hooper City Lake	4 acres (1.6 ha)	Dodge	
Hull Lake WMA	6 acres (2.4 ha)	Boyd	
Humboldt City Park Lake East	1 acre (0.40 ha)	Richardson	
Humboldt City Park Lake West	1 acre (0.40 ha)	Richardson	
Humphrey Pond	3 acres (1.2 ha)	Keith	No boats allowed
Ice House Ponds	6 acres (2.4 ha)	Dawes	Three ponds. Located on Fort Robinson State Park
Independence Landing Lake	2 acres (0.81 ha)	Seward	Owned by the City of Seward
Indian Creek WMA Pond	2 acres (0.81 ha)	Webster	
Iron Horse Trail	85 acres (34 ha)	Pawnee	Near DuBois. Owned by Nemaha NRD
Island Lake	711 acres (288 ha)	Garden	
Jeffrey Reservoir	900 acres (360 ha)	Lincoln	South of Brady
Jenny Newmann Pond	4 acres (1.6 ha)	Cass	Located at Platte River State Park
Johnson Park Lake	10 acres (4.0 ha)	Dodge	Paved boat ramp
Johnson SRA	2,189 acres (886 ha)	Gosper	Near Lexington
Kea Lake WMA	20 acres (8.1 ha)	Buffalo	Managed by the City of Kearney
Kea West WMA	8 acres (3.2 ha)	Buffalo	
Keller Park SRA	7 acres (2.8 ha)	Brown	Five Ponds. Ponds four and five stocked with rainbow trout seasonally
Killdeer Lake WMA	20 acres (8.1 ha)	Lancaster	
Kirkman's Cove	160 acres (65 ha)	Richardson	Near Humboldt
Kirkpatrick Memorial Park Lake	3 acres (1.2 ha)	Dawson	Owned by City of Lexington
Kramer Park Lake	7 acres (2.8 ha)	Sarpy	
Kramper Lake (Danish Alps SRA)	200 acres (81 ha)	Dakota	
Laing Lake	10 acres (4.0 ha)	Box Butte	Owned by City of Alliance. Rainbow Trout stocked seasonally
Lakeview Park Lake	4 acres (1.6 ha)	York	Also known as Henderson Pond
Lawrence Youngman Lake	60 acres (24 ha)	Douglas	Operated by City of Omaha
Lee Rupp WMA	7 acres (2.8 ha)	Platte	Two lakes
Leigh Tri-county	7 acres (2.8 ha)	Colfax	Additional city regulations enforced
Leisure Lake	25 acres (10 ha)	Jefferson	Owned by Lower Big Blue NRD
Lewis and Clark	31,400 acres (12,700 ha)	Cedar and Knox	Missouri River reservoir; Nebraska's largest lake; it is shared with South Dakota.
Liberty Cove	36 acres (15 ha)	Webster	Owned by Little Blue NRD
Lincoln Park Pond	1 acre (0.40 ha)	Nuckolls	Owned by City of Superior
Lindsay Park Pond	3.6 acres (1.5 ha)	Platte	
Lone Star Recreation Area	75 acres (30 ha)	Fillmore	Owned by Little Blue NRD
Long	155 acres (63 ha)	Brown	South of Ainsworth
Lord Lake	15 acres (6.1 ha)	Cherry	Located on McKelvie National Forest
Louisville State Recreation Area	40 acres (16 ha)	Cass	Five lakes
Lyons City Lake	5 acres (2.0 ha)	Burt	
Mad Bear Recreation Area	17 acres (6.9 ha)	Sarpy	Managed by the City of Gretna
Mallard Landing	90 acres (36 ha)	Douglas	Private lake near Valley
Lake Maloney	1,600 acres (650 ha)	Lincoln	South of North Platte
Maple Creek Reservoir (Leigh Lake)	154 acres (62 ha)	Platte	Owned by Lower Elkhorn NRD
Marsh Wren WMA	1 acre (0.40 ha)	Howard	
Maskenthine	98 acres (40 ha)	Stanton	North of Stanton
Mayberry WMA	25 acres (10 ha)	Pawnee	Walk-in access
McConaughy	30,500 acres (12,300 ha)	Keith	Near Ogallala; Largest lake entirely within Nebraska
Meadowlark	55 acres (22 ha)	Seward	Owned by Lower Platte South NRD
Medicine Creek	1,850 acres (750 ha)	Frontier	Near Cambridge
Melham Park Lake	4 acres (1.6 ha)	Custer	Owned by City of Broken Bow
Memphis Lake State Recreation Area	81 acres (33 ha)	Saunders	
Merganser Lake	41 acres (17 ha)	Lancaster	Owned by Lower Platte South NRD
Merritt Reservoir	2,900 acres (1,200 ha)	Cherry	Near Valentine
Midlands Lake	11 acres (4.5 ha)	Douglas	
Midway Canyon Reservoir	609 acres (246 ha)	Dawson	South of Cozad
Lake Minatare	2,100 acres (850 ha)	Scotts Bluff	Northeast of Scottsbluff
Minden Biological Learning Pond	.5 acres (0.20 ha)	Kearney	
Minden Community Pond	2 acres (0.81 ha)	Kearney	Owned by City of Minden
Mormon Island DOT (East)	22 acres (8.9 ha)	Hall	Access on foot from Mormon Island State Recreation Area
Mormon Island State Recreation Area (Middle)	19 acres (7.7 ha)	Hall	Concrete boat ramp
Mormon Island State Recreation Area (West)	42 acres (17 ha)	Hall	Concrete boat ramp
Mormon Trail	1 acre (0.40 ha)	Merrick	
Morrill Sandpits	25 acres (10 ha)	Scotts Bluff	Three lakes. Owned by Scotts Bluff and managed by City of Morrill
Mud Lake		Cherry	Northwest of Mullen
Mudd Lake		Logan	South of Nebraska National Forest
Neligh Park (West Point Park Pond)	5 acres (2.0 ha)	Cuming	Rainbow Trout stocked seasonally
Nick Lyman WMA	160 acres (65 ha)	Rock	In two lakes. Near Bassett
Niobrara State Park Pond	7 acres (2.8 ha)	Knox	In two lakes
Lake North	200 acres (81 ha)	Platte	
North Commons Pond	4.4 acres (1.8 ha)	Adams	Owned by City of Hastings
North Kearney Rest Area (westbound) NDOT	7 acres (2.8 ha)	Buffalo	Owned by Nebraska Department of Transportation
North Loup SRA	7 acres (2.8 ha)	Howard	
North Platte I-80 Lake	26 acres (11 ha)	Lincoln	Managed by the City of North Platte
Oak Lake	47 acres (19 ha)	Lancaster	Three lakes. Owned by the City of Lincoln
Olive Creek	175 acres (71 ha)	Lancaster	Near Kramer
Oliver Reservoir	270 acres (110 ha)	Kimball	West of Kimball
Lake Ogallala	650 acres (260 ha)	Keith	Near Ogallala
Osage WMA	4 acres (1.6 ha)	Johnson	Four Ponds
Overland Trail Lake	14 acres (5.7 ha)	York	Owned by Upper Big Blue NRD
Oxbow Trail Lake	43 acres (17 ha)	Butler	Owned by Upper Big Blue NRD
Oxford City Lake	2 acres (0.81 ha)	Furnas	
Papio D-4	30 acres (12 ha)	Douglas	Owned by Papio/Missouri NRD. Walk-in access
Patriot Park Lake	1.3 acres (0.53 ha)	Dawson	Owned by the City of Lexington
Pawnee City Pond	1 acre (0.40 ha)	Pawnee	
Pawnee Prairie WMA	5 acres (2.0 ha)	Pawnee	Seven Ponds. Walk-in access
Pawnee Slough WMA	30 acres (12 ha)	Lincoln	Area owned by Nebraska Department of Transportation. Gravel boat ramp
Pawnee State Recreation Area	740 acres (300 ha)	Lancaster	Near Emerald
Pawnee Park East	5 acres (2.0 ha)	Platte	Special city regulations in place
Pawnee Park West	2 acres (0.81 ha)	Platte	Special city regulations in place. Rainbow Trout stocked seasonally
Pelican	798 acres (323 ha)	Cherry	Located on Valentine National Wildlife Refuge
Penn Park Lake	8 acres (3.2 ha)	Antelope	Special city regulations in place
Peterson Lake WMA	60 acres (24 ha)	Rock	
Phillips Canyon Reservoir	142 acres (57 ha)	Gosper	
Pibel Lake	20 acres (8.1 ha)	Wheeler	Owned by Lower Loup NRD
Pierce City Lake	12 acres (4.9 ha)	Pierce	Additional city regulations in place
Pioneer Trails Lake	45 acres (18 ha)	Hamilton	Owned by the Upper Big Blue NRD
Plattsmouth City Lake	3 acres (1.2 ha)	Cass	
Plum Creek	252 acres (102 ha)	Dawson	Near Cozad
Plum Creek Park Lake	3 acres (1.2 ha)	Dawson	Owned by the City of Lexington
Plum Creek Valley WMA	1 acre (0.40 ha)	Brown	Also known as Sand Springs Pond
Ponca State Park Pond	1 acre (0.40 ha)	Dixon	Rainbow Trout stocked seasonally
Portal Recreation Area	35 acres (14 ha)	Sarpy	Owned by City of Papillion
Powder Creek Reservoir WMA	107 acres (43 ha)	Dixon	
Prairie Knoll WMA	6 acres (2.4 ha)	Pawnee	
Prairie Queen Recreation Area	135 acres (55 ha)	Sarpy	Managed by the City of Papillion
Prairie View Lake	42 acres (17 ha)	Douglas	Owned by Papio/Missouri NRD
Pressey WMA	2 acres (0.81 ha)	Custer	Gravel boat ramp
Rat and Beaver	500 acres (200 ha)	Cherry	Two Lakes. South of Ainsworth
Ravenna Lake	16 acres (6.5 ha)	Buffalo	Owned By Buffalo County
Recharge Lake	49 acres (20 ha)	York	Owned by Upper Big Blue NRD
Red Cedar	50 acres (20 ha)	Saunders	Owned by Lower Platte South NRD
Red Fox WMA	25 acres (10 ha)	Stanton	Primitive boat ramp
Redtail WMA	17 acres (6.9 ha)	Butler	Walk-in access
Red Willow/Hugh Butler	1,630 acres (660 ha)	Frontier	North of McCook
Rice Lake	47 acres (19 ha)	Cherry	Parking by Duck Lake and foot access only. Located on Valentine National Wildlife Refuge
Rock Creek Lake State Recreation Area	50 acres (20 ha)	Dundy	Rainbow Trout stocked seasonally
Rockford Lake State Recreation Area	150 acres (61 ha)	Gage	East of Beatrice
Sac Wilcox WMA	1 acre (0.40 ha)	Phelps	
Salt Valley Lakes		Lancaster	20+ lakes around Lincoln
Sandy and Big Sandy	200 acres (81 ha)	Saunders	North of Ashland
Sandy Channel State Recreation Area	52 acres (21 ha)	Buffalo	Six lakes
Schuyler City Lakes	11.5 acres (4.7 ha)	Colfax	In two lakes
Schwer Park Pond	2 acres (0.81 ha)	Sarpy	
Scottsbluff Riverside Park West Sandpit	15 acres (6.1 ha)	Scotts Bluff	Owned by City of Scottsbluff
Scottsbluff Zoo Pond	10 acres (4.0 ha)	Scottsbluff	Owned by City of Scottsbluff
Shadow Lake	30 acres (12 ha)	Douglas	
Shell Lake WMA	160 acres (65 ha)	Cherry	
Sherman Reservoir	2,845 acres (1,151 ha)	Sherman	Near Loup City
Sidney Legion Park Pond	1.75 acres (0.71 ha)	Cheyenne	Owned by City of Sidney
Silver Creek Pond	4 acres (1.6 ha)	Merrick	Owned by the Village of Silver Creek
Skyview Lake	50 acres (20 ha)	Madison	Located in Norfolk
Smith Creek	21 acres (8.5 ha)	Seward	Owned by Upper Big Blue NRD
Smith WMA	290 acres (120 ha)	Sheridan	
Smith	225 acres (91 ha)	Garden	Crescent northwest Gordon
Sock Pond	20 acres (8.1 ha)	Platte	Special city regulations in place
South Kearney Rest Area (eastbound) NDOT	1 acre (0.40 ha)	Buffalo	Owned by Nebraska Department of Transportation
Spaulding	24 acres (9.7 ha)	Greeley	
Spencer City Pond	9 acres (3.6 ha)	Boyd	
Spring Lake Park Pond	2 acres (0.81 ha)	Douglas	Owned by the City of Omaha
Stagecoach Lake State Recreation Area	195 acres (79 ha)	Lancaster	Near Hickman
Standing Bear	135 acres (55 ha)	Douglas	Owned by the City of Omaha
Stanton Lake	2 acres (0.81 ha)	Richardson	
Steinhart Park Ponds	5 acres (2.0 ha)	Otoe	Two ponds
Steverson-Cottonwood	680 acres (280 ha)	Cherry	North of Hyannis
Summit	190 acres (77 ha)	Burt	Near Tekamah
Sutherland Cooling Pond	220 acres (89 ha)	Lincoln	No boats and no wading
Sutherland Reservoir	3,017 acres (1,221 ha)	Lincoln	East of Paxton
Sutton Clark Pond	1 acre (0.40 ha)	Clay	Owned by City of Sutton
Sutton Detention Pond	1 acre (0.40 ha)	Clay	Owned by City of Sutton
Sutton Schwab Pond	1 acre (0.40 ha)	Clay	Owned by City of Sutton
Swan	235 acres (95 ha)	Holt	South of Atkinson
Swan Creek 2A WMA	16 acres (6.5 ha)	Saline	
Swanson Reservoir	5,000 acres (2,000 ha)	Hitchcock	West of McCook
Swanton WMA	39 acres (16 ha)	Saline	Owned by Lower Big Blue NRD
Ta-Ha-Zouka Park Lake	5 acres (2.0 ha)	Madison	Rainbow Trout stocked seasonally
Talmage Park Lake	1 acre (0.40 ha)	Otoe	
Tanglewood	33 acres (13 ha)	Lancaster	Owned by Lower Platte South NRD
Teal Lake WMA	29 acres (12 ha)	Lancaster	
Tecumseh City Pond	2 acres (0.81 ha)	Johnson	
Terry's Pit	7 acres (2.8 ha)	Scotts Bluff	Owned by City of Terrytown
Tilden City Pond	1 acre (0.40 ha)	Antelope	Additional city regulations
Timber Point	28 acres (11 ha)	Butler	
Tower Lake	75 acres (30 ha)	Brown	Owned by FWS
Towl Park Pond	1 acre (0.40 ha)	Douglas	
Twin Lakes	300 acres (120 ha)	Sheridan	South of Gordon
Twin Lakes WMA	270 acres (110 ha)	Seward	
Twin Oaks WMA	2 acres (0.81 ha)	Johnson	
Two Rivers State Recreation Area	32 acres (13 ha)	Douglas	Seven Lakes
Union Pacific SRA	15 acres (6.1 ha)	Buffalo	Gravel boat ramp
Valentine Fish Hatchery Reservoir	11 acres (4.5 ha)	Cherry	
Valentine Mill Pond	20 acres (8.1 ha)	Cherry	Owned by City of Valentine
Verdon Lake State Recreation Area	30 acres (12 ha)	Richardson	
Victoria Springs Lake SRA	6 acres (2.4 ha)	Custer	
Wagon Train State Recreation Area	315 acres (127 ha)	Lancaster	Near Hickman
Walgren SRA	100 acres (40 ha)	Sheridan	Near Hays Springs
Walnut Creek 2A	26 acres (11 ha)	Saline	Owned by Lower Big Blue NRD
Walnut Creek Reservoir	105 acres (42 ha)	Sarpy	Owned by the City of Papillion
Walnut Grove Park Pond	1 acre (0.40 ha)	Douglas	
Lake Wanahoo	662 acres (268 ha)	Saunders	North of Wahoo
War Axe State Recreation Area	14 acres (5.7 ha)	Buffalo	Gravel boat ramp
Watts Lake	230 acres (93 ha)	Cherry	On Valentine National Wildlife Refuge
Wayne City Pond	4 acres (1.6 ha)	Wayne	Owned by City of Wayne
Weeping Water Pond	4 acres (1.6 ha)	Sarpy	
Wehrspann Lake Recreation Area	245 acres (99 ha)	Sarpy	Southwest Omaha. Owned by Papio/Missouri River NRD
Wellfleet Lake	50 acres (20 ha)	Lincoln	Owned by Middle Republican NRD
West Brady WMA	6 acres (2.4 ha)	Lincoln	
West Cozad WMA	18 acres (7.3 ha)	Dawson	
West Gothenburg WMA	15 acres (6.1 ha)	Lincoln	
West Long Lake	62 acres (25 ha)	Cherry	Located on Valentine National Wildlife Refuge
West Maxwell WMA	7 acres (2.8 ha)	Lincoln	
West Shores	206 acres (83 ha)	Douglas	Private lake near Waterloo
Whitehawk Lake	30 acres (12 ha)	Douglas	Walk-in access
Whitney	900 acres (360 ha)	Dawes	
Wilber Reservoir No.1	2.6 acres (1.1 ha)	Saline	
Wild Plum	16 acres (6.5 ha)	Lancaster	Owned by Lower Platte South NRD
Wildwood Lake WMA	103 acres (42 ha)	Lancaster	Owned by Lower Platte South NRD
Wilkinson WMA	1 acre (0.40 ha)	Platte	In two ponds
Willard L. Meyer Recreation Area	95 acres (38 ha)	Saline	Also known as Swan Creek 5A. Owned by the Lower Big Blue NRD
Willow Creek Reservoir	700 acres (280 ha)	Pierce	Northwest of Norfolk
Willow Island WMA	24 acres (9.7 ha)	Dawson	Sand boat ramp
Willow Lake	353 acres (143 ha)	Cherry	Located on Valentine National Wildlife Refuge
Willow WMA	380 acres (150 ha)	Brown	South of Ainsworth
Wilson Creek 2X WMA	15 acres (6.1 ha)	Otoe	Owned by Nemaha NRD
Wilson Creek 4F (Prairie Owl)	38 acres (15 ha)	Otoe	Owned by Nemaha NRD
Windmill SRA	23 acres (9.3 ha)	Buffalo	Six lakes
Wirth Brothers Lake	36 acres (15 ha)	Johnson	Owned by the Nemaha NRD
Lake Winters Creek	235 acres (95 ha)	Scotts Bluff	
Wolbach City Pond	5 acres (2.0 ha)	Greeley	Owned by the Village of Wolbach
Wolf Wildcat No.12	42 acres (17 ha)	Gage	Owned by Lower Big Blue NRD
Wood Reserve Ponds	2 acres (0.81 ha)	Dawes	Four ponds. Located in Soldier Creek Wilderness Area
Wood River West WMA	15 acres (6.1 ha)	Hall	Gravel boat ramp
Yankee Hill Lake WMA	208 acres (84 ha)	Lancaster	
Yanney Park Lake	20 acres (8.1 ha)	Buffalo	Owned by City of Kearney
Zorinsky Lake	255 acres (103 ha)	Douglas	Owned by the City of Omaha

== See also ==
- List of lakes in the United States
- List of Nebraska rivers
