= Carns State Aid Bridge =

Historic bridge in Nebraska, US

- U.S. National Register of Historic Places
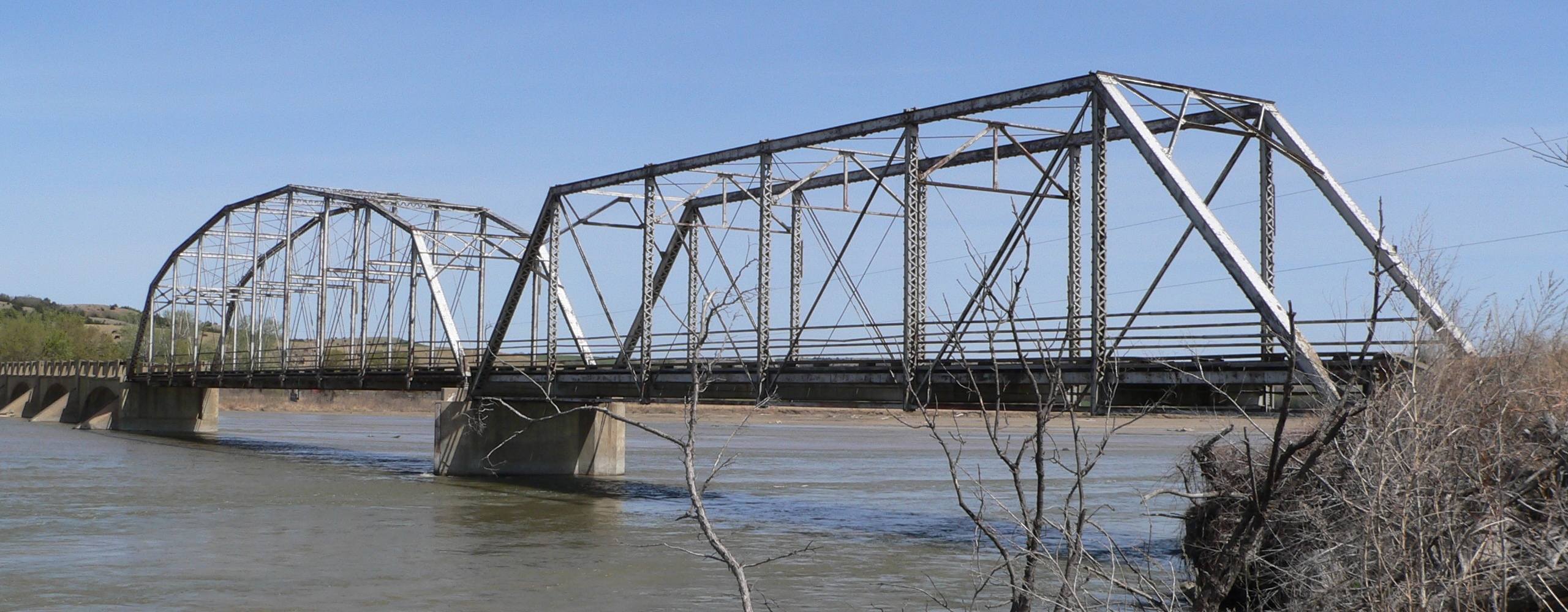

- Location within Nebraska Location within the United States
- Nearest city: Bassett, Nebraska
- Coordinates: 42°44′1″N 99°28′52″W
- Area: less than one acre
- Built: 1912
- Built by: Lincoln Construction Co.
- Architectural style: Parker & Pratt through truss
- MPS: Highway Bridges in Nebraska MPS
- NRHP reference No.: 92000722
- Added to NRHP: June 29, 1992

Carns State Aid Bridge is a historic bridge that spans the Niobrara River about 10.8 miles northeast of Bassett, Nebraska. It is a Parker & Pratt through truss bridge built in 1912. It has also been known as Niobrara River Bridge and denoted as NEHBS No. RO00-72. The bridge was heavily damaged in the 2019 flooding and ice jams and was closed to traffic. In 2025 work was begun to replace the bridge with a concrete structure and reroute the roadway.

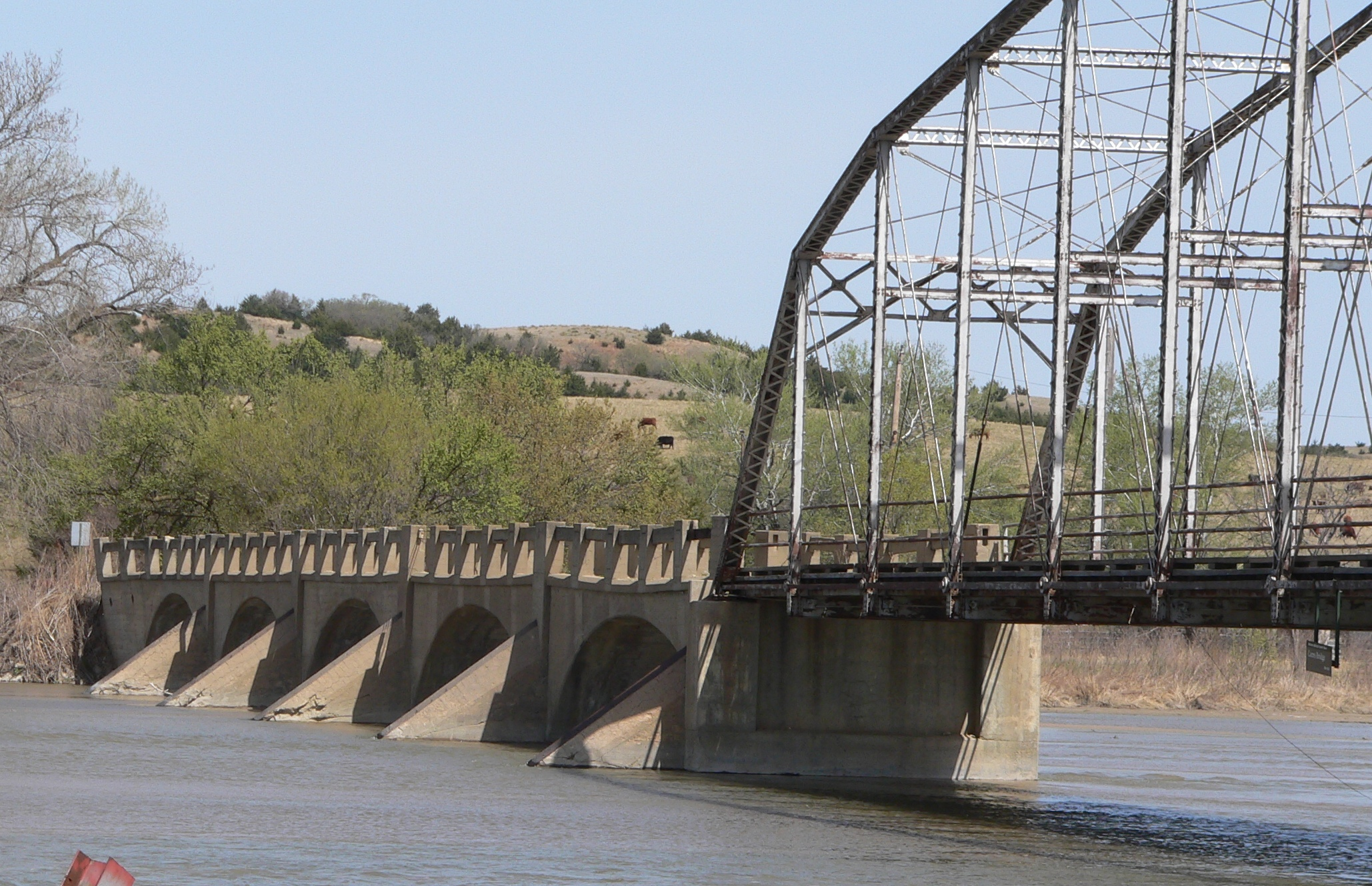

It was listed on the National Register of Historic Places in 1992.
