= John and Louise Seier National Wildlife Refuge =

National Wildlife Refuge in Nebraska

- IUCN category IV (habitat/species management area)
- Location within Nebraska Location within the United States
- Location: Rock County, Nebraska, USA
- Nearest city: Bassett, NE
- Coordinates: 42°22′10″N 100°4′28″W
- Area: 2,400 acres (970 ha)
- Established: October 1999
- Governing body: U.S. Fish and Wildlife Service
- Website: John and Louise Seier National Wildlife Refuge

John and Louise Seier National Wildlife Refuge is located in the U.S. state of Nebraska and includes 2,400 acres (9.71 km^{2}). The refuge protects a portion of the largest remaining area of tall and mid grass prairie remaining in the U.S. Collectively known as the Sand Hills region of Nebraska, the dunes were the result of the last ice age known as the Pinedale glaciation. During the Holocene glacial retreat the sand dunes that been deposited in their current location by the vast continental glaciers, were exposed and grasses eventually took over. The refuge is managed by the U.S. Fish and Wildlife Service and along with Fort Niobrara and Valentine National Wildlife Refuges, form the Fort Niobrara National Wildlife Refuge Complex.

This is an undeveloped refuge that was donated by the siblings John and Louise Seier to the U.S. Government to be preserved for wildlife. The Seier family had homesteaded the lands in the mid-19th century. The refuge is part forest and part wetland but the majority of it is tall grass prairie.

John and Louise Seier NWR is located about 25 miles (40.23 km) south of Bassett, Nebraska, off of U.S. Highway 183. The refuge is open to hunting.
