= Lincoln Construction Co. =

American construction company

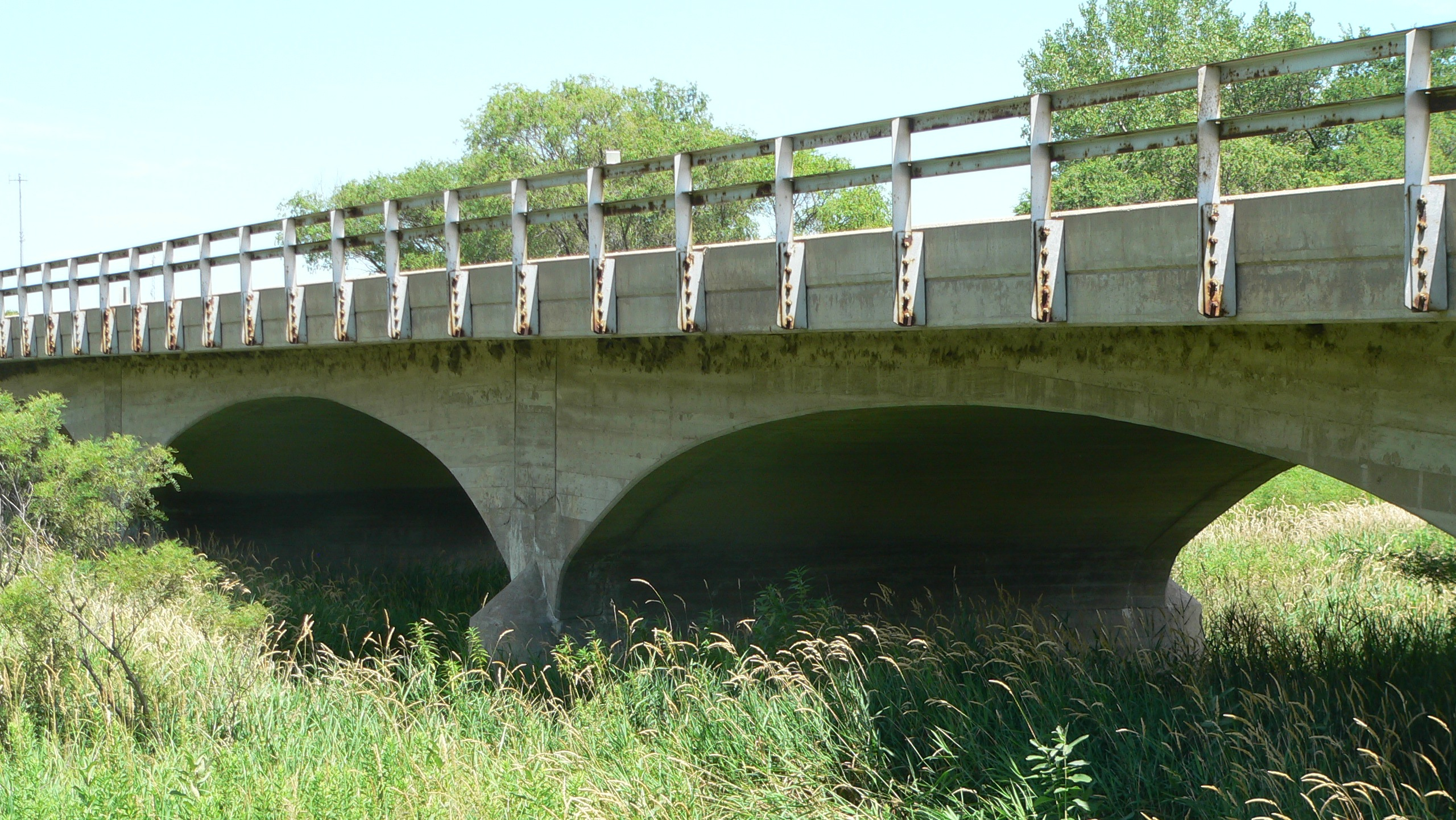
Cambridge State Aid Bridge

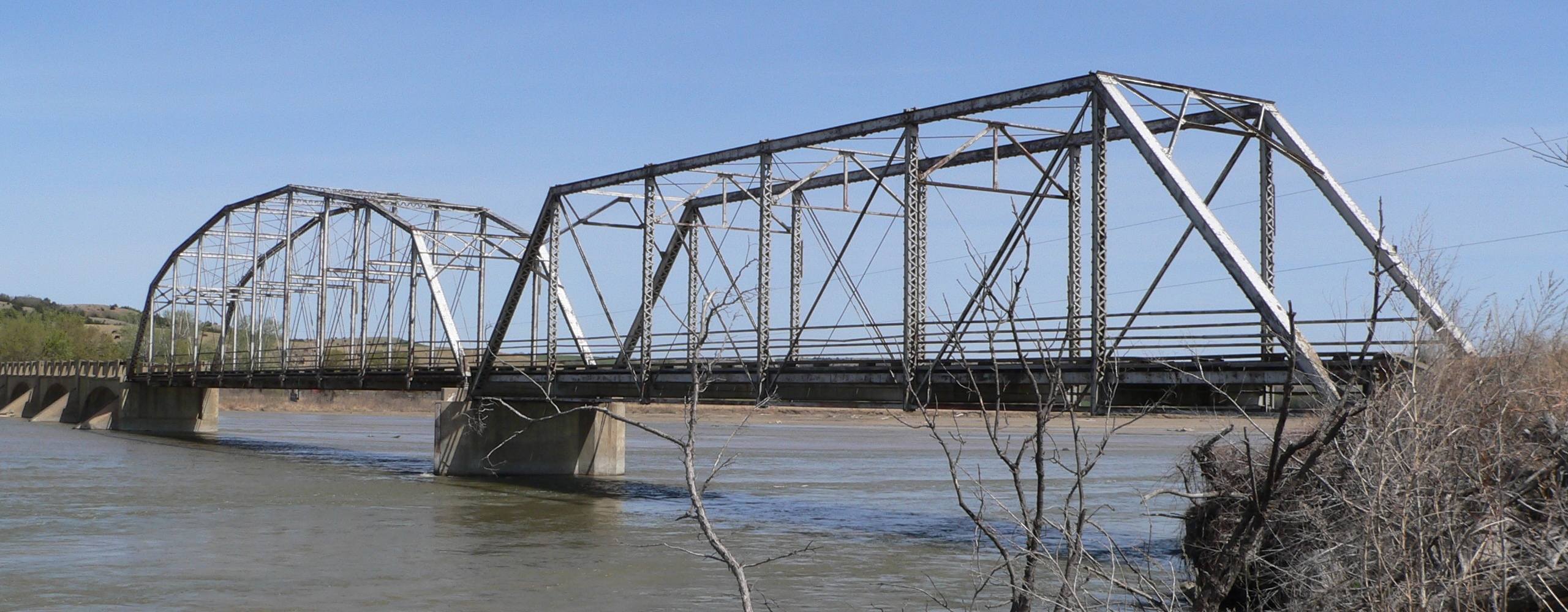
Carns State Aid Bridge

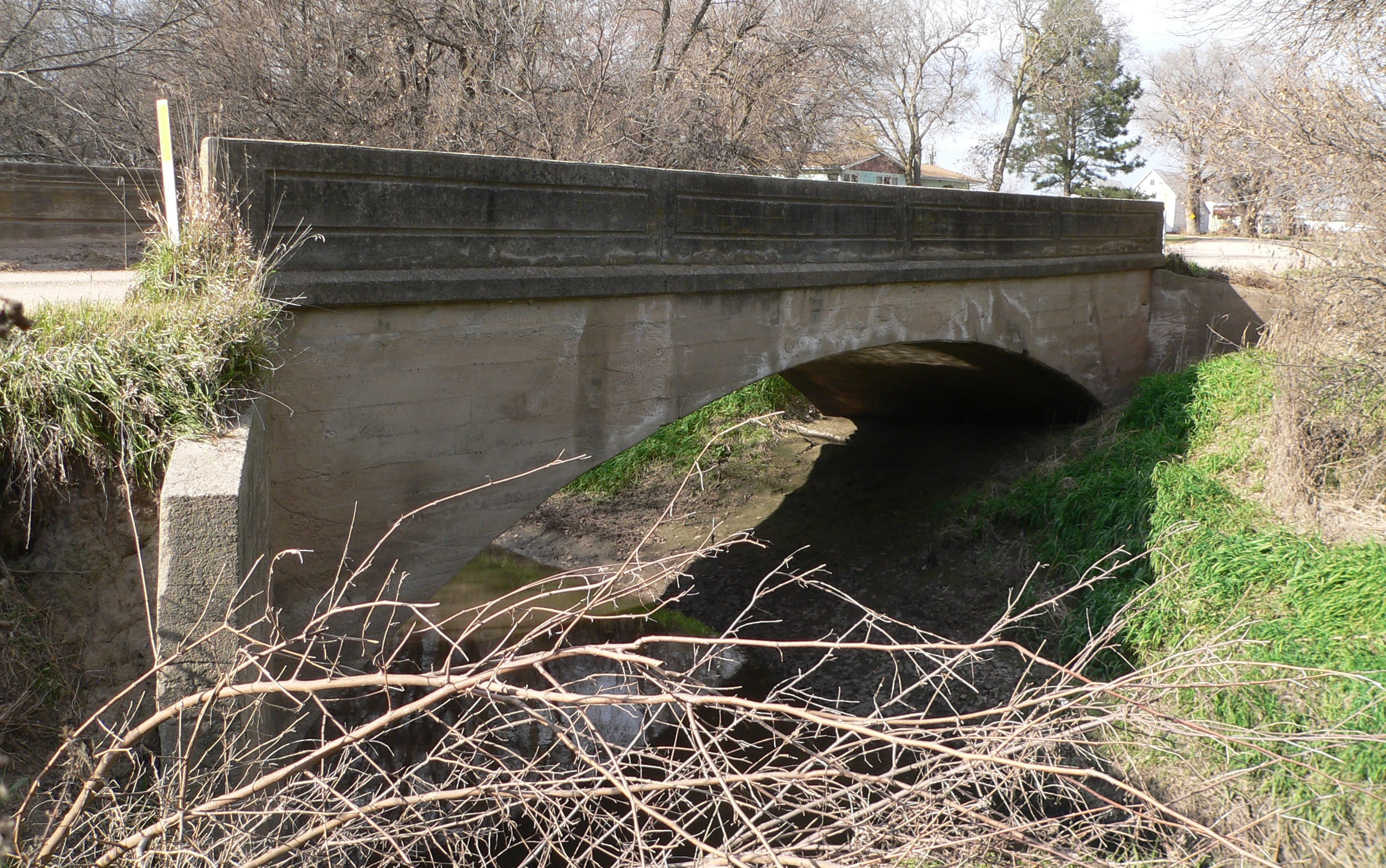
Deering Bridge

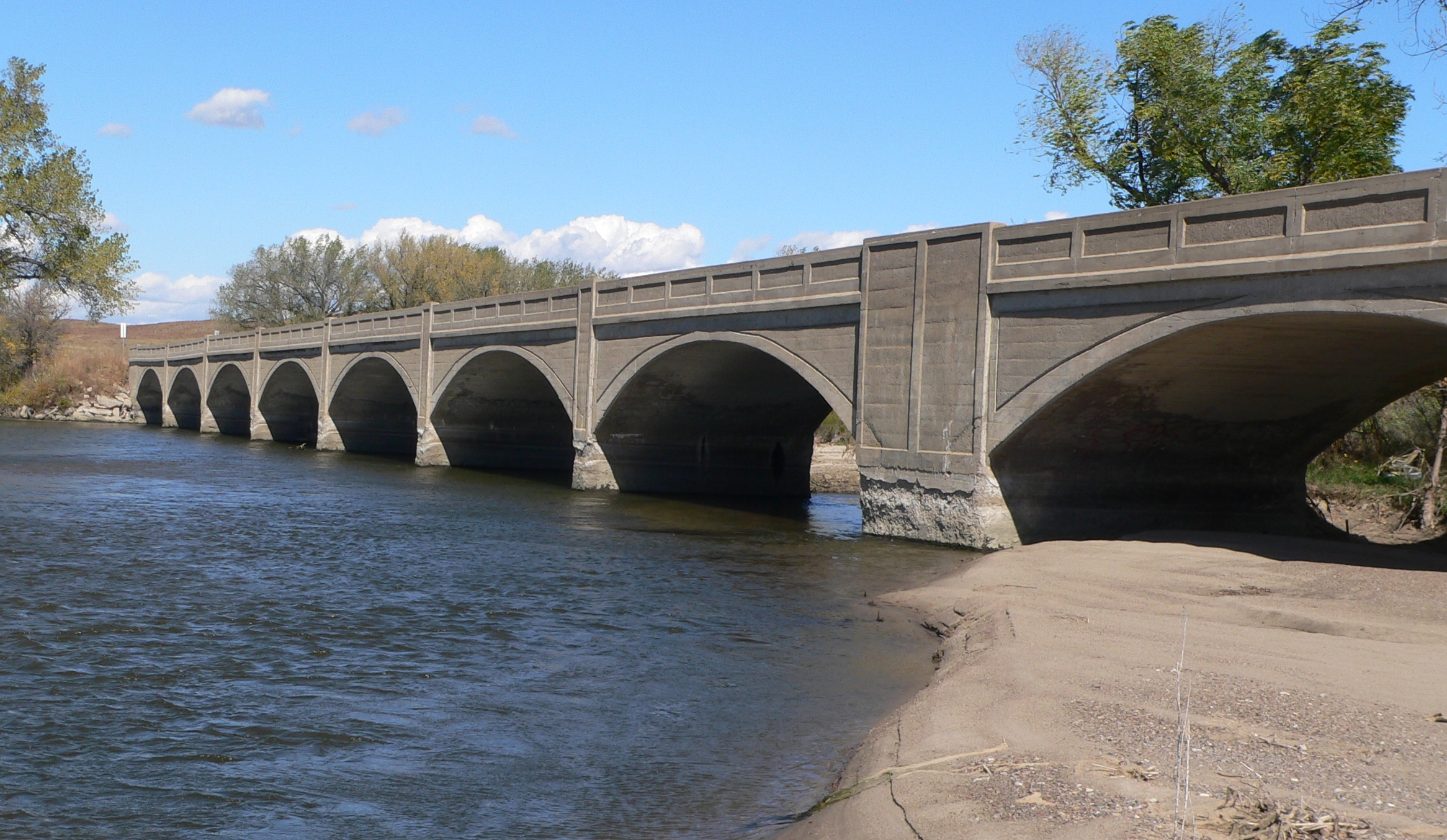
Sutherland State Aid Bridge

The Lincoln Construction Company was an American construction company in Nebraska. The company built several bridges in Nebraska between 1913 and 1916. A state engineer, after inspecting one of the company's bridge, found that "the workmanship as a whole was decidedly poor" and recommended suspending all payments on the bridge until the "poor appearance" was remedied. Company president, W.S. Collett, stated that the company's experience in the bridge business had been "more or less disastrous, from a financial point... which leads me to the conclusion that I had better quit while my credit remains good."

Despite the findings of the state engineer, five of the bridges built by Lincoln Construction Company have been listed on the National Register of Historic Places. They are:

- Cambridge State Aid Bridge, on Nebraska Highway 47 over the Republican River, 0.6 miles south of Cambridge, Nebraska (Lincoln Construction Co.), NRHP-listed
- Carns State Aid Bridge (1913), County Road over the Niobrara River, 10.8 miles northeast of Bassett, Nebraska (Nebraska State Engineer, designer, Lincoln Construction Company, builder), NRHP-listed
- Deering Bridge (1916), County Road over School Creek, 2 miles north, 2 miles east of Sutton, Nebraska (Nebraska Bureau of Roads & Bridges, designer, and Lincoln Construction Company, builder), NRHP-listed
- Stewart Bridge, County Road over Big Sandy Creek, 1 mile east and 8 miles north of Oak, Nebraska (Nebraska Highway Department and Lincoln Construction Co.), NRHP-listed
- Sutherland State Aid Bridge (1914–1915), County Road over the North Platte River, 4.2 miles north of Sutherland, Nebraska (Nebraska Bureau of Roads & Bridges, designer, and Lincoln Construction Company, builder of the arches), NRHP-listed
