= Rock County, Nebraska =

County in Nebraska, United States

- County
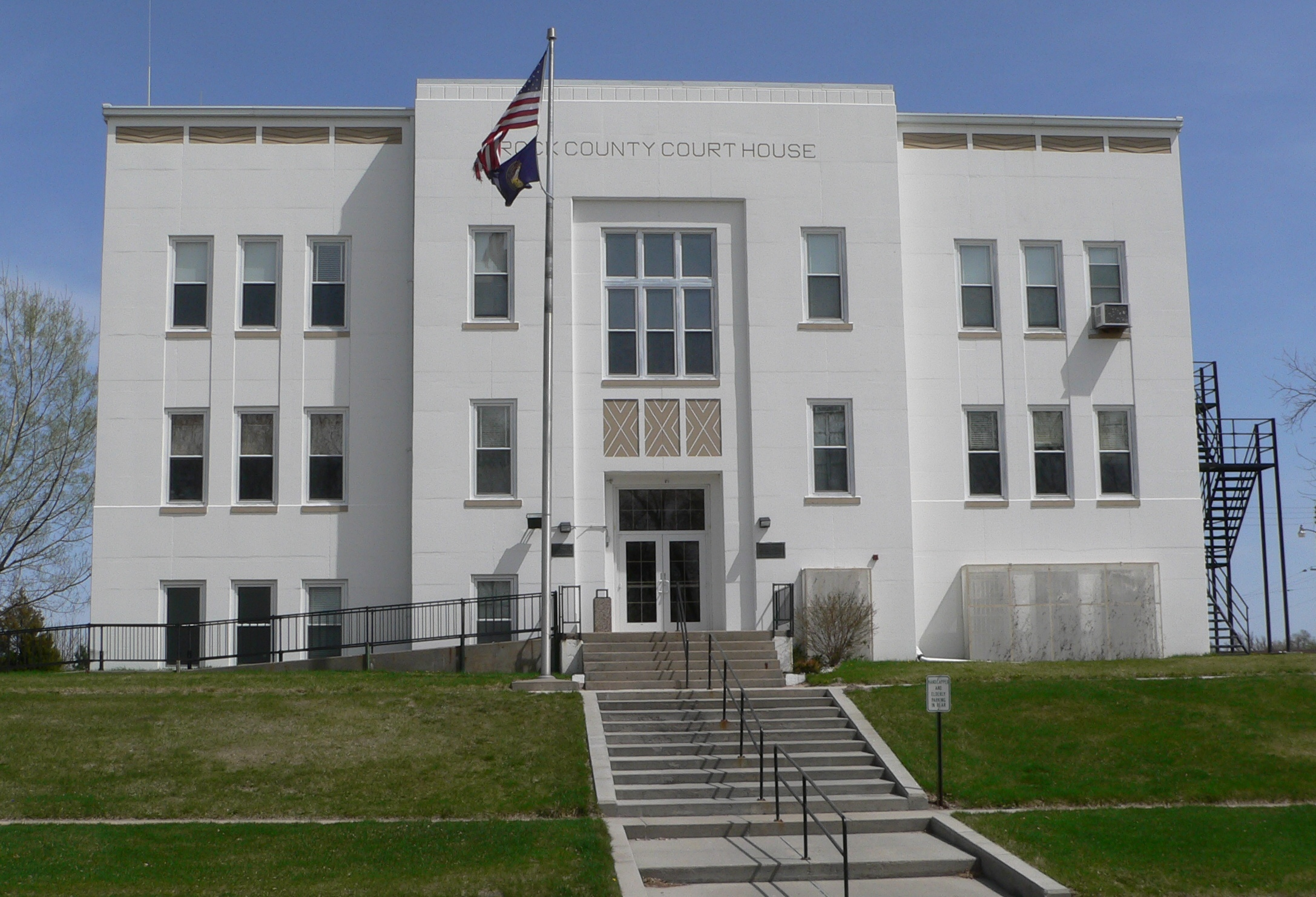
- The Rock County Courthouse in Bassett

- Location within the U.S. state of Nebraska
- Coordinates: 42.3947°N 99.4209°W
- Country: United States
- State: Nebraska
- Founded: November 6, 1888
- Named for: Rock Creek, or its rocky soil
- Seat: Bassett
- Largest city: Bassett

Area
  - Total: 1,011.693 sq mi (2,620.27 km^{2})
  - Land: 1,008.291 sq mi (2,611.46 km^{2})
  - Water: 3.402 sq mi (8.81 km^{2}) 0.34%

Population (2020)
  - Total: 1,262
  - Estimate (2025): 1,259 ▼
  - Density: 1.252/sq mi (0.4833/km^{2})
- Time zone: UTC−6 (Central)
  - Summer (DST): UTC−5 (CDT)
- Area code: 402 and 531
- Congressional district: 3rd
- Website: rockcountyne.gov
- • Nebraska county number 75 • Nebraska license plate prefix 81

Rock County is a county in the U.S. state of Nebraska. As of the 2020 census, the population was 1,262, and was estimated to be 1,259 in 2025. The county seat and the largest city is Bassett.

In the Nebraska license plate system, Rock County was represented by the prefix "81" (as it had the 81st-largest number of vehicles registered in the state when the license plate system was established in 1922).

== Geography ==
The Niobrara River flows eastward along the northern boundary line of Rock County. The terrain is composed of rolling hills oriented east–west. The county's central portion is dotted with small lakes. The land sees comparatively little agricultural use. The ground slopes to the northeast.

According to the United States Census Bureau, the county has a total area of 1,011.693 square miles (2,620.27 km^{2}), of which 1,008.291 square miles (2,611.46 km^{2}) is land and 3.402 square miles (8.81 km^{2}) (0.34%) is water. It is the 16th-largest county in Nebraska by total area.

Rock County is located in Nebraska's Outback region.

=== Major highways ===
- U.S. Highway 20
- U.S. Highway 183
- Nebraska Highway 7
- Nebraska Highway 137

=== Adjacent counties ===
- Keya Paha County - north
- Boyd County - northeast
- Holt County - east
- Loup County - south
- Brown County - west

=== National protected areas ===
- John and Louise Seier National Wildlife Refuge
- Niobrara National Scenic River (part)
- Twin Lakes Rock County Wildlife Management Area

== Demographics ==
Historical population
Census	Pop.	Note	%±
1890	3,083		—
1900	2,809		−8.9%
1910	3,627		29.1%
1920	3,703		2.1%
1930	3,366		−9.1%
1940	3,977		18.2%
1950	3,026		−23.9%
1960	2,554		−15.6%
1970	2,231		−12.6%
1980	2,383		6.8%
1990	2,019		−15.3%
2000	1,756		−13.0%
2010	1,526		−13.1%
2020	1,262		−17.3%
2025 (est.)	1,259	▼	−0.2%
U.S. Decennial Census; 1790–1960 1900–1990; 1990–2000 2010–2020

=== 2020 census ===
As of the 2020 census, the county had a population of 1,262. The median age was 49.5 years. 19.5% of residents were under the age of 18 and 28.8% of residents were 65 years of age or older. For every 100 females there were 98.7 males, and for every 100 females age 18 and over there were 96.9 males age 18 and over.

The racial makeup of the county was 96.9% White, 0.2% Black or African American, 0.1% American Indian and Alaska Native, 0.0% Asian, 0.0% Native Hawaiian and Pacific Islander, 0.7% from some other race, and 2.1% from two or more races. Hispanic or Latino residents of any race comprised 1.6% of the population.

0.0% of residents lived in urban areas, while 100.0% lived in rural areas.

There were 583 households in the county, of which 21.8% had children under the age of 18 living with them and 22.6% had a female householder with no spouse or partner present. About 32.3% of all households were made up of individuals and 18.5% had someone living alone who was 65 years of age or older.

There were 795 housing units, of which 26.7% were vacant. Among occupied housing units, 78.9% were owner-occupied and 21.1% were renter-occupied. The homeowner vacancy rate was 4.5% and the rental vacancy rate was 15.9%.

=== 2000 census ===
As of the 2000 census, there were 1,756 people, 763 households, and 501 families in the county. The population density was 2 people per square mile (0.77 people/km^{2}). There were 935 housing units at an average density of 0.9 units per square mile (0.35/km^{2}). The racial makeup of the county was 99.03% White, 0.46% Native American, 0.17% Asian, 0.06% from other races, and 0.28% from two or more races. 0.51% of the population were Hispanic or Latino of any race. 33.1% were of German, 12.7% American, 10.5% Irish and 8.4% English ancestry.

There were 763 households, out of which 26.90% had children under the age of 18 living with them, 57.40% were married couples living together, 6.40% had a female householder with no husband present, and 34.30% were non-families. 31.30% of all households were made up of individuals, and 15.90% had someone living alone who was 65 years of age or older. The average household size was 2.26 and the average family size was 2.84.

The county population contained 23.00% under the age of 18, 6.50% from 18 to 24, 23.60% from 25 to 44, 24.60% from 45 to 64, and 22.30% who were 65 years of age or older. The median age was 44 years. For every 100 females there were 92.30 males. For every 100 females age 18 and over, there were 89.90 males.

The median income for a household in the county was $25,795, and the median income for a family was $29,917. Males had a median income of $24,167 versus $16,490 for females. The per capita income for the county was $14,350. About 17.70% of families and 21.80% of the population were below the poverty line, including 36.30% of those under age 18 and 14.00% of those age 65 or over.

== Communities ==
=== City ===
- Bassett (county seat)

=== Village ===
- Newport

=== Unincorporated communities ===
- Duff
- Mariaville
- Rose
- Sybrant

== Politics ==
Rock County voters historically have been reliably Republican. In only one national election since 1916 has the county selected the Democratic Party candidate (as of 2024).

Political Party	Number of registered voters (April 1, 2026)	Percent
Republican	917	87.42%
Democratic	65	6.20%
Independent	60	5.72%
Libertarian	6	0.57%
Legal Marijuana Now	1	0.10%
Total	1,049	100.00%

United States presidential election results for Rock County, Nebraska
Year	Republican		Democratic		Third party(ies)	
Year	No.	%	No.	%	No.	%
1900	481	65.71%	243	33.20%	8	1.09%
1904	498	70.64%	138	19.57%	69	9.79%
1908	469	56.37%	334	40.14%	29	3.49%
1912	230	26.47%	279	32.11%	360	41.43%
1916	375	42.66%	449	51.08%	55	6.26%
1920	621	70.17%	239	27.01%	25	2.82%
1924	585	47.33%	293	23.71%	358	28.96%
1928	1,034	77.11%	305	22.74%	2	0.15%
1932	613	42.42%	810	56.06%	22	1.52%
1936	944	56.46%	710	42.46%	18	1.08%
1940	1,104	64.79%	600	35.21%	0	0.00%
1944	984	66.04%	506	33.96%	0	0.00%
1948	809	64.00%	455	36.00%	0	0.00%
1952	1,226	82.12%	267	17.88%	0	0.00%
1956	928	76.76%	281	23.24%	0	0.00%
1960	1,084	81.08%	253	18.92%	0	0.00%
1964	835	68.95%	376	31.05%	0	0.00%
1968	791	76.72%	146	14.16%	94	9.12%
1972	937	87.16%	138	12.84%	0	0.00%
1976	732	72.55%	255	25.27%	22	2.18%
1980	855	80.74%	146	13.79%	58	5.48%
1984	873	85.34%	147	14.37%	3	0.29%
1988	757	79.10%	198	20.69%	2	0.21%
1992	588	59.57%	162	16.41%	237	24.01%
1996	564	63.73%	180	20.34%	141	15.93%
2000	725	81.10%	141	15.77%	28	3.13%
2004	740	83.81%	130	14.72%	13	1.47%
2008	640	79.90%	139	17.35%	22	2.75%
2012	672	85.17%	103	13.05%	14	1.77%
2016	687	86.09%	70	8.77%	41	5.14%
2020	744	88.36%	84	9.98%	14	1.66%
2024	745	89.22%	85	10.18%	5	0.60%

== Education ==
Rock County Public Schools operates the public schools in Rock County.

== See also ==
- National Register of Historic Places listings in Rock County, Nebraska
