= Sybrant, Nebraska =

Unincorporated community in Nebraska, U.S.

Coordinates: 42°19′06″N 99°21′04″W

Sybrant is an unincorporated community in Rock County, Nebraska, United States.

== History ==
A post office was established at Sybrant in 1895 and remained in operation until it was discontinued in 1932. The community was named for David O. Sybrant.
