= Duff, Nebraska =

Unincorporated community in Nebraska, United States

Duff
- Unincorporated Community
- Location within Nebraska Location within the United States
- Coordinates: 42°12′09″N 99°36′15″W
- Country: United States
- State: Nebraska
- County: Rock

Duff is an unincorporated community in Rock County, Nebraska, United States.

== History ==
A post office was established at Duff in 1892, and remained in operation until it was discontinued in 1953. Duff was likely the name of an early settler.
