= Sutherland State Aid Bridge =

- U.S. National Register of Historic Places
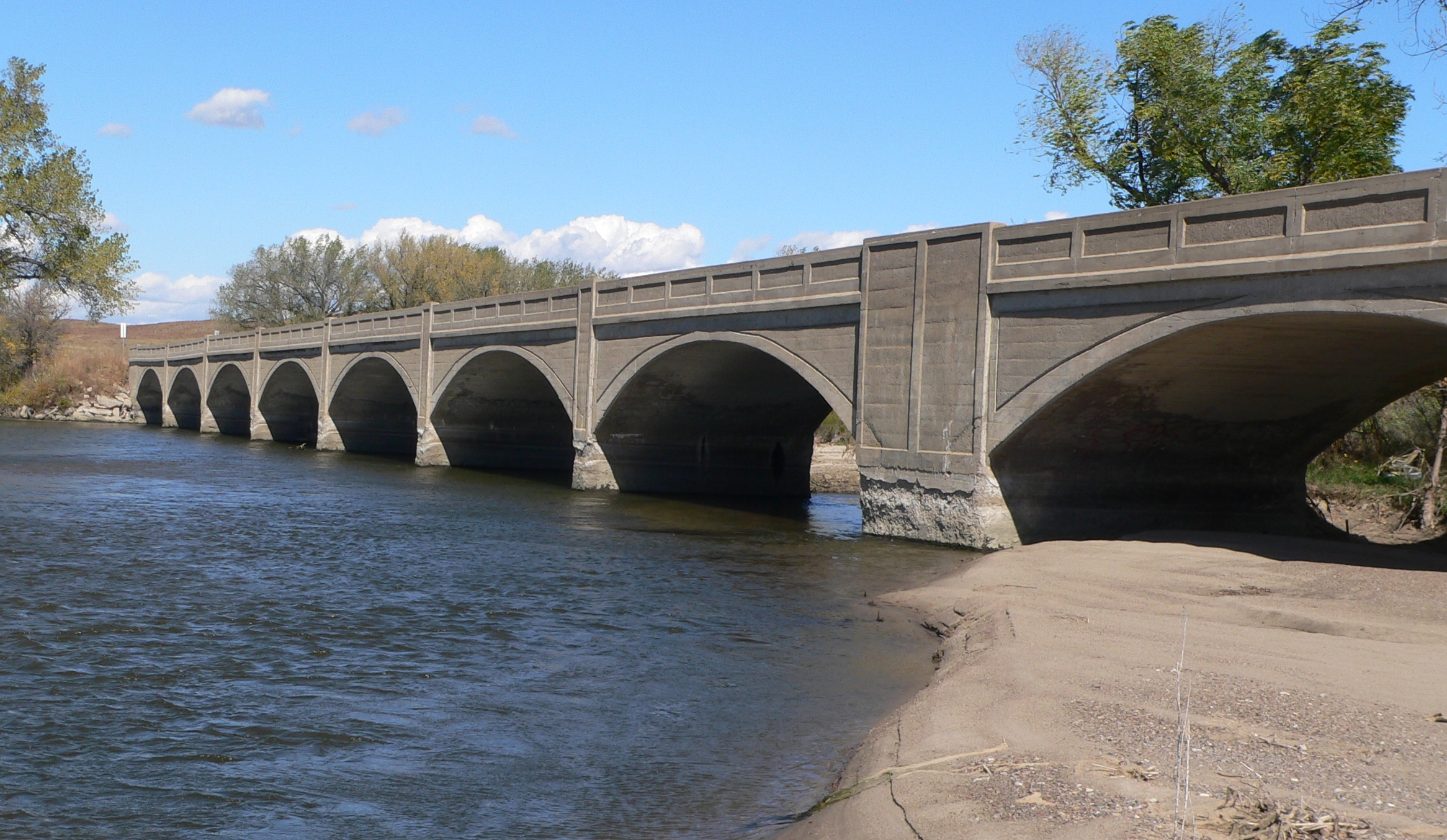
- The bridge in 2011

- Location within Nebraska Location within the United States
- Nearest city: Sutherland, Nebraska
- Coordinates: 41°12′41″N 100°59′51″W
- Area: less than one acre
- Built: 1914
- Built by: Lincoln Construction Co.
- Architectural style: Concrete spandrel arch
- MPS: Highway Bridges in Nebraska MPS
- NRHP reference No.: 92000705
- Added to NRHP: June 29, 1992

The Sutherland State Aid Bridge was a historic bridge in Sutherland, Nebraska. It was built in 1914 by Lincoln Construction Co., with concrete spandrel arches. It was listed on the National Register of Historic Places on June 29, 1992. The bridge was demolished and replaced in 2024.
