= Rose, Nebraska =

Unincorporated community in Nebraska, U.S.

Coordinates: 42°10′50″N 99°31′32″W

Rose is an unincorporated community in Rock County, Nebraska, United States, located on the east side of U.S. Route 183. As of 2015, the hamlet consisted of two houses.

== History ==
The first post office at Rose was established in 1905 and was discontinued in 1908. The community was named for the wild rose bushes growing near the town site.
