= Rock County Public Schools =

School district in Nebraska, United States

Rock County Public Schools is a school district in Nebraska, United States.

== Schools ==
Schools include:

- Bassett Grade School (Bassett)
- Pony Lake School - unincorporated area; 23 miles (37 km) southeast of Bassett
- Rose Community School - unincorporated area; on U.S. Highway 183, 28 miles (45 km) south of Bassett
- Rock County High School (Bassett)
