= Mud Lake (Nebraska) =

There are several lakes named Mud Lake within the U.S. state of Nebraska.

- Mud Lake, Cherry County, Nebraska. 42°25′41″N 101°24′05″W
- Mudd Lake, also known as Mud Lake, Logan County, Nebraska. 41°39′05″N 100°26′14″W
