= Valentine National Wildlife Refuge =

Protected tall and mid grass prairie in Nebraska

- IUCN category IV (habitat/species management area)
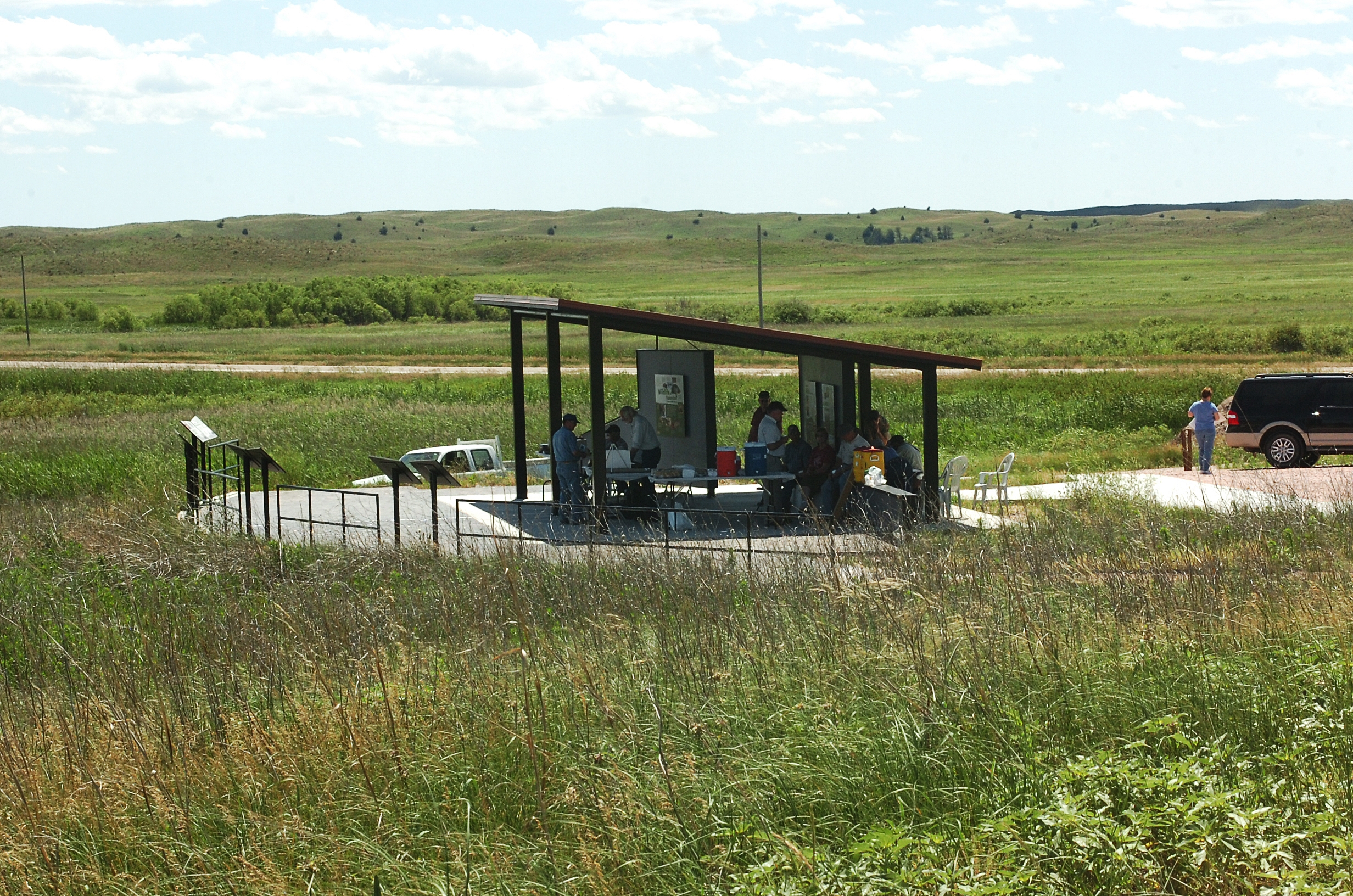
- Picnic area at Valentine National Wildlife Refuge, June 2010

- Location within Nebraska Location within the United States
- Location: Cherry County, Nebraska, United States
- Nearest city: Valentine, NE
- Coordinates: 42°29′37″N 100°34′22″W
- Area: 71,516 acres (28,941 ha)
- Established: 1935
- Governing body: U.S. Fish and Wildlife Service
- Website: Valentine National Wildlife Refuge

U.S. National Natural Landmark
- Designated: 1976

Valentine National Wildlife Refuge is located in the U.S. state of Nebraska and includes 19,131 acres (77.42 km^{2}). The refuge protects a portion of the largest remaining area of tall and mid grass prairie in the United States.

== Development ==
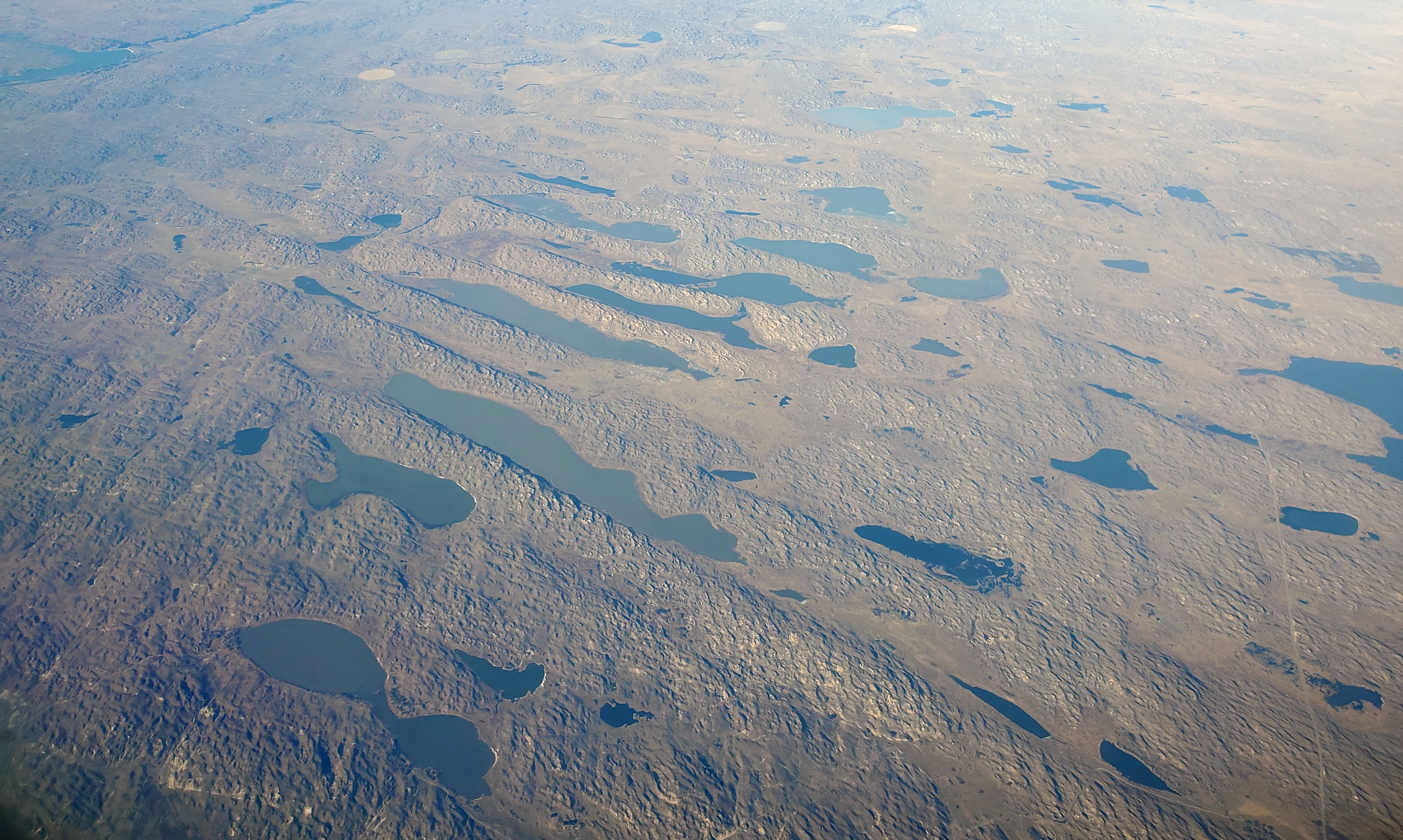
Aerial view of the refuge

Collectively known as the sand hills region of Nebraska, the dunes were the result of the last ice age known as the Pinedale glaciation. During the Holocene glacial retreat the sand dunes that been deposited in their current location by the vast continental glaciers, were exposed and grasses eventually took over.

== Management ==
The refuge is managed by the U.S. Fish and Wildlife Service and along with Fort Niobrara and John and Louise Seier National Wildlife Refuges, they form the Fort Niobrara National Wildlife Refuge Complex. In 1976, the Valentine National Wildlife Refuge was designated as a National Natural Landmark by the National Park Service.

== Natural features ==
Numerous lakes and ponds are located on the refuge, fed by underground seeps and springs. 260 species of birds have been identified over the years on the refuge, and during migratory periods in the spring and fall, 150,000 birds pass through the protected area. Coyote, blanding's turtle, prairie grouse, white-tailed and Mule deer are commonly found by visitors in this refuge. Muskrat and beaver inhabit the wetlands and streams.

== Location ==
Valentine NWR is located about 20 miles (32 km) south of Valentine, Nebraska off U.S. Highway 83.
