= Bassett, Nebraska =

City in and county seat of Rock County, Nebraska, United States

- City
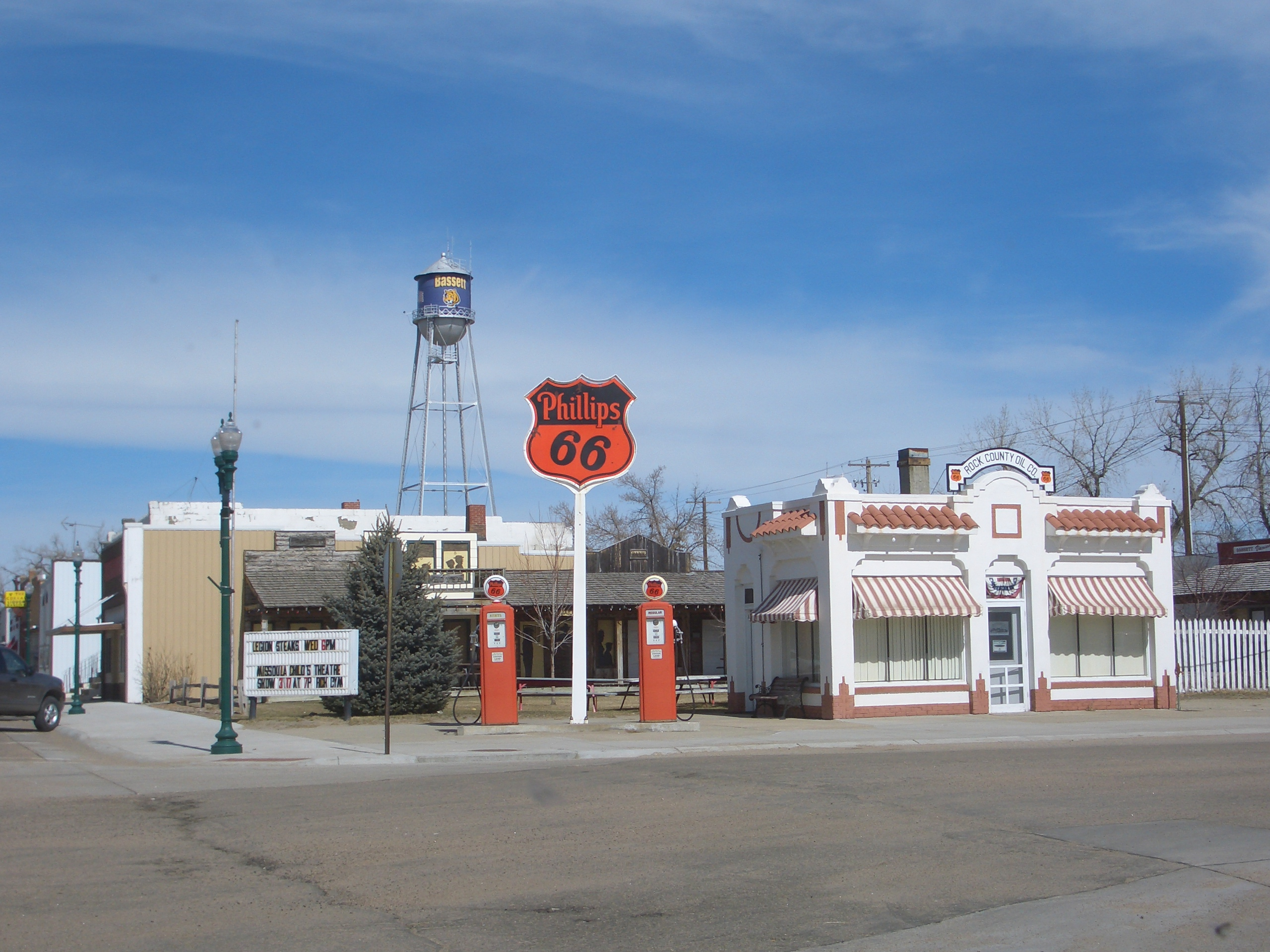
- Old-fashioned Phillips 66 station in Bassett

- Location of Bassett, Nebraska
- Coordinates: 42°34′57″N 99°32′12″W
- Country: United States
- State: Nebraska
- County: Rock

Area
  - Total: 0.44 sq mi (1.15 km^{2})
  - Land: 0.44 sq mi (1.15 km^{2})
  - Water: 0 sq mi (0.00 km^{2})
- Elevation: 2,339 ft (713 m)

Population (2020)
  - Total: 538
  - Density: 1,212/sq mi (468.1/km^{2})
- Time zone: UTC-6 (Central (CST))
  - Summer (DST): UTC-5 (CDT)
- ZIP code: 68714
- Area code: 402
- FIPS code: 31-03215
- GNIS feature ID: 2394076
- Website: bassettnebr.com

Bassett is a city in and the county seat of Rock County, Nebraska, United States. The population was 538 at the 2020 census.

== History ==
Bassett was platted in 1884 soon after the railroad was built through that territory. Sources differ whether it was named for A. N. Bassett, or J. W. Basset, a pioneer settler.

== Geography ==
According to the United States Census Bureau, the city has a total area of 0.44 square miles (1.14 km^{2}), all land.

== Demographics ==
Historical population
Census	Pop.	Note	%±
1900	270		—
1910	383		41.9%
1920	664		73.4%
1930	635		−4.4%
1940	931		46.6%
1950	1,066		14.5%
1960	1,023		−4.0%
1970	983		−3.9%
1980	1,009		2.6%
1990	739		−26.8%
2000	743		0.5%
2010	619		−16.7%
2020	538		−13.1%
U.S. Decennial Census

=== 2010 census ===
As of the census of 2010, there were 619 people, 306 households, and 162 families living in the city. The population density was 1,406.8 inhabitants per square mile (543.2/km^{2}). There were 410 housing units at an average density of 931.8 per square mile (359.8/km^{2}). The racial makeup of the city was 98.4% White, 1.1% Native American, 0.3% Asian, and 0.2% from two or more races. Hispanic or Latino of any race were 0.2% of the population.

There were 306 households, of which 19.0% had children under the age of 18 living with them, 44.8% were married couples living together, 4.9% had a female householder with no husband present, 3.3% had a male householder with no wife present, and 47.1% were non-families. 43.8% of all households were made up of individuals, and 24.1% had someone living alone who was 65 years of age or older. The average household size was 1.92 and the average family size was 2.64.

The median age in the city was 51.9 years. 17.8% of residents were under the age of 18; 5% were between the ages of 18 and 24; 18.4% were from 25 to 44; 28.9% were from 45 to 64; and 29.7% were 65 years of age or older. The gender makeup of the city was 46.8% male and 53.2% female.

=== 2000 census ===
As of the census of 2000, there were 743 people, 355 households, and 189 families living in the city. The population density was 1,676.8 inhabitants per square mile (647.4/km^{2}). There were 419 housing units at an average density of 945.6 per square mile (365.1/km^{2}). The racial makeup of the city was 98.25% White, 0.67% Native American, 0.27% Asian, 0.13% from other races, and 0.67% from two or more races. Hispanic or Latino of any race were 0.67% of the population.

There were 355 households, out of which 21.4% had children under the age of 18 living with them, 46.5% were married couples living together, 5.9% had a female householder with no husband present, and 46.5% were non-families. 43.1% of all households were made up of individuals, and 24.2% had someone living alone who was 65 years of age or older. The average household size was 2.01 and the average family size was 2.80.

In the city, the population was spread out, with 19.9% under the age of 18, 6.2% from 18 to 24, 21.0% from 25 to 44, 22.3% from 45 to 64, and 30.6% who were 65 years of age or older. The median age was 47 years. For every 100 females, there were 79.0 males. For every 100 females age 18 and over, there were 75.5 males.

As of 2000 the median income for a household in the city was $24,412, and the median income for a family was $32,778. Males had a median income of $25,329 versus $15,278 for females. The per capita income for the city was $13,856. About 16.8% of families and 20.2% of the population were below the poverty line, including 34.2% of those under age 18 and 15.7% of those age 65 or over.

== Education ==
Rock County Public Schools operates public schools.

== Notable people ==
- Colby Coash, Nebraska legislator
- Richard Wills, Idaho State representative

== See also ==
- List of municipalities in Nebraska
