= B'nai Jeshurun =

B'nai Jeshurun (Hebrew: בני ישורון "Sons/Children of the Upright") may refer to the following Jewish synagogues:

== United States ==
- Temple of Congregation B'nai Jeshurun (Lincoln, Nebraska)
- Congregation Bnai Yeshurun, a large Orthodox community in Teaneck, New Jersey
- B'nai Jeshurun (Manhattan, New York), the second synagogue founded in New York and the third-oldest Ashkenazi synagogue in the United States
- K. K. B'nai Yeshurun (Cincinnati, Ohio), commonly known as the Isaac M. Wise Temple
- Temple Israel (Dayton, Ohio), known from the mid-nineteenth to the mid-twentieth centuries as "B'nai Jeshurun"
- Congregation Emanu-El B'ne Jeshurun (River Hills, Wisconsin)

=== Former synagogues ===
- Temple B'nai Jeshurun (Demopolis, Alabama)

== See also ==
- Jeshurun
