= Wyuka Cemetery =

Historic cemetery in Lancaster County, Nebraska

- U.S. National Register of Historic Places
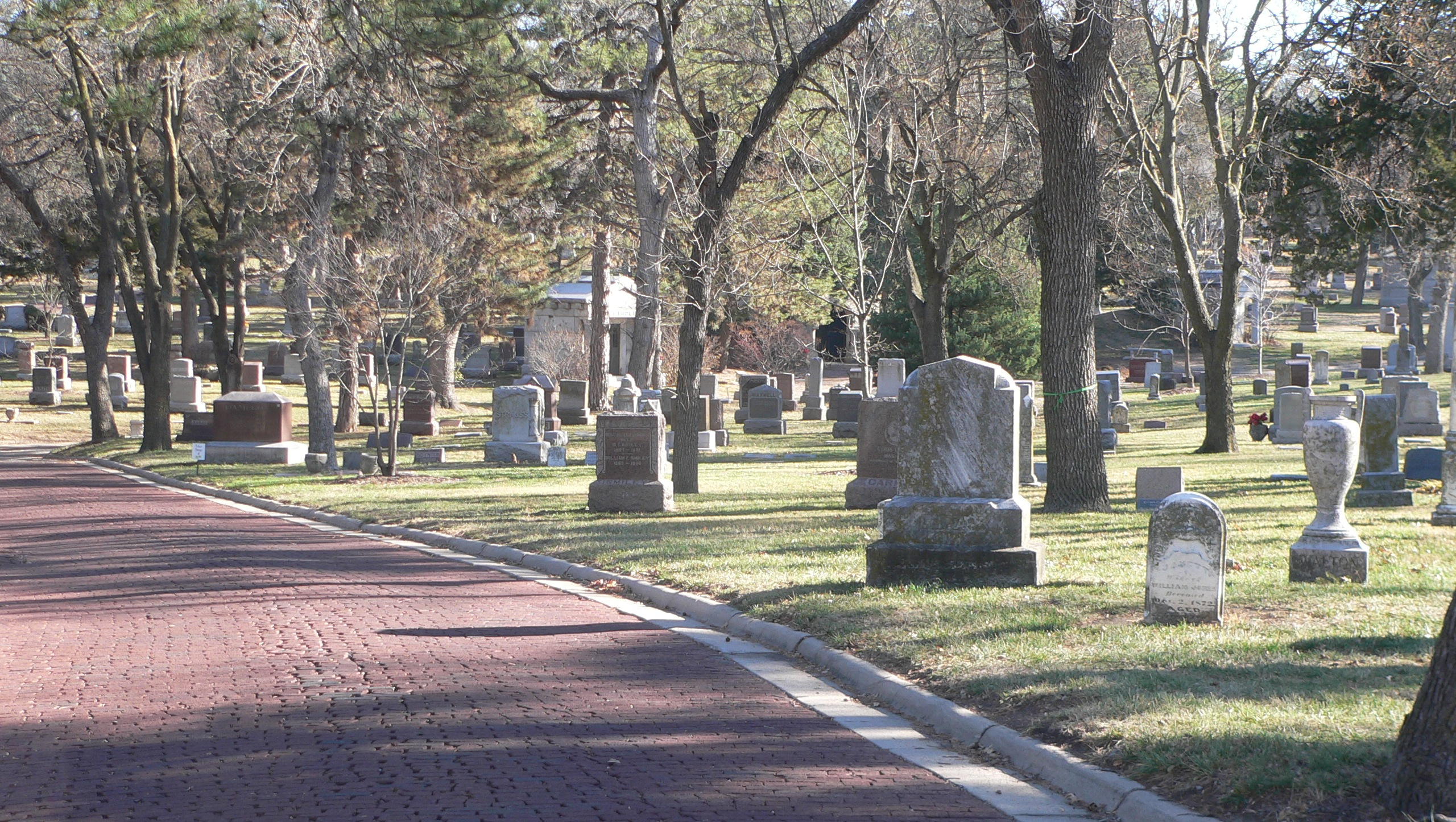
- Graves along brick-paved road in southeastern portion of Wyuka Cemetery

- Location within Nebraska Location within the United States
- Location: 3600 O St., Lincoln, Nebraska, U.S.
- Coordinates: 40°49′1″N 96°39′54″W
- Area: 124 acres (50 ha)
- Built: 1869
- Architect: Hawkins, J.H.W.; Lamoreaux, L.A.
- Architectural style: Romanesque
- NRHP reference No.: 82003198
- Added to NRHP: July 19, 1982

Wyuka Cemetery is the largest cemetery in Lincoln, Nebraska.

In 1890, Lincoln's Bnai Jeshurun Congregation, a Reform congregation, began using a section of Wyuka. In 2007, the Nebraska Holocaust Memorial was established at Wyuka Cemetery.

== History ==
Wyuka Cemetery was established in Lincoln, Nebraska, by an act of the Nebraska Legislature in 1869, which sought to provide a cemetery for the state capital city founded two years prior. The trustees rejected the first cemetery site along Salt Creek to the west of Lincoln due to flooding concerns and instead purchased 80 acres of land east of the city. Wyuka Cemetery has since expanded to over 140 acres between O Street and Vine Street.

The iron fence surrounding the cemetery was originally erected around the University of Nebraska-Lincoln City Campus. The Board of Regents authorized the construction of the fence in 1891, and the fence enclosed the original campus until 1925 when it was removed due to safety concerns because fire engines could not pass through the width of the gates.

Wyuka Cemetery was added to the National Register of Historic Places in 1982 and is considered a prime example of the rural cemetery form.

In 2025, the mural from Pershing Center was installed on the cemetery grounds.

== Notable interments ==
- Hazel Abel (1888–1966), US Senator
- Victor Anderson (1902–1962), Governor of Nebraska
- Charles W. Bryan (1867–1945), Mayor of Lincoln and Governor of Nebraska
- Elmer J. Burkett (1867–1935), US Senator
- Amasa Cobb (1823–1905), US Congressman
- Emily M. J. Cooley (1831-1917), religious and temperance leader
- Oren Sturman Copeland (1887–1958), US Congressman
- Elizabeth Hawley Everett (1857-1940), clubwoman, suffragist, author, magazine founder/editor, school principal, superintendent of schools
- J. James Exon (1921–2005), Governor of Nebraska and US Senator
- Eugene Jerome Hainer (1851–1929), US Congressman
- Don Hollenbeck (1905–1954), Radio newscaster and commentator
- John Claus Hubbard (1852-1907), Founder of Omaha's first Black newspaper and African-American political figure
- John Larkin (1901–1965), Hollywood screenwriter
- Gilbert L. Laws (1838–1907), US Congressman
- Gordon MacRae (1921–1986), singer and actor
- Turner M. Marquett (1829–1894), US Congressman
- Samuel Roy McKelvie (1881–1956), Governor of Nebraska
- Milton Montgomery (1825–1897), Civil War Brevet Brigadier General
- Albinus Nance (1848–1911), Governor of Nebraska
- Louise Pound (1872–1958), American folklorist, linguist, and English professor
- William A. Poynter (1848–1909), Governor of Nebraska
- Peter Sauer (1900–1949), Russian-born World Wrestling champion using the ring name Ray Steele
- Charles Starkweather (1938–1959), spree killer
- Jesse Burr Strode (1845–1924), US Congressman
- John Milton Thayer (1820–1906), Governor of Nebraska, US Senator and Union General
- Roy Henry Thorpe (1874–1951), US Congressman
- Bobby Rae Williams (1942–2012), professional football player
