= Nehawka, Nebraska =

- Village
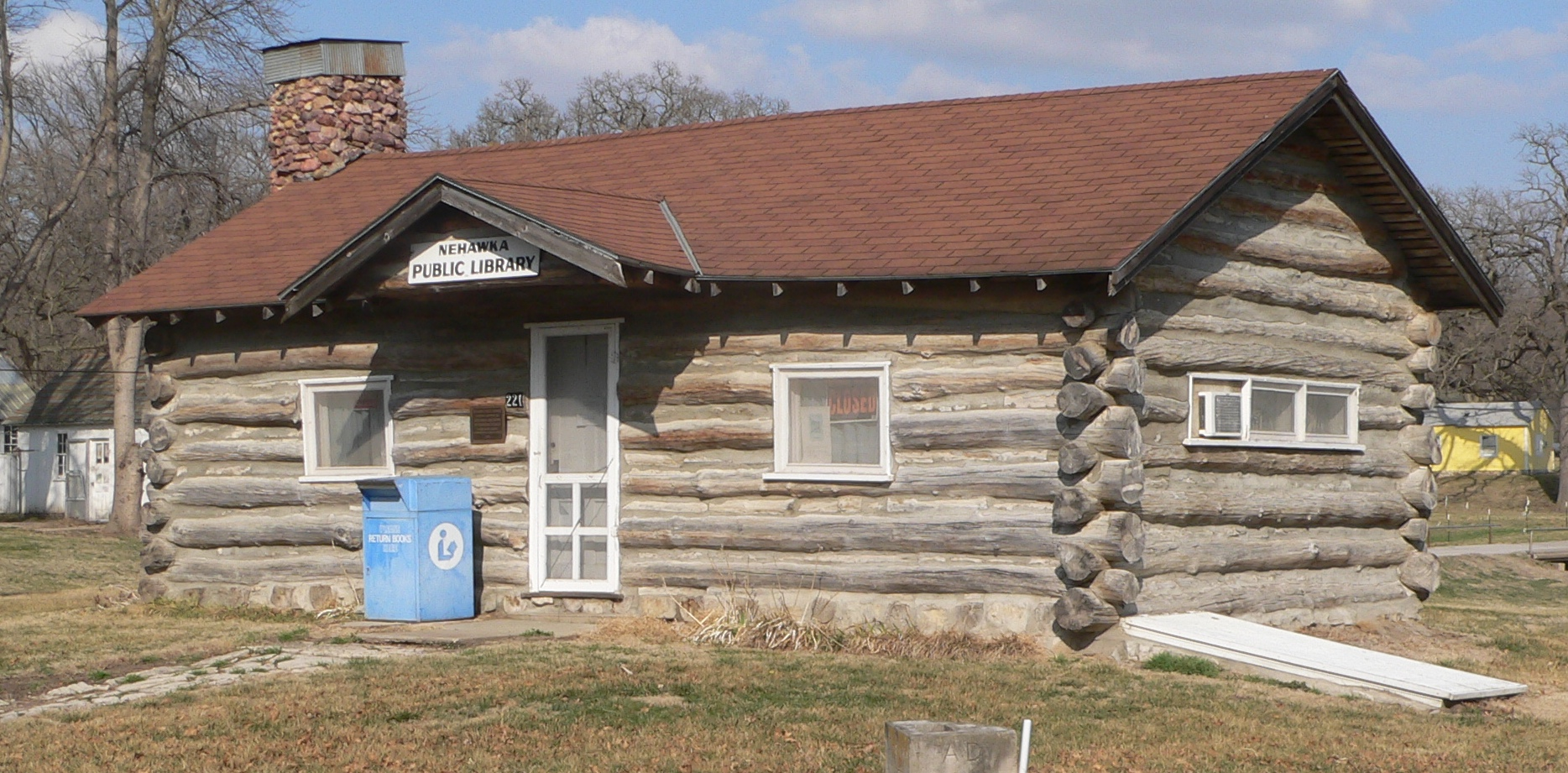
- Nehawka's 1934 log cabin library is listed in the National Register of Historic Places.

- Location of Nehawka, Nebraska
- Coordinates: 40.82961°N 95.99001°W
- Country: United States
- State: Nebraska
- County: Cass
- Platted: 1887

Area
  - Total: 0.23 sq mi (0.59 km^{2})
  - Land: 0.23 sq mi (0.59 km^{2})
  - Water: 0 sq mi (0.00 km^{2})
- Elevation: 997 ft (304 m)

Population (2020)
  - Total: 173
  - Density: 763.6/sq mi (294.83/km^{2})
- Time zone: UTC-6 (Central (CST))
  - Summer (DST): UTC-5 (CDT)
- ZIP code: 68413
- Area code: 402
- FIPS code: 31-33740
- GNIS feature ID: 2399441
- Website: www.nehawkanebraska.com

Nehawka is a village in southeastern Cass County, Nebraska, United States. The population was 173 at the 2020 census.

Settlement in the vicinity began in 1855 along Weeping Water Creek, and the village was platted in 1887 when the Missouri Pacific Railroad was extended to the site. Limestone deposits near the village contain flint that was quarried by prehistoric peoples and traded widely across the Great Plains. Nehawka's log cabin public library, built in 1934 as a Civil Works Administration project, is listed on the National Register of Historic Places.

== History ==
The first permanent settlement in the vicinity was made in 1855 by Samuel M. Kirkpatrick, who came from Iowa and built a sawmill on Weeping Water Creek; other settlers took claims nearby. A town was platted in 1857, but no lots were sold and the plat was abandoned. A post office was approved under the name Nehawka in 1875. The name is derived from an Omaha and Otoe Indian name meaning "rustling water".

Sustained growth came in 1887, when the Missouri Pacific Railroad was extended to that point and a second plat was filed. By 1893 the community had roughly 200 residents and supported general stores, hotels, a bank, hardware and furniture stores, drug stores and a millinery. Nehawka became known regionally for its limestone quarries, its apple orchards, and the manufacture of concrete mixers.

=== Flint quarries ===
Flint nodules embedded in subsurface Pennsylvanian limestone near Nehawka were an important source of stone for tools and weapons among the region's prehistoric inhabitants. Artifacts recovered from the quarries date from roughly 5,000 to 500 years ago. The material, known as Nehawka flint, was used heavily by peoples of the Central Plains tradition, who occupied earthlodge settlements in eastern Nebraska and western Iowa from about 1000 to 1400 AD, and its appearance at dozens of sites indicates that it was an important trade commodity on the Great Plains. Several quarry pits survive north of the village, while others to the southwest were destroyed by limestone mining. A state historical marker describing the quarries stands in the village park at Main and Washington streets.

== Geography ==
Nehawka lies in southeastern Cass County, in the valley of Weeping Water Creek. According to the United States Census Bureau, the village has a total area of 0.23 square miles (0.60 km^{2}), all land.

== Demographics ==
Historical population
Census	Pop.	Note	%±
1930	298		—
1940	353		18.5%
1950	272		−22.9%
1960	262		−3.7%
1970	298		13.7%
1980	270		−9.4%
1990	260		−3.7%
2000	232		−10.8%
2010	204		−12.1%
2020	173		−15.2%
U.S. Decennial Census

=== 2020 census ===
As of the 2020 census there were 173 people and 77 households living in the village, a decline of about 15 percent from 2010. The population density was 762.1 inhabitants per square mile (294.2/km^{2}). There were 96 housing units at an average density of 422.9 per square mile (163.3/km^{2}), of which 77 (80.2%) were occupied and 19 (19.8%) were vacant. Of the occupied units, 69 (89.6%) were owner-occupied and 8 (10.4%) were renter-occupied.

The racial makeup of the village was 94.2% White, 1.2% Black or African American, 0.6% Asian, and 4.0% from two or more races. Hispanic or Latino people of any race were 1.2% of the population.

Of the 77 households, 40 were families and 37 were non-family households; 30 households consisted of a person living alone. Of the family households, 31 were married-couple families.

The median age in the village was 42.8 years. 38 residents (22.0%) were under the age of 18 and 42 (24.3%) were 65 years of age or older. The population was 91 male and 82 female.

=== 2010 census ===
As of the census of 2010, there were 204 people, 83 households, and 56 families living in the village. The population density was 887.0 inhabitants per square mile (342.5/km^{2}). There were 98 housing units at an average density of 426.1 per square mile (164.5/km^{2}). The racial makeup of the village was 99.0% White, 0.5% Native American, and 0.5% from two or more races. Hispanic or Latino of any race were 2.0% of the population.

There were 83 households, of which 32.5% had children under the age of 18 living with them, 57.8% were married couples living together, 6.0% had a female householder with no husband present, 3.6% had a male householder with no wife present, and 32.5% were non-families. 24.1% of all households were made up of individuals, and 13.2% had someone living alone who was 65 years of age or older. The average household size was 2.46 and the average family size was 2.91.

The median age in the village was 41.6 years. 24.5% of residents were under the age of 18; 7.5% were between the ages of 18 and 24; 23.6% were from 25 to 44; 28.5% were from 45 to 64; and 16.2% were 65 years of age or older. The gender makeup of the village was 48.5% male and 51.5% female.

=== 2000 census ===
As of the census of 2000, there were 232 people, 92 households, and 63 families living in the village. The population density was 1,028.6 inhabitants per square mile (397.1/km^{2}). There were 102 housing units at an average density of 452.2 per square mile (174.6/km^{2}). The racial makeup of the village was 96.12% White, 0.86% Native American, 0.43% from other races, and 2.59% from two or more races. Hispanic or Latino of any race were 1.72% of the population.

There were 92 households, out of which 32.6% had children under the age of 18 living with them, 57.6% were married couples living together, 8.7% had a female householder with no husband present, and 31.5% were non-families. 25.0% of all households were made up of individuals, and 14.1% had someone living alone who was 65 years of age or older. The average household size was 2.52 and the average family size was 3.08.

In the village, the population was spread out, with 29.3% under the age of 18, 4.7% from 18 to 24, 26.3% from 25 to 44, 25.4% from 45 to 64, and 14.2% who were 65 years of age or older. The median age was 37 years. For every 100 females, there were 84.1 males. For every 100 females age 18 and over, there were 84.3 males.

As of 2000 the median income for a household in the village was $40,875, and the median income for a family was $52,500. Males had a median income of $35,000 versus $21,750 for females. The per capita income for the village was $17,143. About 3.2% of families and 5.3% of the population were below the poverty line, including none of those under the age of eighteen and 13.8% of those 65 or over.

== Government ==
Nehawka is governed by a village board of trustees.

On August 27, 2026, the village board voted to prohibit data centers, cryptocurrency mining and blockchain computing operations, and associated power plants within Nehawka's zoning jurisdiction, with the ordinance taking effect 15 days later. News reports described the village as the first municipality in Nebraska to adopt an outright ban rather than a temporary moratorium. The vote followed a twelve-month moratorium on new data centers adopted by the Cass County commissioners on August 11, 2026, which did not extend to the village's zoning jurisdiction.

== Education ==
Nehawka is served by Conestoga Public Schools, a district headquartered in nearby Murray that also serves Union, Beaver Lake and Lake Waconda.

== Landmarks ==
The Nehawka Public Library, a log cabin–style building erected in 1934 as a Civil Works Administration project with donated materials and local fundraising, was listed on the National Register of Historic Places on December 5, 2002.

== Notable people ==
- Ernest M. Pollard, Congressman
- George L. Sheldon, 14th governor of Nebraska
