= John Claus Hubbard =

African-American attorney (1852–1907)

John Claus Hubbard (November 4, 1852 – November 4, 1907) was a prominent African-American political figure in Omaha, Nebraska's history. In 1886, he founded the first Black newspaper in Omaha and was the first recorded Black candidate to run for office in Nebraska. As an attorney, he defended many people of color in vagrancy cases. He was arrested for vagrancy himself and filed for a writ of habeas corpus in 1898.

== Life ==
Hubbard was born on November 4, 1852. No known historical records indicate the location of his birth or the names of his family members. He moved to Omaha in 1882 and made several community impacts throughout his career. During his residency in the city, Omaha faced racial tensions with its growing population. From 1880 to 1890, the city's Black population grew from 811 to 4,658. Laws were proposed, and some approved, restricting Black residents' right to vote, receive an education, and marry interracially. 1889 marked Omaha's first trial involving police brutality.

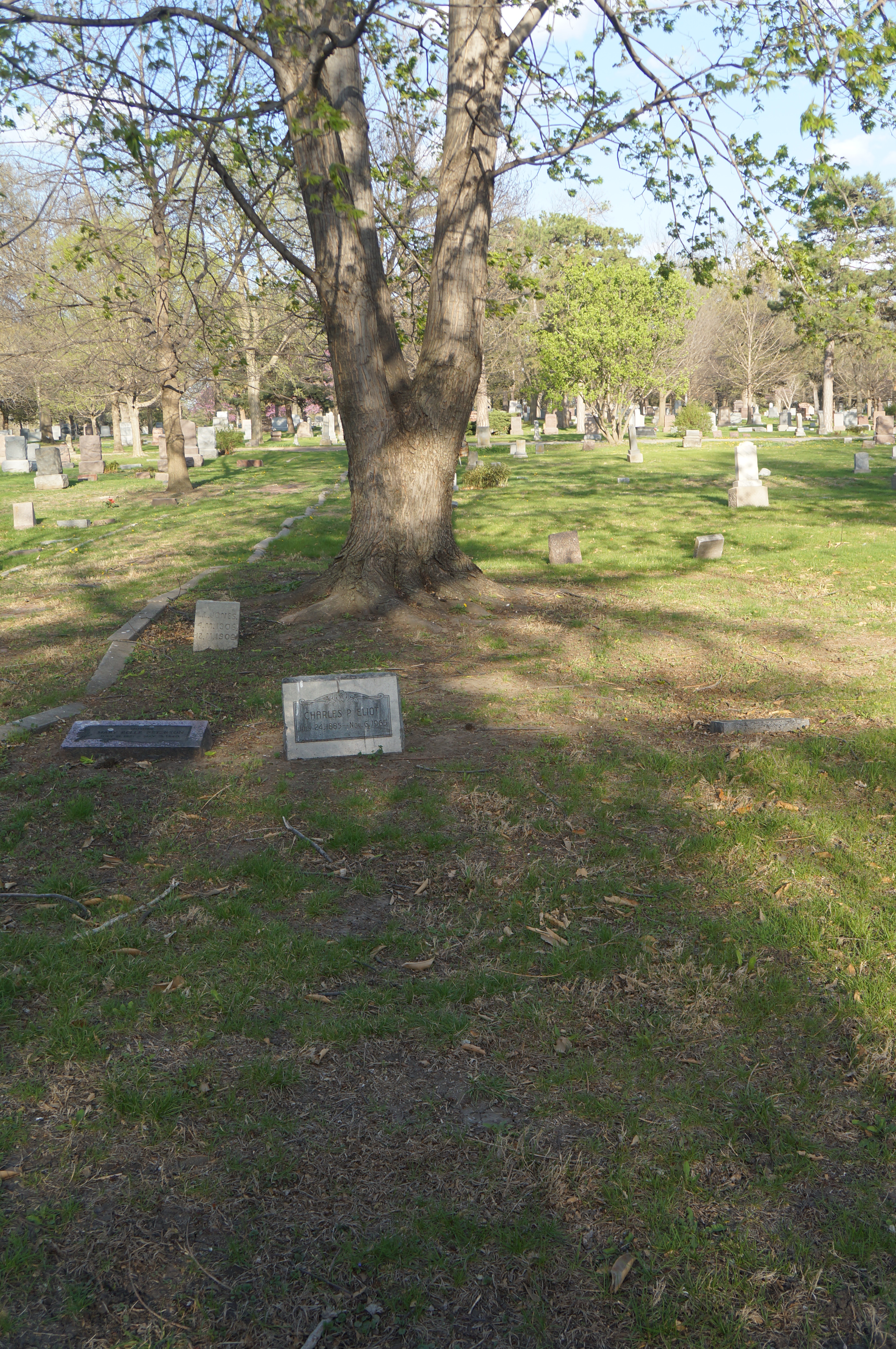
Final resting place of John Claus Hubbard: Wyuka Cemetery, Sec-1A, Sp-1012

In 1898, he experienced health issues and was later committed to the Nebraska Insane Hospital in 1906. At this time, the hospital held an institutional belief that mental illness was incurable. He died on November 4, 1907. His final resting place is located in Wyuka Cemetery; however, his grave remains unmarked.

== Career ==
Hubbard graduated from Oberlin College, one of the first universities to admit Black students. He continued his career by teaching school in St. Louis and other parts of the United States before moving to Omaha.

Hubbard started The Colored Advocate, Omaha's first Black newspaper, in 1886. In the nineteenth century, minorities were often restricted from occupations within Omaha's newspaper industry. The Omaha Daily Herald regularly ran an ad stating, "No colored man need apply." With the paper's founding, Hubbard intended it to "represent the colored people of Omaha" while giving "some sound and manly political advice to its patrons." Hubbard's The Colored Advocate paved the way for other Black newspapers to prosper: The Progress (1889–1906), The Afro-American Sentinel (1892–1925), and The Enterprise (1893–1920). During this time, Black newspapers were able to articulate the Black experience to American communities.

In the Third Ward of Omaha, he was often considered a key figure of political influence. The Omaha Daily Bee reported that Hubbard was the President of the Third Ward Colored Republican Club. Additionally, Omaha Daily Bee quoted Hubbard as stating, "[I have] made more out of politics in some months than some people have in years." Though Hubbard lost his 1889 legislative election, he was recorded as the first Black candidate to run for public office in Nebraska. Later in his career, he managed the campaign for the state legislature of Dr. Matthew Rickett.

Hubbard was a practicing attorney who primarily worked with cases involving persons of color under arrest. He protested the Chief of Police for the unlawful arrests of Black people, including his own arrest.

== Vagrancy Court Case ==
In 1898, Hubbard was arrested and taken to the Omaha City Jail. When questioned, the jailer first claimed that Hubbard was arrested for vagrancy, but later amended it to being a "suspicious character." The latter claim was not a charge under the eyes of the law. The police had a reputation for arresting individuals to get them to leave Omaha. Hubbard believed the arrest retaliation was against his actions as a political figure and attorney. He filed for a writ of habeas corpus on the grounds that he was wrongfully imprisoned.

Vagrancy laws in the United States were regularly found to target the characteristics of a person rather than their actions. Racial minorities, unemployed individuals, and civil rights protesters serve as examples of some of these targeted groups. The 1881 Nebraska § 787, Section 52 titled "Punishment of Disorderly Persons" stated: "To provide for the punishment of vagrants, tramps, common street beggars, common prostitutes, habitual disturbers of the peace, pick-pockets, gamblers..." One of the arguments during Hubbard's trial alleged that he fell under the "gambling" categorization.

His case began on November 26, 1898, and lasted until December 12 of the same year. The trial took place in the Douglas County District Court in Omaha and was heard by Judge Cunningham R. Scott. Judge Scott ruled on several other habeas corpus cases during this decade. Hubbard's attorney, Elmer E. Thomas, argued that Hubbard had been imprisoned without a warning or cause. This was one of Thomas's first habeas corpus cases within this jurisdiction. Hubbard denied any involvement with gambling and explained his belief that the arrest was retaliatory. The final ruling called for Hubbard's release, and the Court ordered: "inform the police officers present...that any policeman attempting the arrest of any citizen without due process of law virtually risks his life in his own hands."
