= Elmer Burkett =

American politician (1867–1935)

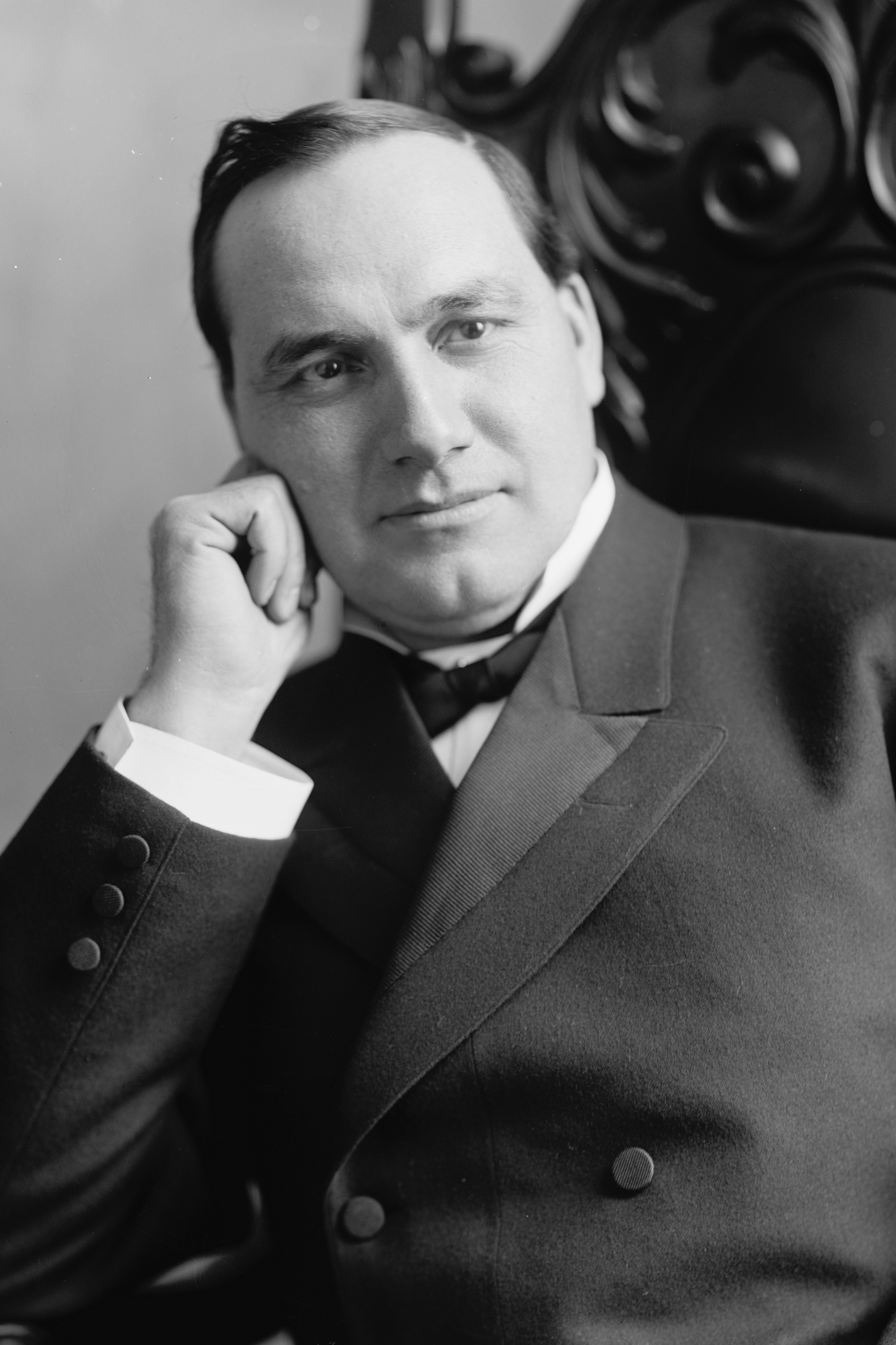
- Burkett, 1905–1935

United States Senator from Nebraska
- In office March 4, 1905 – March 3, 1911
- Preceded by: Charles H. Dietrich
- Succeeded by: Gilbert Hitchcock

Member of the U.S. House of Representatives from Nebraska's 1st district
- In office March 4, 1899 – March 4, 1905
- Preceded by: Jesse B. Strode
- Succeeded by: Ernest M. Pollard

Member of the Nebraska House of Representatives
- In office 1896–1898

Personal details
- Born: Elmer Jacob Burkett; December 1, 1867 Glenwood, Iowa, U.S.
- Died: May 23, 1935 (aged 67) Lincoln, Nebraska, U.S.
- Resting place: Wyuka Cemetery
- Party: Republican

Elmer Jacob Burkett (December 1, 1867 – May 23, 1935) was an American educator, lawyer and politician who served six terms as a representative and a senator from Nebraska from 1899 to 1911.

== Early life and career ==
Burkett was born on a farm near Glenwood, Iowa. He attended the public schools and graduated from Tabor College in 1890 and from the University of Nebraska College of Law in 1893. He served as principal of the Leigh, Nebraska, public schools from 1890 to 1892; he was admitted to the bar in 1893 and commenced practice in Lincoln, Nebraska. Burkett was a trustee of Tabor College from 1895 to 1905.

== Political career ==
He was a member of the Nebraska House of Representatives from 1896 to 1898.

=== Congress ===
Burkett was elected as a Republican to the Fifty-sixth, Fifty-seventh, and Fifty-eighth Congresses (March 4, 1899 – March 4, 1905); he was reelected to the Fifty-ninth Congress, but resigned, effective March 4, 1905, to become a senator.

== U.S. Senate ==
He was elected as a Republican to the United States Senate and served from March 4, 1905, to March 3, 1911. During his term, he served as the chairman of the Committee on Indian Depredations (Fifty-ninth Congress) and of the Committee on Pacific Railroads (Fifty-ninth Congress - after January 24, 1907 death of former Chairman Senator Russell A. Alger - and entirety of Sixtieth and Sixty-first Congresses).

Burkett was an unsuccessful candidate for renomination in 1910.

== Later career ==
He then resumed the practice of law in Lincoln; he declined the candidacy for Governor of Nebraska in 1912, and was also an unsuccessful candidate for the vice presidential nomination in 1912 after the death of incumbent James S. Sherman.

== Death and burial ==
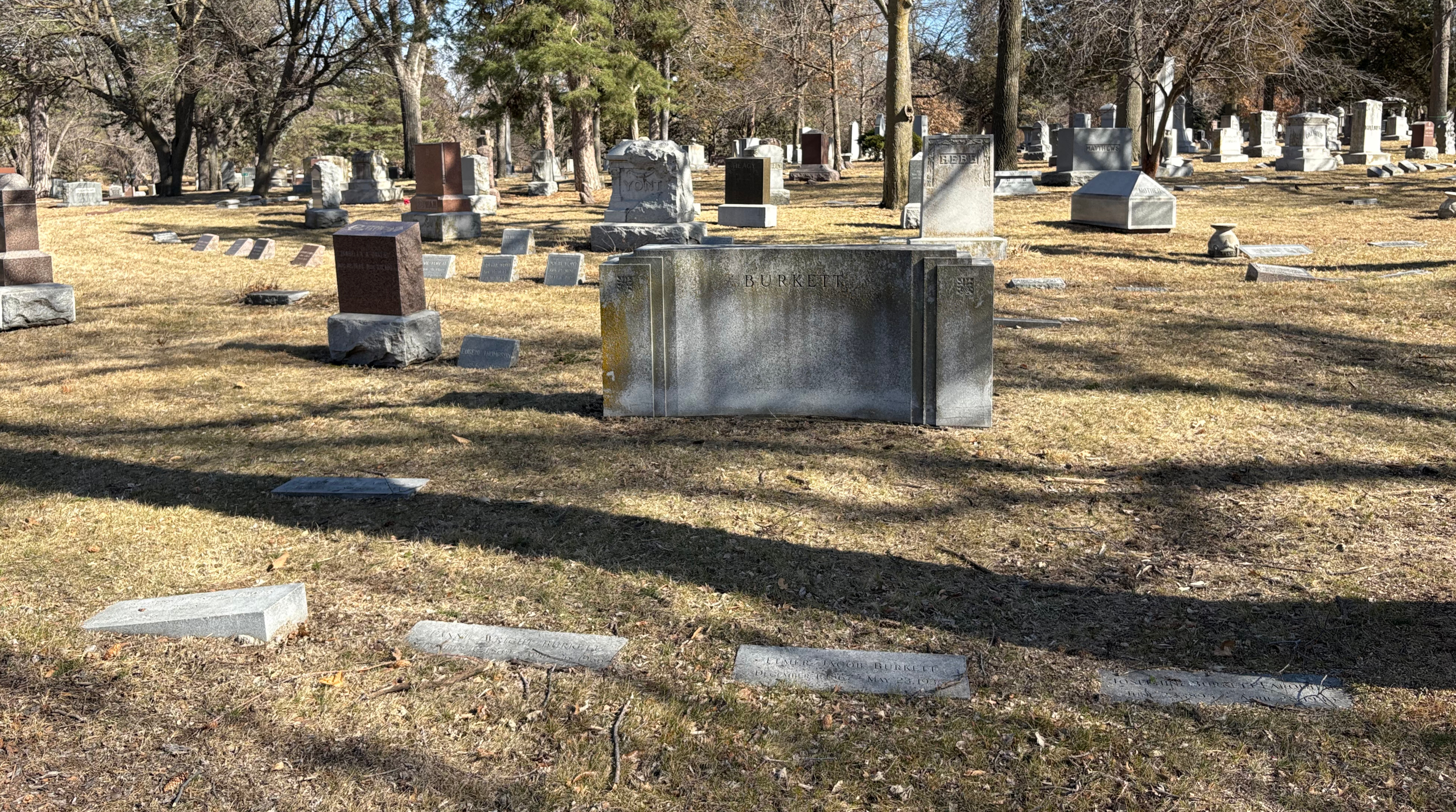
Burkett's grave at Wyuka Cemetery

He died in Lincoln on May 23, 1935, and was interred in Wyuka Cemetery.

U.S. House of Representatives
Preceded by Jesse Burr Strode	Member of the U.S. House of Representatives from Nebraska's 1st congressional district 1899–1905	Succeeded by Ernest M. Pollard
U.S. Senate
Preceded by Charles H. Dietrich	U.S. senator (Class 1) from Nebraska; 1905–1911; Served alongside: Joseph Millard, Norris Brown	Succeeded by Gilbert Hitchcock
