= Ernest M. Pollard =

American politician (1869–1939)

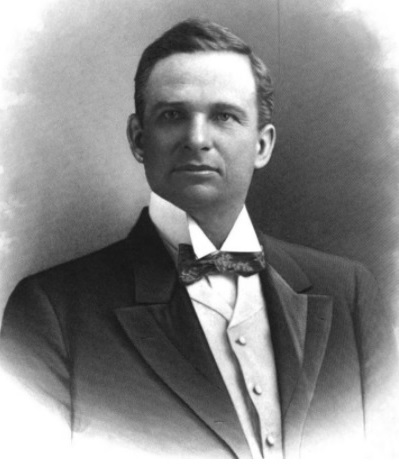

Member of the U.S. House of Representatives from Nebraska's 1st district
- In office July 18, 1905 – March 3, 1909
- Preceded by: Elmer Burkett
- Succeeded by: John A. Maguire

Personal details
- Born: April 15, 1869 Nehawka, Nebraska, U.S.
- Died: September 24, 1939 (aged 70) Lincoln, Nebraska, U.S.
- Party: Republican

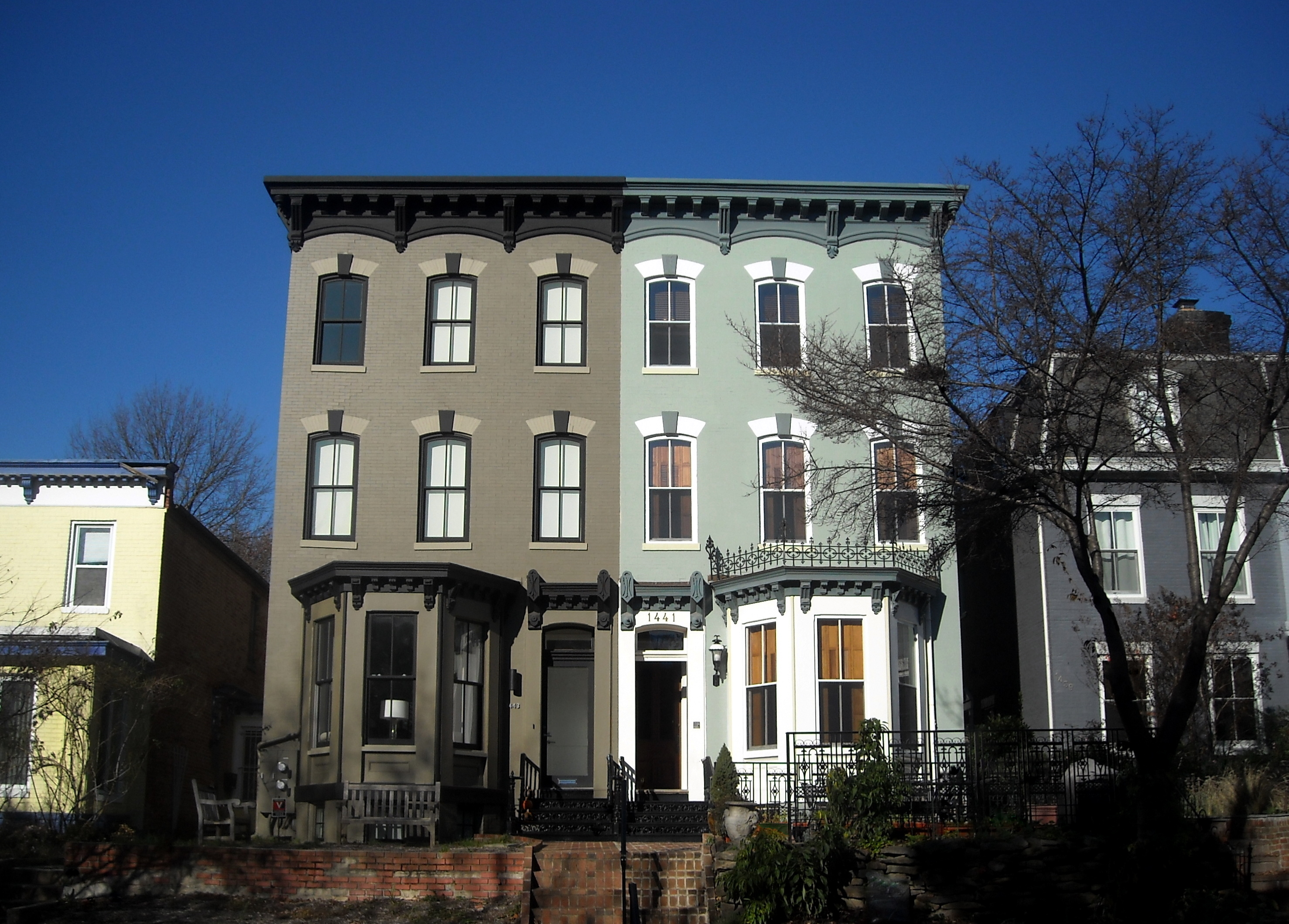
Pollard's former residence (right), located in the Logan Circle neighborhood of Washington, D.C.

Ernest Mark Pollard (April 15, 1869 – September 24, 1939) was an American Republican Party politician.

He was born in Nehawka, Nebraska on April 15, 1869, and graduated from University of Nebraska in 1893. He farmed near Nehawka until he was elected to the Nebraska State house of representatives in 1896. He served until 1899 and then became president of the Nebraska Republican League in 1900.

In 1905 he was elected to the Fifty-ninth United States Congress after the resignation of Elmer J. Burkett who had been elected to the United States Senate. He was reelected to the Sixtieth United States Congress but failed in his 1908 bid for reelection to the Sixty-first United States Congress.

He farmed some and was a delegate to the 1912 Republican National Convention and a member of the Nebraska constitutional convention in 1920 and 1921. He moved to Lincoln, Nebraska and was appointed secretary of the State department of welfare and labor by Nebraska Governor Arthur J. Weaver in January 1929 serving until January 1931. He died there on September 24, 1939, and is buried in Mount Pleasant Cemetery in Nehawka.

U.S. House of Representatives
Preceded by Elmer J. Burkett (R)	Member of the U.S. House of Representatives from Nebraska's 1st congressional district July 18, 1905 – March 3, 1909	Succeeded by John A. Maguire (D)
