= Elizabeth Hawley Everett =

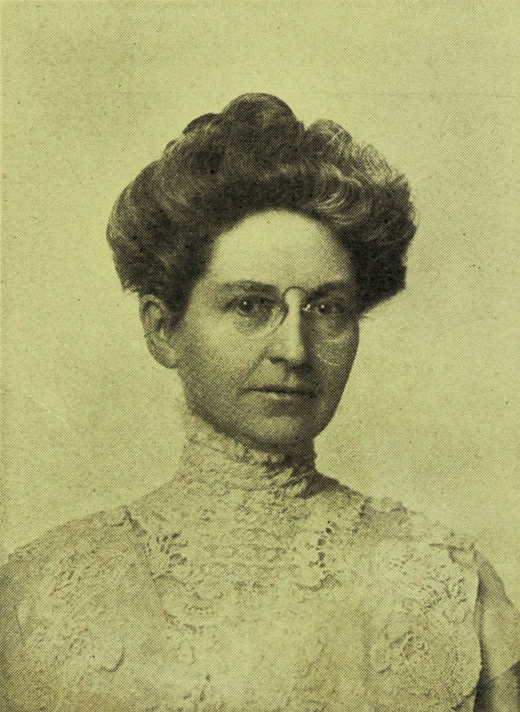
- Photo in Illinois Club Bulletin, 1909

Superintendent of schools, Highland Park, Illinois
- In office 1894–1898

Personal details
- Born: Elizabeth Caldwell Wilkey Hawley; August 23, 1857 Pekin, Illinois, U.S.
- Died: September 6, 1940 (aged 83) Highland Park, Illinois, U.S.
- Resting place: Wyuka Cemetery, Lincoln, Nebraska, U.S.
- Spouses: James Albert Bowen (m. 1881; div. 1885); Francis Dennison Everett (m. 1899; died 1937)
- Children: George Hawley Bowen
- Parents: William Caldwell Hawley; Mary Shuah (Nason) Hawley
- Education: University of Nebraska
- Occupation: clubwoman; suffragist; author; newspaper founder, editor; school principal; superintendent of schools

Elizabeth Hawley Everett (née, Hawley; after first marriage, Bowen; after second marriage, Everett; August 23, 1857 – September 6, 1940) was an American clubwoman, suffragist, and author. She served as a school principal and a superintendent of schools, and later, was a newspaper founder and editor. She published Hawley and Nason ancestry including the following contributory lines: Welles, Hollister, Treat, Boothe, Thompson, Caldwell, Staples, Tetherly, Coffin, Greenleaf, Brocklebank, Bartlett, Heard, McLellan, Patterson in 1929.

== Early life and education ==
Elizabeth Caldwell Wilkey Hawley was born in Pekin, Illinois, August 23, 1857. Her parents were William Caldwell Hawley (1830-1918) and Mary Shuah (Nason) Hawley (1829-1909). Her siblings were: Martha Nason, William Norman, George Appleton, Gideon Leonard, and Nathaniel Nason.

She was educated in the schools of Mount Pleasant, Iowa, including the Mt. Pleasant Ladies' Seminary. She also attended the University of Nebraska.

== Career ==
She served as principal of the Everett and Prescott Schools of Lincoln, Nebraska, 1887–94. In 1894–98, she was the superintendent of schools of Highland Park, Illinois. Everett was also active in Bible school work.

For fifteen years, she stood for equal suffrage and spoke for it frequently. She was a member of the American Com. YWCA, 1901–06; vice-president, Highland Park Public Library Board, and was a member of the board from 1904; recording secretary, Illinois Equal Suffrage Association; president, Ossoli Club of Highland Park, 1900–02; vice-president, Illinois Federation of Women's Clubs, 1906–08; president, Illinois Federation of Women's Clubs, 1908–10; General Federation of Women's Clubs (secretary, Illinois), 1910–12.

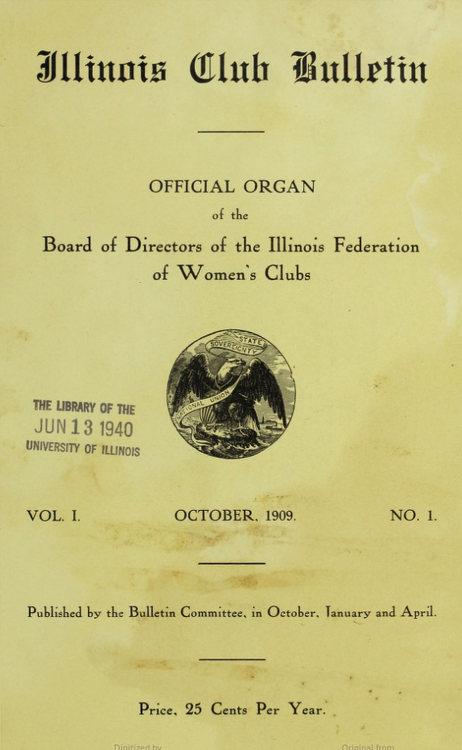
Illinois Club Bulletin, Oct. 1909, Vol. 1, No. 1.

Everett founded the Illinois Club Bulletin in 1909, as the official organ of the board of directors of the Illinois Federation of Women's Clubs, and edited it three years.

She was the author of Hawley and Nason ancestry including the following contributory lines: Welles, Hollister, Treat, Boothe, Thompson, Caldwell, Staples, Tetherly, Coffin, Greenleaf, Brocklebank, Bartlett, Heard, McLellan, Patterson. (Chicago, R.F. Seymour, 1929)

== Personal life ==
She was twice married. First, on September 13, 1881, at Lincoln, Nebraska, she married James Albert Bowen (b. 1849); they divorced in 1885. Their only child was George Hawley Bowen (1882-1926). Second, on March 2, 1899, she married Francis Dennison Everett (1839-1937), a businessman of Chicago.

In religion, she was Presbyterian.

== Death and legacy ==
Elizabeth Hawley Everett died September 6, 1940, at Highland Park, Illinois, and was buried at Hawley Plot, Wyuka Cemetery, Lincoln, Nebraska.

Her stories, records, and reflections were posthumously gathered in The olden time : stories for Betty, by Elizabeth Hawley Everett, Amanda Carson Bank, and Diane Banks (Philadelphia : Xlibris, 2005).

== Selected works ==
- Hawley and Nason ancestry including the following contributory lines: Welles, Hollister, Treat, Boothe, Thompson, Caldwell, Staples, Tetherly, Coffin, Greenleaf, Brocklebank, Bartlett, Heard, McLellan, Patterson., 1929
