= Nehawka Public Library =

- U.S. National Register of Historic Places
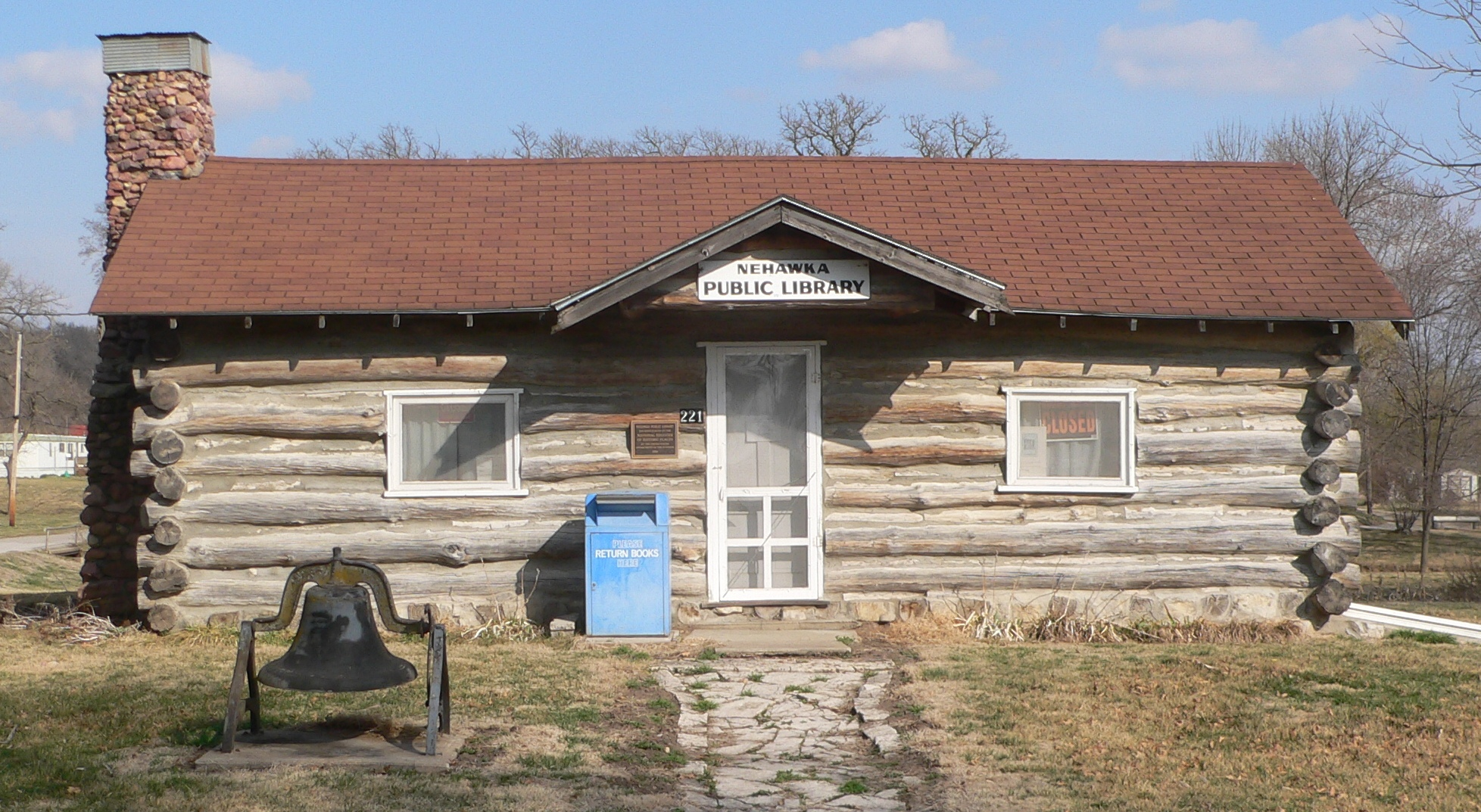

- Location within Nebraska Location within the United States
- Location: Jct. of Elm and Master Sts., Nehawka, Nebraska
- Coordinates: 40.82905092949226°N 95.9885598715406°W
- Area: less than one acre
- Built: 1934
- Built by: Civil Works Administration
- Architectural style: Log cabin
- NRHP reference No.: 02001481
- Added to NRHP: December 5, 2002

The Nehawka Public Library in Nehawka, Nebraska was listed on the National Register of Historic Places in 2002.

It is a log cabin-style building which was built as a Civil Works Administration project in 1934.

It is located at the southeast corner of Elm Street and Maple Avenue in Nehawka.
