= Nebraska Holocaust Memorial =

Coordinates: 40°49′06″N 96°39′40″W

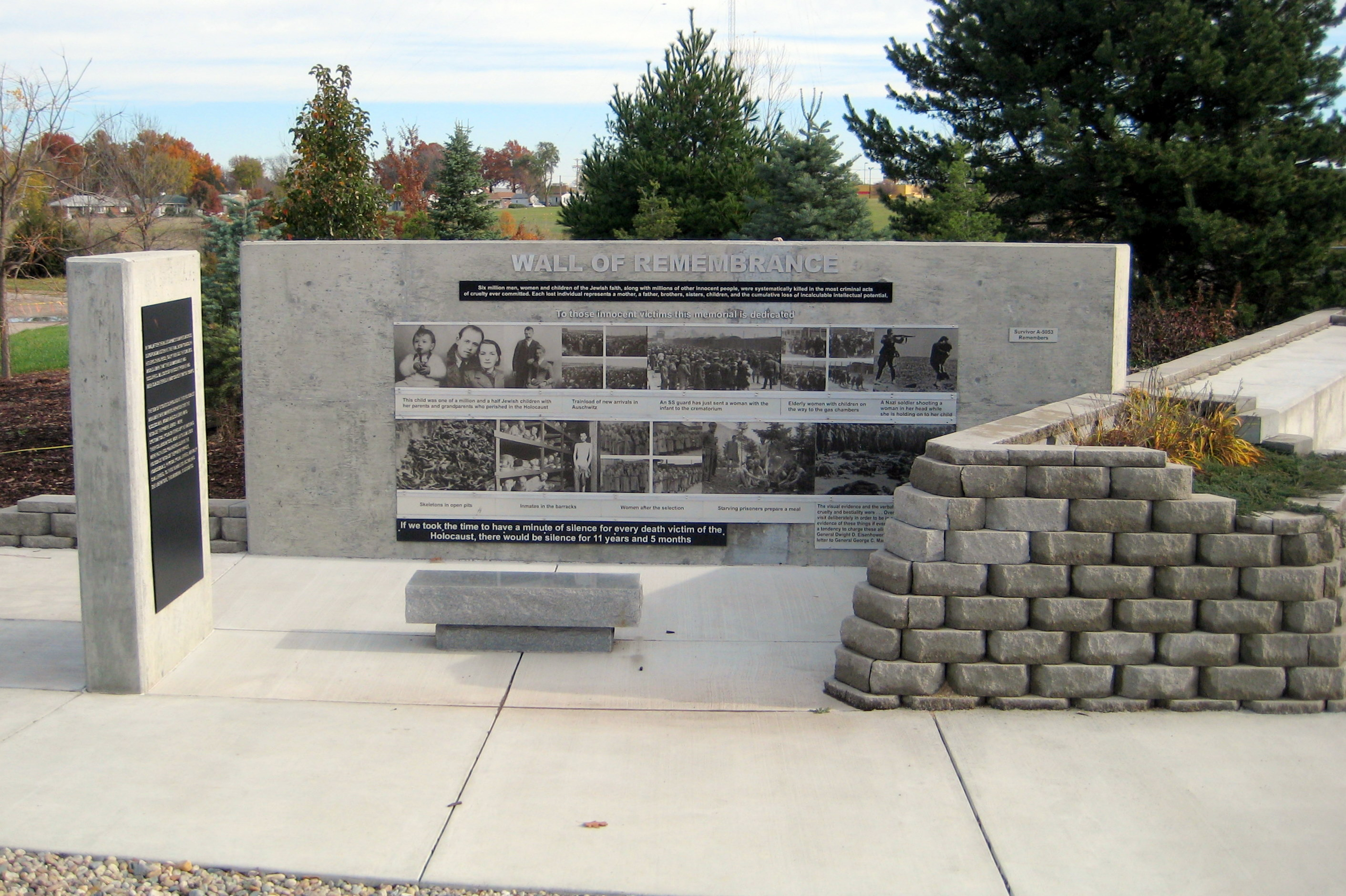

The Nebraska Holocaust Memorial is in Wyuka Cemetery in Lincoln, Nebraska, United States. It was dedicated on April 15, 2007 and serves for remembrance and education. This memorial is dedicated to the men, women, and children murdered in the Holocaust by Nazi Germany during World War II. This memorial also honors the survivors and liberators of the Holocaust.

The memorial did not use any state funds for its creation. Almost 1000 donors contributed to the memorial and education programs.

Within the Memorial is a set of stones that surround the "Star of Remembrance" monument. These stones represent the 11 million people who were murdered by the Nazis and their allies. Within the "Sea of Stones" are bricks with the names of individuals murdered in the Holocaust. Other sections of the Memorial include the "Wall of Remembrance" with pictures from the Holocaust and a Butterfly Garden in memory of the one and a half million children murdered in the Holocaust.

Nebraska picked the memorial to be in this cemetery because it is the nation's only state cemetery, and, though located in Lincoln, Nebraska, represents the entire state. Rich, poor, famous and infamous individuals killed in all the nation's wars (including the Civil War), as well as former slaves, are buried at Wyuka.

To see other Holocaust memorial locations throughout the world, see: List of Holocaust memorials and museums.

== Star of Remembrance ==
The Star of Remembrance is 16 feet (4.9 m) tall and features two triangular frames forming a three-dimensional star. Images represent isolation, deportation, and extermination, the three stages of the Nazi war against humanity.

Side 1 depicts people from all age groups and social classes across Europe, representing a time before the Holocaust. Side 2 depicts pictures of some individuals fading as a representation of being taken by force from their daily lives. Side 3 depicts the fading of all images, representing loss of the lives of over 11 million people.

== Butterfly Garden ==
The bricks in the Butterfly Garden and in front of the concrete bleachers with etched names represent names of donors who have donated at least $100 to the memorial and related education programs. Many schools visit the memorial and some have purchased bricks. It is hoped that all Nebraska middle schools and high schools with eventually purchase bricks in the garden to show support.

== Awards ==
In 2011 the Nebraska Holocaust Museum received the Rising Star Award from the Nebraska Land Foundation on Holocaust Remembrance Day, which is May 1.

== Gallery ==
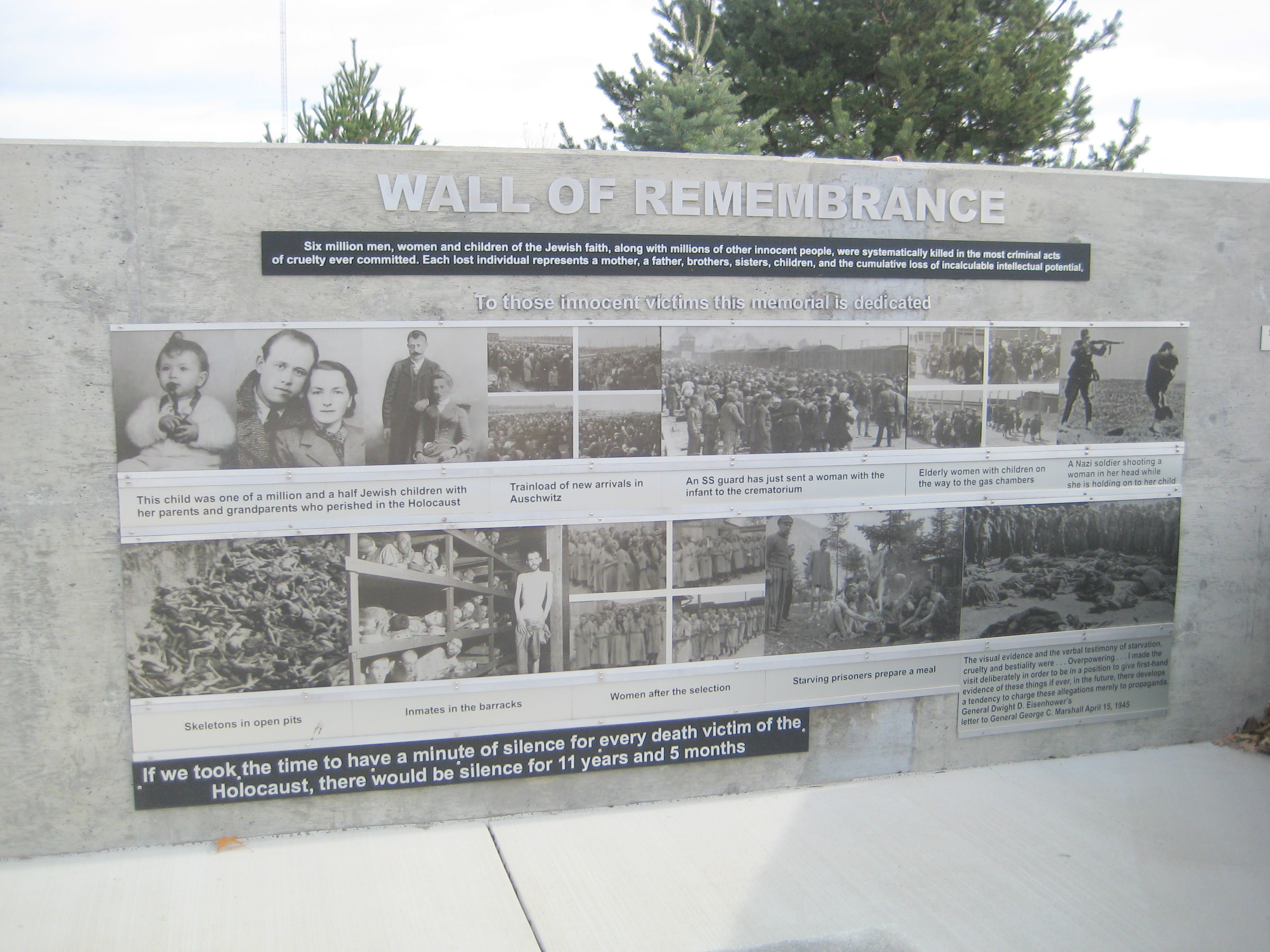
Wall of Remembrance

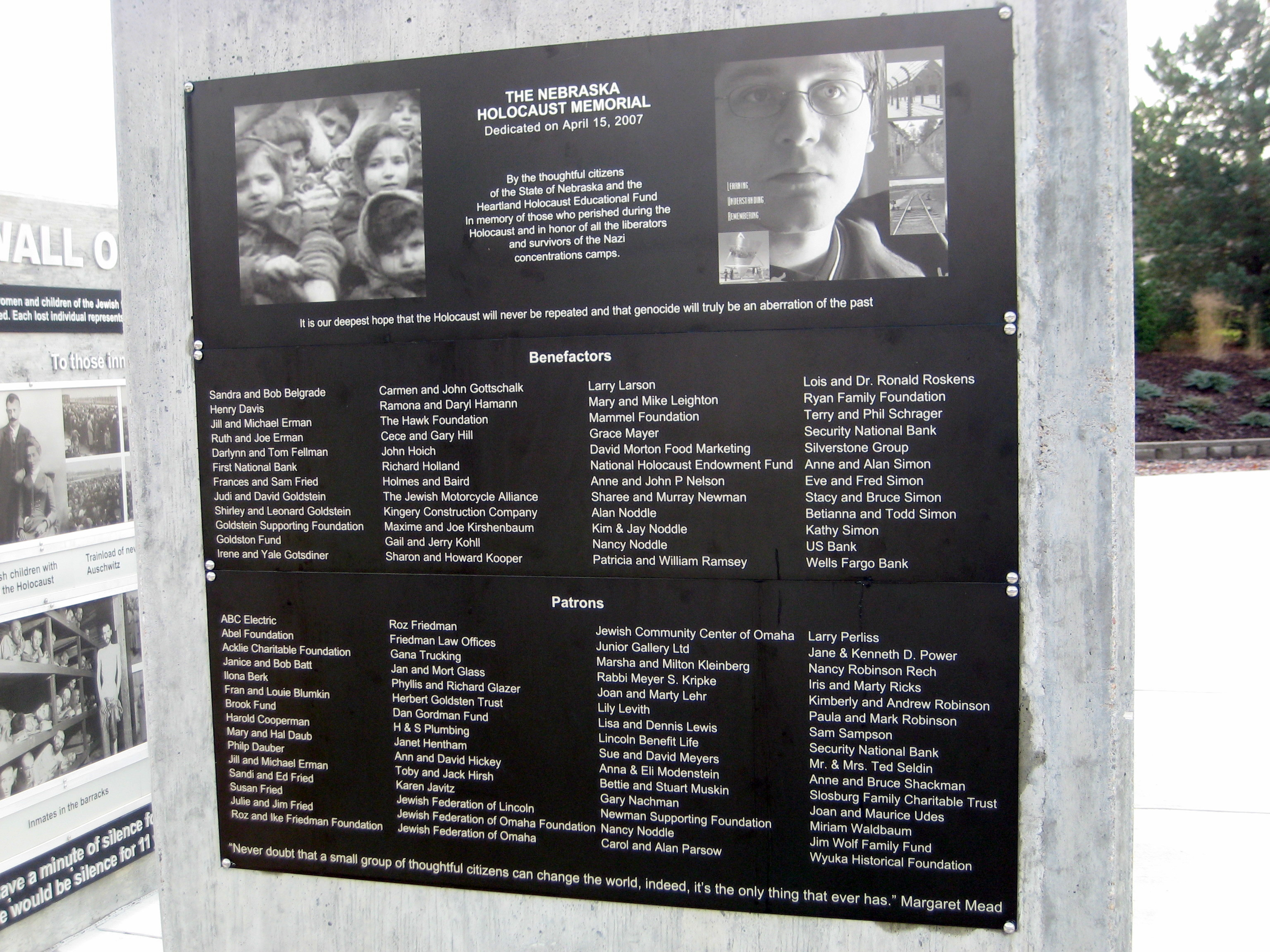
Initial Donors

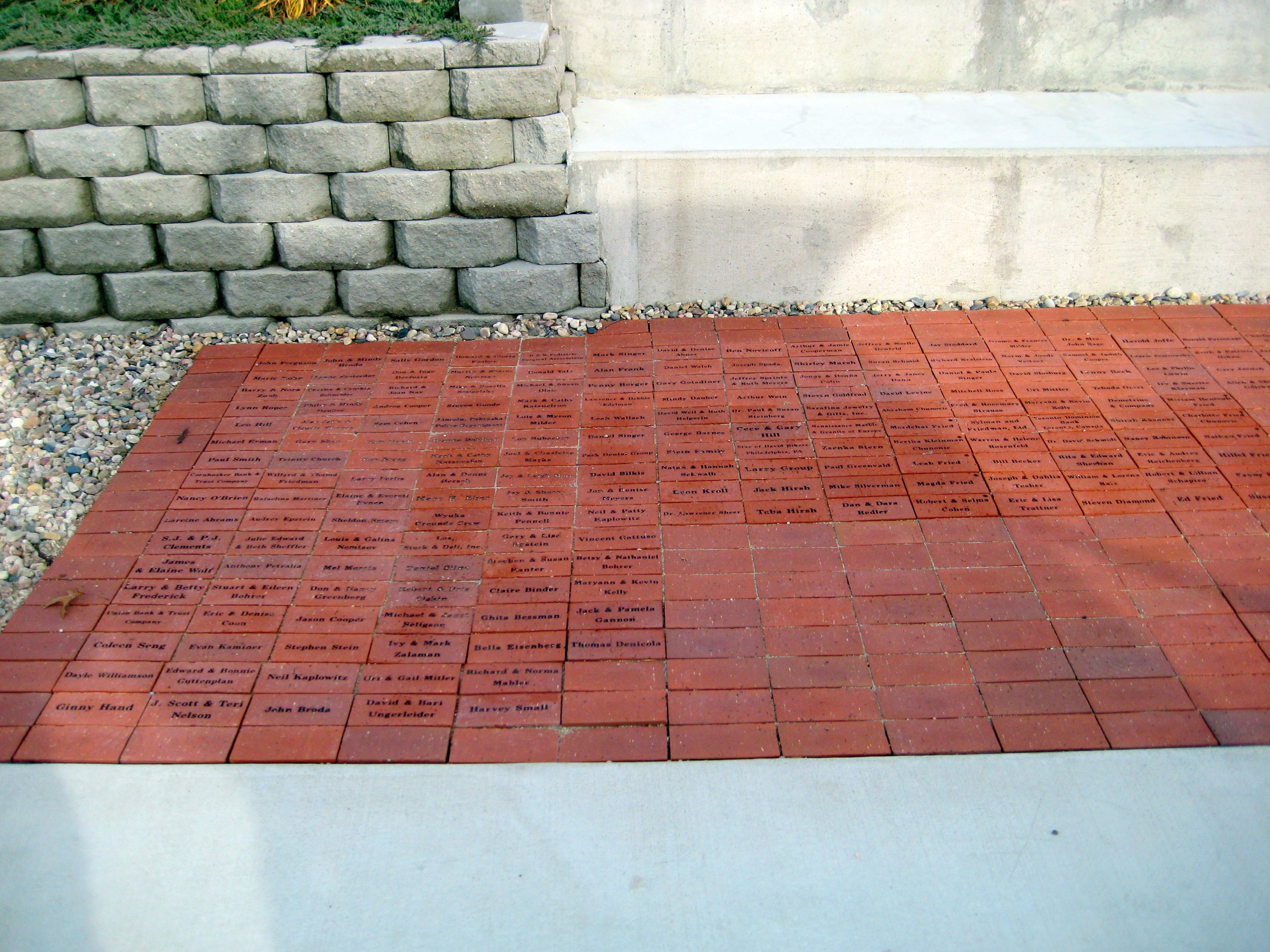
Sea of Stones
