= Jesse B. Strode =

American politician (1845–1924)

Jesse Burr Strode
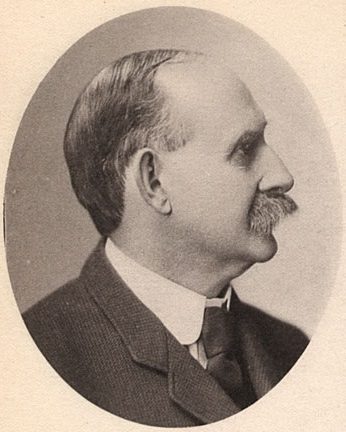
- from 1904's Nebraskans, 1854-1904 published by the Omaha Bee

Member of the U.S. House of Representatives from Nebraska's 1st district
- In office March 4, 1895 – March 3, 1899
- Preceded by: William Jennings Bryan
- Succeeded by: Elmer Burkett

Personal details
- Born: February 18, 1845 Fulton County, Illinois, U.S.
- Died: November 10, 1924 (aged 79) Lincoln, Nebraska, U.S.
- Party: Republican

Jesse Burr Strode (February 18, 1845 – November 10, 1924) was an American Republican Party politician.

== Biography ==
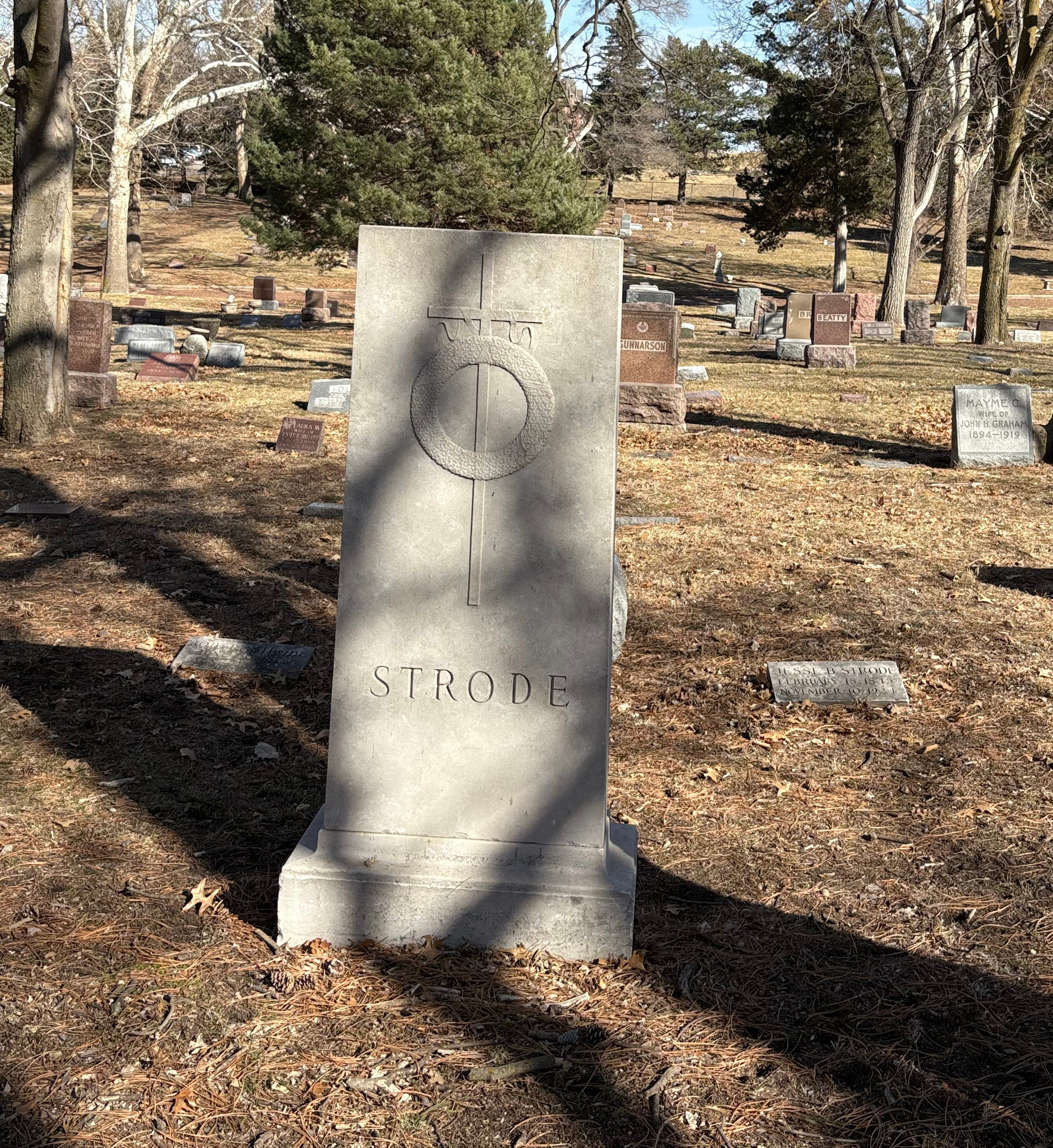
Strode's grave at Wyuka Cemetery

He was born in Fulton County, Illinois on February 18, 1845, and graduated from Abingdon College in Abingdon, Illinois (which was later consolidated with Eureka College). During the American Civil War he enlisted in Company G, Fiftieth Regiment, of the Illinois Volunteer Infantry serving from September 10, 1861, to the end of the war.

He returned to Abingdon first becoming principal of the schools from 1865 to 1873, being elected councilman six times and mayor twice. He moved to Plattsmouth, Nebraska and studied law passing the bar in and set up practice there in 1879. He was a district attorney from 1882 to 1888, moving to Lincoln, Nebraska in 1887. He was a district court judge in 1892. He was elected to the Fifty-fourth United States Congress and reelected to the Fifty-fifth United States Congress as a representative for the 1st district of Nebraska. He did not run for reelection in 1898, returning to Nebraska to become prosecuting attorney for the third district of Nebraska. He then became department commander of the Grand Army of the Republic in 1919 and 1920. He died in Lincoln on November 10, 1924, and is buried in Wyuka Cemetery.

U.S. House of Representatives
Preceded by William Jennings Bryan (D)	Member of the U.S. House of Representatives from Nebraska's 1st congressional district March 4, 1895 – March 3, 1899	Succeeded by Elmer J. Burkett (D)
