= John A. Maguire =

American politician (1870–1939)

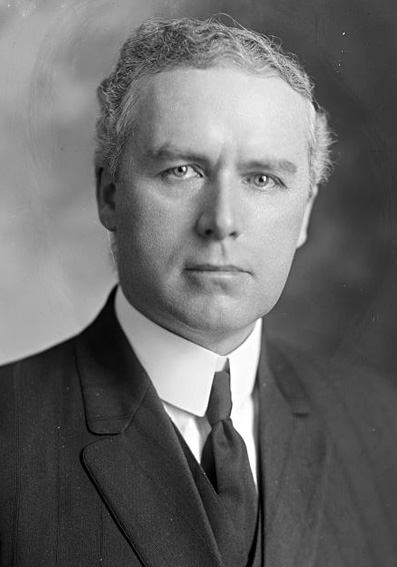

Member of the U.S. House of Representatives from Nebraska's 1st district
- In office March 4, 1909 – March 3, 1915
- Preceded by: Ernest M. Pollard
- Succeeded by: C. Frank Reavis

Personal details
- Born: November 29, 1870 Elizabeth, Illinois, US
- Died: July 1, 1939 (aged 68) Lincoln, Nebraska, US
- Party: Democratic

John Arthur Maguire (November 29, 1870 – July 1, 1939) was an American Democratic Party politician.

== Biography ==
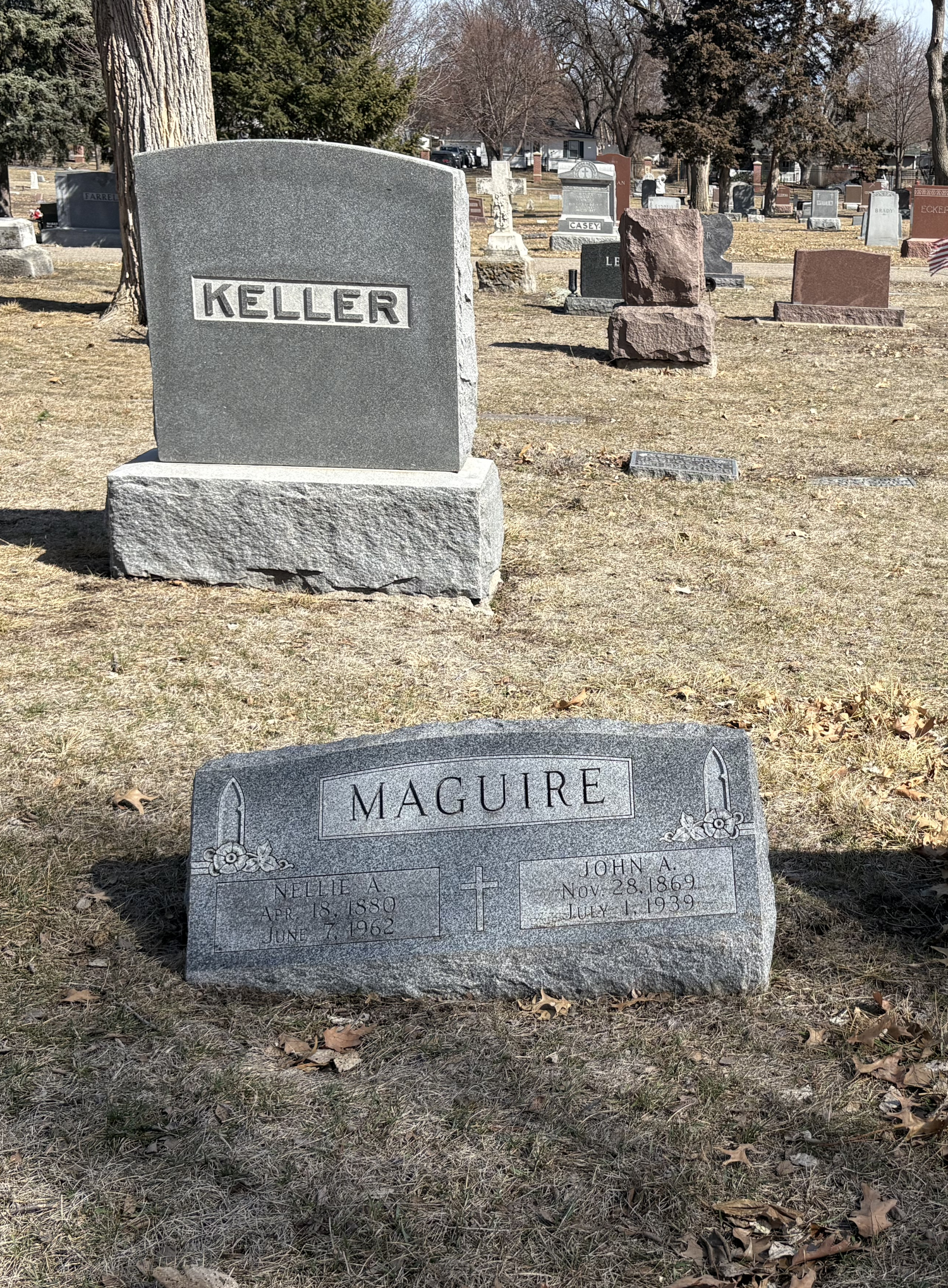
Maguire's grave at Calvary Cemetery

He was born near Elizabeth, Illinois on November 29, 1870, and moved to the Dakota Territory in 1882 with his parents settling near what is now Plankinton, South Dakota. He graduated from Plankinton High School in 1889 and attended the Agricultural College in Brookings, South Dakota from 1890 to 1893. He graduated from the Iowa State College of Agriculture (now Iowa State University) at Ames, Iowa in 1893 and the University of Nebraska College of Law in 1899.

He was deputy treasurer of Lancaster County, Nebraska from 1899 to 1901, also passing the bar in 1899. He set up practice in Lincoln, Nebraska in 1902. He was a delegate to the 1904 Democratic National Convention and the secretary to the Democratic State committee in 1905.

He was elected in 1909 to the Sixty-first United States Congress and reelected to the Sixty-second and Sixty-third Congresses. He ran unsuccessfully for reelection in 1914, returning then to his practice of law in Lincoln. He was appointed a municipal judge on January 1, 1938 and died on July 1, 1939. He is buried in Calvary Cemetery in Lincoln.

U.S. House of Representatives
Preceded by Ernest M. Pollard (R)	Member of the U.S. House of Representatives from Nebraska's 1st congressional district March 4, 1909 – March 3, 1915	Succeeded by C. Frank Reavis (R)
