= Temple of Congregation B'nai Jeshurun =

Reform synagogue in Lincoln, Nebraska, US

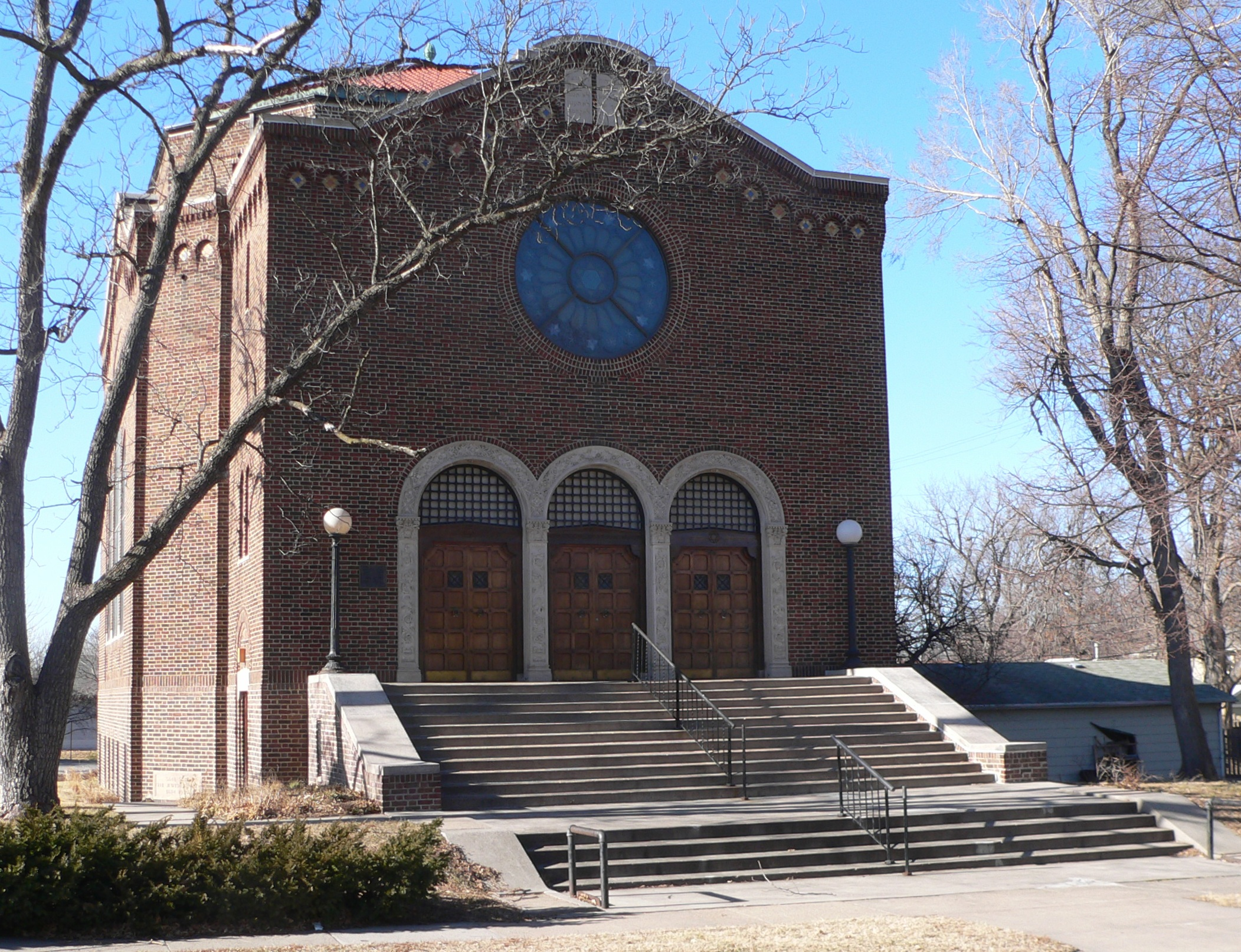
- South Street Temple in 2012

- Location in Nebraska

Religion
- Affiliation: Reform Judaism
- Ecclesiastical or organizational status: Synagogue
- Status: Active

Location
- Location: 2061 South 20th Street, Lincoln, Nebraska 68502
- Country: United States
- Interactive map of Temple of Congregation B'nai Jeshurun
- Coordinates: 40°47′31″N 96°41′32″W

Architecture
- Architect: Davis & Wilson
- Type: Synagogue
- Style: Byzantine Revival; Moorish Revival
- Established: 1885 (as a congregation)
- Completed: 1893 (12th and D Sts.); 1924 (South Street)
- Dome: One

Website
- southstreettemple.org
- Temple of Congregation B'nai Jeshurun
- U.S. National Register of Historic Places
- Area: less than one acre
- NRHP reference No.: 82003197
- Added to NRHP: June 25, 1982

Temple of Congregation B'nai Jeshurun, also known as South Street Temple, is an historic Reform Jewish congregation and synagogue located at 2061 South 20th Street, on the corner of Twentieth Street, in Lincoln, Nebraska, in the United States.

Founded in 1885, When it was built in 1923–1924, it replaced the old synagogue at 12th and D Streets completed in 1893. The main structure was designed in the Byzantine Revival and Moorish Revival styles by Davis & Wilson, and Meyer G. Gaba, a professor of mathematics at the University of Nebraska–Lincoln and congregant, designed the dome. Inside, the arch was designed by wood-carver Keats Lorenz. The first rabbi was Solomon Elihu Starrels.

The building was listed on the National Register of Historic Places on June 25, 1982.
