= List of the oldest buildings in Nebraska =

This article lists the oldest extant buildings in Nebraska, including extant buildings and structures constructed prior to and during the United States rule over Nebraska. Only buildings built prior to 1870 are suitable for inclusion on this list, or the building must be the oldest of its type.

In order to qualify for the list, a structure must:

- be a recognizable building (defined as any human-made structure used or intended for supporting or sheltering any use or continuous occupancy);
- incorporate features of building work from the claimed date to at least 1.5 metres (4.9 ft) in height and/or be a listed building.

This consciously excludes ruins of limited height, roads and statues. Bridges may be included if they otherwise fulfill the above criteria. Dates for many of the oldest structures have been arrived at by radiocarbon dating or dendrochronology and should be considered approximate. If the exact year of initial construction is estimated, it will be shown as a range of dates.

== List of oldest buildings ==
Building	Image	Location	First built	Use	Notes
Log Cabin (Bellevue, Nebraska)		Bellevue, Nebraska	ca. 1835	Residence	Fur trapper's log cabin; Likely oldest building in the state
Florence Mill		Omaha, Nebraska	ca. 1846	Commercial	Oldest mill in the state; construction overseen by Brigham Young
Willow Creek Pony Express Station		Cozad, Nebraska	ca. 1849	Commercial	Pony Express station, was moved a small distance in 1938
Didier Cabin		Brownville, Nebraska	ca. 1854	Residence	
Arbor Lodge		Nebraska City, Nebraska	ca. 1855	Residence	Built for the founder of Arbor Day, Julius Sterling Morton
Mayhew Cabin		Nebraska City, Nebraska	ca. 1855	Residence	One of the oldest houses in Nebraska City
Fontenelle Bank		Bellevue, Nebraska	ca. 1856	Commercial	Oldest bank building in the state
William Hamilton House		Bellevue, Nebraska	ca. 1856	Residence	
Bank of Florence		Omaha, Nebraska	ca. 1857	Commercial	Oldest building in Omaha
Frederick L. Gottschalk House		Columbus, Nebraska	ca. 1857	Residence	The cabin was relocated to the interior of the Platte County Historical Society Museum.
Taylor-Wessel-Bickel-Nelson House		Nebraska City, Nebraska	ca. 1857	Residence	One of the oldest houses in Nebraska City
Presbyterian Church		Bellevue, Nebraska	ca. 1858	Religious	
Russell, Majors, and Waddell Freighting Company Building		Nebraska City, Nebraska	ca. 1858	Commercial/ Residence	Built by the US Army and sold to the supply firm Russell, Majors, and Waddell
Russell, Majors, Waddell House		Nebraska City, Nebraska	ca. 1858	Residence	Built by Alexander Majors for Russell, Majors, and Waddell
Russell, Majors, Waddell-Stevenson House		Nebraska City, Nebraska	ca. 1858	Residence	Built by Alexander Majors for Russell, Majors, and Waddell
Brownville Methodist Church		Brownville, Nebraska	ca. 1859	Religious	Oldest brick church in Nebraska
Abbott Gates House		Brownville, Nebraska	ca. 1859	Residence	
Midway Stage Station		Dawson County, Nebraska	ca. 1859	Commercial/ Residence	
Stolley Homestead Site		Grand Island, Nebraska	ca. 1859	Residence	
8621 North 31st Street		Omaha, Nebraska	ca. 1859	Residence	Oldest house in Omaha; built within earlier Mormon settlement of Cutler's Park (Florence, Omaha).
Brown-Carson House		Brownville, Nebraska	ca. 1860	Residence	
Emmanuel Lutheran Church		Dakota City, Nebraska	ca. 1860	Religious	
George and Nancy Turner House		Fremont, Nebraska	ca. 1860	Residence	
St. Benedict's Catholic Church		Nebraska City, Nebraska	ca. 1861	Religious	Oldest brick Catholic church in the state
United Presbyterian Church		Nebraska City, Nebraska	ca. 1861	Religious	Originally a Presbyterian church then used by the Mormons
608 1st Avenue		Nebraska City, Nebraska	ca. 1861	Residence	
McLaughlin-Parks House		Brownville, Nebraska	ca. 1862	Residence	
Beehive House		Brownville, Nebraska	ca. 1863	Residence	
Heinrich Giese House		Grand Island, Nebraska	ca. 1863	Residence	
Worthing-Baker House		Brownville, Nebraska	ca. 1863	Residence	
Bratton-Minick House		Brownville, Nebraska	ca. 1864	Residence	
Jesse C. Bickle House		Crete, Nebraska	ca. 1864	Residence	
J. H. Catron House		Nebraska City, Nebraska	ca. 1865	Residence	
John Henry Stork Log House		Burt County, Nebraska	ca. 1865	Residence	
Otoe County Courthouse		Nebraska City, Nebraska	ca. 1865	Government	Oldest public building in the state
John Sautter Farmhouse		Papillion, Nebraska	ca. 1866	Residence	
George Stevens House		Brownville, Nebraska	ca. 1866	Residence	
Heritage House Museum		Weeping Water, Nebraska	ca. 1867	Residence	The former parsonage of the Congregational Church of Weeping Water
Palmer-Epard House		Gage County, Nebraska	ca. 1867	Residence	
Zweibel Farmstead		Sarpy County, Nebraska	ca. 1867	Residence	
Anthony P. Cogswell House		Brownville, Nebraska	ca. 1868	Residence	
Furnas House		Brownville, Nebraska	ca. 1868	Residence	Home of Governor Robert Wilkinson Furnas
John W. Bennett House		Nemaha County, Nebraska	ca. 1868	Residence	Oldest example of the I-House in the state
Lone Tree Saloon		Brownville, Nebraska	ca. 1868	Commercial	
Michael Witt Fachwerkbau		Saline County, Nebraska	ca. 1868	Residence	
St. John's Lutheran Church		Nemaha County, Nebraska	ca. 1868	Religious	Oldest stone church in Nebraska
Elm Creek Fort		Minden, Nebraska	ca. 1869	Residence	
Jasper A. Ware House		Nebraska City, Nebraska	ca. 1869	Residence	House of the co-founder of the Midland Pacific Railway, Jasper Ware
John L. Colhapp House		Brownville, Nebraska	ca. 1869	Residence	
Samuel Bullock House		Fremont, Nebraska	ca. 1869	Residence	
Thomas P. Kennard House		Lincoln, Nebraska	ca. 1869	Residence	One of oldest houses in Lincoln, NE
Tipton House		Brownville, Nebraska	ca. 1869	Residence	
122 South 6th Street		Plattsmouth, Nebraska	ca. 1869	Religious	
Christopher Anderson House		Nebraska City, Nebraska	ca. 1870	Residence	
Commanding Officers Quarters		Sidney, Nebraska	ca. 1870	Government/ Residence	
Congregational Church and Manse		Santee, Nebraska	ca. 1870	Religious	
Eli S. Wibley House		Brownville, Nebraska	ca. 1870	Residence	
Naomi Institute		Rock Bluff, Nebraska	ca. 1870	Education	
Cook house on Spade Ranch (Nebraska)		Ellsworth, Nebraska	ca. 1877	Ranch	One of the oldest and largest ranches in Nebraska; Cookhouse moved from Newman Ranch in 1888.
General Crook House		Fort Omaha	ca. 1879	Government	Home to Civil War/Indian Wars general

== See also ==
- National Register of Historic Places listings in Nebraska
- History of Nebraska
- List of the oldest buildings in the United States
