= National Register of Historic Places listings in Sarpy County, Nebraska =

Location of Sarpy County in Nebraska

Sarpy County, Nebraska, United States, has 20 properties and districts listed on the National Register of Historic Places. Another two properties were once listed but have been removed.

The locations of National Register properties and districts for which the latitude and longitude coordinates are included below may be seen in a map.

This National Park Service list is complete through NPS recent listings posted October 30, 2026.

== Current listings ==
	Name on the Register	Image	Date listed	Location	City or town	Description
1	Bellevue College Dormitories	Bellevue College Dormitories	July 24, 2017 (#100001357)	400 W. 19th Ave. 41°08′28″N 95°53′56″W	Bellevue	No longer extant.
2	Big Papillion Creek Bridge	Big Papillion Creek Bridge	June 29, 1992 (#92000728)	120th St. over the South Branch of Big Papillion Creek, 3.2 miles west of La Vista; 41°10′27″N 96°06′01″W	La Vista	Bridge replaced in 2000.
3	Blacksmith Shop		May 12, 1978 (#78001711)	South of Bellevue on Offutt Air Force Base; 41°07′11″N 95°55′24″W	Bellevue	
4	Champe-Fremont 1 Archeological Site		October 21, 1975 (#75001091)	Address restricted	Gretna	Extends into Douglas County.
5	Fontenelle Bank	Fontenelle Bank	April 16, 1969 (#69000136)	2212 Main St. 41°08′12″N 95°53′28″W	Bellevue	
6	Fontenelle Forest Historic District	Fontenelle Forest Historic District	January 21, 1974 (#74001139)	1111 Bellevue Blvd N. 41°10′47″N 95°55′04″W	Bellevue	
7	Fort Crook Historic District		December 12, 1976 (#76001139)	Southwest of Bellevue on Offutt Air Force Base; 41°07′23″N 95°55′21″W	Bellevue	
8	William E. Gordon House	William E. Gordon House	November 8, 2006 (#06000997)	711 Bellevue Boulevard, S. 41°09′14″N 95°53′58″W	Bellevue	
9	William Hamilton House	William Hamilton House	October 15, 1969 (#69000137)	2003 Bluff St. 41°08′21″N 95°53′17″W	Bellevue	
10	Kurz Omaha Village		August 14, 1973 (#73001073)	Address Restricted	Papillion	
11	Linoma Beach	Linoma Beach	March 11, 2003 (#03000107)	17106 S. 255th St. 41°03′44″N 96°19′08″W	Gretna	
12	Moses Merrill Mission and Oto Indian Village		March 16, 1972 (#72000757)	Address Restricted	La Platte	
13	Old Log Cabin	Old Log Cabin	October 16, 1970 (#70000376)	1805 Hancock St. 41°08′28″N 95°53′31″W	Bellevue	
14	Patterson Site		March 22, 2007 (#07000176)	Address Restricted; 41°02′33″N 96°15′15″W	South Bend	
15	Presbyterian Church	Presbyterian Church	October 15, 1970 (#70000377)	2002 Franklin St. 41°08′22″N 95°53′39″W	Bellevue	
16	Peter A. Sarpy Trading Post Site		June 10, 1975 (#75001102)	Address Restricted	Bellevue	
17	John Sautter Farmhouse	John Sautter Farmhouse	September 30, 1980 (#80002463)	220 N. Jefferson St. 41°09′28″N 96°02′29″W	Papillion	
18	Springfield Community Hall	Springfield Community Hall	July 23, 1998 (#98000893)	104 Main St. 41°04′56″N 96°08′04″W	Springfield	
19	Third Sarpy County Courthouse	Third Sarpy County Courthouse	July 5, 1990 (#90000964)	3rd St. between Washington and Jefferson Sts. 41°09′31″N 96°02′31″W	Papillion	
20	Zweibel Farmstead	Zweibel Farmstead	November 30, 2000 (#00001377)	16302 S. 63rd St. 41°04′29″N 96°00′42″W	Papillion	

== Former listing ==
	Name on the Register	Image	Date listed	Date removed	Location	City or town	Description
1	Burlington Depot		October 16, 1970 (#70000375)	April 13, 1987	Haworth Park	Bellevue	Relocated to Sarpy County Museum Grounds at Gemini Park
2	McCarty-Lilley House		December 22, 1978 (#78001712)	March 13, 2020	West of Bellevue on Quail Dr. 41°08′07″N 95°58′20″W	Bellevue	

== See also ==
- List of National Historic Landmarks in Nebraska
- National Register of Historic Places listings in Nebraska
