= Sarpy County Museum =

Museum in Nebraska

Coordinates: 41.1341°N 95.9060°W

The Sarpy County Museum is located at 2402 Clay St in Bellevue, Nebraska. The museum holds a collection of artifacts and historical resources, covering the history of Sarpy County, Nebraska, including Bellevue, Gretna, La Vista, Papillion, and Springfield. The museum includes the history of fur traders and missionaries, period rooms, early agricultural pursuits, and a scale model of Fort Crook, which later became Offutt Air Force Base.

== History of the Museum ==
The Sarpy County Historical Society was formed during the Great Depression. Later, during the 1960s, a “storefront museum” was formed, having a few shelves of artifacts on display. During the late 1970s, the museum’s current building was built. The museum chronicles the history of the county from its origins as a fur trading post to the present day.

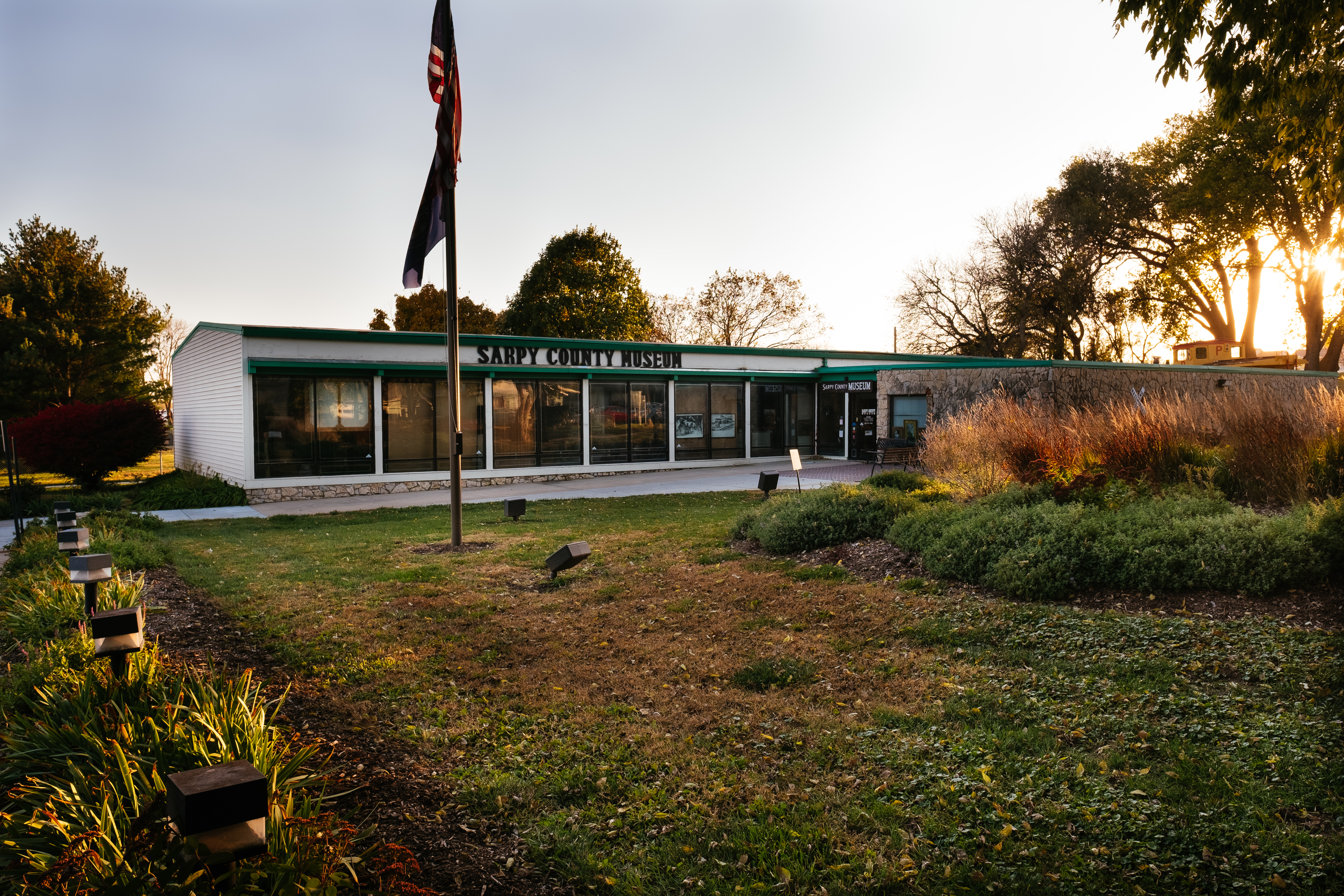

== Collections ==
The period room exhibits depict the lifestyles of the 19th and 20th centuries.

The scale model of Fort Crook displays what the fort looked like prior to creation of the Glenn L. Martin Bomber Plant and the Strategic Air Command. The Fort later became Offutt Air Force Base.

The museum has many historically and culturally significant documents from Sarpy County. Its collections include church histories, newspapers, and photographs. Related to genealogy it holds school, naturalization, and marriage records. Also at the museum are early correspondence between County officials and leading citizens.

Tours of historical sites of Sarpy County are available hosted by the museum. There are four sites available, including the Omaha and Southern Railroad Depot, the Old Presbyterian Church, the Old Log Cabin, the Moses Merrill Mission and the Fontenelle Bank. The first site is an 1869 Omaha and Southern Railroad Depot, which is located on the museum’s property. The Old Presbyterian Church built in 1856, still in service today, featuring stained glass windows and 1800s oak pews. This is the oldest church in Bellevue still intact. The Log Cabin built in the 1830s hosted the first twins born in Nebraska Territory. The Fontenelle Bank is the first and the oldest commercial public building in Nebraska history, still includes the original walk-in vault, an 1870 Accountant’s Desk, and more.
