= Schneider House =

Schneider House may refer to:

in Canada

- Schneider Haus, a museum in Kitchener, Ontario

in the United States

- Charles W. Schneider House, St. Paul, Minnesota, listed on the National Register of Historic Places (NRHP)
- R. B. Schneider House, Fremont, Nebraska, NRHP-listed
- Schneider's Opera House, Snyder, Nebraska, NRHP-listed
- Frederick Schneider House, Erie, Pennsylvania, NRHP-listed

== See also ==
- Schneider Triangle, Washington, DC, NRHP-listed, a set of houses
- Henry Schneider Building, Springfield, Missouri, NRHP-listed
- J. P. Schneider Store, Austin, Texas, NRHP-listed
- Schneider Hotel, Pampa, Texas, NRHP-listed in Gray County
