= National Register of Historic Places listings in Dodge County, Nebraska =

Location of Dodge County in Nebraska

Dodge County, Nebraska, United States, has 23 properties and districts listed on the National Register of Historic Places.

The locations of National Register properties and districts for which the latitude and longitude coordinates are included below may be seen in a map.

This National Park Service list is complete through NPS recent listings posted October 30, 2026.

== Current listings ==
	Name on the Register	Image	Date listed	Location	City or town	Description
1	Barnard Park Historic District	Barnard Park Historic District	July 12, 1990 (#90001053)	Bounded by 4th, 8th, and Union Sts. and Platte Ave. 41°26′04″N 96°29′23″W	Fremont	
2	Samuel Bullock House	Samuel Bullock House	September 12, 1985 (#85002147)	508 W. Military Ave. 41°26′10″N 96°30′08″W	Fremont	
3	Dodge County Courthouse	Dodge County Courthouse	January 10, 1990 (#89002208)	435 N. Park Ave. 41°26′00″N 96°29′51″W	Fremont	
4	Charles T. Durkee House	Charles T. Durkee House	August 10, 2011 (#11000528)	1125 N. Broad St. 41°26′24″N 96°29′54″W	Fremont	
5	Fremont Historic Commercial District	Fremont Historic Commercial District	February 17, 1995 (#95000091)	Roughly bounded by 3rd, Military, Park, and D Sts. 41°26′01″N 96°29′47″W	Fremont	
6	Fremont Municipal Auditorium	Fremont Municipal Auditorium	July 11, 2002 (#02000773)	925 Broad St. 41°26′17″N 96°29′54″W	Fremont	
7	Fremont Municipal Power Plant and Pumping Station	Fremont Municipal Power Plant and Pumping Station	July 11, 2002 (#02000772)	8th St. and Park Ave. 41°26′11″N 96°29′47″W	Fremont	
8	Harder Hotel	Harder Hotel	November 27, 1989 (#89002046)	503 Main St. 41°40′00″N 96°39′57″W	Scribner	
9	Hooper Historic District	Hooper Historic District	May 8, 1980 (#80002445)	Main, Elk, Fulton, and Myrtle Sts. 41°36′41″N 96°32′51″W	Hooper	
10	Christopher Knoell Farmstead	Christopher Knoell Farmstead	January 13, 1983 (#83001089)	Northwest of Fremont; 41°29′32″N 96°32′53″W	Fremont	
11	Love-Larson Opera House	Love-Larson Opera House	September 10, 1974 (#74001107)	543-545 Broad St. 41°26′04″N 96°29′55″W	Fremont	
12	J.D. McDonald House	J.D. McDonald House	December 10, 1980 (#80002444)	310 E. Military Ave. 41°26′10″N 96°29′39″W	Fremont	
13	North Bend Carnegie Library	North Bend Carnegie Library	September 3, 1981 (#81000371)	140 E. 8th St. 41°27′50″N 96°46′44″W	North Bend	
14	North Broad Street Residential Historic District	North Broad Street Residential Historic District	March 17, 2015 (#15000088)	Along Broad St. 41°26′26″N 96°29′53″W	Fremont	
15	Nye House	Nye House	November 23, 1977 (#77000827)	1643 N. Nye Ave. 41°26′42″N 96°30′09″W	Fremont	
16	Old Fremont Post Office	Old Fremont Post Office	February 29, 1996 (#96000223)	605 N. Broad St. 41°26′06″N 96°29′55″W	Fremont	
17	Osterman and Tremaine Building	Osterman and Tremaine Building	May 23, 1978 (#78001695)	455 N. Broad St. 41°26′01″N 96°29′55″W	Fremont	Also known as Ideal Steam Laundry Building
18	St. Charles Borromeo Catholic Church		November 26, 2025 (#100012278)	740 Locust St. 41°27′49″N 96°46′40″W	North Bend	
18	Schneider's Opera House	Schneider's Opera House	September 28, 1988 (#88000939)	104 Ash; 41°42′10″N 96°47′18″W	Snyder	
19	R.B. Schneider House	R.B. Schneider House	July 15, 1982 (#82003186)	234 W. 10th St. 41°26′20″N 96°29′57″W	Fremont	
20	Scribner Town Hall	Scribner Town Hall	August 30, 2010 (#10000608)	West terminus of Howard St. at 3rd St. 41°39′59″N 96°40′01″W	Scribner	
21	George and Nancy Turner House	George and Nancy Turner House	January 11, 1996 (#95001502)	78 S. C St. 41°25′45″N 96°29′37″W	Fremont	
22	Frank Uehling Barn	Frank Uehling Barn	August 1, 1985 (#85001666)	Off U.S. Route 77; 41°44′16″N 96°30′04″W	Uehling	

== See also ==
- List of National Historic Landmarks in Nebraska
- National Register of Historic Places listings in Nebraska
