= McCarty-Lilley House =

- Formerly listed on the U.S. National Register of Historic Places
- Location within Nebraska Location within the United States
- Nearest city: Bellevue, Nebraska
- Coordinates: 41°08′07″N 95°58′20″W
- Area: 0.5 acres (0.20 ha)
- Built: 1865
- Built by: Robert McCarty (1865 house); William H. Huxhold (1918 expansion)
- Architect: William H. Huxhold (1918 expansion)
- Architectural style: mid-western square
- NRHP reference No.: 78001712

Significant dates
- Added to NRHP: December 22, 1978
- Removed from NRHP: March 13, 2020

The McCarty-Lilley House is a historic two-story house in Bellevue, Nebraska. It was built as a one-story house in 1865 by Robert McCarty, a veteran of the Mexican–American War of 1846–1848 who fought in the Battle of Buena Vista and the Battle of Chapultepec. He also served as a Democratic county commissioner for Sarpy Counter in 1857 and 1860. The house was inherited by his granddaughter Susie in 1903, who lived here with her husband James Lilley and their ten children. They added a second story and an attic in 1918. The house was listed on the National Register of Historic Places in 1978, and was delisted in 2020.
