= Third Sarpy County Courthouse =

- U.S. National Register of Historic Places
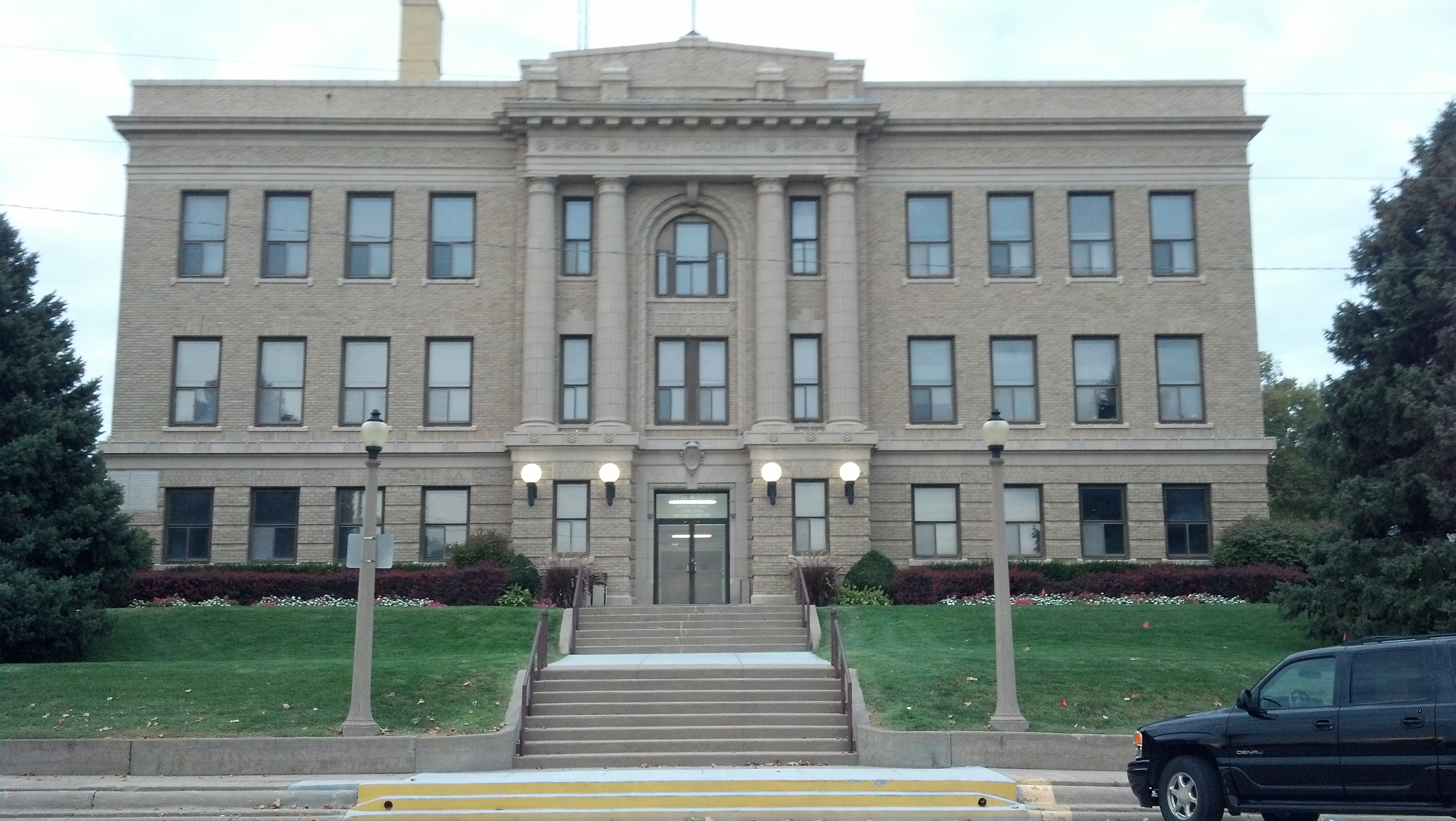
- The building in 2012

- Location within Nebraska Location within the United States
- Location: 3rd Street between Washington and Jefferson Streets, Papillion, Nebraska
- Coordinates: 41.1587707636547°N 96.04243021522188°W
- Area: less than one acre
- Built: 1922
- Built by: John L. Soderberg
- Architect: William F. Gernandt
- Architectural style: Classical Revival
- MPS: County Courthouses of Nebraska MPS
- NRHP reference No.: 90000964
- Added to NRHP: July 5, 1990

The Third Sarpy County Courthouse is a historic building in Papillion, Nebraska, and the former courthouse of Sarpy County. It was built by John L. Soderberg in 1922–1923, and designed in the Classical Revival style by architect William F. Gernandt. Two other courthouses had been built for the county prior to this one: the first one was the Fontenelle Bank in Bellevue, followed by a second one in Papillion. A fourth courthouse replaced this building in 1974, and it became a city hall and public library. It has been listed on the National Register of Historic Places since July 5, 1990.
