= William E. Gordon House =

- U.S. National Register of Historic Places
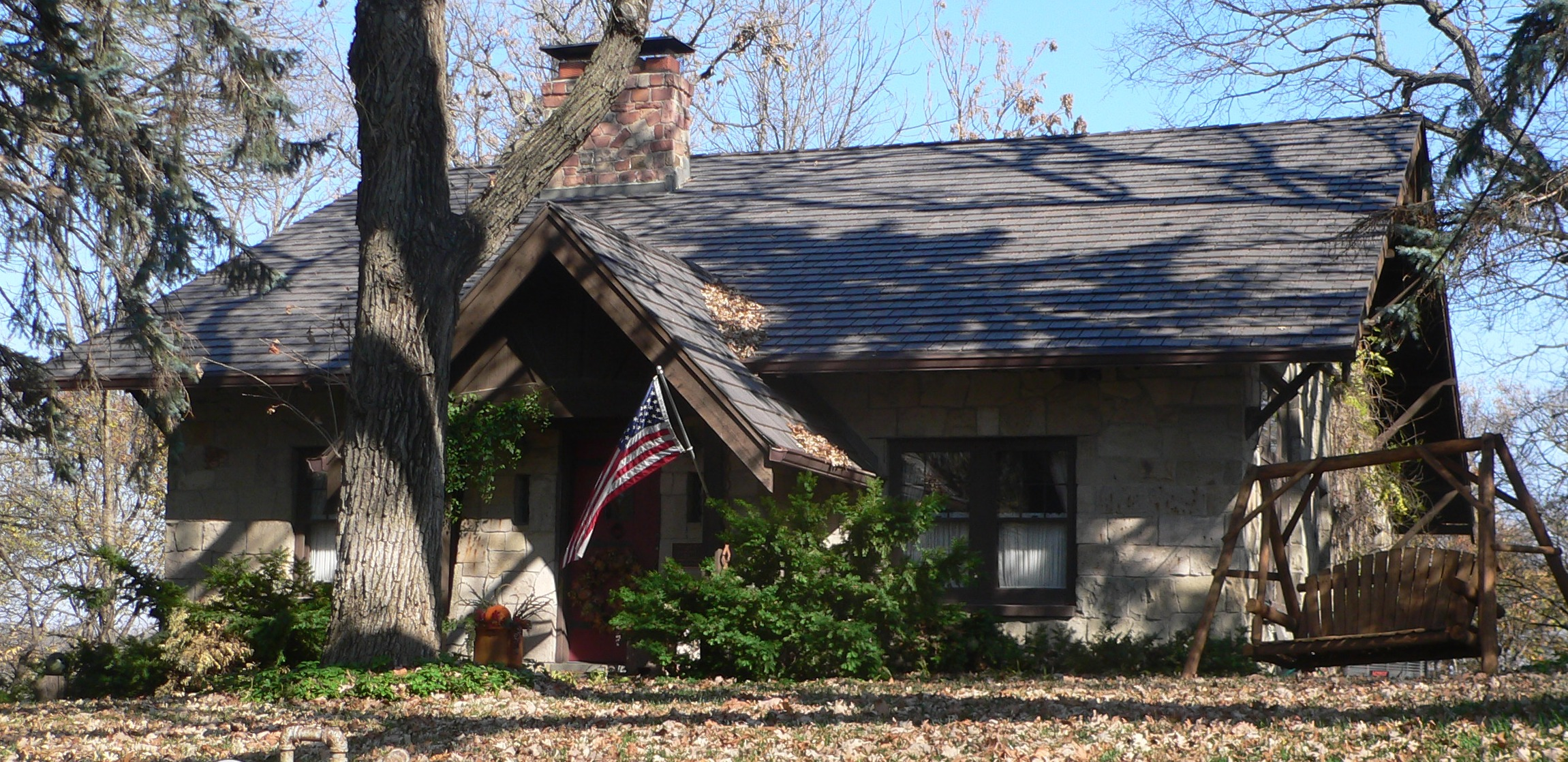
- The house in 2012

- Location within Nebraska Location within the United States
- Location: 711 Bellevue Boulevard South, Bellevue, Nebraska
- Coordinates: 41°09′13″N 95°53′57″W
- Area: less than one acre
- Built: 1936
- Architectural style: American Craftsman
- NRHP reference No.: 06000997
- Added to NRHP: November 8, 2006

The William E. Gordon House is a historic house in Bellevue, Nebraska, United States. It was built in 1936, and designed in the American Craftsman style. According to Stacy Stupka-Burda of the Nebraska State Historical Society, "The house has gable ends with large triangular braced decorative supports positioned under wide eaves. The gable ends feature extra stickwork. The roof is covered with wood shingles and a single large stone chimney pierces the ridgeline. The house is clad with multi-hued gray limestone veneer and the foundation is concrete block." It has been listed on the National Register of Historic Places since November 8, 2006.
