= Lucien Fontenelle =

Fur trader

Lucien Fontenelle (1800–1840) was a prominent fur trader in what is now Nebraska in the early-19th century who was born to François and Marie-Louise Fontenelle on the family plantation south of New Orleans. His parents were killed by a hurricane while he was away attending school in New Orleans. He left New Orleans in 1816 after having been raised for a time by an aunt, and began working in the lower-Missouri fur trade in 1819.

He later became involved in the Missouri Fur Company. He married Bright Sun, also known as Me-um-bane, a daughter of the Omaha Chief Big Elk. Among their children was Logan Fontenelle.

Early in his career Fontenelle was involved in fur trading into the Rocky Mountains. However starting in the late 1820s he was in command at Fontenelle's Post in what would become Bellevue, Nebraska, along the Missouri River. In 1831 he led a trading expedition to the Cache Valley of Utah and Idaho with Andrew Drips. On their return to St. Louis they were joined by some Nez Perces people seeking to get Christian missionaries to come to their people.
