= Fontenelle's Post =

Coordinates: 41.1638°N 95.8891°W

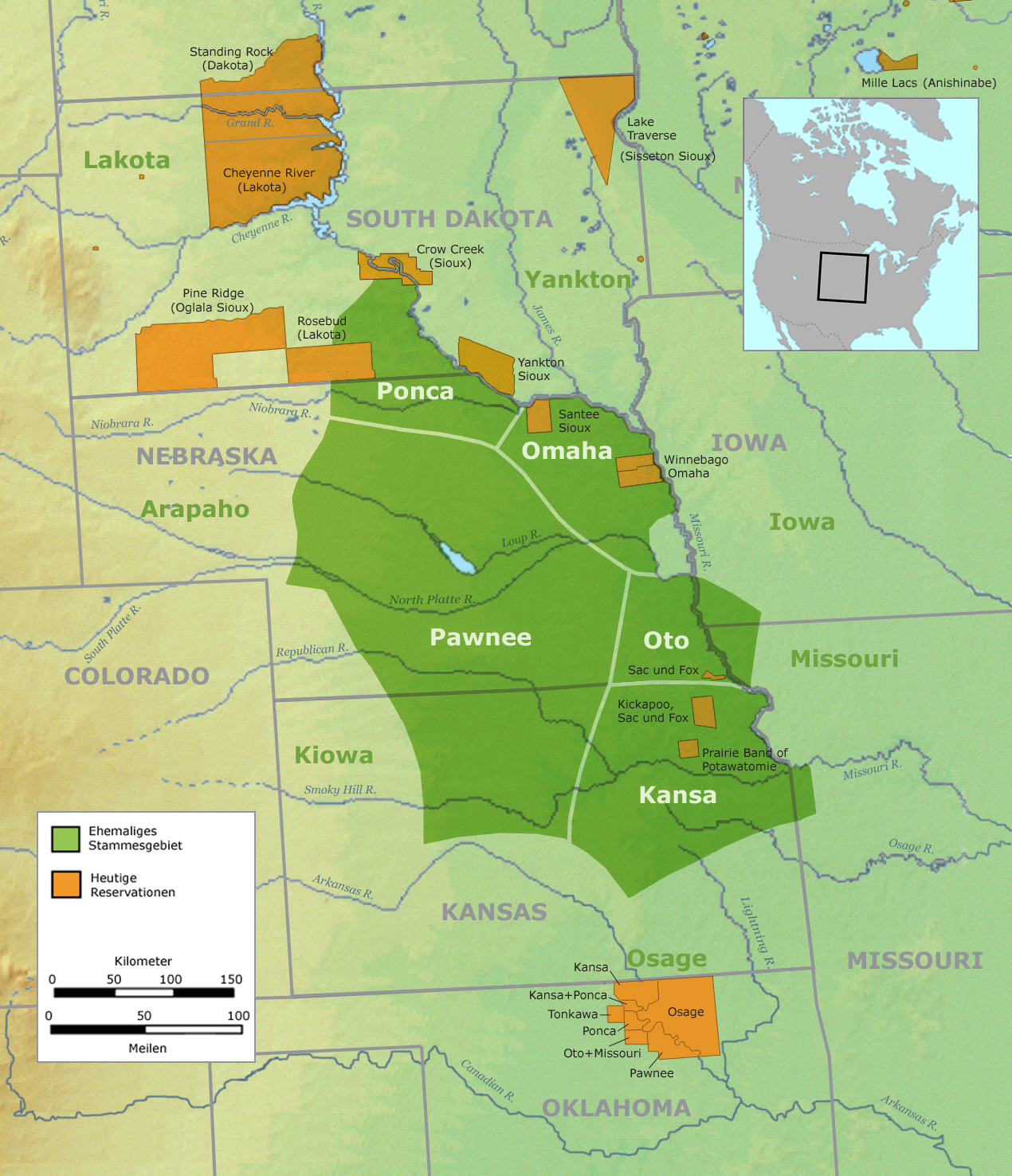
Tribal territory of the Otoe

Fontenelle's Post, first known as Pilcher's Post, and the site of the later city of Bellevue, was built in 1822 in the Nebraska Territory by Joshua Pilcher, then president of the Missouri Fur Company. Located on the west side of the Missouri River, it developed as one of the first European-American settlements in Nebraska. The Post served as a center for trading with local Omaha, Otoe, Missouri, and Pawnee tribes.

In 1828 Lucien Fontenelle, a French-American fur trader representing the American Fur Company, bought the post and became the lead agent. In 1832 he sold the post to the US Government, which used it for the Missouri River Indian Agency (or Bellevue Agency) until about 1842.

The Post also served as the first home of Moses and Eliza Merrill, Baptist missionaries who arrived in 1833. The US Indian agent offered them the trading post building as a temporary home. In 1835 the Merrills founded the first Christian mission in Nebraska Territory to serve the Otoe.

== History ==
In 1822 Joshua Pilcher of the Missouri Fur Company built a fur trading post on the west bank of the Missouri River to trade with the local Native American tribes of Omaha, Otoe, Missouri and Pawnee. Fur trading in the United States was not regulated by governments, and fur traders competed madly for the lucrative business, enticing the American Indians with various trade goods and often liquor. At first Pilcher competed with John Jacob Astor's Cabanné's Post of the American Fur Company (AFC) north of Bellevue. In 1823 Astor bought Pilcher's, bringing it into his monopoly of the fur trade under the American Fur Company.

In 1828 the trader Lucien Fontenelle, born into a wealthy French Creole family in New Orleans, purchased Pilcher's Trading Post. Having started trading at age 19, Fontenelle was then 28 and a representative of the American Fur Company. The site became known as Fontenelle's Post.

Like many traders, Fontenelle had married a high-status Native American woman, and formed important alliances with her people. She was Me-um-bane (Bright Star), a daughter of the Omaha principal chief Big Elk. They had five children together: Logan (b. 1825), Albert (b. 1827), Tecumseh (b. 1829) (named for the great Shawnee chief), Henry (b. 1831) and Susan (b. 1833). Fontenelle sent their sons to St. Louis to ensure they had European-American style schooling. Although the mother's people would protect her children, the Omaha had a patrilineal system in which children belonged to their father's gens. Children of a "white" father had no place in the tribe; generally unless such mixed-race boys were adopted by a man of the tribe, they could not have status in it.

With the fur trade declining because of changes in taste in Europe and the decline of game in the US, in 1832 Fontenelle sold the post to the US government. It was used by the Bureau of Indian Affairs as the headquarters of the Missouri River Indian Agency, also called the Bellevue Agency. The Bureau of Indian Affairs allowed missionaries to come to the Indian reservations. In 1833, the US Indian agent allowed Moses and Eliza Merrill, Baptist missionaries, to live at the Post as a temporary home. In 1835 the Merrills founded the first Christian mission in Nebraska Territory.

Fontenelle was appointed US Indian agent at Fort Laramie and his family joined him there in 1837. He died in 1840 at the age of 40.

From 1840 to 1853, Logan Fontenelle, the oldest son of Lucien and Me-um-bane, worked as an official interpreter at the US Indian agency at Fontenelle's Post. He gained much respect among both the Omaha and European-American communities. He served as an interpreter during the important negotiations of 1853-1854 that resulted in the Omaha ceding most of their territory to the United States, in exchange for annuities and goods, and settling on a reservation in northeastern Nebraska. The town of Bellevue, Nebraska was established in 1855 after developing around the post and Indian agency.

== Iowa trading post ==
At one time, the Bellevue and Council Bluffs area was bristling with trading posts on both sides of the Missouri River, reflecting the busy economy related to western emigration. When the French Creole Peter Sarpy came from New Orleans about 1823, he first worked for his brother's father-in-law, John Cabanné, who had a post for the American Fur Company. Some years later, Sarpy established his own trading post on the east side of the Missouri River, in what became Iowa.

== Marriage and family ==
Like many other fur traders, Sarpy married a local woman, Ni-co-mi of the Iowa tribe. She had a daughter, Mary Gale, born during her first marriage to John Gale, an American surgeon who had been stationed at Fort Atkinson (Nebraska). When it was closed in 1827, he was reassigned. Sarpy and Nicomi also had children.

Ni-co-mi wanted to stay with her people. Her daughter Mary Gale married Joseph LaFlesche, a Métis fur trader adopted as a son by the Omaha chief Big Elk, and groomed and named by him as his successor as the future principal chief.

== Sarpy's Post, Iowa ==
Sarpy's post was located at an area variously called: Point aux Poules (Hens' Point), Point of the Pulls, Pull Point, Sarpy's Point, Nebraska Post Office, Council Bluffs Post Office, and Traders Point. Owned by Astor's American Fur Company, Sarpy's Post served mostly European and United States travelers, and especially outfitted pioneer expeditions going west. The Post was located downriver from present-day Council Bluffs, Iowa.

By 1846 Sarpy expanded his operations to run Sarpy's Ferry, which provided passage for travelers across the Missouri River between Bellevue and St. Mary's. He carried travelers for the Oregon Trail, men going west for the California Gold Rush, and Mormon pioneers. Sarpy County, Nebraska, the area around the town of Bellevue, was named after him.

In 1849 a post office was established on the Iowa side of the river; it was called Nebraska. In 1850 it was called the Council Bluffs Post Office and was located at Sarpy's Point, present-day Iowa. It was reopened on the Nebraska side in 1852 just south of the curve of the river at Sarpy's Point (Iowa) and named Trader's Point Post Office.

== See also ==
- Nebraska Territory
