= William Hamilton House =

- U.S. National Register of Historic Places
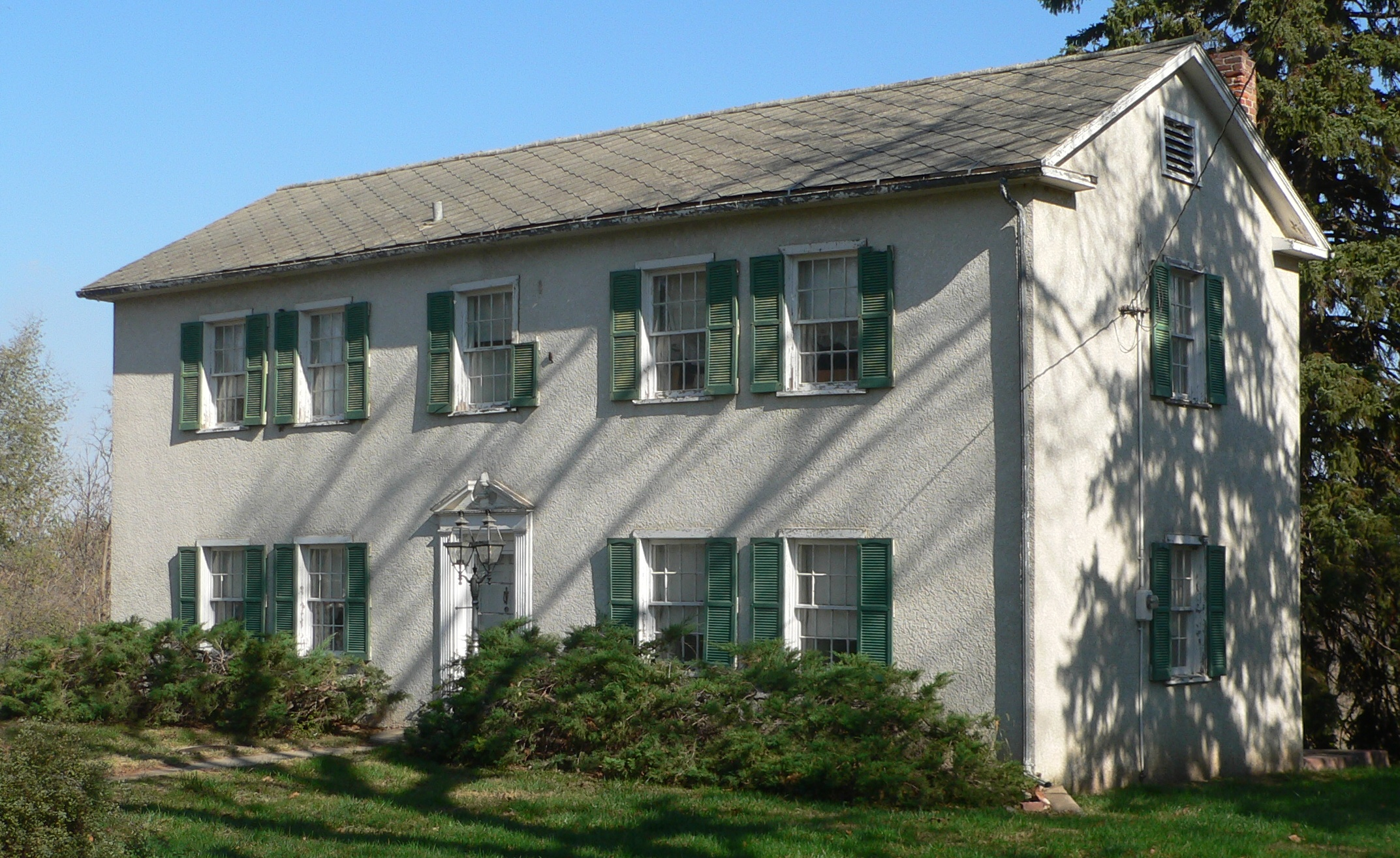
- The house in 2012

- Location within Nebraska Location within the United States
- Location: 2003 Bluff Street, Bellevue, Nebraska
- Coordinates: 41°08′21″N 95°53′16″W
- Area: 1 acre (0.40 ha)
- Built: 1856
- Architectural style: Greek Revival
- NRHP reference No.: 69000137
- Added to NRHP: October 15, 1969

The William Hamilton House is a historic house in Bellevue, Nebraska. It was built in 1856 for Reverend William Hamilton, a Presbyterian minister. It was designed with Greek Revival features like "the low pitch of roof, the design of the windows, and the use of cornice boards and cornice returns." It has been listed on the National Register of Historic Places since October 15, 1969.
