= Christopher Knoell Farmstead =

- Knoell, Christopher, Farmstead
- U.S. National Register of Historic Places
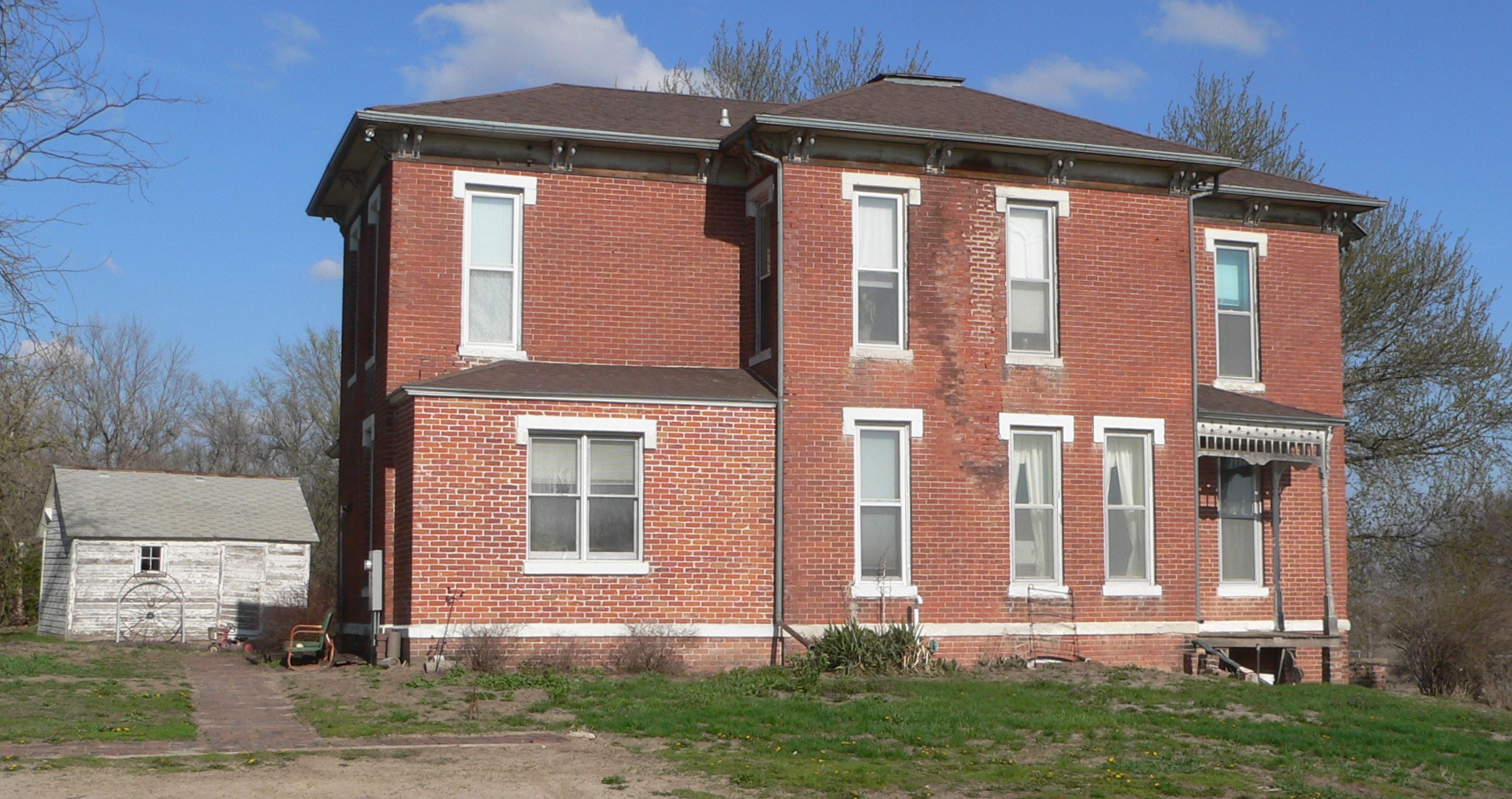
- The house in 2013

- Location within Nebraska Location within the United States
- Nearest city: Fremont, Nebraska
- Coordinates: 41°29′32″N 96°32′53″W
- Area: 162 acres (66 ha)
- Built: 1888
- Architectural style: Italianate
- NRHP reference No.: 83001089
- Added to NRHP: January 13, 1983

The Christopher Knoell Farmstead is a historic farm in Dodge County, Nebraska near Fremont, Nebraska. The farmhouse was built in 1888 for Christopher Knoell, and designed in the Italianate architectural style. The barn was built in 1908–1909. The property still belonged to Knoell's heirs in the 1980s. It has been listed on the National Register of Historic Places since January 13, 1983.
