= Osterman and Tremaine Building =

- U.S. National Register of Historic Places
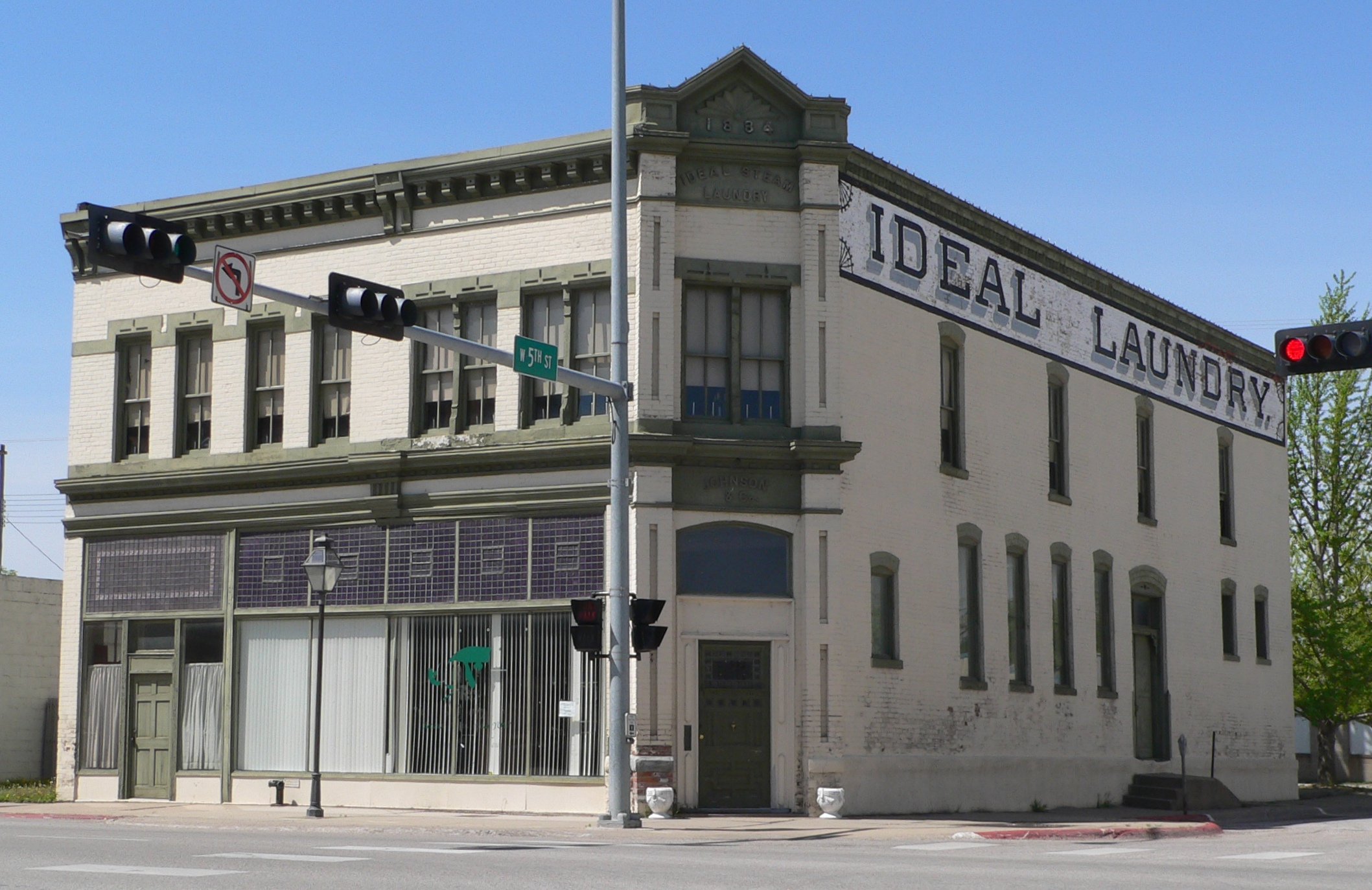
- The building in 2010

- Location within Nebraska Location within the United States
- Location: 455 North Broad Street, Fremont, Nebraska
- Coordinates: 41°26′01″N 96°29′55″W
- Area: less than one acre
- Built: 1884
- Built by: P. Nehrbas
- Architect: Charles F. Driscoll
- NRHP reference No.: 78001695
- Added to NRHP: May 23, 1978

The Osterman and Tremaine Building is a historic building in Fremont, Nebraska. It was built as a two-story commercial structure in 1884 for Osterman and Tremaine, a wholesale firm of produce co-founded by Charles Osterman, a German immigrant, and George S. Tremaine. It was designed by architect Charles F. Driscoll, with a metal cornice. It was acquired by Ideal Steam Laundry, Johnson & Co. in 1894, and it closed down in 1963. By the mid-1970s, it housed law offices. It has been listed on the National Register of Historic Places since May 23, 1978.
