= Log Cabin (Bellevue, Nebraska) =

Historic house in Nebraska, United States

- Old Log Cabin
- U.S. National Register of Historic Places
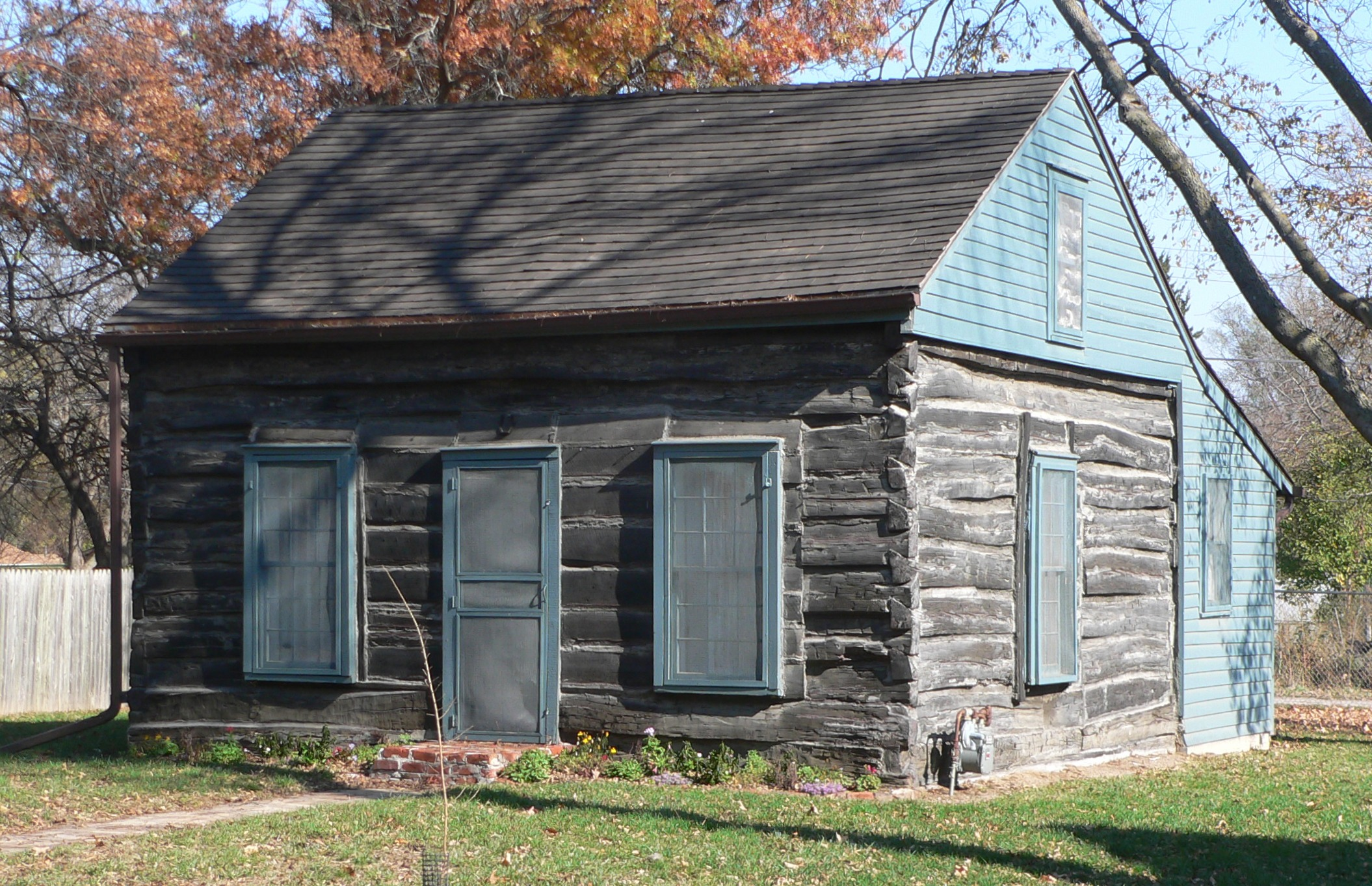
- Bellevue log cabin, seen from the southwest

- Location within Nebraska Location within the United States
- Location: 1805 Hancock St, Bellevue, Nebraska
- Coordinates: 41°8′28.43″N 95°53′30.7″W
- Area: 0.3 acres (0.12 ha)
- Built: 1835
- NRHP reference No.: 70000376
- Added to NRHP: October 16, 1970

The Log Cabin at present-day 1805 Hancock Street in Bellevue, Nebraska was built in the 1830s, and is commonly acknowledged as the oldest building in Nebraska.

== History ==
A trapper built the log cabin around 1835 in the Missouri River floodplains, and around 1850 it was moved to its present-day location. It was used as a residence until 1954, occupied by just three families from 1856 to 1950.

The building was one and a half stories tall with a bedroom in the loft. Hand-hewn cottonwood logs surrounded a dirt floor and fireplace. In 1906 a kitchen and pantry were added to the east side; in 1972, a basement was dug and the main floor was restored. Today, the Sarpy County Historical Society maintains the building in near-original condition as a memorial to the living conditions of the pioneers.

The property was listed on the National Register of Historic Places on October 16, 1970.

== See also ==
- List of the oldest buildings in Nebraska
