= Fontenelle Bank =

- Fontanelle Bank
- U.S. National Register of Historic Places
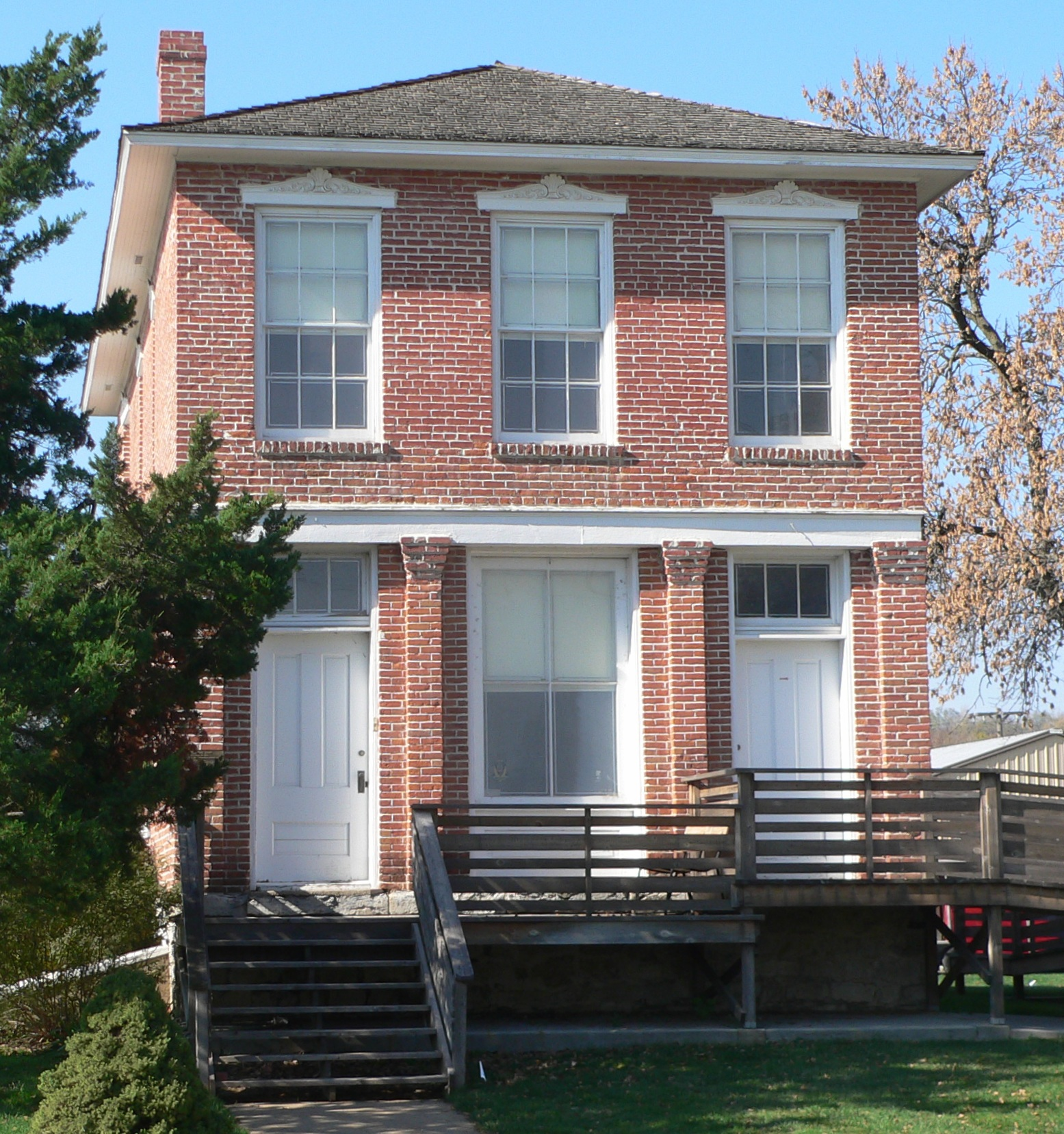
- The building in 2012

- Location within Nebraska Location within the United States
- Location: 2212 Main Street, Bellevue, Nebraska
- Coordinates: 41.136670779930114°N 95.89122436105103°W
- Area: 0.3 acres (0.12 ha)
- Built: 1856
- Architectural style: Greek Revival, Italianate
- NRHP reference No.: 69000136
- Added to NRHP: April 16, 1969

The Fontenelle Bank is a historic building in Bellevue, Nebraska. It was built with bricks in 1856, and the facade was designed in the Greek Revival style, with pilasters, and the Italianate style, with "the elaborate window caps and the elongation of the wall openings." It housed the Fontenelle Bank in 1856–1857, and it was the first Sarpy County Courthouse from 1861 to 1875, followed by Bellevue's town hall until 1959. It has been listed on the National Register of Historic Places since April 16, 1969.

== See also ==
- Third Sarpy County Courthouse, also NRHP-listed
- List of the oldest buildings in Nebraska
