= Nye House =

- U.S. National Register of Historic Places
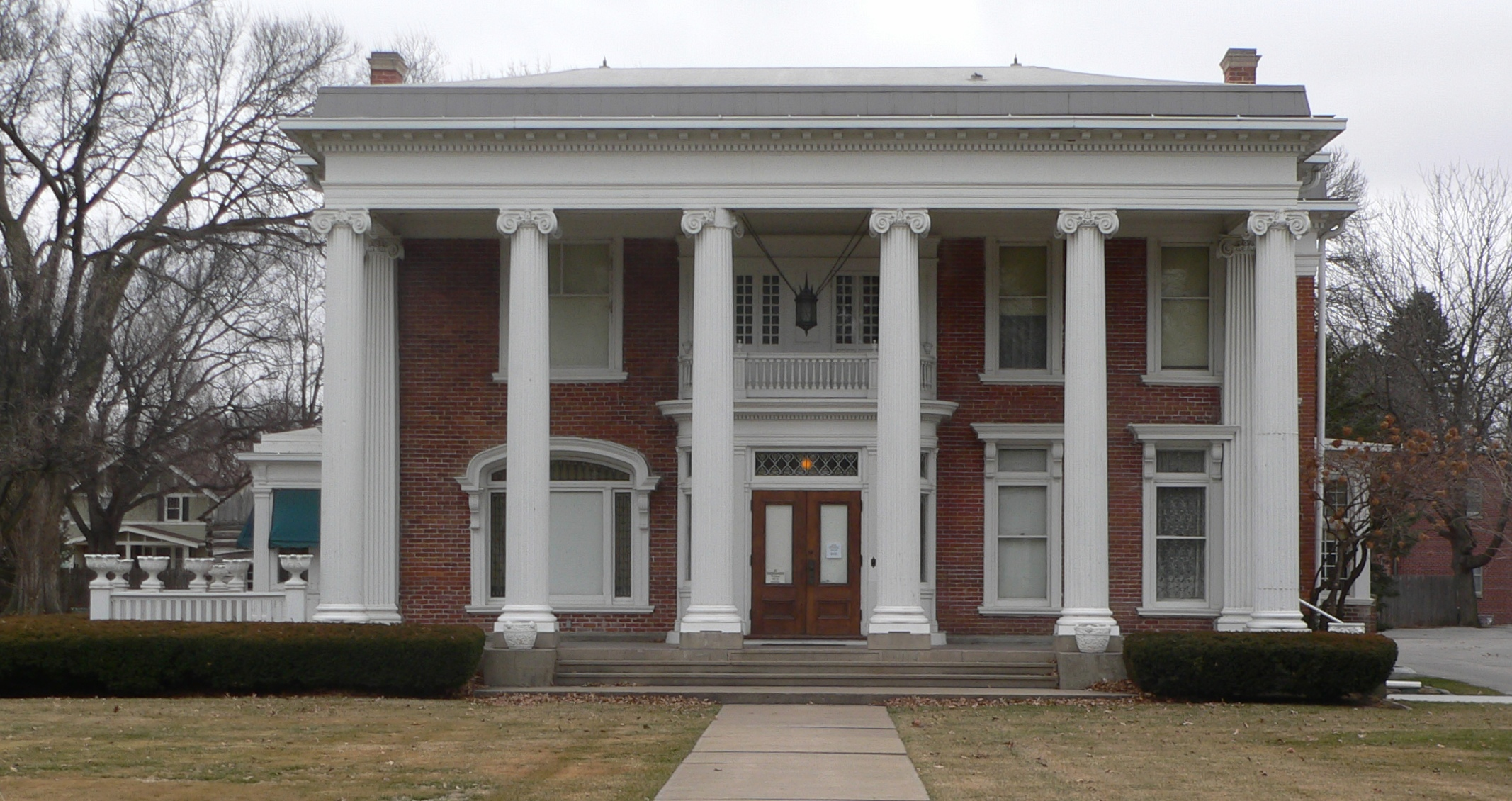
- The building in 2012

- Location within Nebraska Location within the United States
- Location: 1643 North Nye Avenue, Fremont, Nebraska
- Coordinates: 41°26′42″N 96°30′09″W
- Area: 2 acres (0.81 ha)
- Built: 1874; 1901-12 (remodel)
- Architect: Ferry & Clas (remodel)
- Architectural style: Italianate, Georgian Revival
- NRHP reference No.: 77000827
- Added to NRHP: November 23, 1977

The Nye House, also known as the Louis E. May Museum, is a historic building in Fremont, Nebraska. It was built in 1874 for Theron Nye, who lived here with his wife, née Caroline Colson, and their four children.

== History ==
Nye was a farmer and the founding president of the First National Bank of Fremont. He designed the house in the Italianate style. His son, Ray Nye, served as the first mayor of Fremont. He hired Ferry & Clas to redesign the house in the Georgian Revival architectural style; the remodel was accomplished during 1901-12. From 1921 to 1968, it housed a Lutheran seminary known as the Western Theological Seminary. It was later turned into the Louis E. May Museum. It has been listed on the National Register of Historic Places since November 23, 1977.
