= J.D. McDonald House =

- J. D. McDonald House
- U.S. National Register of Historic Places
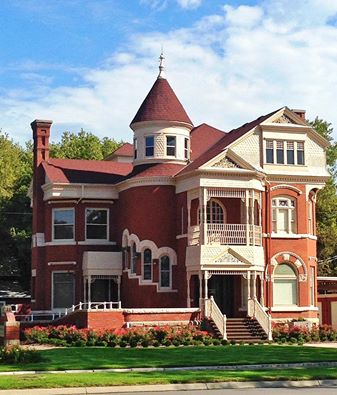
- J.D McDonald House in 2014

- Location within Nebraska Location within the United States
- Location: 310 East Military Avenue, Fremont, Nebraska
- Coordinates: 41°26′09″N 96°29′39″W
- Area: less than one acre
- Built: 1888
- Architect: M.A. Ecker
- Architectural style: Queen Anne, Victorian Romanesque
- NRHP reference No.: 80002444
- Added to NRHP: December 10, 1980

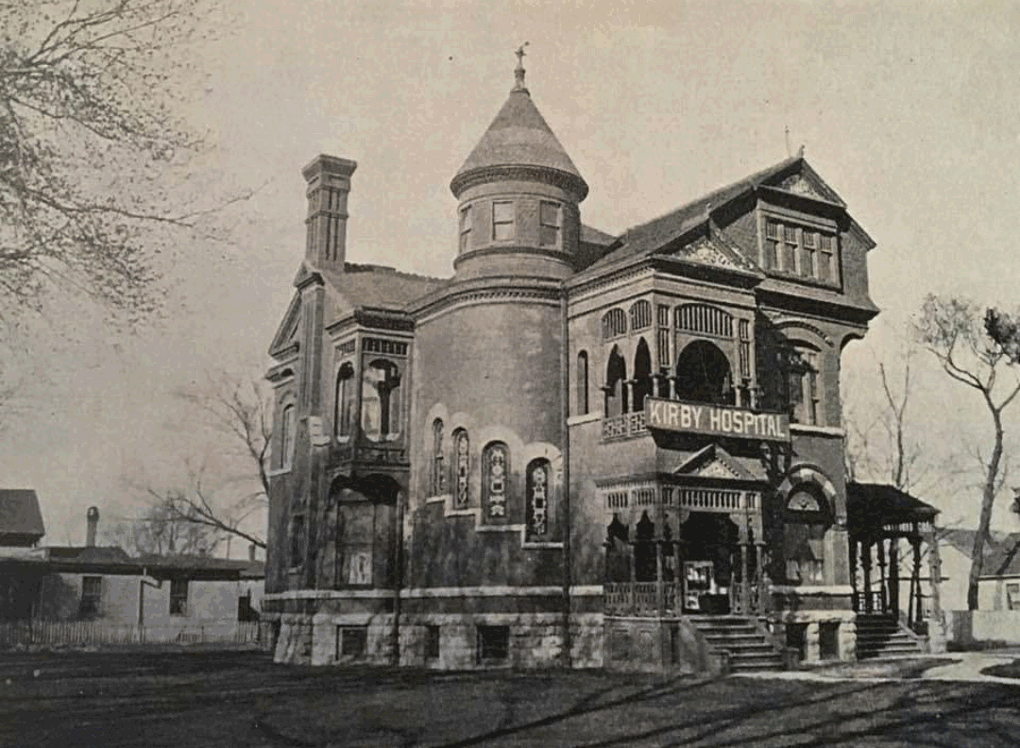
The J.D. McDonald house as the Kirby Hospital circa 1905

The J.D. McDonald House is a historic house in Fremont, Nebraska. It was built in 1888 for Joseph D. McDonald (1846-1896), a Canadian-born railroad contractor who founded the Fremont Manufacturing Company and served on the board of directors of the Fremont National Bank. He hired F.M. Ellis as the architect and M.A. Ecker as the general contractor to build it in the Queen Anne and Romanesque Revival architectural styles. It has been listed on the National Register of Historic Places since December 10, 1980. The McDonald family resided in the house until 1898. The building became the first hospital in Fremont, Nebraska in 1905 under the name Kirby Hospital.
