= Old Fremont Post Office =

- U.S. National Register of Historic Places
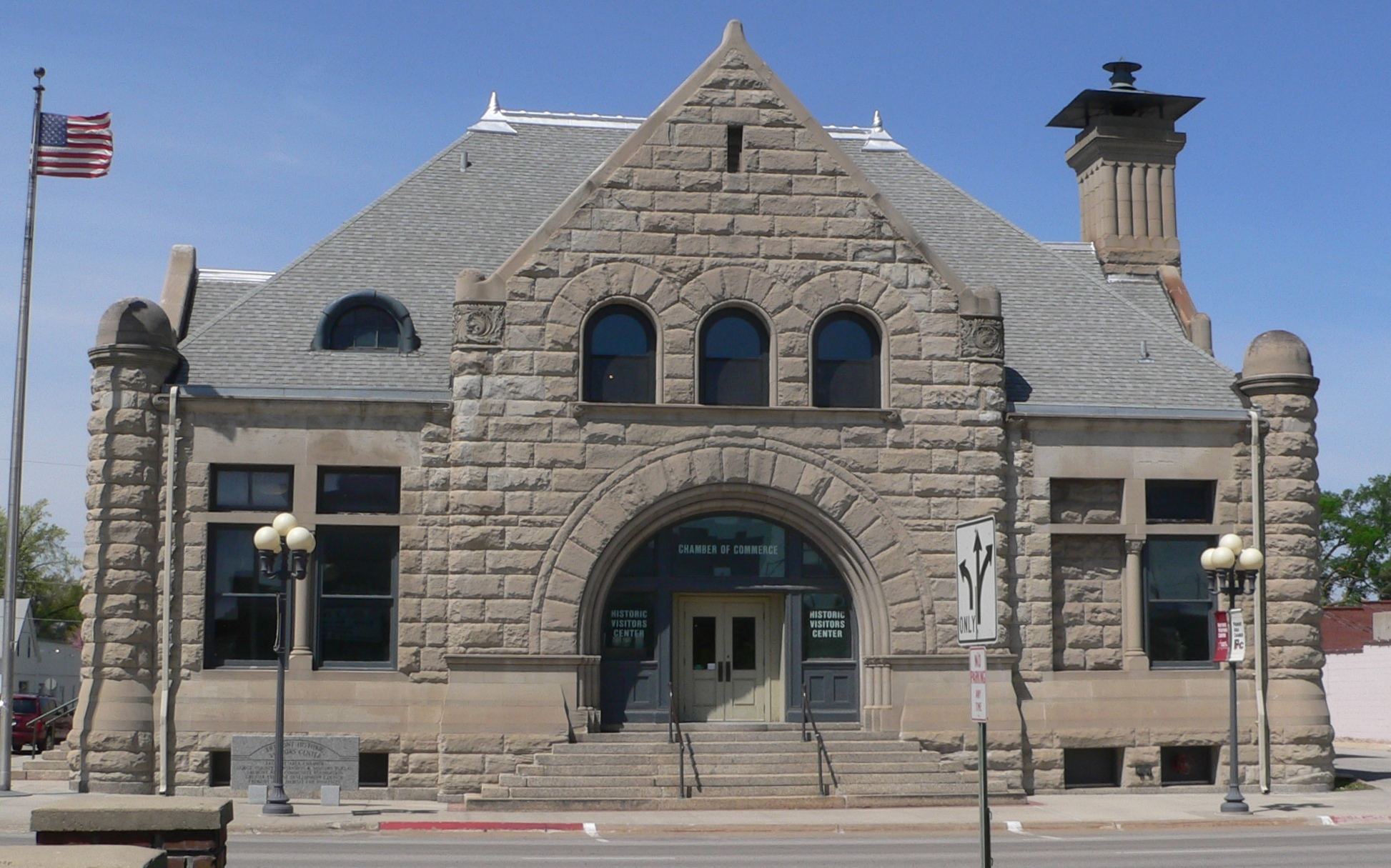
- The building in 2010

- Location within Nebraska Location within the United States
- Location: 605 North Broad Street, Fremont, Nebraska
- Coordinates: 41°26′06″N 96°29′55″W
- Area: less than one acre
- Built: 1893
- Architect: W.J. Edbrooke
- Architectural style: Richardsonian Romanesque
- NRHP reference No.: 96000223
- Added to NRHP: February 29, 1996

The Old Fremont Post Office is a historic building in Fremont, Nebraska. It was built in 1893–1895, and designed in the Richardsonian Romanesque architectural style by W.J. Edbrooke William T. White was hired as the builder, and Charles W. Guindele as the interior designer. On October 3, 1893, former Republican Congressman George Washington Emery Dorsey dedicated the building, even though it was still under construction. It has been listed on the National Register of Historic Places since February 29, 1996.
