= Stolley Homestead Site =

- Stolley, William, Homestead and Site of Fort Independence
- U.S. National Register of Historic Places
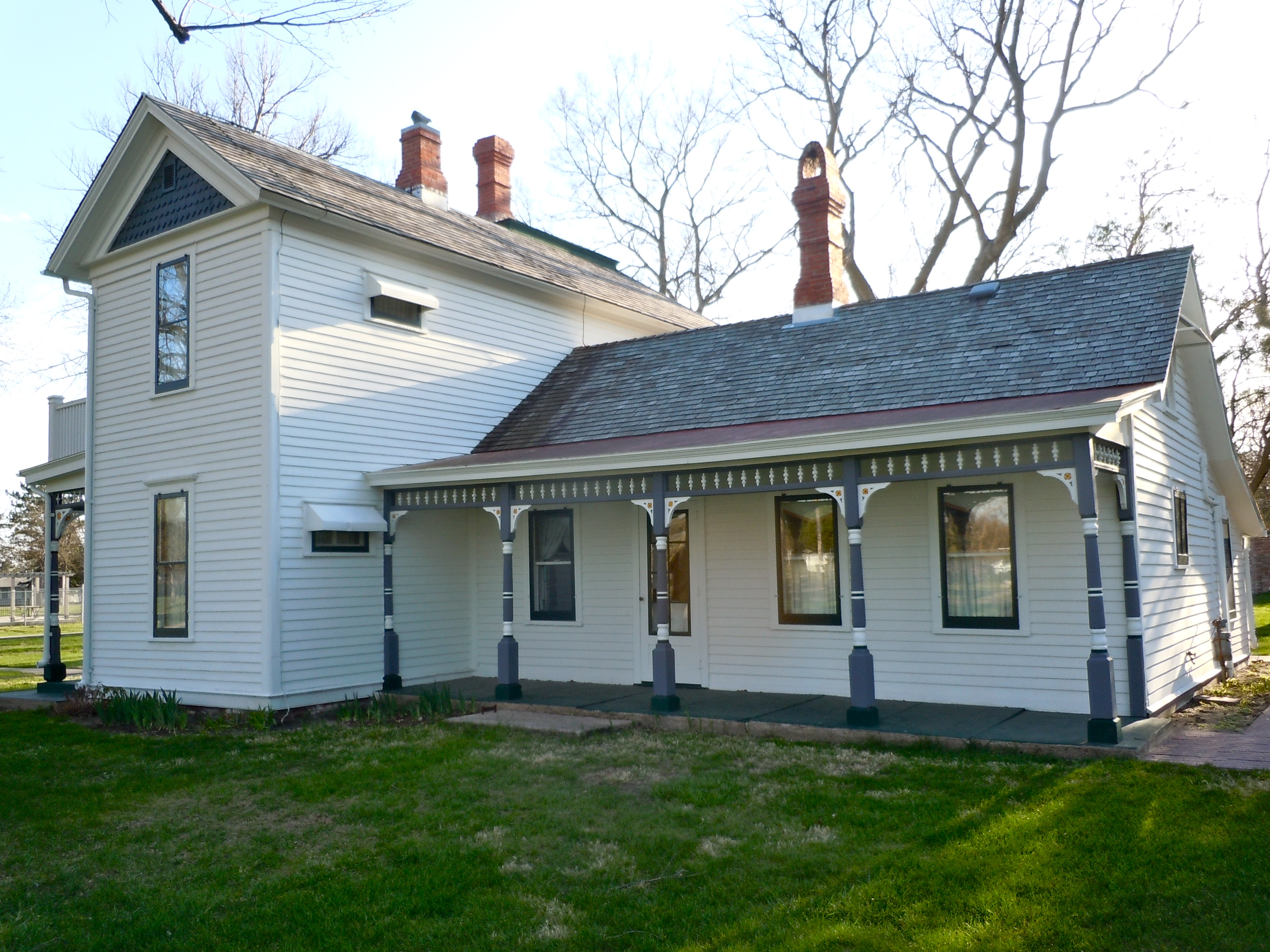
- The house in 2011

- Location within Nebraska Location within the United States
- Location: 2103 Stolley Park Road West, Stolley Park, Grand Island, Nebraska
- Coordinates: 40°54′02″N 98°21′33″W
- Area: 6 acres (2.4 ha)
- Built: 1857
- NRHP reference No.: 72001584
- Added to NRHP: March 16, 1972

The Stolley Homestead Site is a historic house in Grand Island, Nebraska. It was built in 1858-1859 as a log cabin by William Stolley, an immigrant from Schleswig-Holstein, Germany. The property was acquired by the state of Nebraska in 1927. It has been listed on the National Register of Historic Places since March 16, 1972.
