= Schneider's Opera House =

- Scheider's Opera House
- U.S. National Register of Historic Places
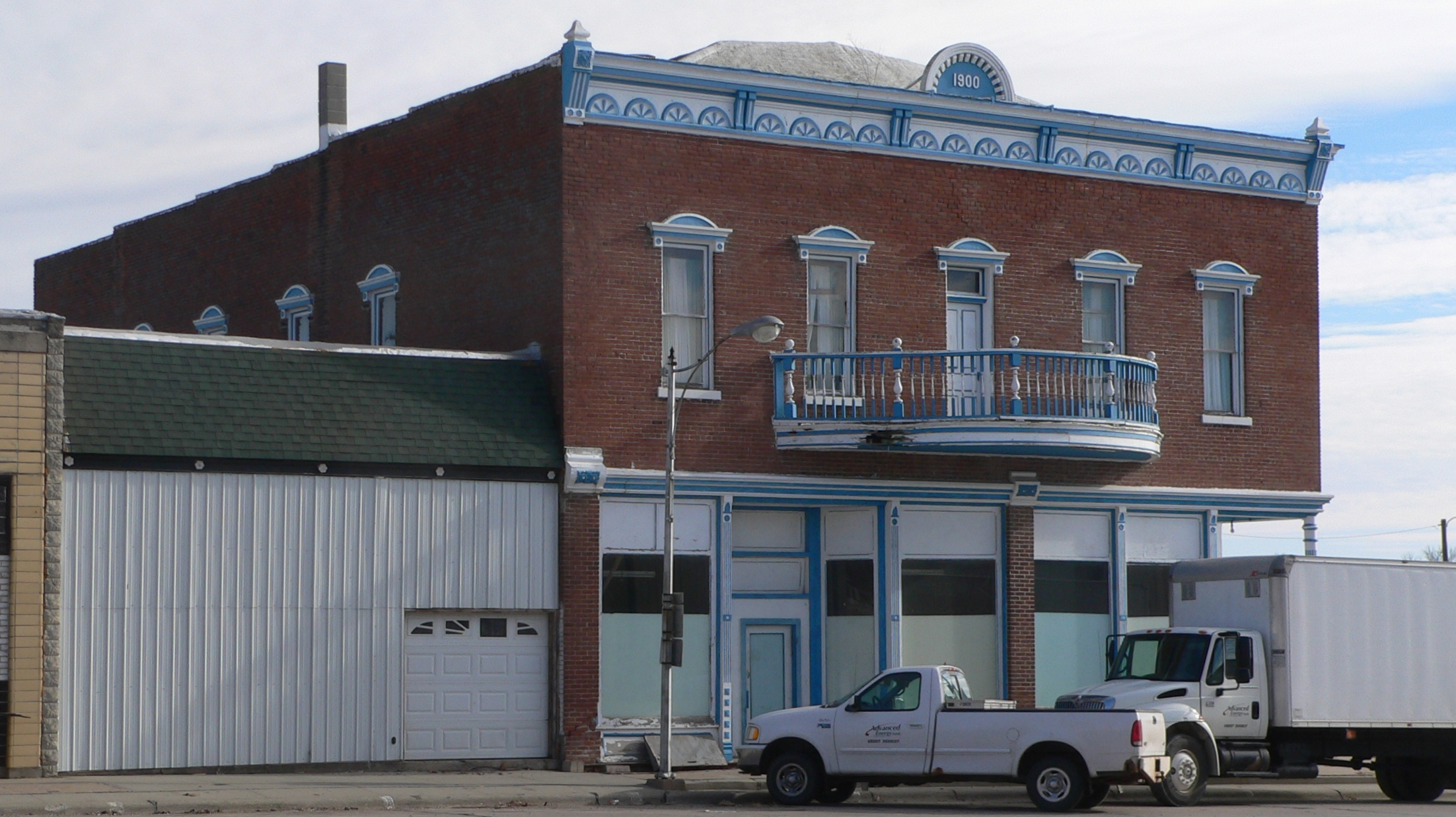
- The building in 2011

- Location within Nebraska Location within the United States
- Location: 104 Ash, Snyder, Nebraska
- Coordinates: 41°42′10″N 96°47′16″W
- Area: less than one acre
- Built: 1900
- Architectural style: Two-part commercial block
- MPS: Opera House Buildings in Nebraska 1867-1917 MPS
- NRHP reference No.: 88000939
- Added to NRHP: September 28, 1988

The Schneider Opera House is a historic building in Snyder, Nebraska. It was built as a two-part commercial block building in 1900 on land formerly owned by Conrad Schneider, Snyder's founder. According to the National Register of Historic Places form, "This opera house is significant in the area of social history because it gave Snyder a neutral, nonaffiliated location for political meetings, church bazaars, community parties, high school graduation, and box socials. [...] In the days before radio, television, and sound movies, activities at the opera house were anticipated for days or weeks' ahead of time." The building has been listed on the National Register of Historic Places since September 28, 1988.
