= St. Benedict's Catholic Church (Nebraska City, Nebraska) =

Historic church in Nebraska, United States

- U.S. National Register of Historic Places
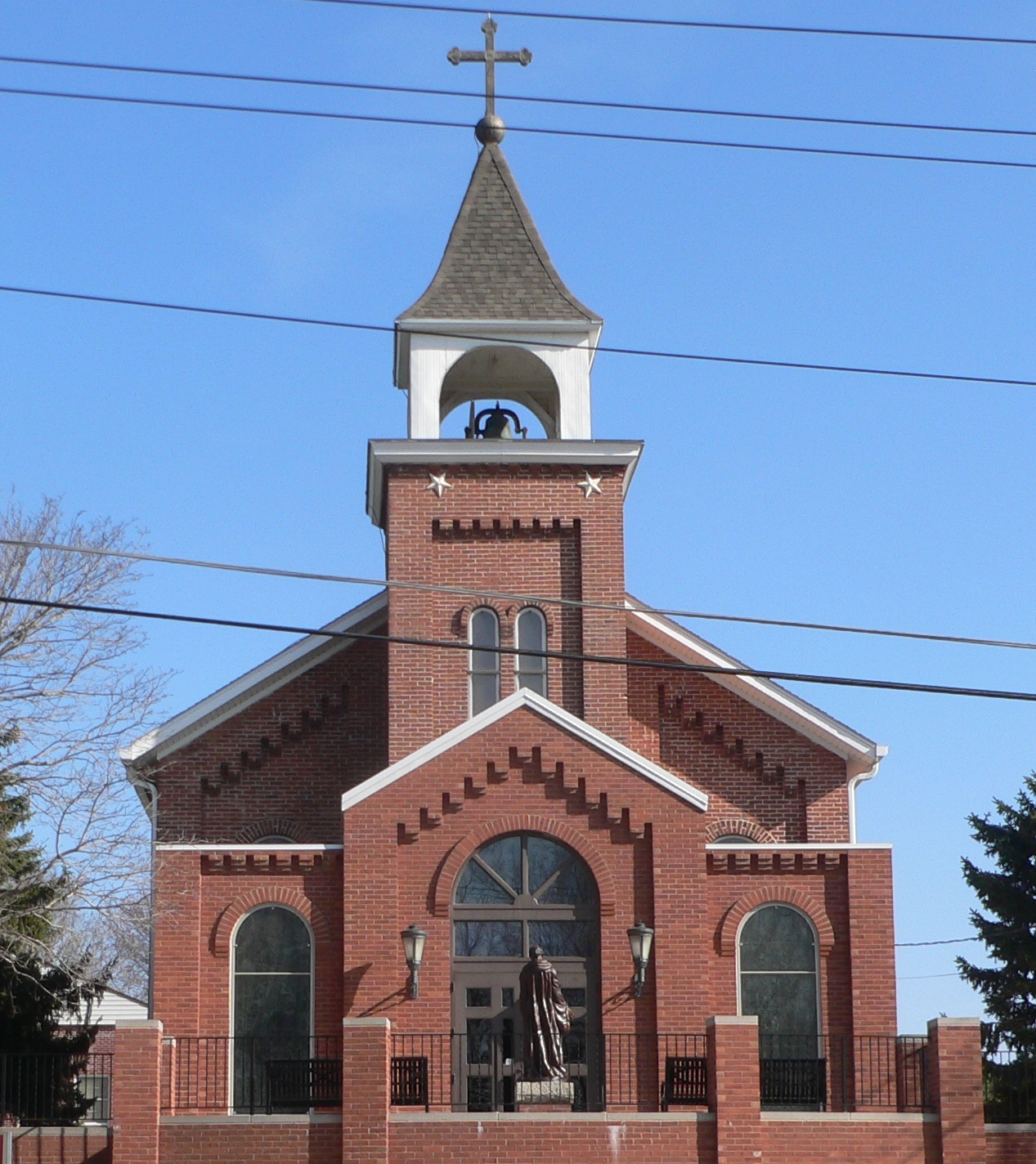
- St. Benedict's, seen from the northwest.

- Location within Nebraska Location within the United States
- Location: 411 5th Rue, Nebraska City, Nebraska
- Coordinates: 40°40′11″N 95°50′28″W
- Area: less than one acre
- Built: 1861
- Architect: Gerhardt, August; Darley, James
- NRHP reference No.: 83001100
- Added to NRHP: January 27, 1983

St. Benedict's Catholic Church is a Catholic church in Nebraska City, Nebraska, United States. It is on the National Register of Historic Places. The church parish was founded in 1856 and its building, completed in 1861, is the oldest brick church in the state of Nebraska. The church's address is 411 5th Rue, Nebraska City, Nebraska.

It is a brick "vernacular Romanesque structure featuring buttresses and entry tower".

Its exterior walls were noticed to be spreading in 1948, and it was feared the roof would collapse. "The walls were dismantled, reinforced and then rebuilt using primarily original brick."
