= John Sautter Farmhouse =

- Sautter, John, Farmhouse
- U.S. National Register of Historic Places
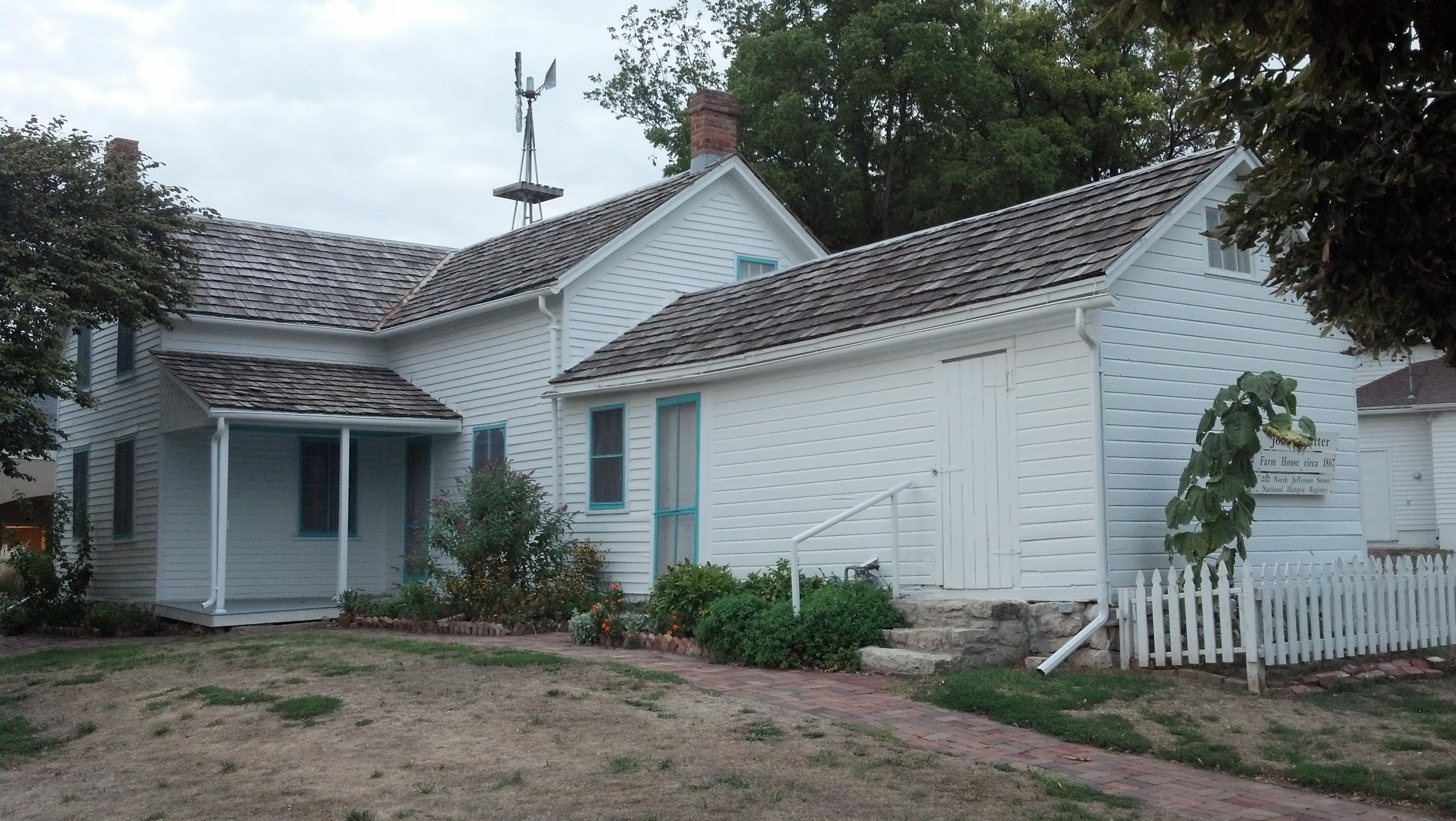
- The farm house in 2012

- Location within Nebraska Location within the United States
- Location: 220 North Jefferson Street, Papillion, Nebraska
- Coordinates: 41.15786472063937°N 96.04205817429055°W
- Area: less than one acre
- Built: 1866
- Built by: John Sautter Sr.
- NRHP reference No.: 80002463
- Added to NRHP: September 30, 1980

The John Sautter Farmhouse is a historic one-and-a-half-story farm house in Papillion, Nebraska. It was built in 1866 for John Sautter Sr., his wife Anna Elisabeth Lehner, and their three sons. The Sautters were immigrants from Ostdorf, Balingen, Württemberg, Germany. After John Sr. died in 1905 and his wife died in 1914, their son John Jr. lived on the farm until 1943. The house was acquired by the Papillion Area Historical Society in 1979 and relocated from North Papillion to its current location. It has been listed on the National Register of Historic Places since September 30, 1980.
