= Moses Merrill Mission =

Coordinates: 41°04′22″N 95°59′49″W

- Moses Merrill Mission and Oto Village
- U.S. National Register of Historic Places
- Location: Bellevue, Nebraska
- Built: 1835
- NRHP reference No.: 72000757
- Added to NRHP: March 16, 1972

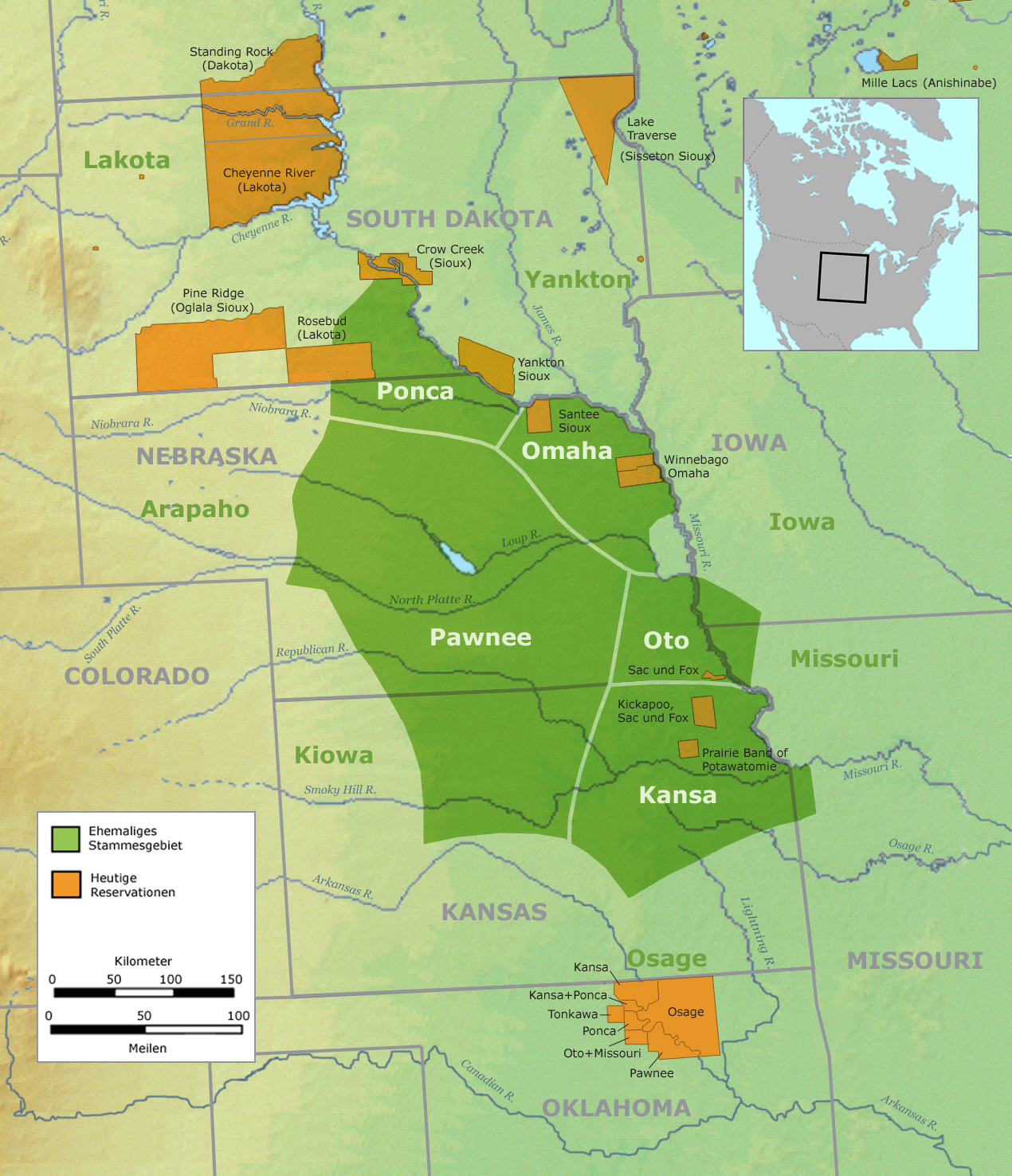
Tribal territory of the Otoe

The Moses Merrill Mission, also known as the Oto Mission, was located about eight miles west of Bellevue, Nebraska. It was built and occupied by Moses and Eliza Wilcox Merrill, the first missionaries resident in Nebraska. The first building was part of facilities built in 1835 when the United States Government removed the Otoe about eight miles southwest of Bellevue. Merrill's goal was to convert the local Otoe tribe to Christianity; he had learned the language and translated the Bible and some hymns into Otoe.

The first log cabin had to be replaced after it burned, but by 1835 they had built a combined school/church building. After Merrill died in 1840 from tuberculosis, the Otoe left the mission and moved their village. His wife Eliza Merrill returned to the East with their son. Settlers used the cabin into the 1860s.

As of 2005, the only remainders of the second and larger mission building are its original chimney and the cottonwood trees planted by Eliza Merrill. As of July 2016, the last remaining cottonwood tree was torn down. The site was added to the National Register of Historic Places in 1972. The state has placed a highway historical marker near the former site of the Oto Mission.

== History ==
The Reverend Moses Merrill was from Sedgwick, Maine, where his father Daniel was a minister. He went to the Michigan Territory and through friends met Eliza Wilcox from Albany, New York. They married and, after receiving training as missionaries for the Baptist Church, they arrived in Bellevue, Nebraska in 1833. The Indian agent offered them space in the former trading post called Fontenelle's, then part of buildings used by the Bellevue Indian Agency. Merrill immediately took up studying the Otoe language and later translated parts of the Bible and some hymns into Otoe.

When the US Government removed the Otoe to a location southwest of Bellevue near the mouth of the Platte River, the Merrills followed to remain with them. They first used a log cabin provided by the government. In 1835 they quickly established a school and church for the Otoe tribe, whose nearest village and cemetery lay a quarter of a mile directly southeast.

A year after the move, the Merrills' first mission cabin burned down. They built a larger house to replace it, where they also ran a school. Soon after, Merrill encouraged the Otoe to move from their long-occupied village near Yutan to his mission. The Merrills established a school for Otoe children and held church services there.

Merrill made a lasting contribution by translating the Bible and other works into Otoe. The missionary work was arduous, as the couple tried to protect the Otoe from mercenary traders and unsympathetic settlers, as well as competing Indian factions. Merrill traveled frequently, as the Otoe territory extended to the Elkhorn River. In 1839 he contracted tuberculosis, from which he died in 1840. The Otoe left the mission and moved to a new village.

Eliza Merrill left Nebraska soon after the death of her husband to return with their son to Albany, New York, where she established an orphanage. Settlers used the old mission for church services past the 1860s.

== Structure ==
The first mission building was a simple shack made of local woods. The second mission building was built after the first one burned down in 1836 or 1837. The new facility included a schoolroom for Otoe children and living quarters, including two bedrooms on the second story. A porch ran across the front of the building between the two end rooms and faced south. It is believed that Eliza Merrill planted at least three of the giant cottonwood trees standing on the site today, which range from 25 to 30 feet in circumference.

The structure was made from poplar logs, squared and closely notched at the corners. Lime plaster was poured between the log walls and the thin sheathing of planed boards on the interior. A large chimney built of native limestone was "plastered with lime almost as hard as the stone itself," and was located in the center of the building. It was 25 feet tall with a five-foot square base. Today only the chimney and cottonwood trees remain on the site.

== Legacy and honors ==
- The Merrill Mission site is listed on the National Register of Historic Places.
- Both the Merrills kept diaries through this period: his cover the period of Nov. 29, 1832 - Sept. 14, 1839, and hers cover May 20, 1832 - July 13, 1841. These are held with their correspondence and other papers by the Nebraska State Historical Society.

== See also ==
- History of Nebraska
- Sarpy County Historical Museum
