= George and Nancy Turner House =

- U.S. National Register of Historic Places
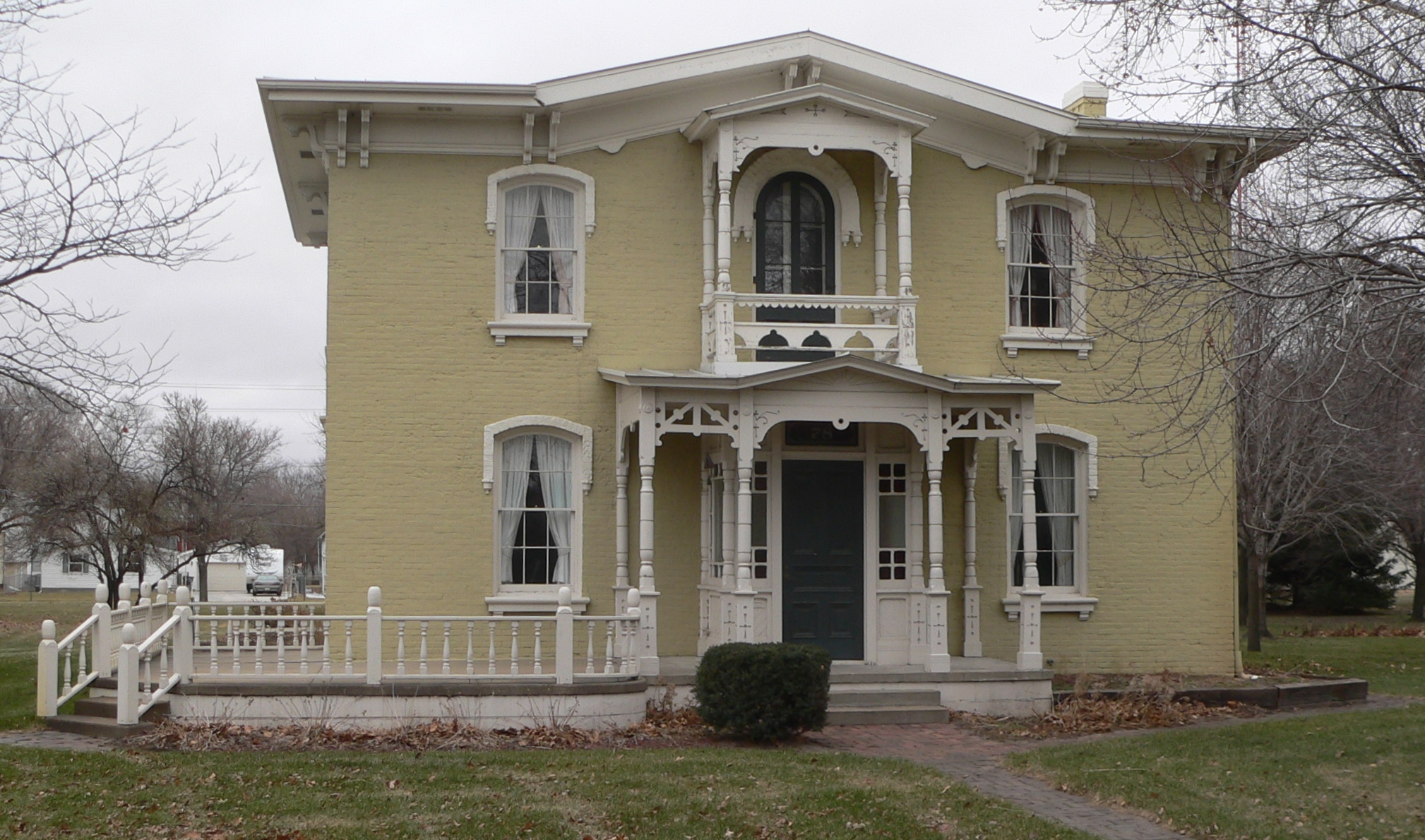
- The house in 2012

- Location within Nebraska Location within the United States
- Location: 78 South C Street, Fremont, Nebraska
- Coordinates: 41°25′45″N 96°29′35″W
- Area: less than one acre
- Built: 1868
- Built by: George Turner
- Architectural style: Italianate
- NRHP reference No.: 95001502
- Added to NRHP: January 11, 1996

The George and Nancy Turner House is a historic house in Fremont, Nebraska. The two-story brick house was built in 1860 for homesteader George Turner and his wife Nancy. It was designed in the Italianate architectural style. George Turner died in 1870, and his widow expanded the rear of the house in 1874. The entrance was redesigned in the Queen Anne style in 1889–1891. The house remained in the Turner family until 1980. It has been listed on the National Register of Historic Places since January 11, 1996.
