= Samuel Bullock House =

- U.S. National Register of Historic Places
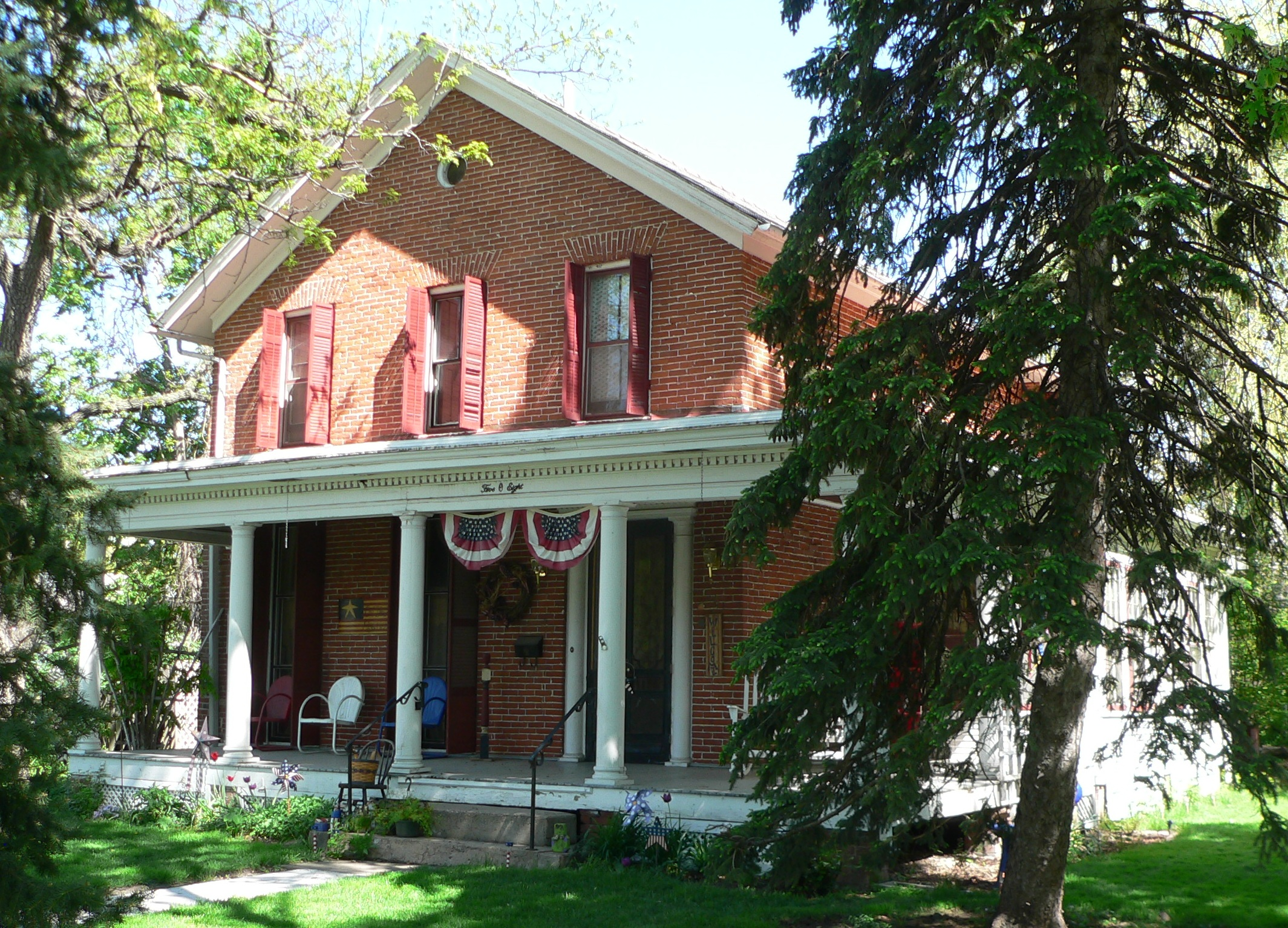
- The house in 2010

- Location within Nebraska Location within the United States
- Location: 508 West Military Avenue, Fremont, Nebraska
- Coordinates: 41°26′10″N 96°30′08″W
- Area: less than one acre
- Built: 1869
- Architectural style: Greek Revival, Vernacular Greek Revival
- NRHP reference No.: 85002147
- Added to NRHP: September 12, 1985

The Samuel Bullock House, or the Dr Joshua DeVries House, is a historic cottage in Fremont, Nebraska. It was built in 1869, and designed in the Greek Revival architectural style. It was purchased by Arthur Truesdell in 1881; Truesdell was a businessman who served on the boards of directors of the Fremont Foundry and Machine Company and the Fremont National Bank. The cottage was acquired by Dr. Joshua DeVries, a physician and surgeon, in 1893. It has been listed on the National Register of Historic Places since September 12, 1985.
