= Fremont Historic Commercial District =

Historic district in Nebraska, United States

- U.S. National Register of Historic Places
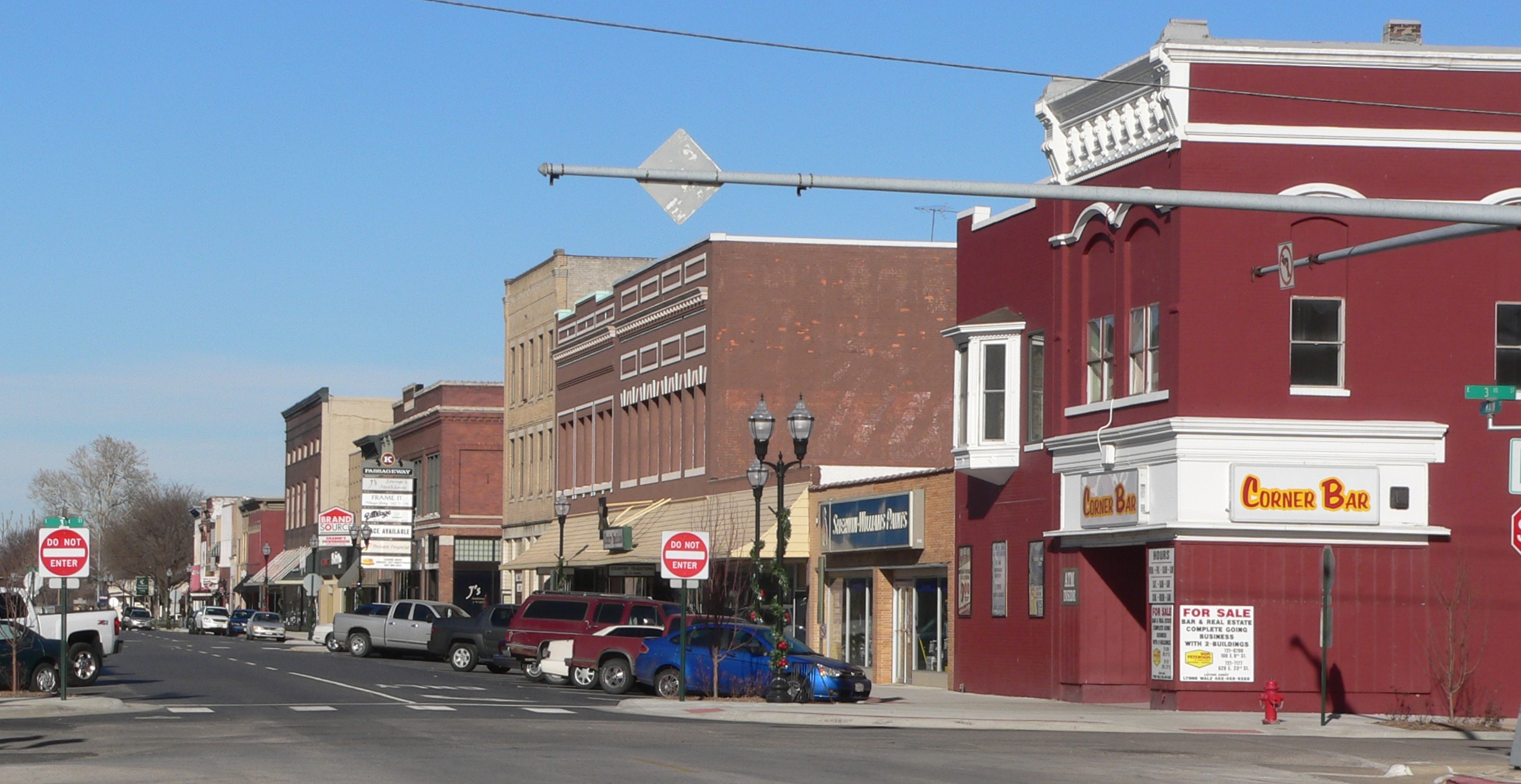

- Location within Nebraska Location within the United States
- Location: Roughly bounded by 3rd, Military, Park and D Sts., Fremont, Nebraska
- Coordinates: 41°26′01″N 96°29′47″W
- Area: 8 acres (3.2 ha)
- Architect: Multiple
- Architectural style: Late Victorian, Late 19th And 20th Century Revivals, Moderne
- NRHP reference No.: 95000091
- Added to NRHP: February 17, 1995

The Fremont Historic Commercial District is a 8 acres (3.2 ha) historic district which was listed on the National Register of Historic Places in 1995. It is roughly bounded by 3rd, Military, Park and D Streets in Fremont, Nebraska.

The district recognizes "an enclave of late 19th- and early 20th-century buildings which represent Fremont's role as a regional center of wholesale and retail commerce." It is an asymmetrical-shaped district which has parts of seven city blocks in the central business district of Fremont. The listing included 43 contributing buildings and 27 non-contributing ones.
