= Hooper Historic District =

Historic district in Nebraska, United States

- U.S. National Register of Historic Places
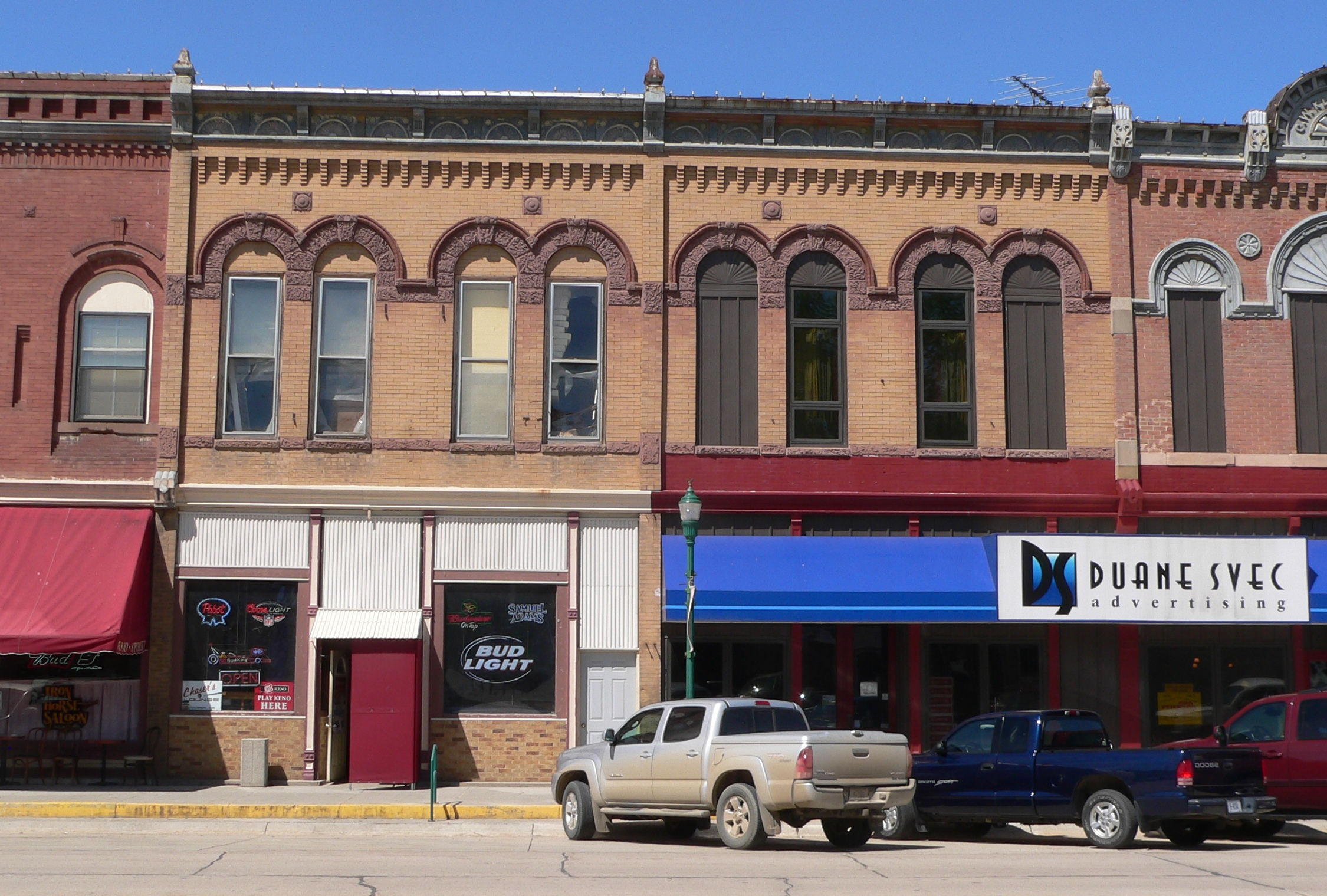

- Location within Nebraska Location within the United States
- Location: Main, Elk, Fulton and Myrtle Sts., Hooper, Nebraska
- Coordinates: 41°36′41″N 96°32′51″W
- Area: 4 acres (1.6 ha)
- Architectural style: Italianate, Romanesque
- NRHP reference No.: 80002445
- Added to NRHP: May 8, 1980

The Hooper Historic District, in Hooper, Nebraska, is a 4 acres (1.6 ha) historic district which was listed on the National Register of Historic Places in 1980. The listing included 22 contributing buildings.

It mostly consists of one- and two-story commercial structures, and it includes Italianate architecture.
