= Zweibel Farmstead =

- U.S. National Register of Historic Places
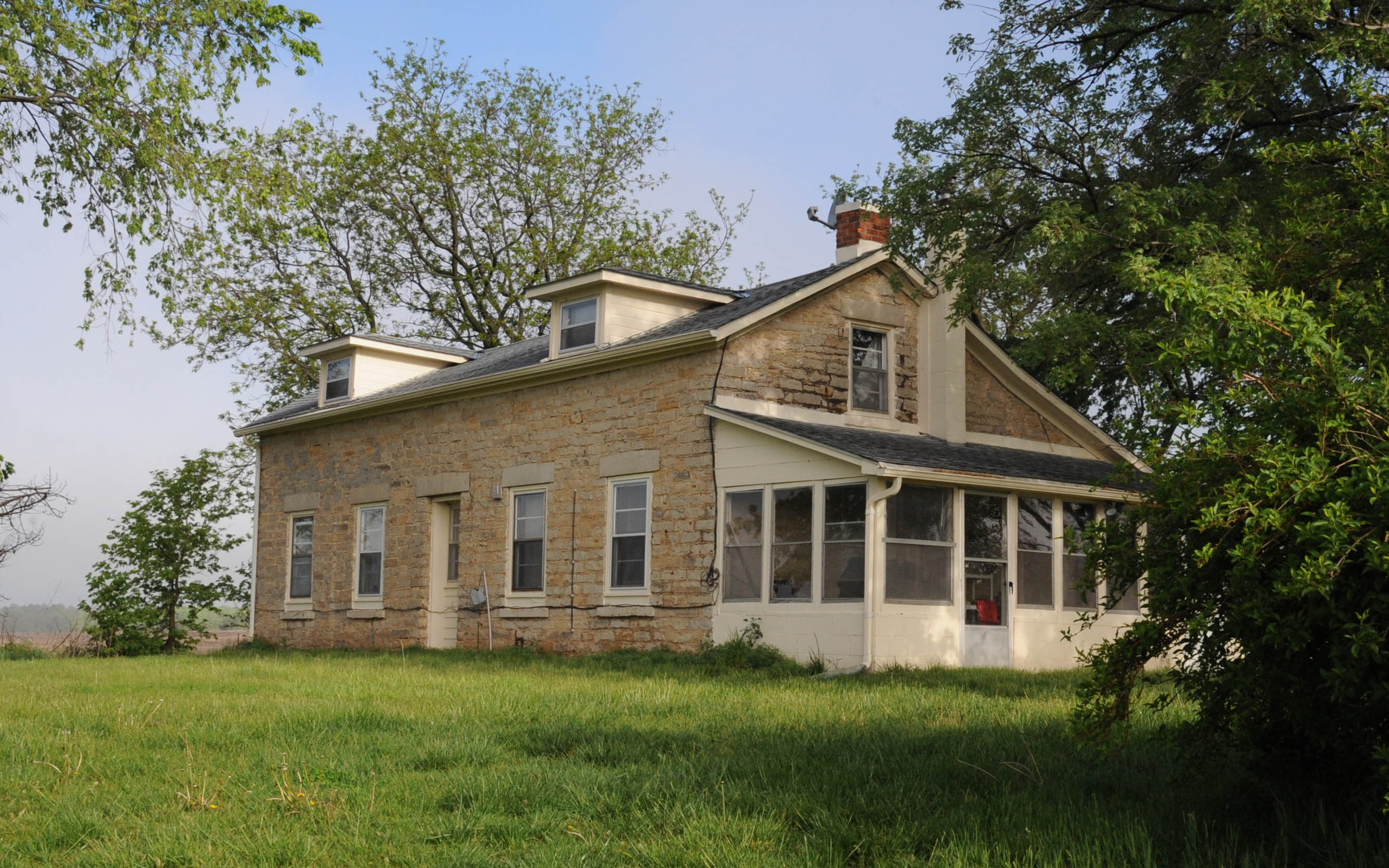
- The house in 2016

- Location within Nebraska Location within the United States
- Nearest city: Papillion, Nebraska
- Coordinates: 41°04′29″N 96°00′42″W
- Area: 4 acres (1.6 ha)
- NRHP reference No.: 00001377
- Added to NRHP: November 30, 2000

The Zweibel Farmstead is a historic estate with a farm house and several outbuildings in Papillion, Nebraska, United States. It was established by George Zweibel and his wife Sophia. The house was built with limestone in 1867, followed by a barn, also built with limestone, in 1871. The property was inherited by their descendants, who lived in the house until the 1960s. It has been listed on the National Register of Historic Places since November 30, 2000.
