= R. B. Schneider House =

- U.S. National Register of Historic Places
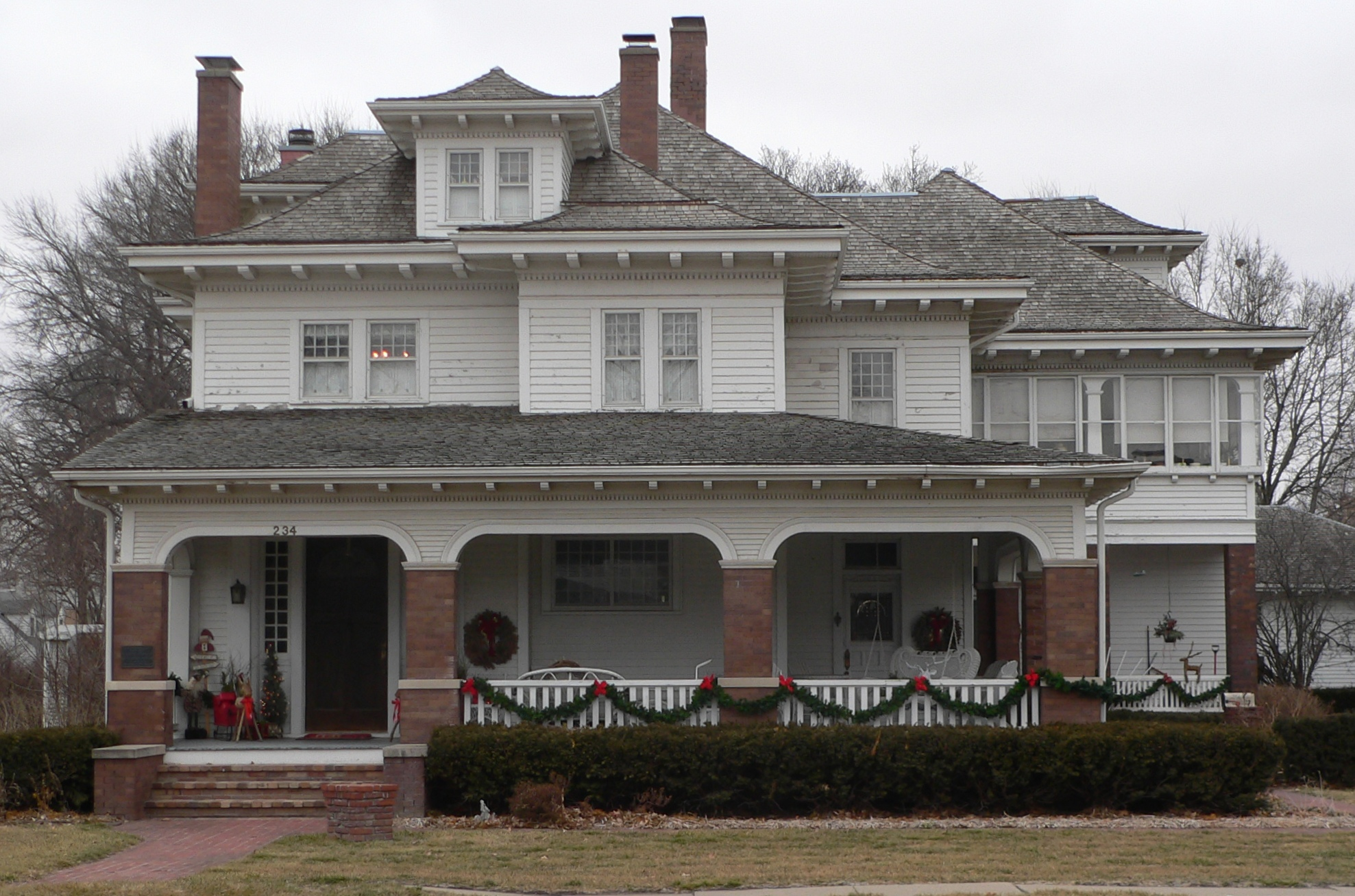
- The house in 2012

- Location within Nebraska Location within the United States
- Location: 234 West 10th Street, Fremont, Nebraska
- Coordinates: 41°26′20″N 96°29′57″W
- Area: less than one acre
- Built: 1887
- Architectural style: Classical Revival, Queen Anne
- NRHP reference No.: 82003186
- Added to NRHP: July 15, 1982

The R.B. Schneider House is a historic house in Fremont, Nebraska. It was built in 1887 for R. B. Schneider, a businessman and politician. It was expanded by A. H. Dyer in 1897 and Simon Koberlin in 1909, and remodelled into residential apartments by Thorvald Jensen in 1947. It was designed in the Classical Revival and Queen Anne architectural styles. It has been listed on the National Register of Historic Places since July 15, 1982.
