= Presbyterian Church (Bellevue, Nebraska) =

Historic church in Nebraska, United States

- U.S. National Register of Historic Places
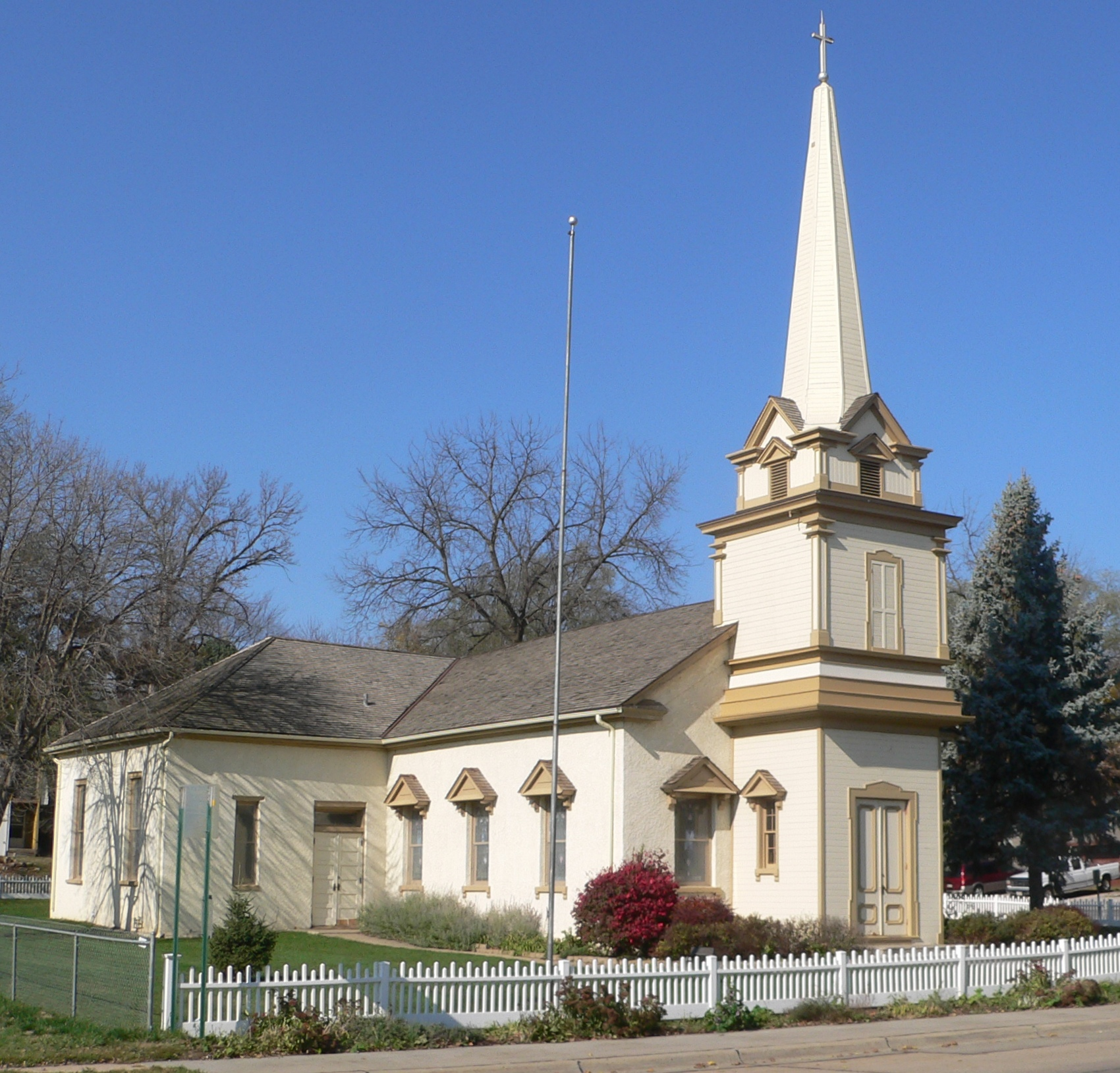

- Location within Nebraska Location within the United States
- Location: 2002 Franklin St., Bellevue, Nebraska
- Coordinates: 41.13934295607116°N 95.89402963636884°W
- Area: 0.5 acres (0.20 ha)
- Built: c.1856-58
- Built by: Reed, D.E.
- Architectural style: Greek Revival, Italianate
- NRHP reference No.: 70000377
- Added to NRHP: October 15, 1970

Presbyterian Church is a church at 2002 Franklin Street in Bellevue, Nebraska, United States, that was built c.1856-58, and has been believed to be the oldest surviving building in Nebraska that was built to hold religious services. It is also believed to be one of few surviving buildings in Nebraska that show original Greek Revival architectural influence.

The congregation of the church was founded in 1859 and, in 1970, was believed to be the oldest church congregation in the state.

The church was added to the National Register in 1970. The congregation survives as the First Presbyterian Church of Bellevue.
