= Bellevue, Nebraska =

City in Sarpy County, Nebraska, United States

- City
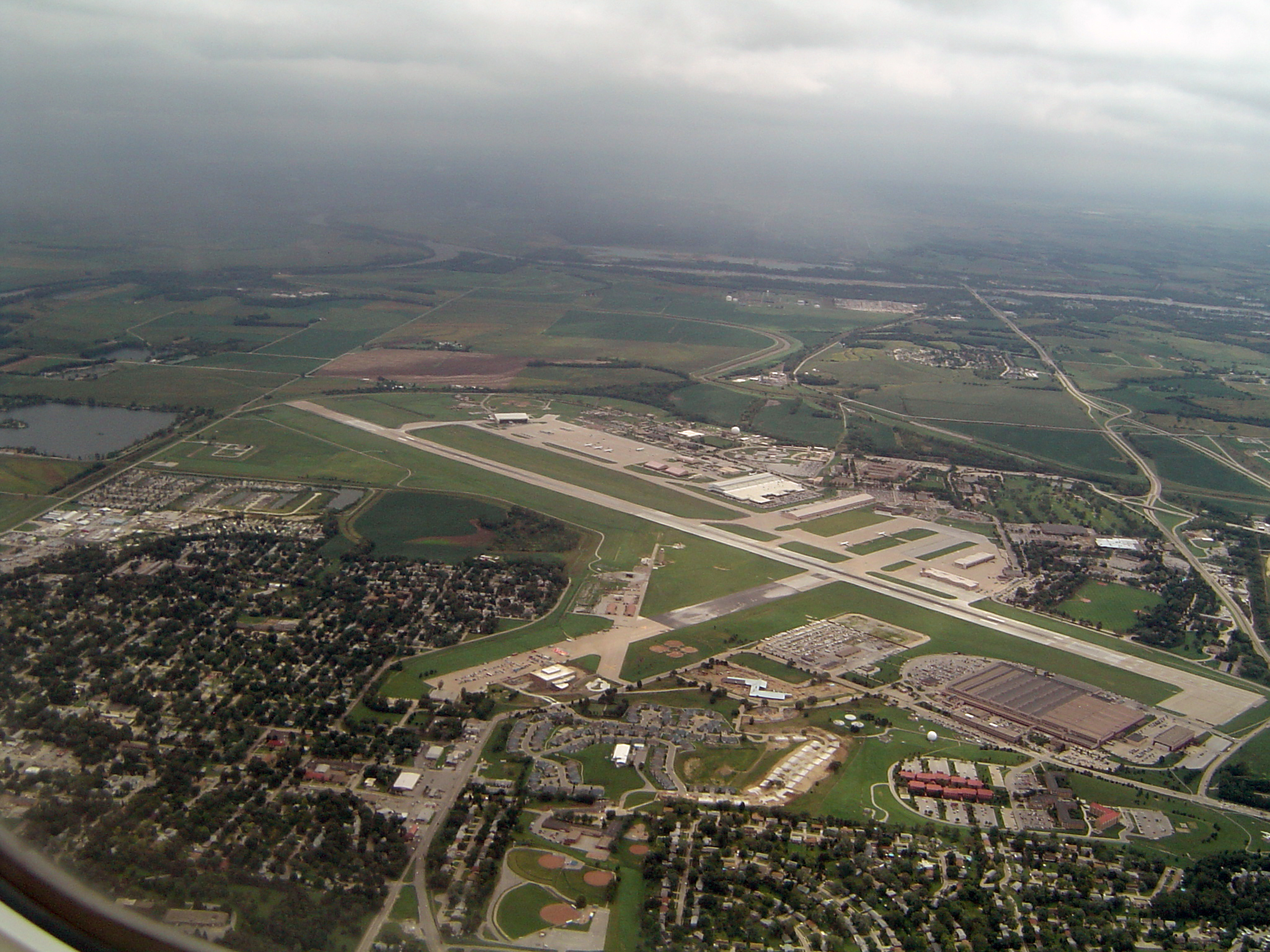
- Aerial view of Offutt Air Force Base with Bellevue in foreground, August 2007

- Seal Logo

- Location of Bellevue within Nebraska and Sarpy County
- Coordinates: 41°09′31″N 95°56′03″W
- Country: United States
- State: Nebraska
- County: Sarpy

Government
  - Type: Strong mayor–council
  - Mayor: Rusty Hike (R)

Area
  - Total: 21.71 sq mi (56.24 km^{2})
  - Land: 21.49 sq mi (55.65 km^{2})
  - Water: 0.23 sq mi (0.59 km^{2})
- Elevation: 1,001 ft (305 m)

Population (2020)
  - Total: 64,176
  - Density: 2,986.7/sq mi (1,153.17/km^{2})
- Time zone: UTC−6 (Central (CST))
  - Summer (DST): UTC−5 (CDT)
- Area code: 402/531
- FIPS code: 31-03950
- GNIS feature ID: 2394120
- Website: www.bellevue.net/%20bellevue.net

Bellevue (French for 'beautiful view'; previously named Belleview) is a suburban city in Sarpy County, Nebraska, United States. It is part of the Omaha–Council Bluffs metropolitan area, and had a population of 64,176 as of the 2020 census, making it the 3rd most populous city in Nebraska, behind Omaha and Lincoln.

== History ==
Established by European Americans in the 1830s, Bellevue was incorporated in 1855 and is the oldest continuously inhabited town in Nebraska. It has been credited by the Nebraska State Legislature as being the state's second-oldest incorporated settlement after Nebraska City; previously it served as the seat of government in Nebraska.

On May 12, 1908, a tornado hit Bellevue, leading to 20 deaths and $50,000 of damages.

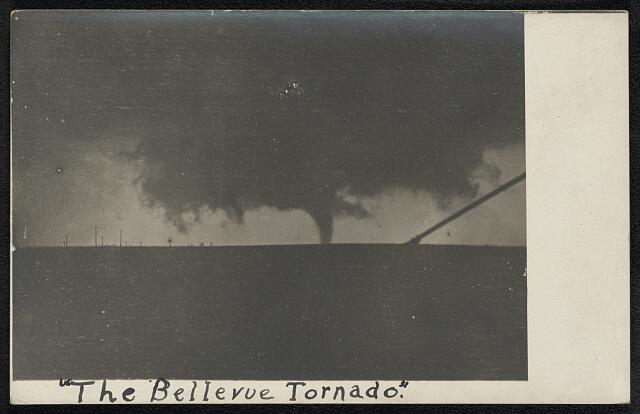
The Bellevue Tornado, 12 May 1908

Bellevue was originally founded as a trading post for the Missouri Fur Company by Joshua Pilcher, but there were financial problems, and, eventually, Lucien Fontanelle became the owner of the post, and the first permanent resident of Bellevue. Moses Merrill founded a mission, which was the first Christian mission in Nebraska, in Bellevue. Since it was the oldest city in the Nebraska Territory, the residents were optimistic that Bellevue would become the capital of it, and the new territorial governor, Francis Burt, had already moved there, but shortly after, he died. The next governor selected Omaha as the capital instead. In 1921, the Offutt Air Force Base, housing the United States Strategic Command, was built south of Bellevue. The planes that dropped the Hiroshima and Nagasaki atomic bombs were built there.

The 2019 Midwestern U.S. floods destroyed about 200 homes from the swelling of the Missouri River.

== Geography ==
Bellevue is located at an elevation of 1159 ft (353 m). According to the United States Census Bureau, the city has a total area of 16.02 square miles (41.49 km^{2}), of which 15.85 square miles (41.05 km^{2}) is land and 0.17 square miles (0.44 km^{2}) is water. It is bounded on the east by the Missouri River.

== Demographics ==
Historical population
Census	Pop.	Note	%±
1880	211		—
1890	754		257.3%
1900	527		−30.1%
1910	596		13.1%
1920	695		16.6%
1930	1,017		46.3%
1940	1,184		16.4%
1950	3,858		225.8%
1960	8,831		128.9%
1970	21,953		148.6%
1980	21,813		−0.6%
1990	39,240		79.9%
2000	44,382		13.1%
2010	50,137		13.0%
2020	64,176		28.0%
U.S. Decennial Census; 2018 Estimate

=== 2020 census ===
As of the 2020 census, Bellevue had a population of 64,176, with 24,765 households and 16,481 families. The population density was 2,986.3 per square mile (1,153.2/km^{2}).

100.0% of residents lived in urban areas, while 0.0% lived in rural areas.

Among the 24,765 households, 32.6% had children under the age of 18 living in them. Of all households, 49.5% were married-couple households, 18.0% were households with a male householder and no spouse or partner present, and 25.4% were households with a female householder and no spouse or partner present. About 26.6% of all households were made up of individuals and 10.4% had someone living alone who was 65 years of age or older. The average household size was 2.6 and the average family size was 3.1.

There were 25,888 housing units. The homeowner vacancy rate was 0.7% and the rental vacancy rate was 6.9%.

The median age was 35.6 years. 24.8% of residents were under the age of 18 and 14.8% were 65 years of age or older. For every 100 females there were 98.0 males, and for every 100 females age 18 and over there were 95.2 males age 18 and over.

Racial composition as of the 2020 census
Race	Number	Percent
White	46,056	71.8%
Black or African American	3,768	5.9%
American Indian and Alaska Native	537	0.8%
Asian	1,570	2.4%
Native Hawaiian and Other Pacific Islander	107	0.2%
Some other race	4,275	6.7%
Two or more races	7,863	12.3%
Hispanic or Latino (of any race)	10,858	16.9%

The 2016–2020 5-year American Community Survey estimates show that the median household income was $70,647 (with a margin of error of +/- $3,370) and the median family income $83,314 (+/- $3,240). Males had a median income of $43,827 (+/- $2,037) versus $30,511 (+/- $1,063) for females. The median income for those above 16 years old was $37,239 (+/- $1,595). Approximately, 6.8% of families and 9.1% of the population were below the poverty line, including 10.8% of those under the age of 18 and 6.4% of those ages 65 or over.

=== 2010 census ===
At the 2010 census there were 50,137 people, 19,142 households, and 13,371 families living in the city. The population density was 3,163.2 inhabitants per square mile (1,221.3/km^{2}). There were 20,591 housing units at an average density of 1,299.1 per square mile (501.6/km^{2}). The racial makeup of the city was 81.5% White, 6.0% African American, 0.7% Native American, 2.3% Asian, 0.2% Pacific Islander, 5.4% from other races, and 3.9% from two or more races. Hispanic or Latino of any race were 11.9%.

Of the 19,142 households 36.1% had children under the age of 18 living with them, 51.9% were married couples living together, 13.0% had a female householder with no husband present, 5.0% had a male householder with no wife present, and 30.1% were non-families. 24.3% of households were one person and 7.9% were one person aged 65 or older. The average household size was 2.62 and the average family size was 3.11.

The median age was 34.8 years. 26.4% of residents were under the age of 18; 9.8% were between the ages of 18 and 24; 26.7% were from 25 to 44; 25.6% were from 45 to 64; and 11.5% were 65 or older. The gender makeup of the city was 49.2% male and 50.8% female.

=== 2000 census ===
At the 2000 census, there were 44,382 people, 16,937 households, and 11,940 families living in the city. The population density was 3,346.4 inhabitants per square mile (1,292.1/km^{2}). There were 17,439 housing units at an average density of 1,314.9 per square mile (507.7/km^{2}). The racial makeup of the city was 85.83% White, 6.13% African American, 0.50% Native American, 2.11% Asian, 0.11% Pacific Islander, 2.78% from other races, and 2.54% from two or more races. Hispanic or Latino of any race were 5.88% of the population.

Of the 16,937 households 35.5% had children under the age of 18 living with them, 55.4% were married couples living together, 11.3% had a female householder with no husband present, and 29.5% were non-families. 23.2% of households were one person and 6.6% were one person aged 65 or older. The average household size was 2.61 and the average family size was 3.09.

The age distribution was 27.4% under the age of 18, 10.2% from 18 to 24, 31.0% from 25 to 44, 21.8% from 45 to 64, and 9.6% 65 or older. The median age was 34 years. For every 100 females, there were 98.3 males. For every 100 females age 18 and over, there were 95.6 males.

The median household income was $47,201 and the median family income was $54,422. Males had a median income of $33,819 versus $25,783 for females. The per capita income for the city was $20,903. About 4.1% of families and 5.9% of the population were below the poverty line, including 7.9% of those under age 18 and 3.8% of those age 65 or over.

== Education ==
School districts including portions of Bellevue include:

- Bellevue Public Schools
- Omaha Public Schools
- Papillion-La Vista Community Schools
- Springfield Platteview Community Schools

== Transportation ==
Transit service in the city is provided by Metro Transit. The Route 95 Bellevue Express runs weekdays only to downtown Omaha.

== Notable people ==
- Buddy Carlyle, Major League Baseball pitcher and coach
- Henry T. Clarke Sr., merchant and legislator, father of Henry Clarke
- Henry Clarke, legislator and professional baseball player
- Tyler Cloyd, professional baseball pitcher
- Abbie Cornett, Nebraska state legislator
- William Forsee, Presidential elector
- Bob Gibson, professional baseball player
- Leisha Hailey, actress, musician
- Robert Hays, actor
- Manny Lawson, professional football player
- Gisela McDaniel (born 1995), indigenous Chamorro visual artist, born in Bellevue
- Thakoon Panichgul, Thai-American fashion designer
- Todd Pratt, professional baseball player (former New York Mets catcher)
- Don Preister, Nebraska state senator
- Molly Schuyler, competitive eating champion
- Terry D. Scott, tenth Master Chief Petty Officer of the Navy (MCPON)
- Erick Strickland, professional basketball player (NBA)
- Yvonne Turner, professional basketball player (WNBA)
- Regis F. A. Urschler, USAF Brigadier General and P-51 air show pilot

== See also ==
- List of municipalities in Nebraska
- Great Plains Art Museum
- Moses Merill Mission
- Nebraska Medicine- Bellevue
- Sarpy County Historical Museum
