= List of United States post offices in Nebraska =

United States post offices operate under the authority of the United States Post Office Department (1792–1971) or the United States Postal Service (since 1971). Historically, post offices were usually placed in a prominent location. Many were architecturally distinctive, including notable buildings featuring Beaux-Arts, Art Deco, and Vernacular architecture. However, modern U.S. post offices were generally designed for functionality rather than architectural style.

Following is a list of United States post offices in Nebraska. Notable post offices include individual buildings, whether still in service or not, which have architectural, historical, or community-related significance. Many of these are listed on the National Register of Historic Places (NRHP) or state and local historic registers. Some are also included in the multiple-site listing "Nebraska Post Offices Which Contain Section Artwork MPS" from 1991.

Post office	City	Date built	Image	Architect	Notes	Ref.
Farmers State Bank (Adams, Nebraska)	Adams	1908		unknown	(Note: Listed on the National Register of Historic Places.) (Note: No longer operates as a post office.)	
United States Post Office (Albion, Nebraska)	Albion	1939		Louis A. Simon	(Note: Houses the New Deal mural Nebraska in Winter by Jenne Magafan)	
Auburn United States Post Office	Auburn	1936–1937		Louis A. Simon, Neal A. Melick	(Note: Nouses the New Deal mural Threshing by Ethel Magafan.)	
United States Post Office (Crawford, Nebraska)	Crawford	1938–1939		Louis A, Simon	(Note: Houses the New Deal mural The Crossing by G. Glenn Newell.)	
United States Post Office (David City, Nebraska)	David City	1934–1935				
Old Fremont Post Office	Fremont	1893		Willoughby J. Edbrooke, Charles W. Guindele		
Geneva United States Post Office	Geneva	1930–1940		Louis A. Simon	(Note: Houses the New Deal mural Building a Sod House by Edward Chavez.)	
Grand Island United States Post Office and Courthouse	Grand Island	1908		James Knox Taylor		
Hebron United States Post Office	Hebron	1937		Louis A. Simon, Neal A. Melick	(Note: Houses the New Deal mural Stampeding Buffaloes Stopping the Train by Eldora Lorenzini.)	
U.S. Post Office (Kearney, Nebraska), now the Museum of Nebraska Art	Kearney	1911		James Knox Taylor		
United States Post Office (Lexington, Nebraska)	Lexington	1934–1935				
Minden United States Post Office	Minden	1936–1937		Louis A. Simon	(Note: Houses the New Deal mural 1848, Fort Kearny, Protectorate on the Overland Trail, 1871 by William E.L. Bunn.)	
U.S. Post Office (Nebraska City, Nebraska), now Nebraska City Farmers Bank	Nebraska City	1888		Mifflin E. Bell		
United States Post Office and Courthouse (Norfolk, Nebraska), now the McMill Building	Norfolk	1904		James Knox Taylor		
North Platte U.S. Post Office and Federal Building	North Platte	1913		James Knox Taylor		
United States Post Office (O'Neill, Nebraska)	O'Neill	1936–1937		Louis A. Simon, Neal A. Melick	(Note: Houses the New Deal mural Baling Hay in Holt County in the Early Days by Eugene Trentham.)	
United States Post Office (Ogallala, Nebraska)	Ogallala	1937–1938		Louis A. Simon	(Note: Houses the New Deal mural Longhorns by Frank Mechau.)	
Old Post Office (Omaha, Nebraska)	Omaha	1898– 1906		John Latenser Sr.	(Note: Ceased being used as a post office in the early 1960s, and was demolished in 1966.)	
Federal Office Building (Omaha, Nebraska)	Omaha	1932–1934		Thomas R. Kimball, William L. Steele, Josiah D. Sandham (Kimball, Steele & Sandham) and George B. Prinz		
Benson Station Post Office (Omaha, Nebraska)	Omaha	1941				
United States Post Office (O’Neill, Nebraska)	O’Neill	1937			(Note: Houses the New Deal mural Baling Hay in Holt County in the Early Days by Eugene Trentham.)	
United States Post Office (Ord, Nebraska)	Ord	1940				
United States Post Office (Pawnee City, Nebraska)	Pawnee City	1940–1941		Louis A. Simon, Neal A. Melick	(Note: Houses the New Deal mural The Auction by Kenneth Evett.)	
Red Cloud United States Post Office	Red Cloud	1941		Louis A. Simon	(Note: Houses three New Deal murals, Moving Westward, Stockade Builders, and Loading Cattle by Archie Musick.)	
United States Post Office (Schuyler, Nebraska)	Schuyler	1940		Louis A. Simon	(Note: Houses the New Deal mural Wild Horses by Moonlight by Philip Von Saltza.)	
United States Post Office (Scottsbluff, Nebraska)	Scottsbluff	1930		James A. Wetmore		
United States Post Office (Seward, Nebraska)	Seward	1936				
United States Post Office (Superior, Nebraska)	Superior	1935				
United States Post Office (Tecumseh, Nebraska)	Tecumseh	1937–1938				
United States Post Office-Valentine, now Cherry County Sawer Memorial Library Educational Service Unit 1	Valentine	1939		Louis A. Simon	(Note: Houses the New Deal mural End of the Line by Kady Faulkner.)	
Wayne United States Post Office	Wayne	1934–1935		Louis A. Simon		
Western Post Office, aka Saline County Bank	Western	1887		unknown		
