= Farwell House =

Farwell House or Farwell Site may refer to:

in the United States

(by state)

- Farwell Barn, Mansfield, Connecticut, on University of Connecticut campus, also site of former Farwell House, now an archeological site
- S.S. Farwell House, Monticello, Iowa, NRHP-listed, listed on the NRHP in Jones County, Iowa
- R.H. Farwell House, Cambridge, Massachusetts, NRHP-listed
- Farwell Archeological District, DuBois, Nebraska, listed on the NRHP in Pawnee County, Nebraska
- Corban C. Farwell Homestead, Harrisville, New Hampshire, listed on the NRHP in Cheshire County, New Hampshire
- Farwell's Point Mound Group, Madison, Wisconsin, listed on the NRHP in Dane County, Wisconsin

== See also ==
- Farwell Building, Detroit, Michigan
- Farwell Mill, Lisbon, Maine
- Farwell School, Charlestown, New Hampshire, listed on the NRHP in Sullivan County, New Hampshire
