= National Register of Historic Places listings in Holt County, Nebraska =

Location of Holt County in Nebraska

Holt County, Nebraska, United States, has 12 properties and districts listed on the National Register of Historic Places.

This National Park Service list is complete through NPS recent listings posted October 30, 2026.

== Current listings ==
	Name on the Register	Image	Date listed	Location	City or town	Description
1	W.J. Biglin House	W.J. Biglin House	April 27, 2022 (#100007506)	615 East Douglas St. 42°27′27″N 98°38′40″W	O'Neill	
2	Eagle Creek Archeological Site		October 1, 1974 (#74001119)	Address Restricted	O'Neill	
3	Golden Hotel	Golden Hotel	November 27, 1989 (#89002040)	406 E. Douglas St. 42°27′29″N 98°38′49″W	O'Neill	
4	Holt County Courthouse	Holt County Courthouse	July 5, 1990 (#90000974)	N. 4th St. between E. Clay and Benton Sts. 42°27′34″N 98°38′49″W	O'Neill	
5	Old Nebraska State Bank Building	Old Nebraska State Bank Building	October 1, 1974 (#74001120)	Douglas and 4th Sts. 42°27′26″N 98°38′49″W	O'Neill	
6	O'Neill Carnegie Library	O'Neill Carnegie Library	July 13, 2018 (#100002665)	601 E Douglas St. 42°27′28″N 98°38′40″W	O'Neill	
7	Redbird I Site		November 21, 1974 (#74001121)	Hilltop in the east central portion of Section 11, Township 32 North, Range 10 West; 42°46′00″N 98°26′40″W	Redbird	
8	Rouse Ranch	Rouse Ranch	September 4, 2013 (#13000674)	88780 495th Ave. 42°41′41″N 98°35′57″W	O'Neill vicinity	
9	St. Patrick’s Catholic Church	St. Patrick’s Catholic Church	July 1, 2020 (#100005337)	301 East Benton St. 42°27′36″N 98°38′54″W	O'Neill	
10	St. Peter de Alcantara Church and Rectory		September 30, 2026 (#100013434)	220 US Hwy 275; 42°15′33″N 98°20′54″W	Ewing	
11	Brantly Sturdevant House	Brantly Sturdevant House	March 25, 1999 (#99000387)	308 S. Main St. 42°31′44″N 98°58′43″W	Atkinson	
12	US Post Office-O'Neill	US Post Office-O'Neill	May 11, 1992 (#92000479)	204 N. 4th St. 42°27′33″N 98°38′53″W	O'Neill	One of 12 Nebraska post offices featuring a Section of Fine Arts mural, "Baling Hay in Holt County in the Early Days" (1938) by Eugene Trentham.

== See also ==
- List of National Historic Landmarks in Nebraska
- National Register of Historic Places listings in Nebraska
