= Lindsley House =

Lindsley House may refer to:

- Lindsley House (St. Augustine, Florida), listed on the National Register of Historic Places (NRHP) in Florida
- Lindsley House (Table Rock, Nebraska), listed on the National Register of Historic Places in Pawnee County, Nebraska
- Perry Lindsley House, Neenah, Wisconsin, listed on the National Register of Historic Places listings in Winnebago County, Wisconsin
