= Lloyd House =

Lloyd House may refer to:

== People ==
- Lloyd House (politician), Arizona state representative from 1967 to 1968

== Buildings ==
in the Netherlands

- Lloyd Hotel, Dutch national monument in Amsterdam

in the United Kingdom

- Lloyd House, Birmingham

in the United States (by state then city)

- Harold Lloyd Estate, Beverly Hills, California, listed on the National Register of Historic Places (NRHP) in Los Angeles County
- Lloyd House, Pasadena, California, a dormitory in the House system at Caltech
- Jason Skinner House, Harwinton, Connecticut, also known as Lloyd House, NRHP-listed
- Lloyd–Bond House, Lloyd, Florida, listed on the NRHP in Jefferson County
- Henry Demarest Lloyd House, Winnetka, Illinois, listed on the NRHP in Cook County
- James M. Lloyd House, Mt. Washington, Kentucky, listed on the NRHP in Bullitt County
- Chase–Lloyd House, Annapolis, Maryland, a National Historic Landmark and NRHP-listed in Anne Arundel County
- Harold Lloyd Birthplace, Burchard, Nebraska, listed on the NRHP in Pawnee County
- Joseph Lloyd House, Huntington, New York, listed on the NRHP in Suffolk County
- Leech–Lloyd Farmhouse and Barn Complex, Lima, New York, listed on the NRHP in Livingston County
- Thomas F. Lloyd Historic District, Carrboro, North Carolina, listed on the NRHP in Orange County
- Mason–Lloyd–Wiley House, Chapel Hill, North Carolina, historic house, home of Thomas F. Lloyd
- Lloyd–Howe House, Pinehurst, North Carolina, listed on the NRHP in Moore County
- John Uri Lloyd House, Cincinnati, Ohio, listed on the NRHP in Hamilton County
- Lloyd House (Alexandria, Virginia), listed on the NRHP
