= Dan Atkinson (disambiguation) =

Dan Atkinson may refer to

- Dan Atkinson (born 1961), British journalist and author
- Daniel Atkinson (born 2001), Australian rugby league footballer
- Daniel Atkinson (biochemist) (1921–2024), American biochemist
