= E. F. Hempstead House =

- U.S. National Register of Historic Places
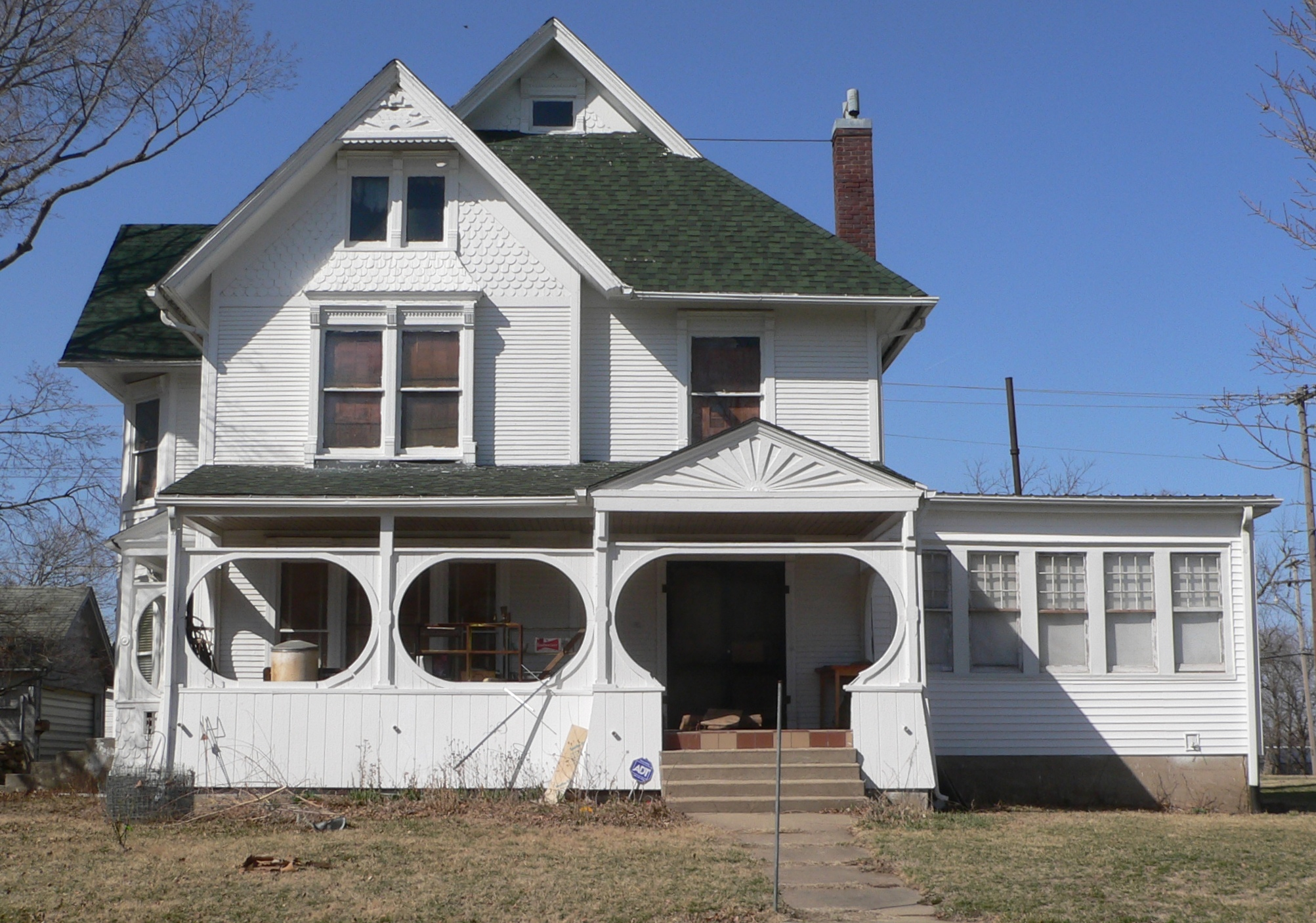
- The house in 2012

- Location within Nebraska Location within the United States
- Location: 14th and H Street, Pawnee City, Nebraska
- Coordinates: 40°06′59″N 96°09′07″W
- Area: less than one acre
- Built: 1887
- Architectural style: Queen Anne
- NRHP reference No.: 82000611
- Added to NRHP: October 19, 1982

The E. F. Hempstead House is a historic two-and-a-half-story house in Pawnee City, Nebraska. It was built in 1887-1888 for E. F. Hempstead, a banker and businessman. It was designed in the Queen Anne style, with "porch walls faced with imbricated shingles and pierced with vents of open latticework." Moreover, "Columns above support oval shaped openings ending in circular finials at the entries." The house has been listed on the National Register of Historic Places since October 19, 1982.
