= Mir-278 microRNA precursor family =

mir-278

Identifiers
- Symbol: mir-278
- Rfam: RF00729
- miRBase family: 3

Other data
- RNA type: microRNA
- Domain(s): Eukaryota;
- PDB structures: PDBe

In molecular biology mir-278 microRNA is a short RNA molecule belonging to a class of molecules referred to as microRNAs. These function to regulate the expression levels of other genes by several mechanisms, primarily binding to their target at its 3'UTR.

== Mis- and altered expression in Drosophila ==
miR-278 affects energy metabolism in the Drosophila melanogaster species. Elevated insulin production has been observed in miR-278 mutants, due to insulin resistance in the absence of this microRNA. miR-278 is now known to act through regulation of the expanded gene transcript, and most likely through further miR-278 targets as well.

Misexpression in the developing eye has been found to result in overgrowth, partially through apoptotic inhibition. There is a single base substitution which blocks the gain-of-function phenotype, indicating the acquisition of novel functions by misexpressed miRNAs which bring about unscheduled cell proliferation in vivo. This is reflective of a microRNA potential in the promotion of tumour formation.

== See also ==
- MicroRNA
