= Burchard, Nebraska =

- Village
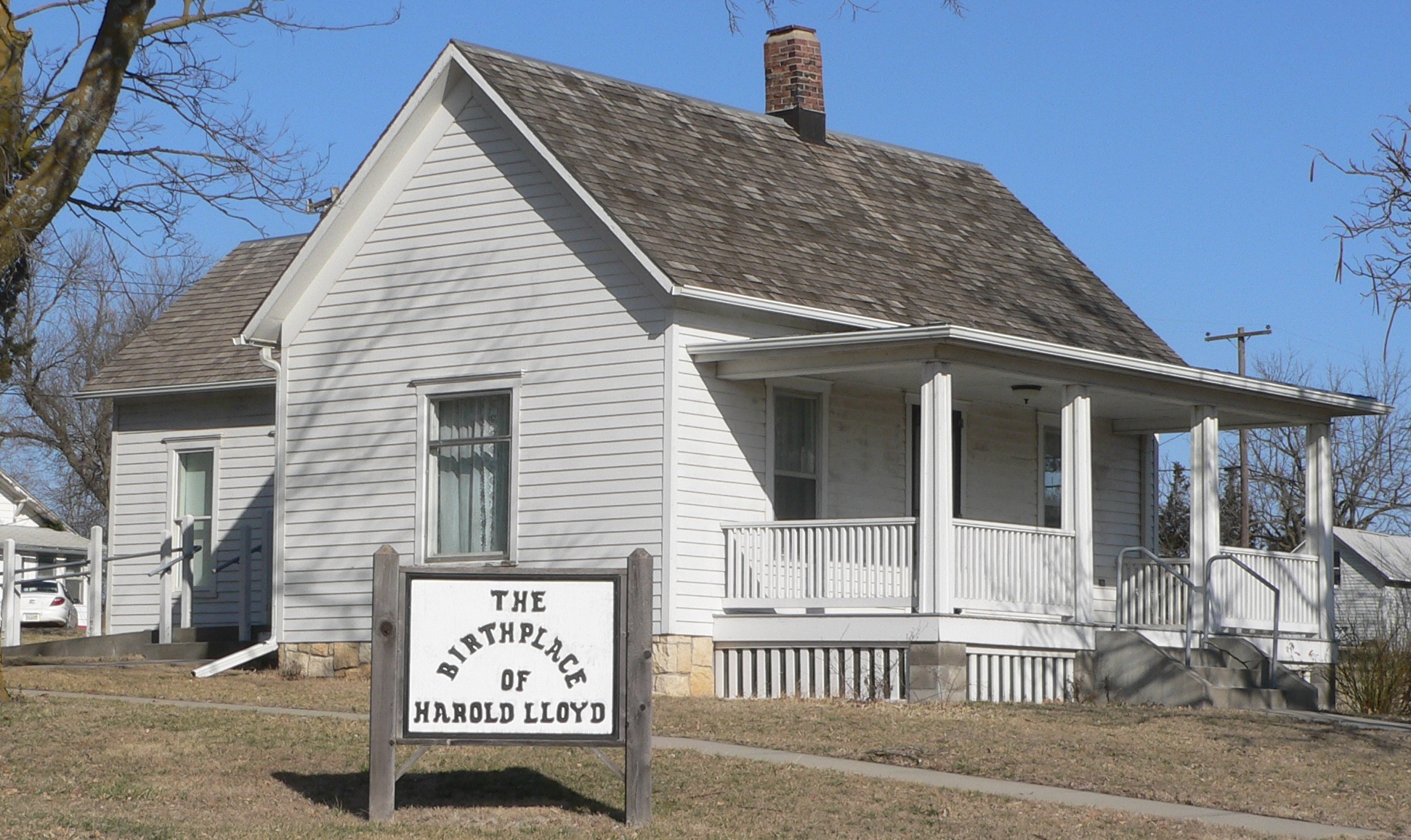
- Birthplace of actor Harold Lloyd in Burchard.

- Location of Burchard, Nebraska
- Coordinates: 40°08′58″N 96°20′56″W
- Country: United States
- State: Nebraska
- County: Pawnee

Area
  - Total: 0.16 sq mi (0.42 km^{2})
  - Land: 0.16 sq mi (0.42 km^{2})
  - Water: 0 sq mi (0.00 km^{2})
- Elevation: 1,411 ft (430 m)

Population (2020)
  - Total: 78
  - Estimate (2024): 77
  - Density: 480/sq mi (190/km^{2})
- Time zone: UTC-6 (Central (CST))
  - Summer (DST): UTC-5 (CDT)
- ZIP codes: 68323, 68380
- Area code: 402
- FIPS code: 31-07065
- GNIS feature ID: 2397496

Burchard is a village in Pawnee County, Nebraska, United States. The population was 78 at the 2020 census. The village is approximately 10 miles from the Nebraska-Kansas border and ten miles west of Pawnee City.

== History ==
Burchard was platted in 1881 when the Chicago, Burlington & Quincy Railroad was extended to that point. The community was named after a local clergyman. Burchard was incorporated as a village in 1884.

== Geography ==
According to the United States Census Bureau, the village has a total area of 0.16 square miles (0.41 km^{2}), all land.

== Demographics ==
Historical population
Census	Pop.	Note	%±
1890	201		—
1900	297		47.8%
1910	315		6.1%
1920	265		−15.9%
1930	275		3.8%
1940	289		5.1%
1950	201		−30.4%
1960	132		−34.3%
1970	131		−0.8%
1980	122		−6.9%
1990	105		−13.9%
2000	103		−1.9%
2010	82		−20.4%
2020	76		−7.3%
2024 (est.)	77	▲	1.3%
U.S. Decennial Census

=== 2010 census ===
As of the census of 2010, there were 82 people, 34 households, and 23 families residing in the village. The population density was 512.5 inhabitants per square mile (197.9/km^{2}). There were 45 housing units at an average density of 281.3 per square mile (108.6/km^{2}). The racial makeup of the village was 100.0% White.

There were 34 households, of which 32.4% had children under the age of 18 living with them, 52.9% were married couples living together, 8.8% had a female householder with no husband present, 5.9% had a male householder with no wife present, and 32.4% were non-families. 29.4% of all households were made up of individuals, and 23.5% had someone living alone who was 65 years of age or older. The average household size was 2.41 and the average family size was 3.04.

The median age in the village was 48 years. 26.8% of residents were under the age of 18; 7.4% were between the ages of 18 and 24; 12.2% were from 25 to 44; 23.2% were from 45 to 64; and 30.5% were 65 years of age or older. The gender makeup of the village was 46.3% male and 53.7% female.

=== 2000 census ===
As of the census of 2000, there were 103 people, 42 households, and 28 families residing in the village. The population density was 649.7 inhabitants per square mile (250.9/km^{2}). There were 52 housing units at an average density of 328.0 per square mile (126.6/km^{2}). The racial makeup of the village was 100 White and 3 Asian.

There were 42 households, out of which 14 had children under the age of 18 living with them, 26 were married couples living together, 3 had a female householder with no husband present, and 13 were non-families. 11 of all households were made up of individuals, and 7 had someone living alone who was 65 years of age or older. The average household size was 2.45 and the average family size was 3.03.

In the village, the population was spread out, with 27 under the age of 18, 8 from 18 to 24, 24 from 25 to 44, 20 from 45 to 64, and 24 who were 65 years of age or older. The median age was 43 years. For every 100 females, there were 74.6 males. For every 100 females age 18 and over, there were 72.7 males.

As of 2000 the median income for a household in the village was $30,625, and the median income for a family was $40,000. Males had a median income of $21,250 versus $19,306 for females. The per capita income for the village was $14,390. There were no families and 5.5% of the population living below the poverty line, including no under eighteens and 10.0% of those over 64.

== Notable people ==
- Charles H. Corlett (1889-1971), US Army General
- Harold Lloyd (1893-1971), comedic actor and film producer
- Gaylord Lloyd (1888-1943), actor and assistant film director
- Harlan Pyle (1905-1993), baseball player
