= 5-Methyl-7-methoxyisoflavone =

Names
- IUPAC name 7-Methoxy-5-methylisoflavone
- Systematic IUPAC name 7-Methoxy-5-methyl-3-phenyl-4H-1-benzopyran-4-one
- Other names Methoxyisoflavone

Identifiers
CAS Number	82517-12-2
3D model (JSmol)	Interactive image
ChemSpider	2016043
ECHA InfoCard	100.126.888
PubChem CID	2734290
UNII	NHW23TRU3M
CompTox Dashboard (EPA)	DTXSID201002754
- InChI: InChI=1S/C17H14O3/c1-11-8-13(19-2)9-15-16(11)17(18)14(10-20-15)12-6-4-3-5-7-12/h3-10H,1-2H3 Key: WGOUYULOZZRTFS-UHFFFAOYSA-N; InChI=1/C17H14O3/c1-11-8-13(19-2)9-15-16(11)17(18)14(10-20-15)12-6-4-3-5-7-12/h3-10H,1-2H3 Key: WGOUYULOZZRTFS-UHFFFAOYAN
- SMILES: O=C\1c3c(O/C=C/1c2ccccc2)cc(OC)cc3C

Properties
Chemical formula	C_{17}H_{14}O_{3}
Molar mass	266.296 g·mol^{−1}
- Except where otherwise noted, data are given for materials in their standard state (at 25 °C [77 °F], 100 kPa). Infobox references

5-Methyl-7-methoxyisoflavone, commonly referred to simply as methoxyisoflavone, is a chemical compound marketed as a bodybuilding supplement. However, there is no meaningful clinical evidence to support its usefulness. A study published in 2006 examined the effect of methoxyflavone on training adaptations and markers of muscle anabolism and catabolism. No measurable effects were observed in athletic performance or in levels of testosterone and cortisol.

Consumption of 5-methyl-7-methoxyisoflavone can produce false positive results in urinary tests for cannabinoid use.
