= List of people from Pawnee County, Nebraska =

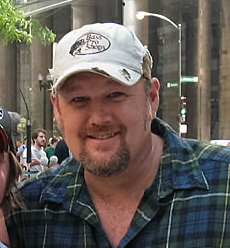
Comedian Larry the Cable Guy was born in Pawnee City, the county seat.

The following is a list of people from Pawnee County, Nebraska. Inclusion on the list should be reserved for notable people from the present and past who have resided in the county.

- David Butler, first governor of Nebraska (1867–1871)
- Charles H. Corlett, major general in the U.S. Army who commanded troops in both the Pacific and European Theaters during World War II
- John H. Eastwood, US Army Air Corps chaplain, World War II
- William Alden Edson, scientist and engineer specializing in vacuum tube oscillators, radar, antennas and microwave technologies
- Lavon Heidemann, state senator (District 1)
- Robert E. Holthus, Thoroughbred racehorse trainer
- Harold Lloyd, silent film actor
- William R. Lyman, football player
- Irish McCalla, actress
- Kenneth S. Wherry, U.S. Senator from Nebraska 1943–51; Senate Republican Leader
- Daniel Lawrence Whitney, comedian known as "Larry the Cable Guy"
