= United States Post Office (Pawnee City, Nebraska) =

- US Post Office--Pawnee City
- U.S. National Register of Historic Places
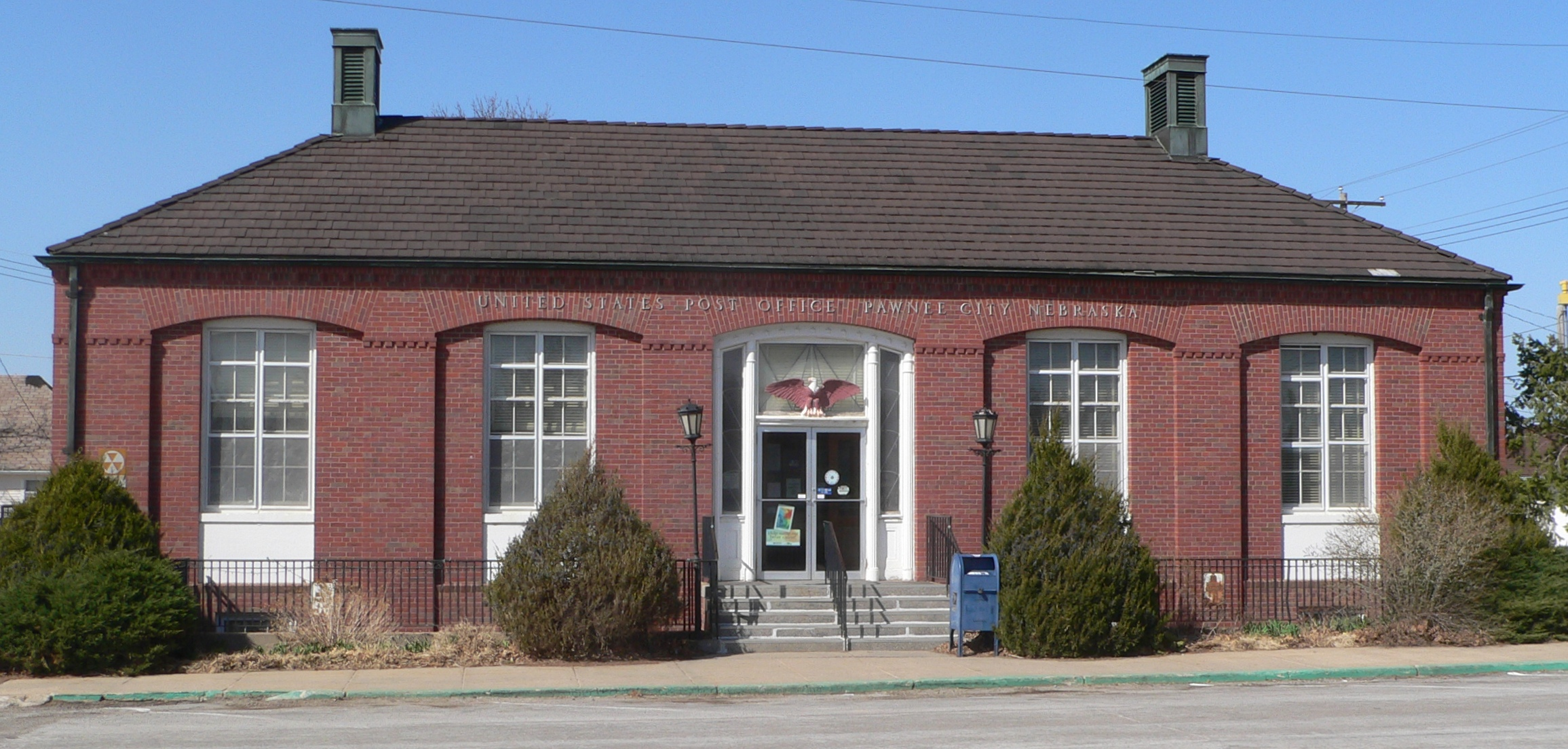
- The building in 2012

- Location within Nebraska Location within the United States
- Location: 703 G Street, Pawnee City, Nebraska
- Coordinates: 40°06′35″N 96°09′11″W
- Area: less than one acre
- Built: 1942
- Architect: Louis A. Simon
- Architectural style: Colonial Revival
- MPS: Nebraska Post Offices Which Contain Section Artwork MPS
- NRHP reference No.: 92000472
- Added to NRHP: May 11, 1992

The United States Post Office is a historic building in Pawnee City, Nebraska. It was built in 1940–1941, and designed in the Classical Revival style by architect Louis A. Simon. Inside, there is a mural by Kenneth Evett, completed in 1942. The building has been listed on the National Register of Historic Places since May 11, 1992.
