= Pawnee County, Nebraska =

County in Nebraska, United States

- County
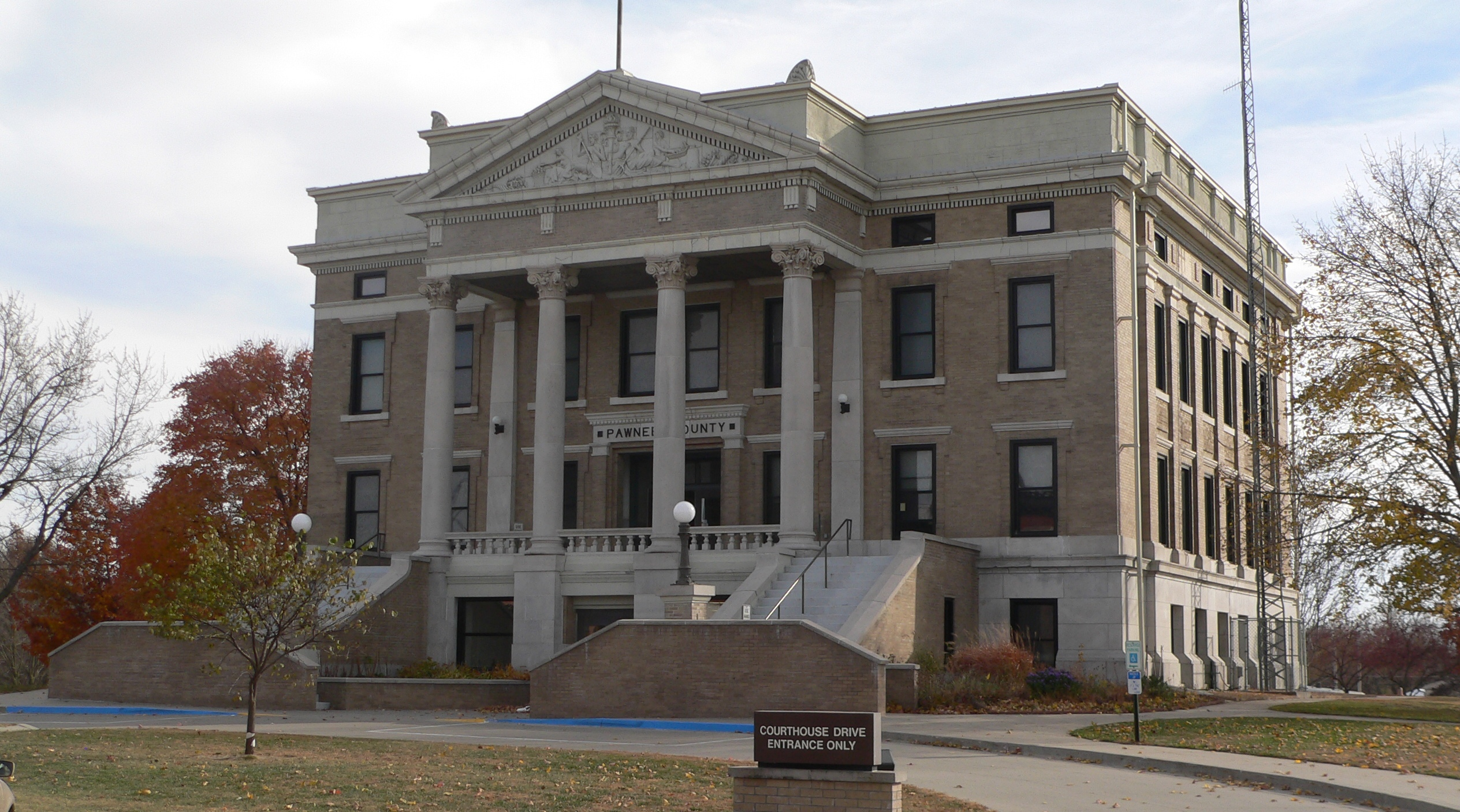
- Pawnee County Courthouse in Pawnee City

- Location within the U.S. state of Nebraska
- Coordinates: 40°08′N 96°14′W
- Country: United States
- State: Nebraska
- Founded: 1854
- Named for: Pawnee people
- Seat: Pawnee City
- Largest city: Pawnee City

Area
  - Total: 433 sq mi (1,120 km^{2})
  - Land: 431 sq mi (1,120 km^{2})
  - Water: 1.9 sq mi (4.9 km^{2}) 0.4%

Population (2020)
  - Total: 2,544
  - Estimate (2025): 2,510 ▼
  - Density: 5.8/sq mi (2.2/km^{2})
- Time zone: UTC−6 (Central)
  - Summer (DST): UTC−5 (CDT)
- Congressional district: 3rd
- Website: pawneecountyne.gov

Pawnee County is a county in the U.S. state of Nebraska. As of the 2020 United States census, the population was 2,544. Its county seat is Pawnee City.

In the Nebraska license plate system, Pawnee County is represented by the prefix 54 (it had the fifty-fourth-largest number of vehicles registered in the county when the license plate system was established in 1922).

== History ==
=== County Formation ===
Pawnee County was formed in 1854. It was named for the Pawnee Native American tribe.

=== Pawnee County Formation ===
Pawnee County was formed in 1854. It was named for the Pawnee Native American tribe.

=== Irving Tornado Family ===
On May 30, 1879, a violent long-track tornado tracked through Pawnee County during a major Midwestern severe weather outbreak. Retrospectively rated F4 on the Fujita scale, the primary vortex developed near Randolph, Kansas, before widening into a destructive 800-yard-wide track that extended for roughly 100 miles into Richardson County, Nebraska. The storm caused severe regional devastation, killing at least 18 people and injuring over 60 along its path, including the near-total destruction of the town of Irving, Kansas. The historic disaster was extensively cataloged in the field by U.S. Signal Service meteorologist John Park Finley, forming the foundational basis for early American severe storm research and convective forecasting models.

=== 2026 Tornado ===
On May 18, 2026, the county was struck by a severe stovepipe tornado during a multi-day regional severe weather outbreak. At 4:44 PM CDT, the National Weather Service (NWS) confirmed a tornado on the ground moving toward Pawnee City, prompting the issuance of a rare, high-tier Tornado Emergency under a "Particularly Dangerous Situation" alert. The destructive vortex tracked northeastward through southeastern portions of the county toward Du Bois before crossing into neighboring Richardson County, Nebraska, stripping residential roofs and leaving localized structural damage to rural farmsteads along its path. Preliminary ratings from the NWS indicate EF2+ intensity, though an official Enhanced Fujita (EF) rating has not yet been issued.

== Geography ==
Pawnee County lies on the south line of Nebraska. Its south boundary line abuts the north boundary line of the state of Kansas. The Big Nemaha River flows southeastward through the NE corner of the county, and smaller local drainages flow upward through the county to discharge into the Big Nemaha. The county's terrain consists of rolling hills, with its planar areas largely devoted to agriculture. The county has an area of 433 square miles (1,120 km^{2}), of which 431 square miles (1,120 km^{2}) is land and 1.9 square miles (4.9 km^{2}) (0.4%) is water.

=== Major highways ===
- Nebraska Highway 4
- Nebraska Highway 8
- Nebraska Highway 50
- Nebraska Highway 65
- Nebraska Highway 99
- Nebraska Highway 105

=== Adjacent counties ===
- Richardson County − east
- Nemaha County, Kansas − southeast
- Marshall County, Kansas − southwest
- Gage County − west
- Johnson County − north
- Nemaha County − northeast

=== Protected areas ===
- Bowwood State Wildlife Management Area
- Burchard State Wildlife Management Area
- Mayberry State Wildlife Management Area
- Pawnee Prairie State Wildlife Management Area
- Prairie Knoll State Wildlife Management Area
- Table Rock State Wildlife Management Area

== Demographics ==
Historical population
Census	Pop.	Note	%±
1860	882		—
1870	4,171		372.9%
1880	6,920		65.9%
1890	10,340		49.4%
1900	11,770		13.8%
1910	10,582		−10.1%
1920	9,578		−9.5%
1930	9,423		−1.6%
1940	8,514		−9.6%
1950	6,744		−20.8%
1960	5,356		−20.6%
1970	4,473		−16.5%
1980	3,937		−12.0%
1990	3,317		−15.7%
2000	3,087		−6.9%
2010	2,773		−10.2%
2020	2,544		−8.3%
2025 (est.)	2,510	▼	−1.3%

=== 2020 census ===
As of the 2020 census, the county had a population of 2,544. The median age was 47.9 years. 22.0% of residents were under the age of 18 and 28.1% of residents were 65 years of age or older. For every 100 females there were 98.9 males, and for every 100 females age 18 and over there were 96.3 males age 18 and over.

The racial makeup of the county was 96.7% White, 0.2% Black or African American, 0.3% American Indian and Alaska Native, 0.0% Asian, 0.0% Native Hawaiian and Pacific Islander, 0.6% from some other race, and 2.2% from two or more races. Hispanic or Latino residents of any race comprised 1.5% of the population.

0.0% of residents lived in urban areas, while 100.0% lived in rural areas.

There were 1,108 households in the county, of which 25.5% had children under the age of 18 living with them and 23.9% had a female householder with no spouse or partner present. About 32.8% of all households were made up of individuals and 20.3% had someone living alone who was 65 years of age or older.

There were 1,402 housing units, of which 21.0% were vacant. Among occupied housing units, 80.8% were owner-occupied and 19.2% were renter-occupied. The homeowner vacancy rate was 0.5% and the rental vacancy rate was 10.4%.

=== 2000 census ===
As of the 2000 United States census, there were 3,087 people, 1,339 households, and 850 families in the county. The population density was 7 people per square mile (2.7 people/km^{2}). There were 1,587 housing units at an average density of 4 units per square mile (1.5/km^{2}). The racial makeup of the county was 98.87% White, 0.19% Native American, 0.26% Asian, 0.03% from other races, and 0.65% from two or more races. 0.68% of the population were Hispanic or Latino of any race.

There were 1,339 households, out of which 24.40% had children under the age of 18 living with them, 54.80% were married couples living together, 5.60% had a female householder with no husband present, and 36.50% were non-families. 32.90% of all households were made up of individuals, and 20.20% had someone living alone who was 65 years of age or older. The average household size was 2.27 and the average family size was 2.86.

The county population contained 22.70% under the age of 18, 5.10% from 18 to 24, 21.00% from 25 to 44, 24.20% from 45 to 64, and 27.10% who were 65 years of age or older. The median age was 46 years. For every 100 females there were 92.50 males. For every 100 females age 18 and over, there were 91.30 males.

The median income for a household in the county was $29,000, and the median income for a family was $36,326. Males had a median income of $24,770 versus $17,976 for females. The per capita income for the county was $16,687. About 6.80% of families and 11.00% of the population were below the poverty line, including 13.60% of those under age 18 and 11.80% of those age 65 or over.

== Communities ==
=== Cities ===
- Pawnee City (county seat)

=== Villages ===
- Burchard
- Du Bois
- Lewiston
- Steinauer
- Table Rock

== Politics ==
Pawnee County voters have been Republican-leaning for decades. In no national election since 1936 has the county selected a Democratic Party candidate.

United States presidential election results for Pawnee County, Nebraska
Year	Republican		Democratic		Third party(ies)	
Year	No.	%	No.	%	No.	%
1900	1,632	56.90%	1,121	39.09%	115	4.01%
1904	1,739	68.38%	562	22.10%	242	9.52%
1908	1,468	54.94%	1,115	41.73%	89	3.33%
1912	593	25.06%	958	40.49%	815	34.45%
1916	1,228	49.66%	1,171	47.35%	74	2.99%
1920	2,510	69.88%	972	27.06%	110	3.06%
1924	2,147	55.85%	1,365	35.51%	332	8.64%
1928	2,825	64.29%	1,547	35.21%	22	0.50%
1932	1,568	36.90%	2,641	62.16%	40	0.94%
1936	2,074	47.09%	2,297	52.16%	33	0.75%
1940	2,643	62.35%	1,596	37.65%	0	0.00%
1944	2,254	63.87%	1,275	36.13%	0	0.00%
1948	1,725	57.58%	1,271	42.42%	0	0.00%
1952	2,432	75.02%	810	24.98%	0	0.00%
1956	1,830	64.17%	1,022	35.83%	0	0.00%
1960	1,728	63.13%	1,009	36.87%	0	0.00%
1964	1,166	51.21%	1,111	48.79%	0	0.00%
1968	1,209	60.30%	583	29.08%	213	10.62%
1972	1,299	71.26%	524	28.74%	0	0.00%
1976	990	52.86%	845	45.11%	38	2.03%
1980	1,418	71.15%	431	21.63%	144	7.23%
1984	1,306	69.32%	552	29.30%	26	1.38%
1988	975	55.46%	767	43.63%	16	0.91%
1992	670	37.06%	566	31.31%	572	31.64%
1996	766	48.82%	580	36.97%	223	14.21%
2000	937	61.69%	522	34.36%	60	3.95%
2004	986	66.49%	481	32.43%	16	1.08%
2008	859	62.07%	483	34.90%	42	3.03%
2012	899	67.04%	400	29.83%	42	3.13%
2016	974	73.40%	279	21.02%	74	5.58%
2020	1,071	74.95%	322	22.53%	36	2.52%
2024	1,085	78.34%	284	20.51%	16	1.16%

== Education ==
School districts include:

- Diller-Odell Public Schools
- Humboldt Table Rock Steinauer Public Schools
- Johnson-Brock Public Schools
- Johnson County Central Public Schools
- Lewiston Consolidated Schools
- Pawnee City Public Schools
- Southern School District 1

== See also ==
- List of people from Pawnee County, Nebraska
- National Register of Historic Places listings in Pawnee County, Nebraska
