= National Register of Historic Places listings in Pawnee County, Nebraska =

Location of Pawnee County in Nebraska

Pawnee County, Nebraska, United States, has 14 properties and districts listed on the National Register of Historic Places. Another two properties were once listed but have been removed.

The locations of National Register properties and districts for which the latitude and longitude coordinates are included below may be seen in a map.

This National Park Service list is complete through NPS recent listings posted October 30, 2026.

== Current listings ==
	Name on the Register	Image	Date listed	Location	City or town	Description
1	Farwell Archeological District		March 4, 1997 (#97000132)	Address Restricted	Du Bois	
2	E. F. Hempstead House	E. F. Hempstead House	October 19, 1982 (#82000611)	14th and H St. 40°06′59″N 96°09′08″W	Pawnee City	
3	Lindsley House	Lindsley House	March 25, 1999 (#99000389)	706 Luzerne St. 40°10′41″N 96°05′55″W	Table Rock	
4	Harold Lloyd Birthplace	Harold Lloyd Birthplace	December 22, 1993 (#93001403)	Northwestern corner of the junction of Pawnee and 4th Sts. 40°08′59″N 96°20′57″W	Burchard	
5	Pawnee City Carnegie Library	Pawnee City Carnegie Library	December 10, 2010 (#10001004)	730 G St. 40°06′36″N 96°09′10″W	Pawnee City	Carnegie Libraries in Nebraska MPS
6	Pawnee City Historic Business District	Pawnee City Historic Business District	February 25, 1994 (#94000066)	Roughly bounded by 5th, 7th, F, and G Sts. 40°06′31″N 96°09′12″W	Pawnee City	
7	Pawnee County Courthouse	Pawnee County Courthouse	January 10, 1990 (#89002232)	625 6th St. 40°06′29″N 96°09′12″W	Pawnee City	
8	Rad Jan Kollar cis 101 Z.C.B.J.	Rad Jan Kollar cis 101 Z.C.B.J.	April 5, 1990 (#90000567)	Address Restricted; 40°03′33″N 96°03′44″W	Du Bois	
9	Rinne Farm	Rinne Farm	March 17, 2015 (#15000089)	71075 617 Ave. 40°07′45″N 96°15′23″W	Pawnee City	
10	Steinauer Opera House	Steinauer Opera House	July 7, 1988 (#88000934)	215 Main; 40°12′27″N 96°14′04″W	Steinauer	
11	Table Rock Archeological Site		July 12, 1974 (#74001135)	Address Restricted	Table Rock	
12	Table Rock Opera House	Table Rock Opera House	September 28, 1988 (#88000931)	Houston St. 40°10′43″N 96°05′48″W	Table Rock	
13	Table Rock Public Square Historic District	Table Rock Public Square Historic District	July 8, 1994 (#94000655)	Roughly bounded by Pennsylvania, Nebraska, Luzerne, and Houston Sts. 40°10′44″N 96°05′42″W	Table Rock	
14	US Post Office-Pawnee City	US Post Office-Pawnee City	May 11, 1992 (#92000472)	703 G St. 40°06′35″N 96°09′12″W	Pawnee City	One of 12 Nebraska post offices featuring a Section of Fine Arts mural, "The Auction" (1942) by Kenneth Evett.

== Former listings ==
	Name on the Register	Image	Date listed	Date removed	Location	City or town	Description
1	Cincinnati Bridge		June 29, 1992 (#92000719)	November 16, 2015	Closed county road over the South Fork of the Big Nemaha River, 1 mile south and 0.2 miles east of Du Bois; 40°00′47″N 96°02′40″W	Du Bois	
2	Hotel Pawnee		July 24, 1974 (#74002289)	March 31, 1978	700 G St.	Pawnee City	Demolished.

== See also ==
- List of National Historic Landmarks in Nebraska
- National Register of Historic Places listings in Nebraska
