= Corban C. Farwell Homestead =

Historic house in New Hampshire, United States

- U.S. National Register of Historic Places
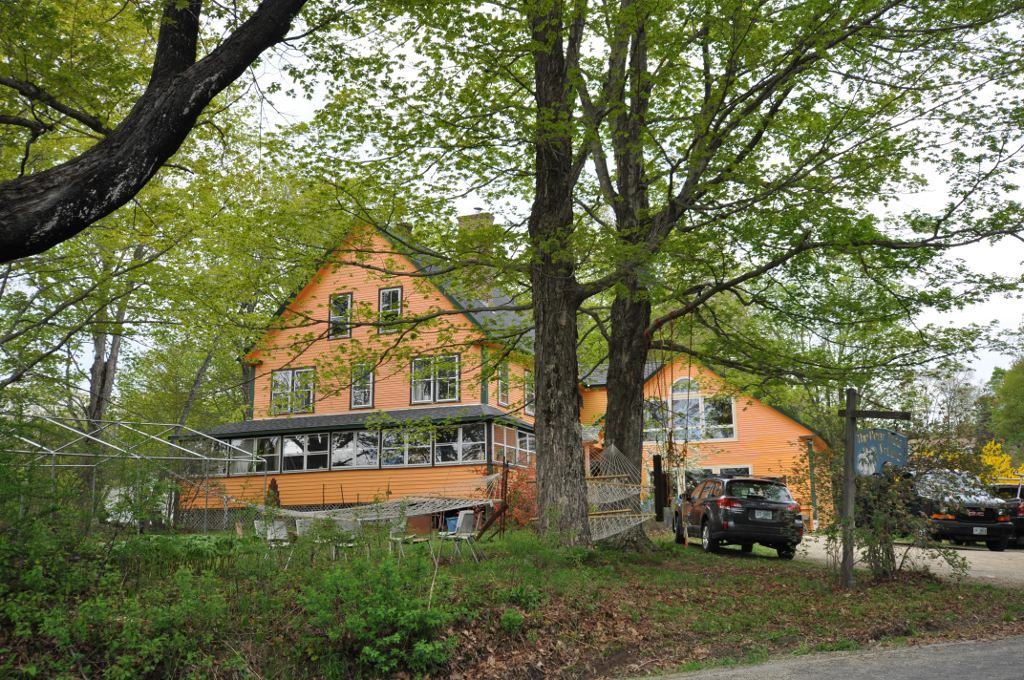

- Location within New Hampshire Location within the United States
- Location: Breed Rd., Harrisville, New Hampshire
- Coordinates: 42°56′34″N 72°8′3″W
- Area: 0.5 acres (0.20 ha)
- Built: 1901
- MPS: Harrisville MRA
- NRHP reference No.: 86003253
- Added to NRHP: January 14, 1988

The Corban C. Farwell Homestead is a historic house at the junction of Breed and Cricket Hill roads in Harrisville, New Hampshire, United States. Built in 1901 by a local farmer, it is an architecturally eclectic mix of Greek Revival, Colonial Revival and Queen Anne styling. It was listed on the National Register of Historic Places in 1988.

== Description and history ==
The Corban Farwell Homestead is located in a rural setting west of the village center of Harrisville, at the junction of Breed and Cricket Hill roads in the town's Silver Lake area. It is a 2 1/2-story wood-frame structure, with a gabled roof and clapboarded exterior. The house is distinctive as a late example of Greek Revival architecture, albeit with a number of Colonial Revival features added, as well as bands of scalloped wood shingles typical of the Queen Anne style. An enclosed porch runs across one facade and along part of another, and the main block is joined to a large carriage house.

Corban Farwell built this house in 1901 on land that had been held among interrelated families since the 18th century. He was a purveyor of farm supplies, selling fresh milk and eggs to the summer residents of the resort community that sprang up around nearby Silver Lake. He also sold land along the lakeshore for expanding that development.

== See also ==
- National Register of Historic Places listings in Cheshire County, New Hampshire
