= Harold Lloyd Birthplace =

- Lloyd, Harold, Birthplace
- U.S. National Register of Historic Places
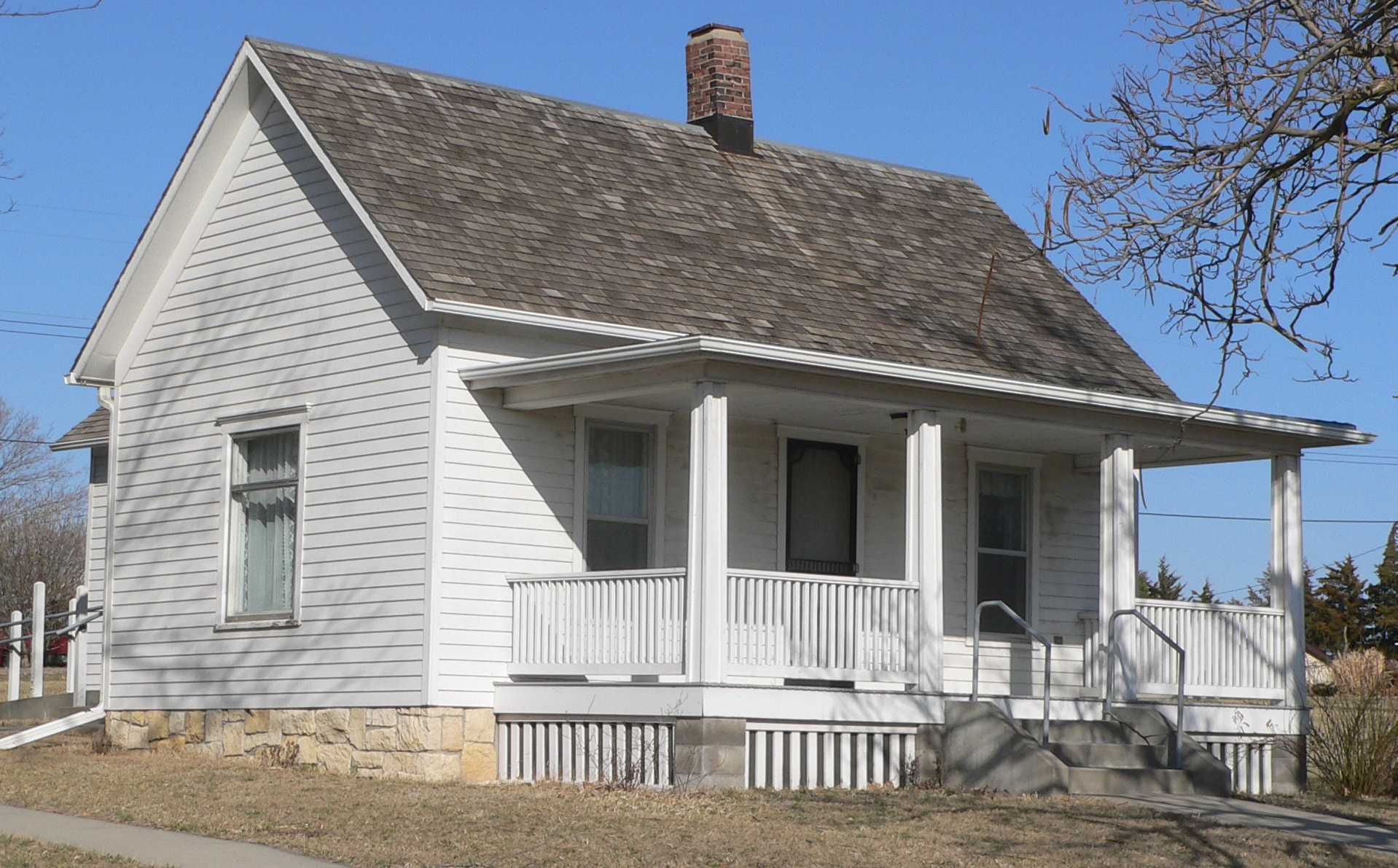
- The house in 2012

- Location within Nebraska Location within the United States
- Location: Junction of Pawnee and 4th Sts., NW corner, Burchard, Nebraska
- Coordinates: 40°08′58″N 96°20′56″W
- Area: less than one acre
- Built: 1893
- NRHP reference No.: 93001403
- Added to NRHP: December 22, 1993

The Harold Lloyd Birthplace is a historic one-story house in Burchard, Nebraska. It was built in 1893 for Harold Lloyd's parents. Lloyd lived in the house until 1897; he later became a silent actor and comedian, and he died in 1971 in Beverly Hills, California. The house has been listed on the National Register of Historic Places since December 22, 1993.

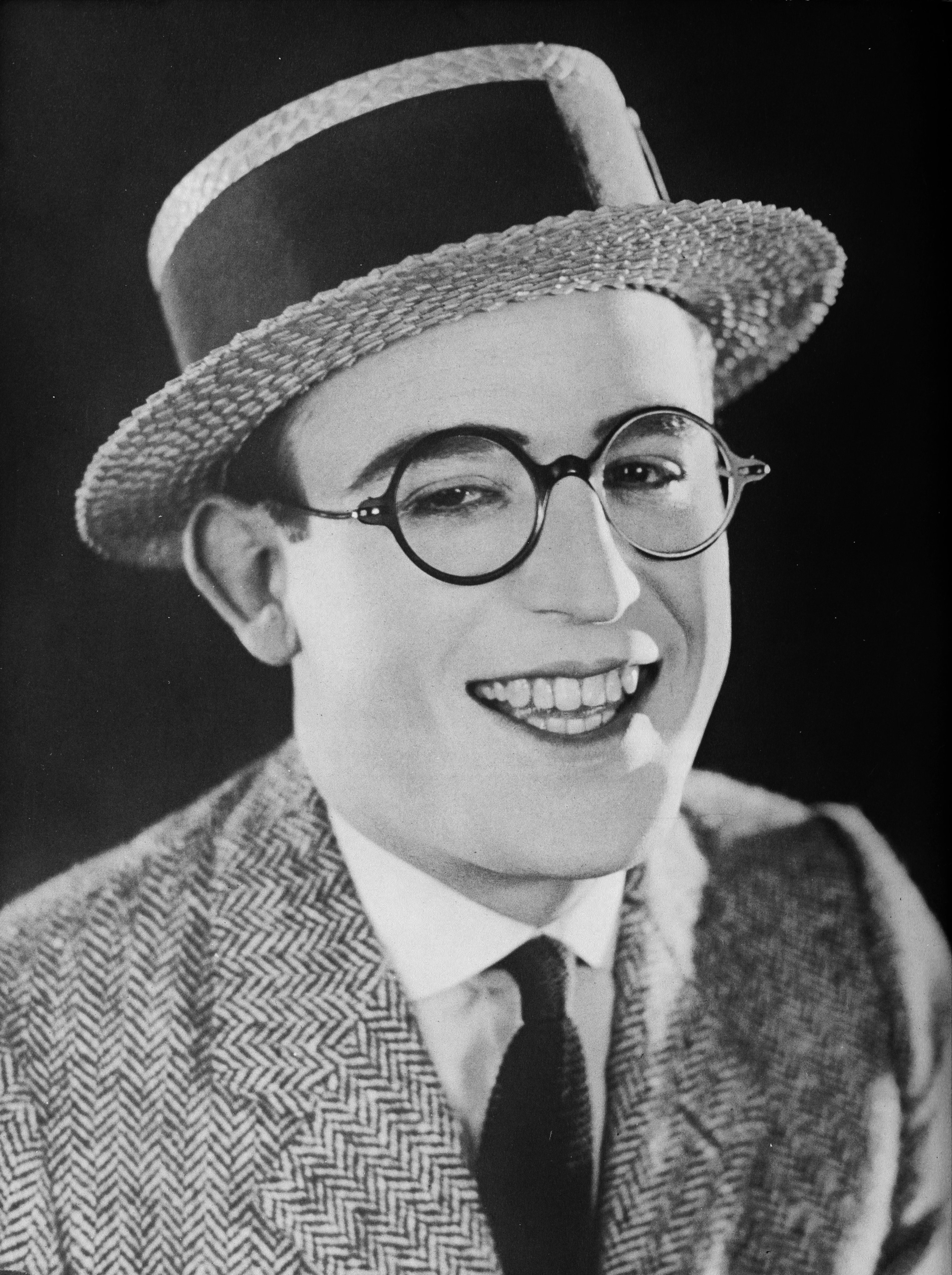
Harry Lloyd in 1924.
