= Wayne United States Post Office =

- U.S. National Register of Historic Places
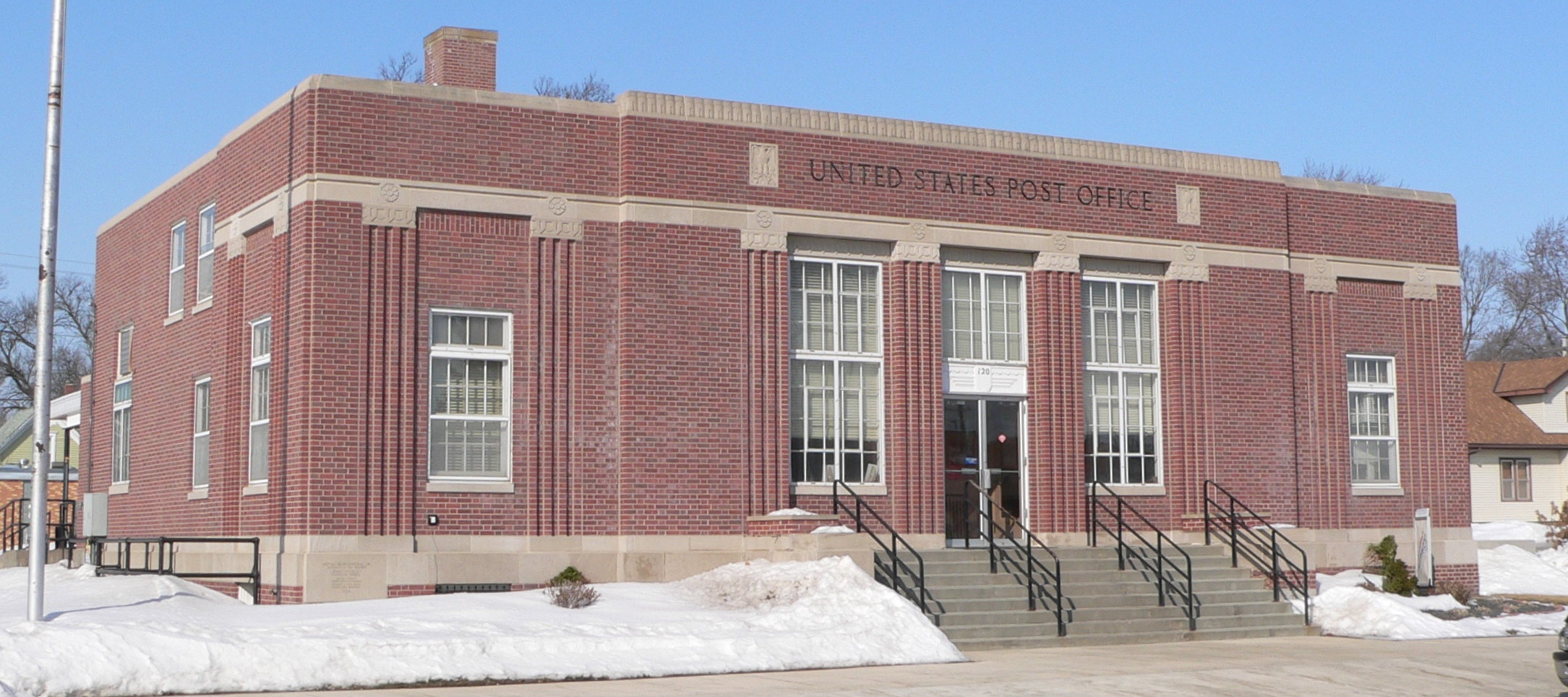

- Location within Nebraska Location within the United States
- Location: 120 Pearl St., Wayne, Nebraska
- Coordinates: 42.23°N 97.019167°W
- Area: less than one acre
- Built: 1934-35
- Architect: Louis A. Simon
- Architectural style: Art Deco
- NRHP reference No.: 07001325
- Added to NRHP: December 27, 2007

The Wayne United States Post Office on Pearl Street in Wayne in Wayne County, Nebraska was built during 1934–35. It was listed on the National Register of Historic Places in 2007.

According to its NRHP nomination, the post office was important as "Many jobs were created in a community that sorely needed them, and a lovely facility was constructed that has contributed to the livability of Wayne as a charming mid-sized community...."
