= Rouse Ranch =

- U.S. National Register of Historic Places
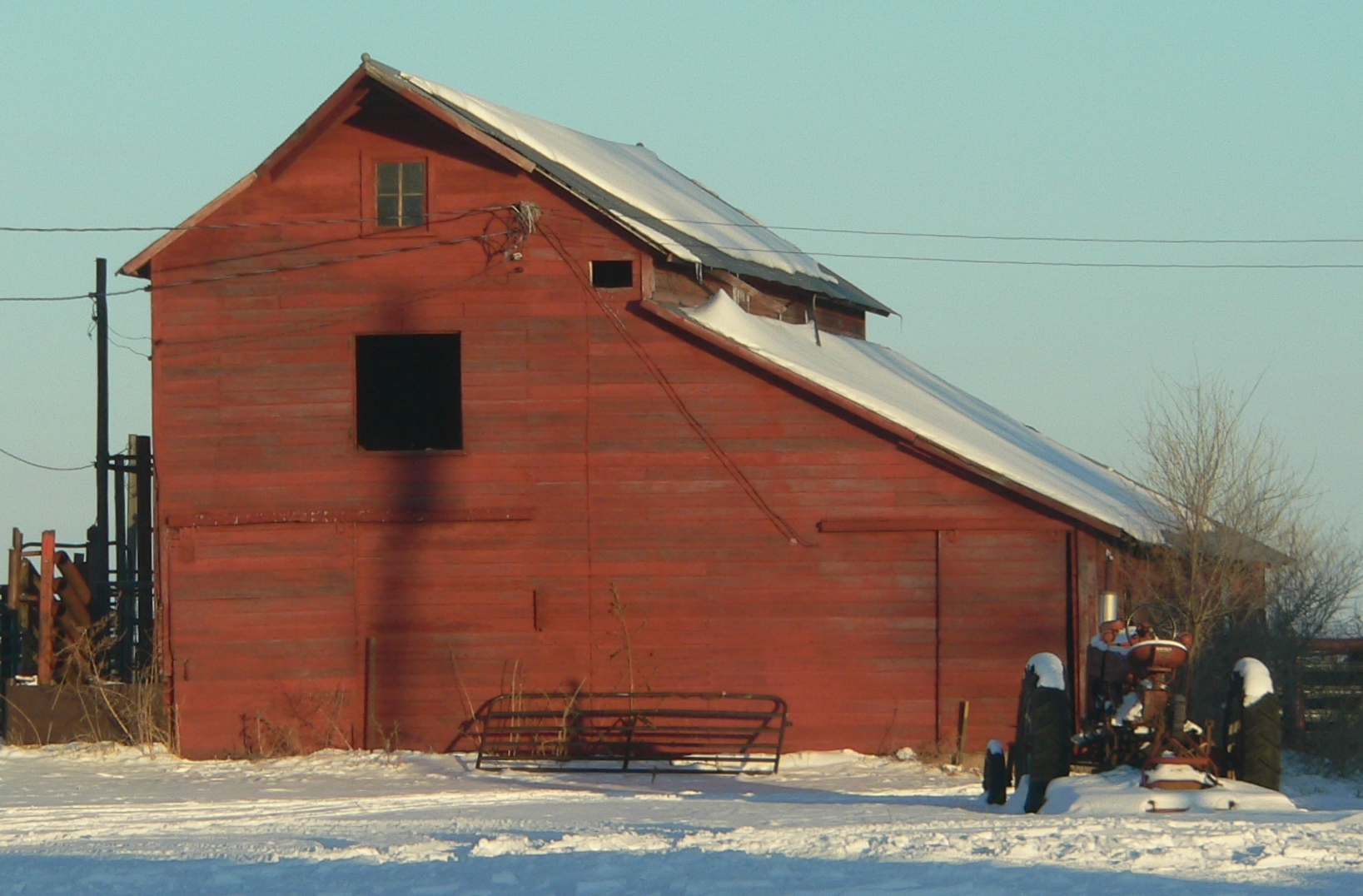

- Location within Nebraska Location within the United States
- Area: 160 acres (65 ha)
- NRHP reference No.: 13000674
- Added to NRHP: September 4, 2013

The Rouse Ranch was listed on the National Register of Historic Places in 2013.

It was deemed significant for its association with the Homestead Act of 1862 and "as one of the last remaining examples of an original homesteaded farm in Holt County, Nebraska, that has remained in the ownership of the original family, and as a prime example of the evolution of farming in the region."

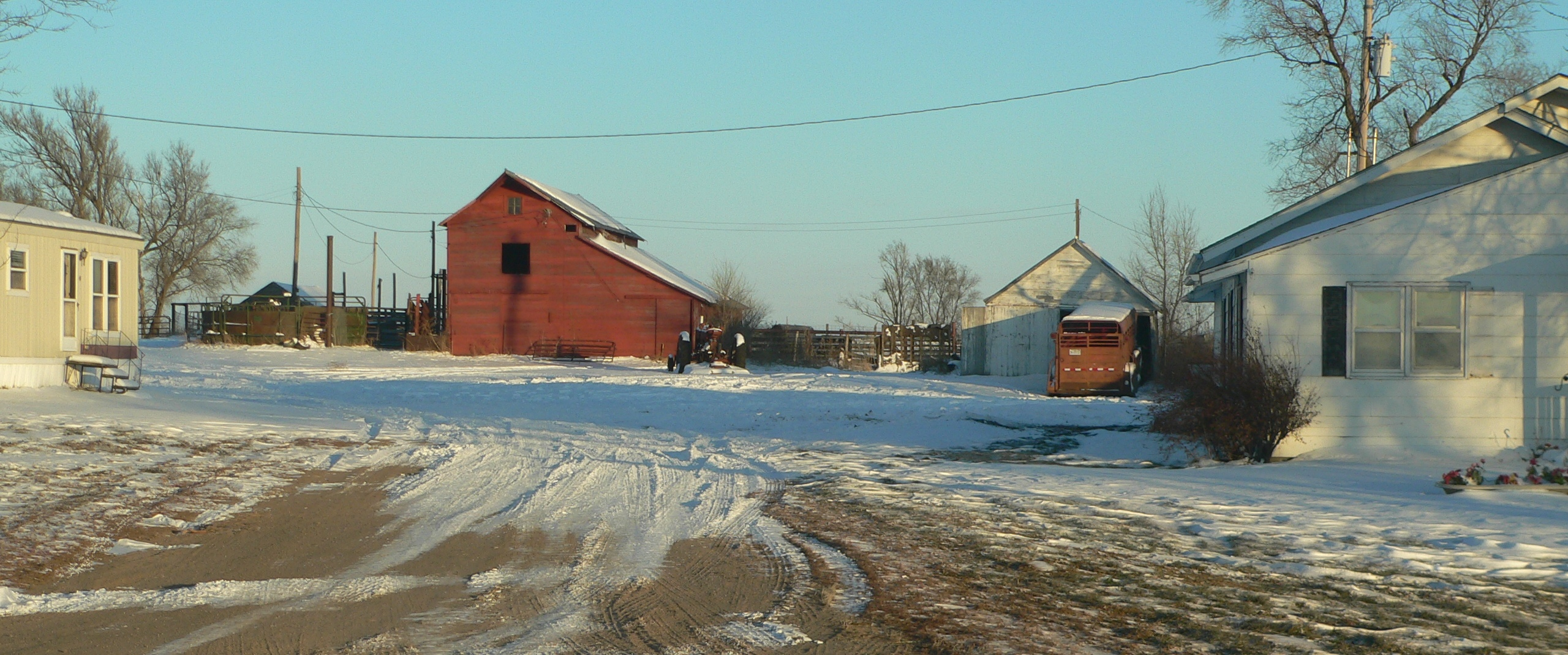

It includes 18 contributing resources and several non-contributing silos.
