= Golden Hotel (O'Neill, Nebraska) =

United States historic place

- U.S. National Register of Historic Places
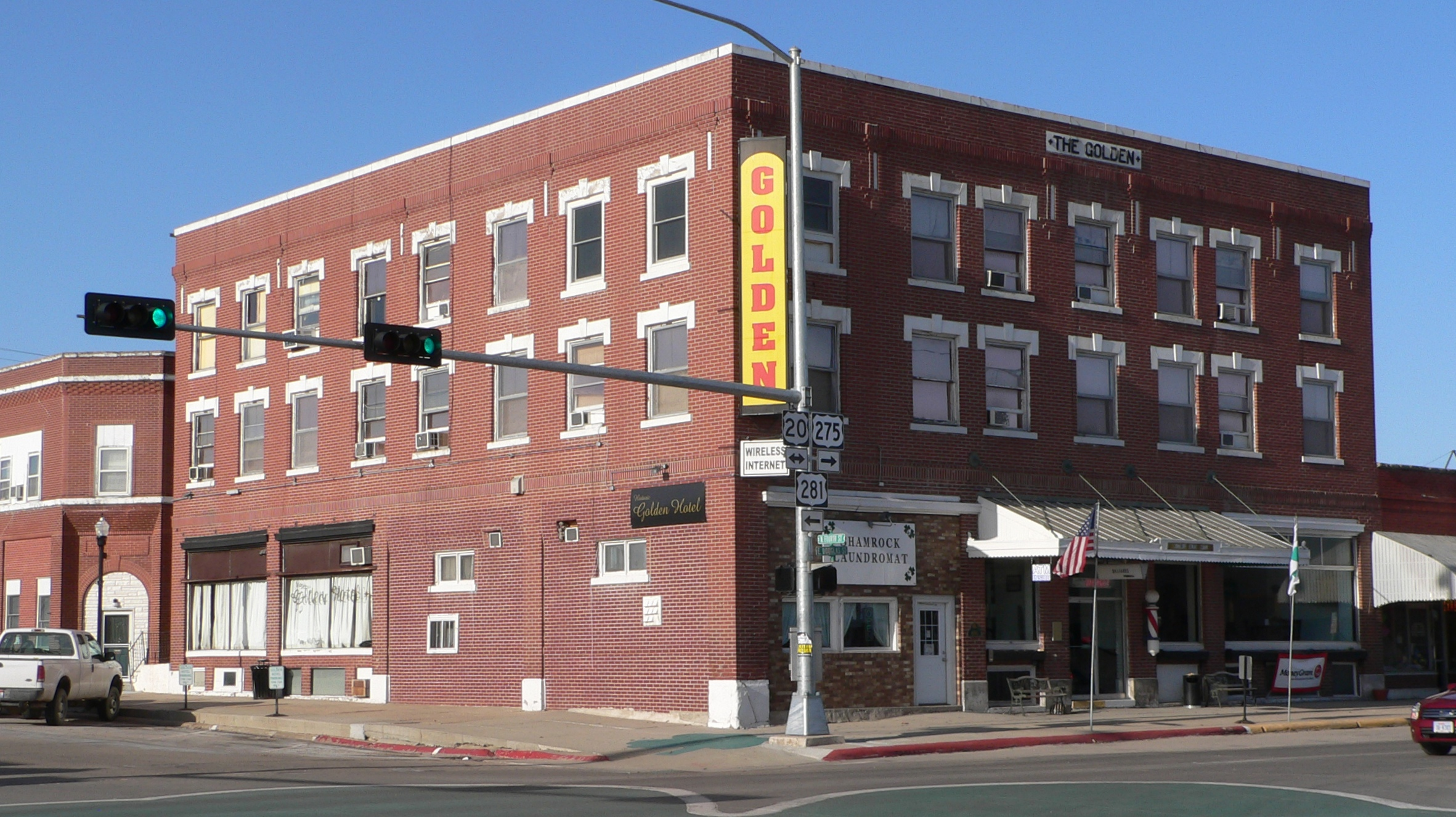

- Location within Nebraska Location within the United States
- Location: 406 E. Douglas St., O'Neill, Nebraska
- Coordinates: 42°27′29″N 98°38′49″W
- Area: less than one acre
- Built: 1912-13
- Built by: Crosby Co.
- Architectural style: Colonial Revival
- NRHP reference No.: 89002040
- Added to NRHP: November 27, 1989

The Golden Hotel, located at 406 E. Douglas St. in O'Neill, Nebraska, is a historic hotel that is listed on the National Register of Historic Places.

== History ==
It was built during 1912–1913 and includes Colonial Revival architecture. The main part of the building was designed and built by the Crosby Company of Kansas City. It was listed on the National Register of Historic Places in 1989, when it was deemed significant on a regional level "for its association with the commercial development of O'Neill and with the building boom of second generation hotels that was occurring on a statewide basis during the first quarter of the twentieth century."

The hotel is known for Chicago gangster Al Capone's stay during the 1920s while visiting his relatives in Nebraska.
