= R.H. Farwell House =

Historic house in Massachusetts, United States

- U.S. National Register of Historic Places
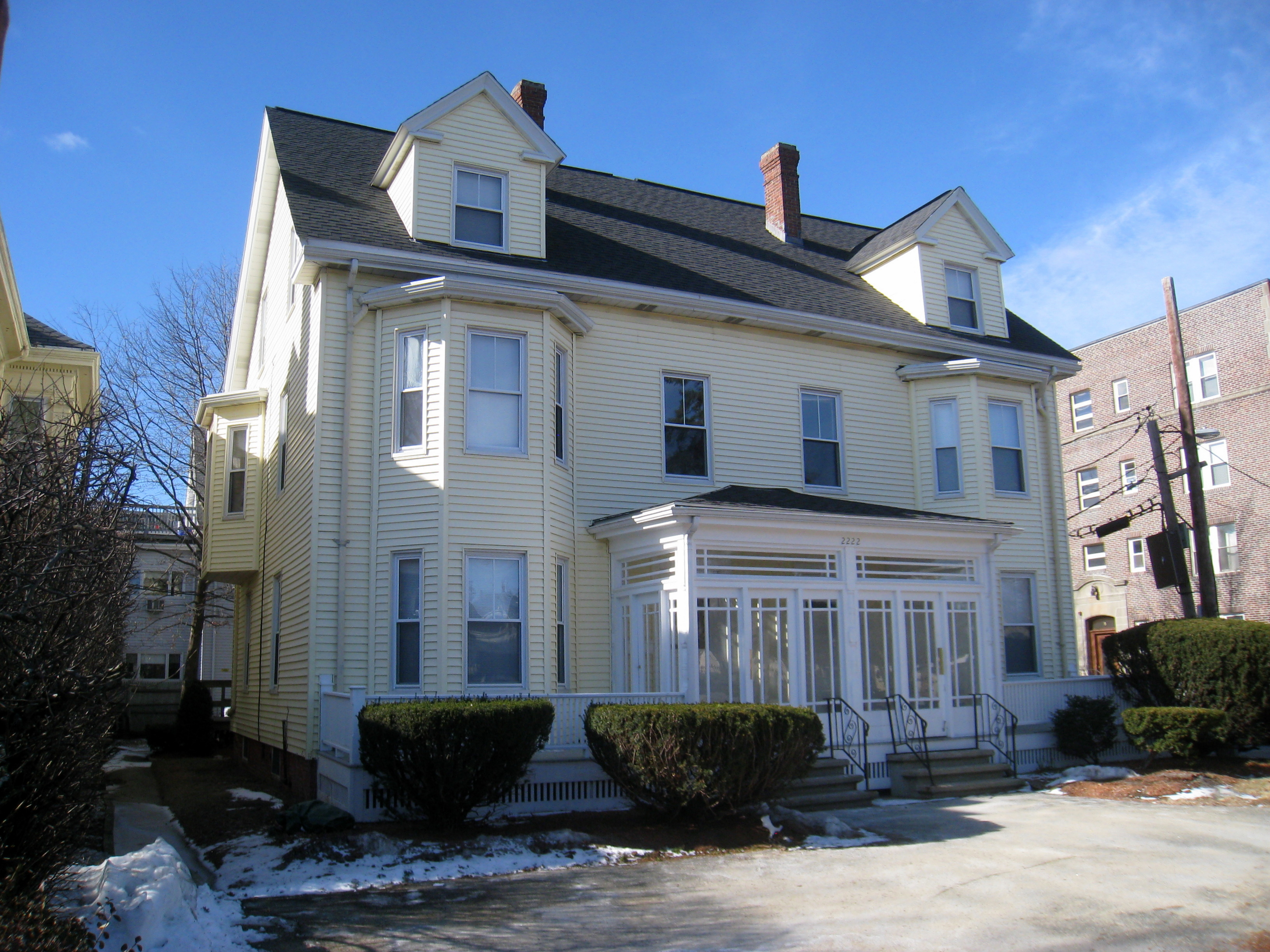

- Location within Massachusetts Location within the United States
- Location: Cambridge, Massachusetts
- Coordinates: 42°23′36.4″N 71°07′34.7″W
- Area: less than one acre
- Built: 1891
- Architect: Durgin, George
- Architectural style: Queen Anne
- MPS: Cambridge MRA
- NRHP reference No.: 82001939
- Added to NRHP: April 13, 1982

The R.H. Farwell House is an historic double house at 2222–2224 Massachusetts Avenue in Cambridge, Massachusetts.

== Description and history ==
The wood-frame house was built in 1891, at a time when what is now Massachusetts Avenue (then North Avenue) was lined with prestigious and fashionable houses. The house has matching center entries under a hip roof, flanked by a pair of two story polygonal bays, which once had brackets in the eaves (since removed). A pair of gabled dormers pierce the roof, space symmetrically near the outer edges.

The house was listed on the National Register of Historic Places in 1982.

== See also ==
- National Register of Historic Places listings in Cambridge, Massachusetts
