= United States Post Office-Valentine =

- U.S. Post Office-Valentine
- U.S. National Register of Historic Places
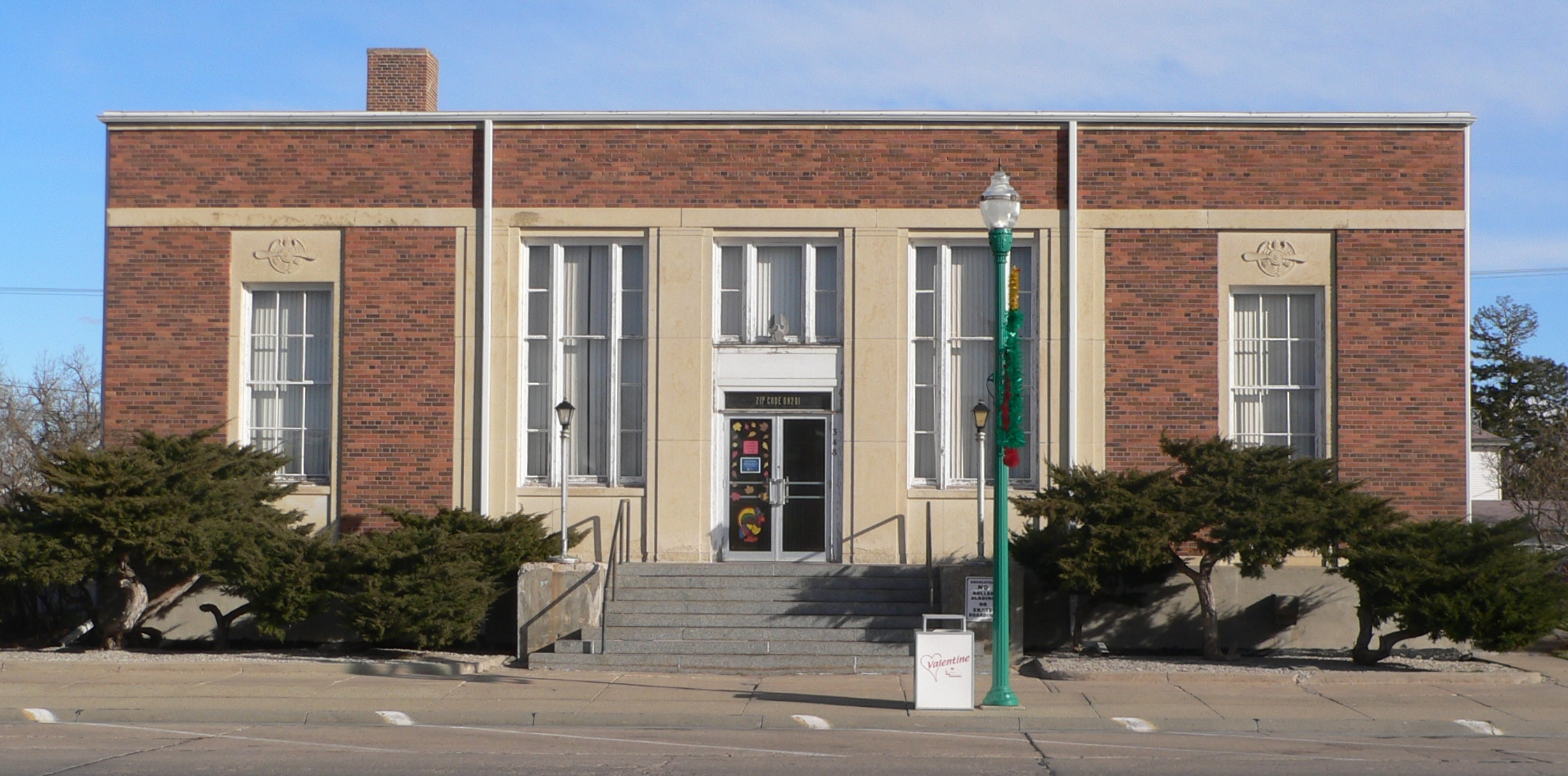

- Location within Nebraska Location within the United States
- Location: 348 N. Main St., Valentine, Nebraska
- Coordinates: 42°52′33″N 100°32′59″W
- Area: less than one acre
- Built: 1939
- Architect: Simon, Louis
- Architectural style: Moderne
- MPS: Nebraska Post Offices Which Contain Section Artwork MPS
- NRHP reference No.: 91001750
- Added to NRHP: December 13, 1991

The U.S. Post Office-Valentine, at 348 N. Main St. in Valentine, Nebraska, was built in 1939. It has also been known as Cherry County Sawer Memorial Library Educational Service Unit 17, Media Center.

It was listed on the National Register of Historic Places in 1991; the listing included one contributing building and two contributing objects. It includes invited artwork by University of Nebraska art professor Kady Faulkner.

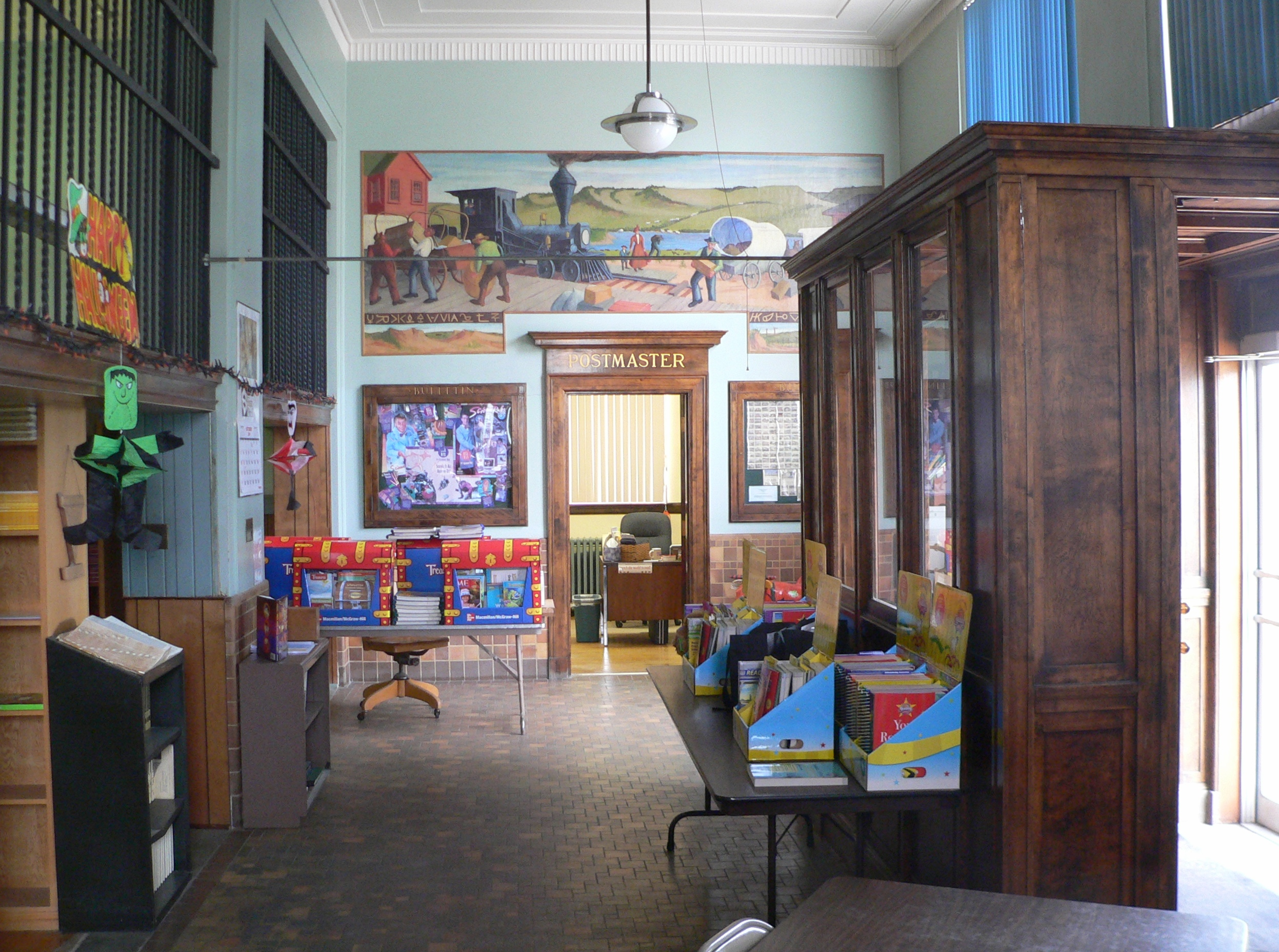
Interior with postmaster's window, and mural above

It is one of 12 Nebraska post offices featuring a Section of Fine Arts mural. The $700 mural in the post office was both praised and panned when it was originally produced. Now the Valentine Media Center, operated by Educational Service Unit #17.
