= United States Post Office (Albion, Nebraska) =

- US Post Office-Albion
- U.S. National Register of Historic Places
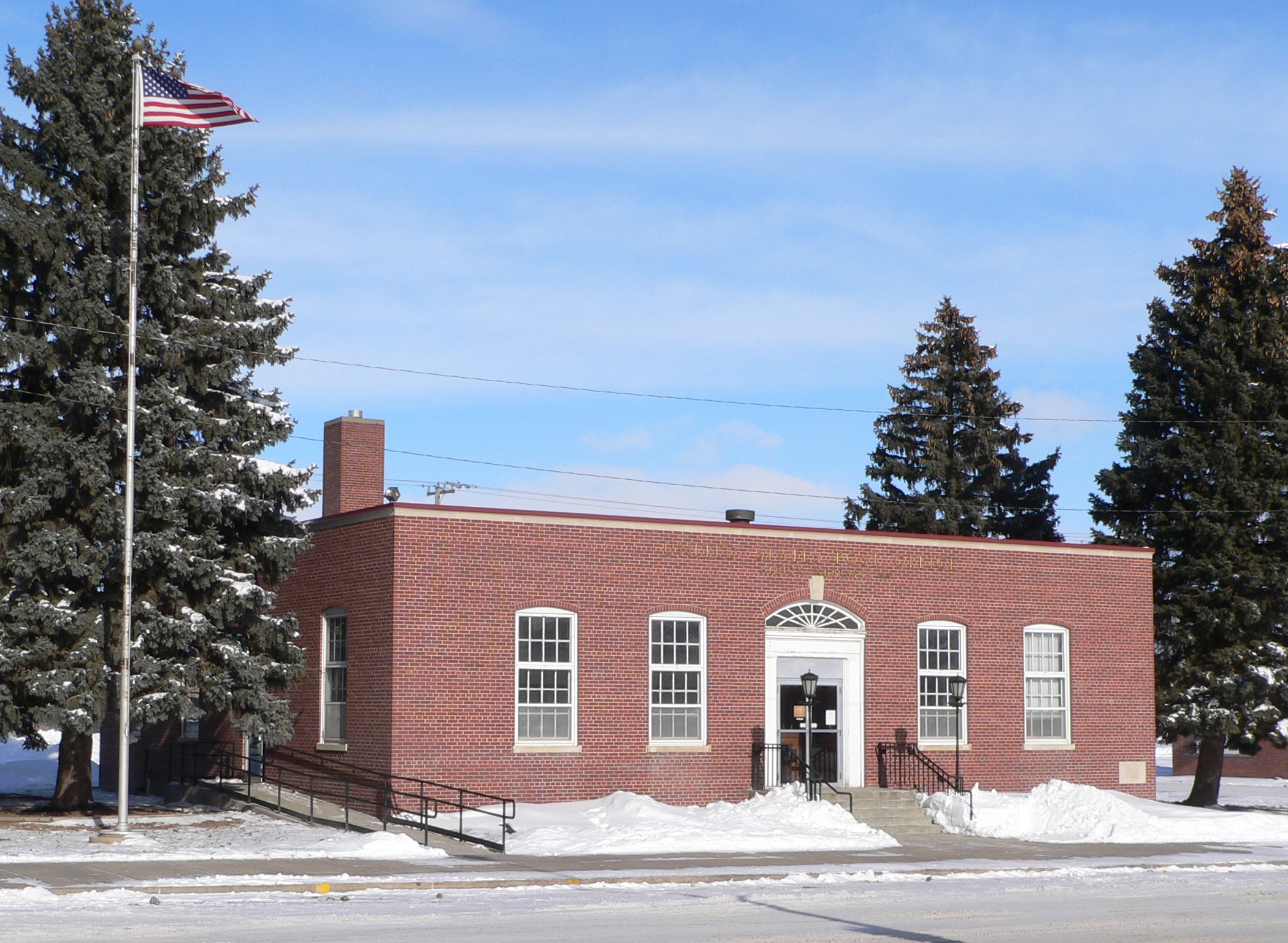

- Location within Nebraska Location within the United States
- Location: 310 W. Church St., Albion, Nebraska
- Coordinates: 41.69212°N 98.000205°W
- Area: less than one acre
- Built: 1939
- Architect: Magafan, Louis; Simon, Louis
- Architectural style: Colonial Revival
- MPS: Nebraska Post Offices Which Contain Section Artwork MPS
- NRHP reference No.: 92000475
- Added to NRHP: May 11, 1992

The Albion United States Post Office, also known as U.S. Post Office-Albion in Albion in Boone County, Nebraska, was built in 1939. It was listed on the National Register of Historic Places in 1992.

This is one of 12 Nebraska post offices featuring a Section of Fine Arts mural, "Nebraska in Winter" (1939) by Jenne Magafan.

It is a one-story brick building with simple Colonial Revival details.
