= Lindsley House (Table Rock, Nebraska) =

- U.S. National Register of Historic Places
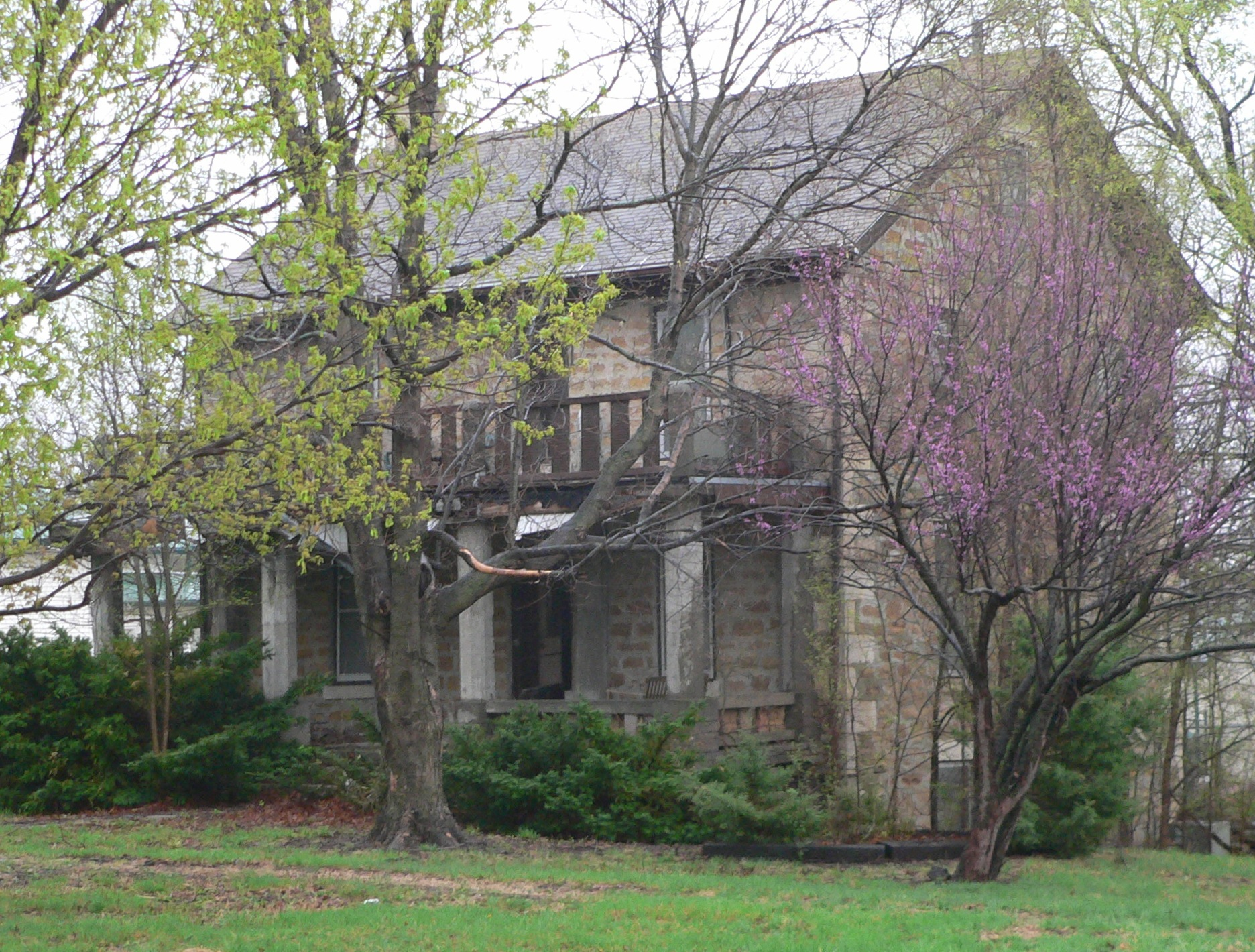
- The house in 2014

- Location within Nebraska Location within the United States
- Location: 706 Luzerne Street, Table Rock, Nebraska
- Coordinates: 40°10′41″N 96°05′50″W
- Area: less than one acre
- Built: 1872
- NRHP reference No.: 99000389
- Added to NRHP: March 25, 1999

The Lindsley House is a historic two-story house in Table Rock, Nebraska. It was built with limestone in 1872 as a hotel run by Mrs Lindsley until 1897. It was later remodelled as a private residence, and the porch was built in 1912. It was remodelled as a bed and breakfast in 1989. The house has been listed on the National Register of Historic Places since March 25, 1999.
