= S.S. Farwell House =

Historic house in Iowa, United States

- U.S. National Register of Historic Places
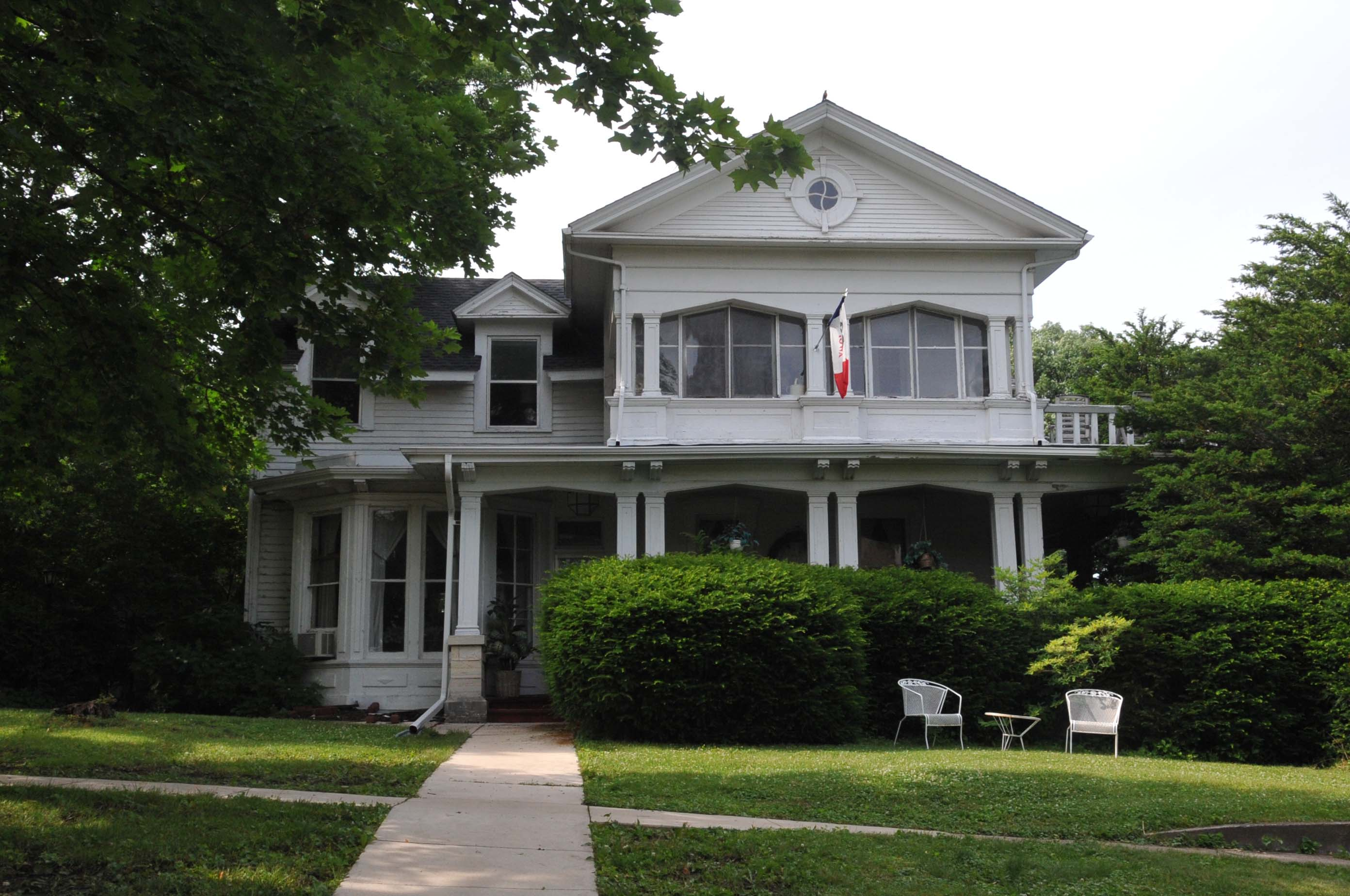

- Location within Iowa Location within the United States
- Interactive map showing the location of Farwell House
- Location: 301 N. Chestnut St. Monticello, Iowa
- Coordinates: 42°14′42.4″N 91°11′35.2″W
- Area: approximately 1 acre (0.40 ha)
- Built: 1867-1868, c. 1909
- Architectural style: Colonial Revival; Italianate
- NRHP reference No.: 79000909
- Added to NRHP: April 27, 1979

The S.S. Farwell House is a historic building located in Monticello, Iowa, United States. Farwell was an Ohio native who settled in Iowa in 1852, and spent of couple years in the late 1850s in Missouri before returning to the Monticello area. He was engaged in farming before the American Civil War, during which he served as a captain in the 31st Iowa Volunteer Infantry Regiment. He saw action at Chickasaw Bayou, Vicksburg, and Missionary Ridge. He mustered out as a major. After the war he served in the Iowa Senate and in various political appointments before becoming a banker. The two-story, frame house was built in two parts. The original Italianate section was completed in 1868, and the Colonial Revival addition with the front porch was added about 1909. The house was listed on the National Register of Historic Places in 1979.
