= Energy charge =

Measure of energy in cells

The adenylate energy charge is an index used to measure the energy status of biological cells.

ATP or Mg-ATP is the principal molecule for storing and transferring energy in the cell : it is used for biosynthetic pathways, maintenance of transmembrane gradients, movement, cell division, etc... More than 90% of the ATP is produced by phosphorylation of ADP by the ATP synthase. ATP can also be produced by "substrate level phosphorylation" reactions (ADP phosphorylation by (1,3)-bisphosphoglycerate, phosphoenolpyruvate, phosphocreatine), by the succinate-CoA ligase and phosphoenolpyruvate carboxylkinase, and by adenylate kinase, an enzyme that maintains the three adenine nucleotides in equilibrium ($\ce{ATP + AMP <=> 2 ADP}$).

The energy charge is related to ATP, ADP and AMP concentrations. It was first defined by Atkinson and Walton who found that it was necessary to take into account the concentration of all three nucleotides, rather than just ATP and ADP, to account for the energy status in metabolism. Since the adenylate kinase maintains two ADP molecules in equilibrium with one ATP ($\ce{2 ADP <=> ATP + AMP}$), Atkinson defined the adenylate energy charge as:

$\mbox{Energy charge} = \frac{[\mbox{ATP}] + \frac{1}{2} [\mbox{ADP}]} {[\mbox{ATP}] + [\mbox{ADP}] + [\mbox{AMP}]}$

The energy charge of most cells varies between 0.7 and 0.95 - oscillations in this range are quite frequent. Daniel Atkinson showed that when the energy charge increases from 0.6 to 1.0, the citrate lyase and phosphoribosyl pyrophosphate synthetase, two enzymes controlling anabolic (ATP-demanding) pathways are activated, while the phosphofructokinase and the pyruvate dehydrogenase, two enzymes controlling amphibolic pathways (supplying ATP as well as important biosynthetic intermediates) are inhibited He concluded that control of these pathways has evolved to maintain the energy charge within rather narrow limits - in other words, that the energy charge, like the pH of a cell, must be buffered at all times. We now know that most if not all anabolic and catabolic pathways are indeed controlled, directly and indirectly, by the energy charge. In addition to direct regulation of several enzymes by adenyl nucleotides, an AMP-activated protein kinase known as AMP-K phosphorylates and thereby regulates key enzymes when the energy charge decreases. This results in switching off anabolic pathways while switching on catabolic pathways when AMP increases.

Life depends on an adequate energy charge. If ATP synthesis is momentarily insufficient to maintain an adequate energy charge, AMP can be converted by two different pathways to hypoxanthine and ribose-5P, followed by irreversible oxidation of hypoxanthine to uric acid. This helps to buffer the adenylate energy charge by decreasing the total {ATP+ADP+AMP} concentration.
