= Daniel Atkinson (biochemist) =

American biochemist (1921–2024)

Daniel Edward Atkinson
- Born: April 8, 1921; Pawnee City, Nebraska, U.S.
- Died: February 2, 2024 (aged 102); Corvallis, Oregon, U.S.
- Education: University of Nebraska, Iowa State University (Ph.D.)
- Known for: Energy charge
- Scientific career
- Fields: Biochemistry, especially metabolic regulation
- Institutions: California Institute of Technology, Argonne National Laboratories, University of California, Los Angeles

Daniel Edward Atkinson (April 8, 1921 – February 2, 2024) was an American biochemist who worked at UCLA for 40 years from 1952 until his retirement in 1992, though he continued his scientific work as Emeritus Professor. He is best known for the concept of energy charge.

== Education ==
Atkinson was an undergraduate at the University of Nebraska, and obtained a Ph.D. at Iowa State University, where he investigated the synthesis of aromatic amino acids and effects of p-fluorophenylalanine in Lactobacillus arabinosus, under the supervision of Sidney Fox.

== Career ==
After a post-doctoral period at the California Institute of Technology, followed by one as a research scientist at Argonne National laboratories, Atkinson moved to UCLA in 1952 as the second biochemist in the department. In his first work at UCLA he studied the bacterium Hydrogenomonas facilis, beginning with a description of the purification of hydrogenase.

Atkinson remained at UCLA for the remainder of his career, where he undertook numerous studies of metabolic regulation. Of these the best known is his introduction of the concept of energy charge.

== Energy charge ==
Atkinson and Walton introduced the concept of energy charge, later discussed more fully, as a way to rationalize the dependence of metabolic processes on the proportions of the adenylates. For pairs of metabolites, such as the reduced and oxidized forms of NAD, a straightforward ratio of concentrations is sufficient, but the case of the adenylates is more complicated, as there are three components to be considered, AMP, ADP and ATP.

The three adenylates are related by the reaction catalysed by adenylate kinase:

$$\ce{ATP + AMP <=> 2 ADP}$$

and on the basis of this equation Atkinson proposed the following ratio as a measure of the metabolic state of a cell:

$$\mathrm{Energy} \text{ } \mathrm{charge} = \frac{[\mathrm{ATP}] + 0.5[\mathrm{ADP}]}{[\mathrm{ATP}] + [\mathrm{ADP}] + [\mathrm{AMP}]}$$

== Metabolic regulation ==
Atkinson's work on the energy charge was part of a broader interest in metabolic regulation and its mechanisms, and he contributed numerous influential publications in this field. In addition to general articles on metabolic regulation he also worked on specific enzymes, such as isocitrate dehydrogenase and glutaminase, and on the role of urea synthesis in vertebrates.

== Cellular Energy Metabolism and its Regulation ==
Atkinson's influential book on energy metabolism set out the concepts and understanding of metabolic regulation that had developed over the preceding decades (most notably by him), in particular explaining the role of ratios of metabolite concentrations, including the energy charge, in regulating enzyme properties.

== Later life and death ==
Atkinson spent his last years living in Corvallis, Oregon. He died on February 2, 2024, at the age of 102.
