= Du Bois, Nebraska =

- Village
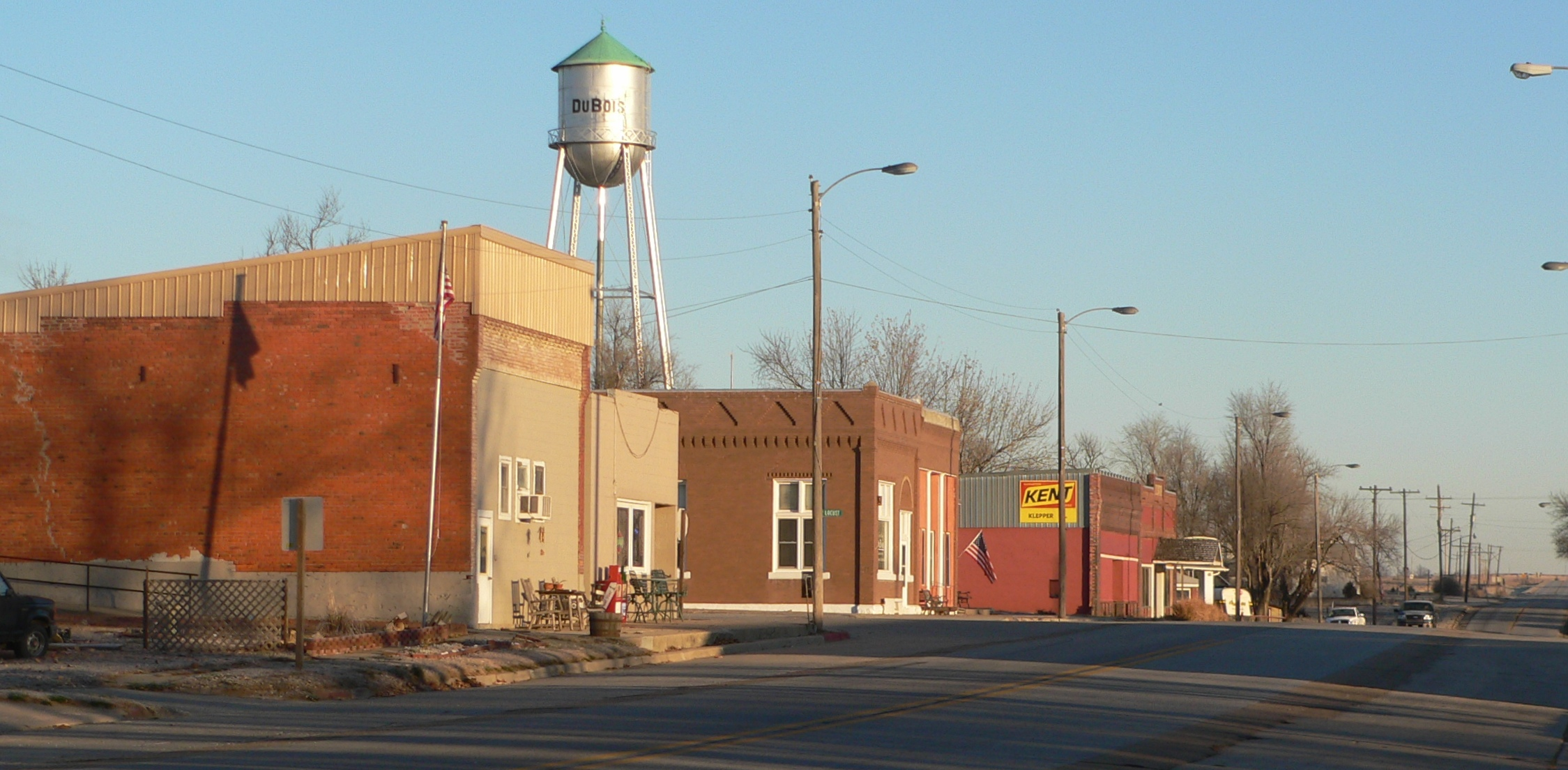
- Downtown DuBois

- Location of Du Bois, Nebraska
- Coordinates: 40°02′04″N 96°02′48″W
- Country: United States
- State: Nebraska
- County: Pawnee

Area
  - Total: 0.46 sq mi (1.18 km^{2})
  - Land: 0.46 sq mi (1.18 km^{2})
  - Water: 0 sq mi (0.00 km^{2})
- Elevation: 1,050 ft (320 m)

Population (2020)
  - Total: 124
  - Estimate (2021): 124
  - Density: 272/sq mi (105/km^{2})
- Time zone: UTC-6 (Central (CST))
  - Summer (DST): UTC-5 (CDT)
- ZIP code: 68345
- Area code: 402
- FIPS code: 31-13750
- GNIS feature ID: 2398751

Du Bois (/duːˈbɔɪz/ doo-BOYZ) is a village in the southeast corner of Pawnee County, Nebraska, United States. The population was 124 at the 2020 census.

== History ==
Du Bois was platted in 1886 when the railroad was extended to that point. It was named for Captain Charles J. DuBois, a railroad official.

== Geography ==
According to the United States Census Bureau, the village has a total area of 0.45 square miles (1.17 km^{2}), all land.

== Demographics ==
Historical population
Census	Pop.	Note	%±
1890	316		—
1900	307		−2.8%
1910	339		10.4%
1920	332		−2.1%
1930	350		5.4%
1940	315		−10.0%
1950	236		−25.1%
1960	218		−7.6%
1970	185		−15.1%
1980	178		−3.8%
1990	119		−33.1%
2000	166		39.5%
2010	147		−11.4%
2020	122		−17.0%
2021 (est.)	124	▲	1.6%
U.S. Decennial Census

=== 2010 census ===
As of the census of 2010, there were 147 people, 66 households, and 39 families residing in the village. The population density was 326.7 inhabitants per square mile (126.1/km^{2}). There were 84 housing units at an average density of 186.7 per square mile (72.1/km^{2}). The racial makeup of the village was 92.5% White, 4.1% from other races, and 3.4% from two or more races. Hispanic or Latino of any race were 4.1% of the population.

There were 66 households, of which 25.8% had children under the age of 18 living with them, 51.5% were married couples living together, 3.0% had a female householder with no husband present, 4.5% had a male householder with no wife present, and 40.9% were non-families. 34.8% of all households were made up of individuals, and 18.2% had someone living alone who was 65 years of age or older. The average household size was 2.23 and the average family size was 2.92.

The median age in the village was 49.2 years. 21.8% of residents were under the age of 18; 2.6% were between the ages of 18 and 24; 19.7% were from 25 to 44; 29.9% were from 45 to 64; and 25.9% were 65 years of age or older. The gender makeup of the village was 53.7% male and 46.3% female.

=== 2000 census ===
As of the census of 2000, there were 166 people, 76 households, and 44 families residing in the village. The population density was 364.1 inhabitants per square mile (140.6/km^{2}). There were 87 housing units at an average density of 190.8 per square mile (73.7/km^{2}). The racial makeup of the village was 98.19% White, and 1.81% from two or more races.

There were 76 households, out of which 21.1% had children under the age of 18 living with them, 50.0% were married couples living together, 5.3% had a female householder with no husband present, and 42.1% were non-families. 35.5% of all households were made up of individuals, and 22.4% had someone living alone who was 65 years of age or older. The average household size was 2.18 and the average family size was 2.89.

In the village, the population was spread out, with 22.3% under the age of 18, 2.4% from 18 to 24, 24.1% from 25 to 44, 26.5% from 45 to 64, and 24.7% who were 65 years of age or older. The median age was 48 years. For every 100 females, there were 97.6 males. For every 100 females age 18 and over, there were 98.5 males.

As of 2000 the median income for a household in the village was $26,250, and the median income for a family was $33,125. Males had a median income of $23,000 versus $14,375 for females. The per capita income for the village was $10,335. About 6.1% of families and 11.3% of the population were below the poverty line, including 11.8% of those under the age of eighteen and 25.9% of those 65 or over.
