= United States Post Office (O'Neill, Nebraska) =

- US Post Office--O'Neill
- U.S. National Register of Historic Places
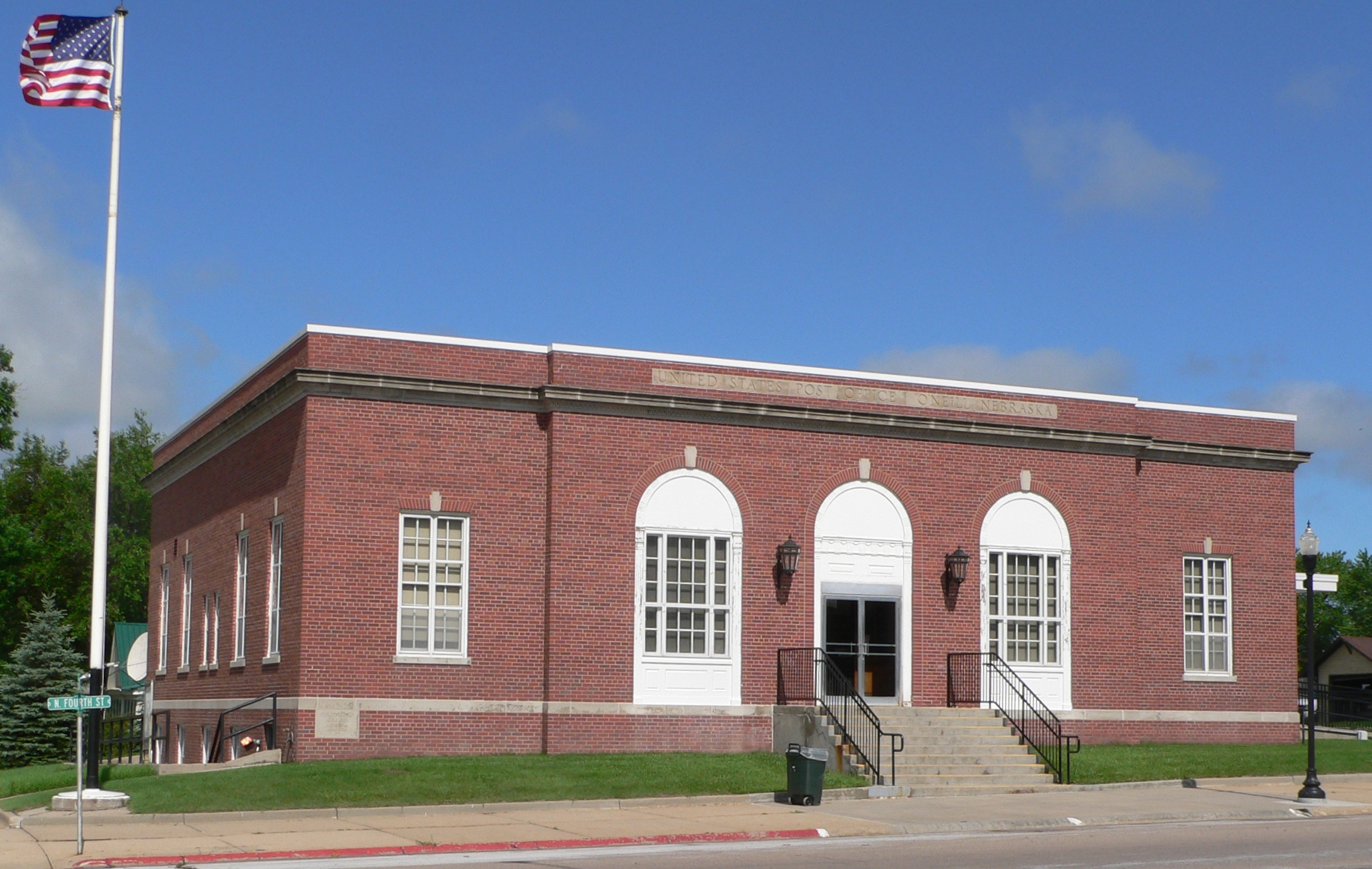

- Location within Nebraska Location within the United States
- Location: 204 N. 4th St., O'Neill, Nebraska
- Coordinates: 42°27′33″N 98°38′52″W
- Area: less than one acre
- Built: 1936-1937
- Architect: Louis A. Simon, Neal A. Melick
- Builder: J. H. Merchbank
- Architectural style: Georgian Revival
- MPS: Nebraska Post Offices Which Contain Section Artwork MPS
- NRHP reference No.: 92000479
- Added to NRHP: May 11, 1992

The O'Neill United States Post Office was built in 1936 and 1937 in O'Neill, Nebraska. Louis A. Simon was the supervising architect for this one-story Georgian Revival style building, built from standardized plans. The building houses a New Deal mural by Eugene Trentham. It was listed on the National Register of Historic Places in 1992 as US Post Office--O'Neill..

== History ==
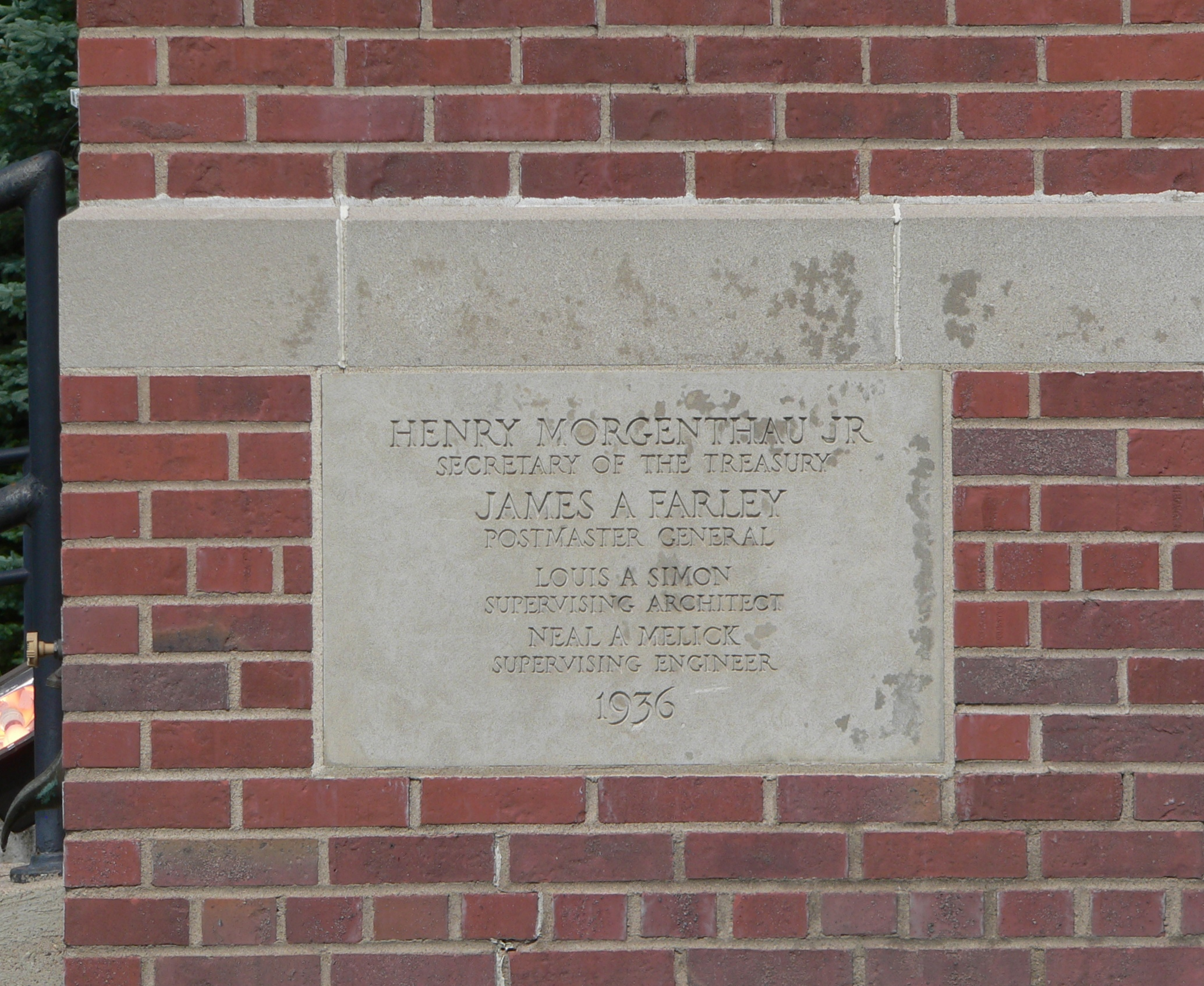
Corner stone of O'Neil Post Office.

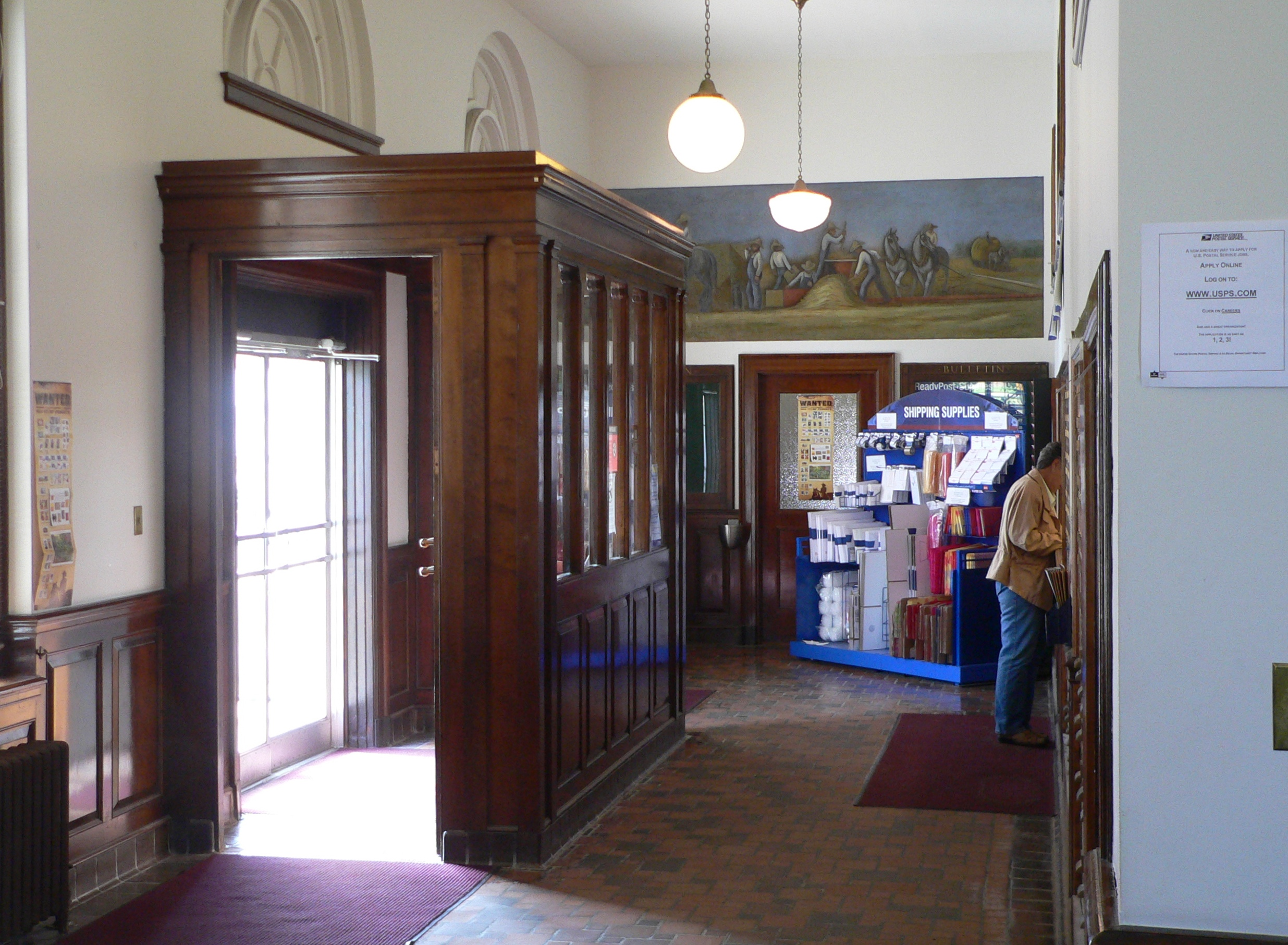
O'Neil Post Office lobby, with mural over the doorway, to rear

The O'Neill United States Post office is located on the corner of 4th and Clay Streets in O'Neill, Nebraska. It was built in summer of 1936 through the fall of 1937 for the United States Treasury Department. The building was constructed by J. H. Merchbank.

The post office was listed on the National Register of Historic Places on May 11, 1992 as US Post Office--O'Neill.

== Architecture ==
Louis A. Simon was the supervising architect and Neal A. Melick was the supervising engineer for the O'Neill United States Post Office. It is a one-story Georgian Revival style building built in red brick from standard plans. The front has five bays, with the central three rounded arches with keystones. It has a carved stone plaque that states, "United States Post Office O'Neill, Nebraska". Inside the post office is a lobby with its original ceramic tile floor, lightfixtures, wainscotting, and woodwork.

== Art ==
The O'Neill United States Post Office is one of twelve Nebraska post offices featuring a Section of Fine Arts mural. It houses the oil on canvas mural, "Baling Hay in Holt County in the Early Days" by Eugene Trentham. Trentham completed the mural in May 1938. The mural is eleven feet by four feet, and is located on the south wall of the lobby. It shows men baling hay with a baling machine that is powered by horses. The mural was cleaned and restored in 1981.
