= Pawnee City, Nebraska =

City in and county seat of Pawnee County, Nebraska, United States

- City
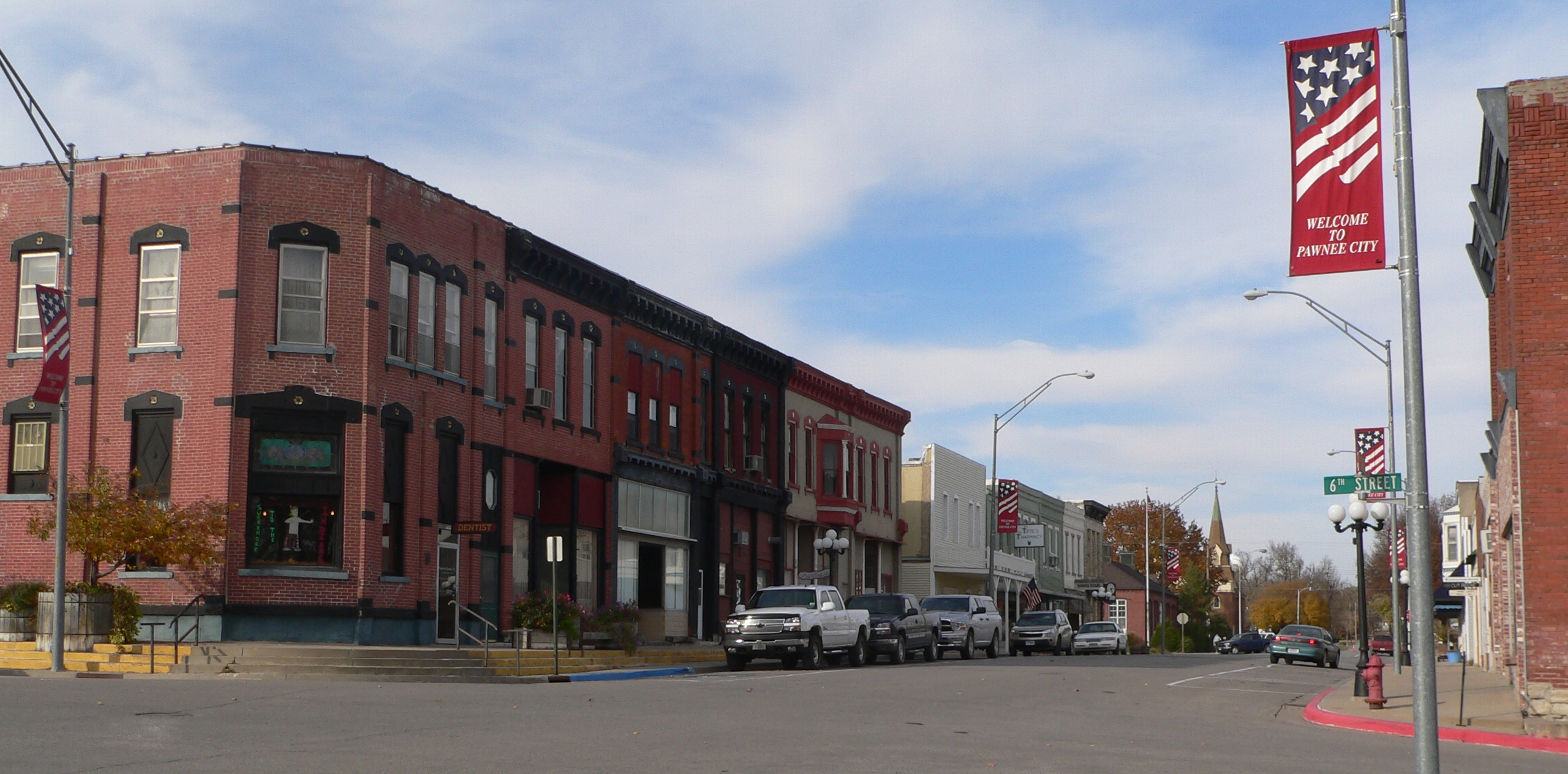
- West side of G Street, looking NW from 6th St, 2010

- Location of Pawnee City, Nebraska
- Coordinates: 40°06′38″N 96°09′11″W
- Country: United States
- State: Nebraska
- County: Pawnee
- Incorporated: 1858

Area
  - Total: 1.20 sq mi (3.12 km^{2})
  - Land: 1.20 sq mi (3.12 km^{2})
  - Water: 0 sq mi (0.00 km^{2})
- Elevation: 1,198 ft (365 m)

Population (2020)
  - Total: 865
  - Density: 718/sq mi (277.2/km^{2})
- Time zone: UTC-6 (Central (CST))
  - Summer (DST): UTC-5 (CDT)
- ZIP code: 68420
- Area code: 402
- FIPS code: 31-38575
- GNIS feature ID: 2396164
- Website: pawneecitynebraska.com

Pawnee City is a city in and the county seat of Pawnee County, Nebraska, United States. As of the 2020 census, Pawnee City had a population of 865.

== History ==
The site of present-day Pawnee City was designated as the county seat on November 4, 1856, and the townsite was platted in the spring of 1857. Pawnee City was incorporated in 1858, and is named after the Pawnee Native Americans.

By the 1880s, Pawnee City was a railroad town at the junction of two railroad lines. On August 9, 1881, two-thirds of downtown Pawnee City was destroyed by a fire. Downtown was subsequently rebuilt with fireproof construction.

== Geography ==
According to the United States Census Bureau, the city has a total area of 1.21 square miles (3.13 km^{2}), all land.

== Demographics ==
Historical population
Census	Pop.	Note	%±
1880	763		—
1890	1,550		103.1%
1900	1,969		27.0%
1910	1,610		−18.2%
1920	1,595		−0.9%
1930	1,573		−1.4%
1940	1,647		4.7%
1950	1,606		−2.5%
1960	1,343		−16.4%
1970	1,267		−5.7%
1980	1,156		−8.8%
1990	1,008		−12.8%
2000	1,033		2.5%
2010	878		−15.0%
2020	865		−1.5%
U.S. Decennial Census

=== 2010 census ===
At the 2010 census there were 878 people, 425 households, and 210 families living in the city. The population density was 725.6 inhabitants per square mile (280.2/km^{2}). There were 518 housing units at an average density of 428.1 units per square mile (165.3 units/km^{2}). The racial makeup of the city was 96.9% White, 0.2% African American, 0.3% Native American, 0.2% Asian, 0.3% from other races, and 1.9% from two or more races. Hispanic or Latino of any race were 2.1%.

Of the 425 households 19.1% had children under the age of 18 living with them, 39.3% were married couples living together, 7.5% had a female householder with no husband present, 2.6% had a male householder with no wife present, and 50.6% were non-families. 45.6% of households were one person and 25.4% were one person aged 65 or older. The average household size was 1.97 and the average family size was 2.79.

The median age was 52.9 years. 18.7% of residents were under the age of 18; 5.3% were between the ages of 18 and 24; 15.7% were from 25 to 44; 28.5% were from 45 to 64; and 31.8% were 65 or older. The gender makeup of the city was 47.2% male and 52.8% female.

=== 2000 census ===
At the 2000 census there were 1,033 people, 474 households, and 264 families living in the city. The population density was 881.9 inhabitants per square mile (340.5/km^{2}). There were 542 housing units at an average density of 462.7 units per square mile (178.6 units/km^{2}). The racial makeup of the city was 99.13% White, 0.19% Native American, 0.10% Asian, and 0.58% from two or more races. Hispanic or Latino of any race were 0.68%.

Of the 474 households 22.4% had children under the age of 18 living with them, 47.3% were married couples living together, 7.2% had a female householder with no husband present, and 44.3% were non-families. 42.2% of households were one person and 27.8% were one person aged 65 or older. The average household size was 2.07 and the average family size was 2.79.

The age distribution was 20.7% under the age of 18, 4.3% from 18 to 24, 19.4% from 25 to 44, 20.5% from 45 to 64, and 35.1% 65 or older. The median age was 50 years. For every 100 females, there were 75.7 males. For every 100 females age 18 and over, there were 72.4 males.

The median household income was $23,587, and the median family income was $32,717. Males had a median income of $25,489 versus $18,500 for females. The per capita income for the city was $17,386. About 8.3% of families and 14.3% of the population were below the poverty line, including 12.7% of those under age 18 and 16.0% of those age 65 or over.

== Notable people ==
See also List of people from Pawnee County, Nebraska

- Daniel Atkinson (1921–2024), biochemist at UCLA
- David Butler, first governor of Nebraska (1867–1871)
- Lavon Heidemann, lieutenant governor of Nebraska
- Larry the Cable Guy, comedian
- Irish McCalla, actress
- Kenneth S. Wherry, mayor, U.S. Senator from Nebraska 1943–51; Senate Republican Leader

== See also ==
- List of municipalities in Nebraska
- National Register of Historic Places listings in Pawnee County, Nebraska
