= List of museums in Nebraska =

This list of museums in Nebraska encompasses museums in the state, which are defined for this context as institutions (including nonprofit organizations, government entities, and private businesses) that collect and care for objects of cultural, artistic, scientific, or historical interest and make their collections or related exhibits available for public viewing. Museums that exist only in cyberspace (i.e., virtual museums) are not included.

== Museums ==
Name	Town/City	County	Region	Type	Summary
100th Meridian Museum	Cozad	Dawson	Central	Local history	
Adams House and Cook Blacksmith Shop	Ponca	Dixon	Northeast	Local history	Operated by the Ponca Historical Society, early 20th-century period house and restored blacksmith shop
Agate Fossil Beds National Monument	Harrison	Sioux	Nebraska Panhandle	Natural history	Includes fossils and Native American artifacts
American Historical Society of Germans From Russia Cultural Heritage Research Center	Lincoln	Lancaster	Eastern	Open air	website, includes chapel, summer kitchen, barn, general store and blacksmith shop
Angel De Cora Museum and Research Center	Winnebago	Thurston	Northeast	Native American	Facebook site, History and culture of the Winnebago Tribe of Nebraska, includes photos, artwork, arrowheads, beadwork, and musical instruments
Anna Bemis Palmer Museum	York	York	Central	Local history	Located in the York Community Center, includes period rooms and businesses, geology, Native Americans, pioneer days, military and local disasters
Antelope County Museum	Neligh	Antelope	Eastern	Local history	website, operated by the Antelope County Historical Society, features the main museum, a reproduction log cabin and the Pioneer Church
Arbor Day Farm	Nebraska City	Otoe	Southeast	Natural history	website, family nature discovery center with focus on trees
Arbor Lodge State Historical Park and Arboretum	Nebraska City	Otoe	Southeast	Multiple	Features historic mansion, carriage house with various vehicles, log cabin, arboretum and trails
Ashfall Fossil Beds State Historical Park	Royal	Antelope	Western	Natural history	Operated by the University of Nebraska State Museum, visitor center for ongoing fossil excavations
Bank of Florence Museum	Omaha	Douglas	Eastern	Historic site	Restored pioneer bank with vault and manager's quarters
Banner County Museum	Harrisburg	Banner	Nebraska Panhandle	Open air	Facebook site, includes period rooms, weapons, household items and personal collections, machine shed, sod and log houses, church, general store, schoolhouse, drug store, barn, service station, bank, operated by the Banner County Historical Society
Bartels Museum	Seward	Seward	Southeast	Natural history	Located in the lower level of Link Library of Concordia University, minerals, agate, fossils and rocks
Bayard Chimney Rock Museum	Bayard	Morrill	Nebraska Panhandle	Local history	information, located in a historic railroad depot
Bemis Center for Contemporary Arts	Omaha	Douglas	Eastern	Art	Features 3 main galleries with over 20 exhibitions yearly in all media, including video, installation and performance art
Bess Streeter Aldrich Home and Museum	Elmwood	Cass	Southeast	Biographical	website, two nearby sites, one the 1922-1946 period home and the other a museum with memorabilia of author Bess Streeter Aldrich
Bone Creek Museum of Agrarian Art	David City	Butler	Southeast	Art	website, art about agriculture
Boneyard Creation Museum	Broken Bow	Custer	Sandhills	Religious	website, Creationist museum
Boone County Historical Society Museum	Albion	Boone	Northeast	Local history	website
Boys Town	Omaha	Douglas	Eastern	Historic site	Includes history hall of the non-profit organization for children and families, restored home of Father Flanagan, stamp museum
Bowring Ranch State Historical Park	Merriman	Cherry	Sandhills	Historic house	Historic working ranch with period home, sod house and visitor center about Eva Bowring, Nebraska's first woman Senator
Brown County Historical Society Museum	Ainsworth	Brown	Sandhills	Local history	Includes the Coleman House, Dixon House and old gas station with antique collections, clothing
Buffalo Bill Ranch State Historical Park	North Platte	Lincoln	Central	Biographical	Also known as Scout's Rest, home and museum about Buffalo Bill Cody
Burt County Museum	Tekamah	Burt	Eastern	Local history	website, includes two houses with local history and period displays and a one-room schoolhouse
Butler County Historical Society Museum	David City	Butler	Southeast	Local, Railroad & Military	https://www.butlernemuseum.com/
Butte Community Historical Center and Museum	Butte	Boyd	Central	Local history	
Cairo Roots Museum	Cairo	Hall	Central	Local history	website, located inside the Cairo Community Center
Cambridge Museum	Cambridge	Furnas	Southwest	Local history	
Captain Bailey House	Brownville	Nemaha	Southeast	Historic house	website, 19th-century period house, operated by the Brownville Historical Society
Carnegie Arts Center	Alliance	Box Butte	Nebraska Panhandle	Art	website, community arts center
Carson House	Brownville	Nemaha	Southeast	Historic house	website, 19th-century period house, operated by the Brownville Historical Society
Cass County Historical Society Museum	Plattsmouth	Cass	Southeast	Local history	website, exhibits include steamboats, pioneer life, trains, farms, automobiles, telephone and radio, churches and religious life, schools, entertainment, period rooms
Cedar County Historical Museum	Hartington	Cedar	Northeast	Open air	information, includes log cabin, 1900 house, carriage house and exhibit hall with antique machinery and vehicles
Centennial Hall Museum	Valentine	Cherry	Sandhills	Local history	Includes a collection of bells
Champion Mill Park	Champion	Chase	Southwest	Mill	Late 19th-century water-powered mill
Chase County Historical Society Museum	Champion	Chase	Southwest	Local history	information
Cherry County Historical Society Museum	Valentine	Cherry	Sandhills	Local history	information
Children's Museum of Central Nebraska	Hastings	Adams	Central	Children's	website
Chimney Rock National Historic Site	Bayard	Morrill	Nebraska Panhandle	History	Operated by the Nebraska State Historical Society, includes exhibits about pioneers and the migrations in the West
Civil War Veterans Museum at the G.A.R. Memorial Hall	Nebraska City	Otoe	Southeast	Civil War	
Classic Car Collection	Kearney	Buffalo	Central	Automobile	website
Clay County Museum	Clay Center	Clay	Central	Local history	Operated by the Clay County Historical Society
Cody Park Railroad Museum	North Platte	Lincoln	Western	Railroad	information, includes Union Pacific 3977 steam and Union Pacific 6922 diesel locomotives, restored railroad depot, several rail cars and a caboose
Cornelius O'Connor House	Homer	Dakota	Northeast	Historic house	Operated by the Dakota County Historical Society
Corps of Discovery Welcome Center	Crofton	Knox	Northeast	Multiple	View of Gavins Point Dam, geology, exploration, early navigation, settlement and natural history of the Missouri River region, dam construction, website
Crawford Historical Museum	Crawford	Dawes	Nebraska Panhandle	Local history	website, operated by Crawford Historical Society
Creighton Historical Center	Creighton	Knox		Local history	website
Cuming County Historical Museum	West Point	Cuming	Northeast	Open air	Includes 6 restored buildings, operated by the Cuming County Historical Society, open during the Cuming County Fair and at any time by request
Custer County Historical Society Museum	Broken Bow	Custer	Sandhills	Local history	website, includes 19th-century general store and early 20th-century drug store displays
Czechoslovak Museum	Omaha	Douglas	Eastern	Ethnic	Histories of Czechs and Slovaks, open by appointment
Dawes County Historical Museum	Chadron	Dawes	Nebraska Panhandle	Open air	information, includes museum with displays of a general store, hospital room, blacksmith tools, farm machinery, vintage quilts, railroad room and household items, and grounds include a log house and barn, 1890s schoolhouse, pioneer church and caboose
Dawson County Historical Museum	Lexington	Dawson	Central	Multiple	website, local history and art, schoolhouse with agriculture displays, fire truck
Decatur Museum	Decatur	Burt	Northeast	Local History	Operated by the Decatur Historical Committee
Didier Log Cabin	Brownville	Nemaha	Southeast	Historic house	website, 1854 log cabin, operated by the Brownville Historical Society
Diller Bank Building Museum	Diller	Jefferson	Southeast	Local history	Operated by the Jefferson County Historical Society
District 10 School	Fairbury	Jefferson	Southeast	School	Operated by the Jefferson County Historical Society
Dixon County Museum	Allen	Dixon	Northeast	Local history	Includes local history museum, schoolhouse, railroad building and agriculture machinery building, operated by the Dixon County Historical Society
Dobby's Frontier Town	Alliance	Box Butte	Nebraska Panhandle	Open air	website, includes general store, post office, original bootlegger's cabin, baled straw house, bank, saloon, stable, Chinese laundry, gas station
Dowse Sod House	Comstock	Custer	Sandhills	Historic house	Early 20th-century sod house
Dr. Spurgin's Dental Office	Brownville	Nemaha	Southeast	Historic house	website, features antique dental tools and equipment, operated by the Brownville Historical Society
Durham Museum	Omaha	Douglas	Eastern	History	Formerly known as Durham Western Heritage Museum, history of the United States' western region
Edgerton Explorit Center	Aurora	Hamilton	Central	Science	website, hands-on science exhibits
Eisentrager Howard Gallery	Lincoln	Lancaster	Eastern	Art	Part of University of Nebraska–Lincoln, located on the first floor of Richards Hall, exhibits the work of UNL faculty and students
El Museo Latino	Omaha	Douglas	Eastern	Ethnic	Latino and Hispanic art and history
Eleanor Barbour Cook Museum of Geology	Chadron	Dawes	Nebraska Panhandle	Natural history	website, part of Chadron State College, fossils, rocks, minerals
Elkhorn Valley Museum and Research Center	Norfolk	Madison	Northeast	Local history	Hosts a Johnny Carson exhibit, period displays, changing exhibits and a children's discovery center. Home of the Nebraska Music Hall of Fame.
Elmwood G.A.R. Hall Veterans Museum	Elmwood	Cass	Southeast	Military	
Fairbury City Museum	Fairbury	Jefferson	Southeast	Local history	information
Fillmore County Museum	Fairmont	Fillmore	Southeast	Local history	
Florence Depot	Omaha	Douglas	Eastern	Railroad	Located in the Florence community
Florence Mill	Omaha	Douglas	Eastern	Local history	Restored flour mill features the Winter Quarters Mill Museum with pioneer history and the ArtLoft Gallery, located in the Florence community
Fort Atkinson State Historical Park	Fort Calhoun	Washington	Eastern	Military	Restored fort with periodic living history demonstrations
Fort Cody Trading Post	North Platte	Lincoln	Western	History	website, store that includes the Buffalo Bill's Miniature Wild West Show, a hand-carved miniature show display, and the Museum of the Old West with weapons, clothing, artifacts and natural history displays
Fort Hartsuff State Historical Park	Burwell	Garfield	Sandhills	Military	Restored fort with seasonal weekend living history demonstrations
Fort Kearny State Historical Park	Kearney	Kearney	Central	Military	Recreated stockade and exhibits about the Oregon Trail
Fort Robinson Museum	Crawford	Dawes	Nebraska Panhandle	Military	Operated by the Nebraska State Historical Society
Fort Sidney Complex	Sidney	Cheyenne	Nebraska Panhandle	Military	Includes the powder house, married officer's quarters which houses the Cheyenne County Museum, and the late 19th-century period Post Commander's home
Franklin County Museum	Franklin	Franklin	Central	Local history	Exhibits include pioneers, Native Americans, military, local citizens, farming, school house and Ol' Towne which replicates an old West township
Freedom Park	Omaha	Douglas	Eastern	Military	Outdoor park with military museum ships and aircraft, features the USS Marlin (SST-2) submarine, USS Hazard (AM-240) minesweeper, rocket launchers, jet fighter and other aircraft
Fullerton Museum	Fullerton	Nance	Northeast	Local history	Operated by the Nance County Historical Society
Furnas-Gosper County Museum	Arapahoe	Furnas	Southwest	Local history	Operated by the Furnas/Gosper County Historical Society
Gage County Museum	Beatrice	Gage	Southeast	Local history	website, housed in the 1906 Burlington Railroad Depot, history of the industries, businesses, medicine, communities and the people, operated by the Gage County Historical Society
Garfield County Historical Museum	Burwell	Garfield	Sandhills	Local history	Period rooms include a library, surgery room, cowboy/Indian room, tool room, military room, parlor, bedroom, country school room, operated by the Garfield County Historical Society
General Crook House Museum	Omaha	Douglas	Eastern	Historic house	1880s Victorian period home
Genoa Historical Museum	Genoa	Nance	Northeast	Local history	website, includes Pawnee tribal and Mormon Trail exhibits
Genoa U.S. Indian School Museum	Genoa	Nance	Northeast	Education	Former boarding school for Native American youth
George W. Frank House	Kearney	Buffalo	Central	Historic house	Operated by the University of Nebraska at Kearney, 1880s mansion, also features artifacts related to Nebraska and UNK history
Gibbon Heritage Center	Gibbon	Buffalo	Central	Local history	
Gothenburg Historical Museum	Gothenburg	Dawson	Central	Local history	website, operated by the Gothenburg Historical Society
Grant County Museum	Hyannis	Grant	Sandhills	Local history	Features barbed wire collection
Graves Library Museum	Wakefield	Dixon	Eastern	Local history	Operated by the Wakefield Heritage Organization, features a large collection of wrenches
Great Plains Art Museum	Lincoln	Lancaster	Eastern	Art	Part of University of Nebraska–Lincoln, dedicated to the arts of the Great Plains
Great Plains Black History Museum	North Omaha	Douglas	Eastern	African American	
Great Plains Welsh Heritage & Culture Centre	Wymore	Gage	Southeast	Ethnic	website, Welsh Americans and Welsh involvement in the U.S. westward expansion
Great Platte River Road Archway Monument	Kearney	Buffalo	Central	History	Nebraska's and the Platte River valley's role in westward expansion
Greeley County Historical Society Courthouse Museum	Greeley	Greeley	Central	Local history	
Greenwood Depot Museum	Greenwood	Cass	Southeast	Local history	Operated by the Greenwood Historical Society, local and railroad history
Hansen Memorial Museum	Curtis	Frontier	Central	Local history	website, early 20th-century farmhouse with china, glassware, antique furniture, and historical items from old Keith's General Merchandise
Harlan County Museum	Orleans	Harlan	Central	Local history	
Hastings Museum	Hastings	Adams	Central	Multiple	Exhibits on Kool-Aid, natural history dioramas, local history, weapons, life of pioneers on the Plains, rocks, minerals, fossils, antique vehicles, coins, planetarium
Heartland Museum of Military Vehicles	Lexington	Dawson	Central	Military	Includes helicopters, tanks, half-tracks, ambulances, a jeep, weapons, uniforms and memorabilia
Heritage Center Museums	Hay Springs	Sheridan	Nebraska Panhandle	Local history	Operated by the Sheridan County Historical Society
Heritage Park	Henderson	York	Central	Open air	website, includes period farmhouse, heritage house of Russian Mennonite immigrants
Holt County Historical Museum	O'Neill	Holt	Sandhills	Local history	website, operated by the Holt County Historical Society, also known as the Moses P. Kinkaid Law Office Museum
Homestead National Monument of America	Beatrice	Gage	Southeast	History	Influence of the Homestead Act and pioneers
Hooker County Historical Society Museum	Mullen	Hooker	Sandhills	Local history	information
Howard County Historical Village	Saint Paul	Howard	North central	Open air	website, includes church, school, store, blacksmith shop, post office and a depot
Hudson-Meng Bison Kill	Crawford	Dawes	Nebraska Panhandle	Natural history	Ongoing excavations of a bison kill
International Quilt Study Center & Museum	Lincoln	Lancaster	Eastern	Textile	Part of University of Nebraska–Lincoln, includes examples of American and European quilts, contemporary studio quilts and international quilts
John Deere Museum	Tecumseh	Johnson	Southeast	Commodity	Private collection of John Deere memorabilia, including toy vehicles, pocket ledgers, trade cards, calendars, signs, machinery manuals, open by appointment
John G. Neihardt State Historic Site	Bancroft	Cuming	Northeast	Biographical	Operated by the Nebraska State Historical Society, study and museum of poet John Neihardt
Johnson County Historical Museum	Tecumseh	Johnson	Southeast	Local history	Operated by the Johnson County Historical Society
Joslyn Art Museum	Omaha	Douglas	Eastern	Art	Strengths in nineteenth and twentieth century American and European art, Western and Native American art
Joslyn Castle	Omaha	Douglas	Eastern	Historic house	
Kearney Area Children’s Museum	Kearney	Buffalo	Central	Children's	website
Keya Paha County Historical Museum	Springview	Keya Paha	North Central	Local history	Operated by the Keya Paha County Historical Society
Kimmel Harding Nelson Center for the Arts	Nebraska City	Otoe	Southeast	Art	website, changing exhibits
Klown Doll Museum	Plainview	Pierce	Northeast	Doll	website, collection of clown dolls and figurines
Knight Museum and Sand Hills Center	Alliance	Box Butte	Nebraska Panhandle	Local history	website, exhibits on life in the Sandhills, Native Americans, rural, country and city life, railroads
Kregel Windmill Museum	Nebraska City	Otoe	Southeast	Technology	Factory and collection of water-pumping windmills
Kruger Collection	Lincoln	Lancaster	Eastern	Art	website, located within the College of Architecture at University of Nebraska–Lincoln, miniature furniture and decorative arts
Legacy of the Plains Museum	Gering	Scotts Bluff	Nebraska Pandhandle	Agriculture and local history	website, includes pioneer and early community artifacts, antique tractors and farm implements, an 80-acre working farm, historic farmstead structures
Lester F. Larsen Tractor Museum	Lincoln	Lancaster	Eastern	Agriculture	Historic tractor testing equipment and tractors, part of University of Nebraska–Lincoln
Lewis and Clark National Historic Trail Headquarters and Visitor Center	Omaha	Douglas	Eastern	History	Exhibits about the explorers and information about sites along the trail
Lewis and Clark Visitor Center at Calumet Bluff	Crofton	Cedar	Northeast	Multiple	History of the Expedition, geology, exploration, settlement and natural history of the Missouri River region, construction of the Gavins Point Dam
Lighthouse Museum	Republican City	Harlan	Central	Commodity	Period displays and collectibles include clothing, stoves, toys and dolls, Lionel and American Flyer train sets, clocks, glassware, kitchen room displays, farm tools, McCoy pottery
Lincoln Children's Museum	Lincoln	Lancaster	Eastern	Children's	website
Lincoln County Historical Museum	North Platte	Lincoln	Sandhills	Open air	website, exhibits include World War II canteen display, period room settings, doctor's office, telephone office, post office, beauty shop, DAR collection, natural history, a model railroad, railroad, household items; complex includes barn, 1860 Pony Express log building, Fort McPherson Headquarters building, DAR Log Cabin, school/library, Lutheran Church, school, 1899 furnished house, barber shop, general store, depot, two story log house, caboose
Lodgepole Depot Museum	Lodgepole	Cheyenne	Nebraska Panhandle	Local history	Includes period antiques and household items, operated by the Lodgepole Historical Society
Long Pine Heritage House Museum	Long Pine	Brown	Sandhills	Local history	
Love’s Jazz and Art Center	Omaha	Douglas	Eastern	African American	African American art, culture, jazz, history
Louis E. May Museum	Fremont	Dodge	Northeast	Historic house	website, operated by the Dodge County Historical Society, late 19th-early 20th-century period mansion, grounds are a Nebraska Arboretum Site
Lux Center for the Arts	Lincoln	Lancaster	Eastern	Art	website, includes Lux Museum with contemporary art, craft, and design
Madison County Museum	Madison	Madison	Northeast	Local history	website, operated by the Madison County Historical Society, includes firefighting equipment, telephone pioneers communications, model railroad, baseball player Richie Ashburn, area fur farms displays, Christmas village
Mansion on the Hill	Ogallala	Keith	Sandhills	Historic house	website, 1887 Victorian mansion, operated by the Keith County Historical Society
Mari Sandoz High Plains Heritage Center	Chadron	Dawes	Nebraska Panhandle	Multiple	Part of Chadron State College, life and literature of Mari Sandoz and the culture of the High Plains
Marxhausen Gallery of Art	Seward	Seward	Southeast	Art	Part of Concordia University
Mayhew Cabin & Historic Village	Nebraska City	Otoe	Southeast	Historic house	1855 cabin, site along the Underground Railroad, also known as John Brown's Cave
Merrick County Historical Museum	Central City	Merrick	Central	Local history	Operated by the Merrick County Historical Society
Missouri River Basin Lewis & Clark Interpretive Trail & Visitors Center	Nebraska City	Otoe	Southeast	History	website, features keelboat replica, flora, fauna and scientific discoveries recorded by the Lewis & Clark expedition
Mormon Trail Center	Omaha	Douglas	Eastern	History	website, information, Mormon pioneer history, located in Winter Quarters
Murdock Museum	Murdock	Cass	Southeast	Local history	website, operated by the Murdock Historical Society
Musbach Museum	Scribner	Dodge	Northeast	Local history	
Museum of American Speed	Lincoln	Lancaster	Southeast	Automobile	Racing and hot rodding cars, engines, parts, toys and memorabilia
Museum of Nebraska Major League Baseball	Saint Paul	Howard	North central	Sports	website
Museum of Nebraska Art	Kearney	Buffalo	Central	Art	Official state museum of art, part of University of Nebraska at Kearney
Museum of Nebraska History	Lincoln	Lancaster	Eastern	State History	Operated by the Nebraska State Historical Society
Museum of Missouri River History	Brownville	Nemaha	Southeast	Maritime	Housed in the museum ship Captain Meriwether Lewis
Museum of the Fur Trade	Chadron	Dawes	Nebraska Panhandle	Industry	Story of the fur trade industry
Museum of the High Plains	McCook	Red Willow	Central	Local history	
National Museum of Roller Skating	Lincoln	Lancaster	Eastern	Sports	Established in 1980, the museum maintains the largest collection of roller skating artifacts and textual materials in the world, including both inline skates and quad skates. website
Nelson House	Nebraska City	Otoe	Southeast	Historic house	website, operated by the Nebraska City Historical Society, Victorian-period house and displays of local history, also known as the Taylor-Wessel-Bickel House
Nebraska Baseball Hall of Fame	Beatrice	Gage	Southeast	Sports	website, players, umpires, managers and entrepreneurs to semi-professional baseball
Nebraska City Museum Of Firefighting	Nebraska City	Otoe	Southeast	Firefighting	website, historic firefighting vehicles, equipment, uniforms
Nebraska Firefighters Museum and Education Center	Kearney	Buffalo	Central	Firefighting	website
Nebraska Governor's Mansion	Lincoln	Lancaster	Eastern	Historic house	
Nebraska Jewish Historical Society	Omaha	Douglas	Eastern	Jewish	Jewish history in Nebraska, includes the Riekes Museum, a re-creation of a neighborhood shul
Nebraska Prairie Museum	Holdrege	Phelps	South central	History	website, operated by the Phelps County Historical Society, exhibits include period clothing, antique toys, farm equipment, tools and household items, a W.W.II German POW exhibit room
Nebraska School for Deaf Museum	Omaha	Douglas	Eastern	History	History of the school and deaf culture
Nebraska State Historical Society	Lincoln	Lancaster	Eastern	History	Headquarters in Lincoln features an exhibit about the history of the Society
Neligh Mill State Historic Site	Neligh	Antelope	Eastern	Mill	Operated by the Nebraska State Historical Society, restored 1880s water-powered grist mill
Nemaha Valley Museum	Auburn	Nemaha	Southeast	Local history	website
Niobrara Museum	Niobrara	Knox	Northeast	Local history	
North Platte Area Children's Museum	North Platte	Lincoln	Sandhills	Children's	website
Nuckolls County Museum	Superior	Nuckolls	Southeast	Local history	Operated by the Nuckolls County Historical Society, artifacts in eight buildings
Old Freighters Museum	Nebraska City	Otoe	Southeast	Historic house	website, operated by the Nebraska City Historical Society, mid 19th-century house, history and importance of transportation to the development of the community
Old West Trail Center	Odell	Gage	Southeast	Local history	Area transportation history and local history
Omaha Black Music Hall of Fame	Omaha	Douglas	Eastern	Hall of fame	
Omaha Children's Museum	Omaha	Douglas	Eastern	Children's	
Otoe County Museum of Memories	Syracuse	Otoe	Southeast	Local history	Includes church with period room and business displays
Pawnee City Historical Society & Museum	Pawnee City	Pawnee	Southeast	Open air	
Pedal Clinic	Pawnee City	Pawnee	Southeast	Commodity	Restored antique pedal cars and tractors, open on special occasions or by appointment only
Perkins County Historical Museum	Grant	Perkins	Central	Local history	
Peru Museum	Peru	Nemaha	Southeast	Local history	
Petrified Wood Gallery	Ogallala	Keith	Sandhills	Natural history	website, ancient woods and fossils from around the world, Native American arrowheads and area artifacts
Pierce Historical Society Museum	Pierce	Pierce	Northeast	Open air	website, includes main museum with period history and business displays, a depot with household furnishings and items, machine shop with antique farm equipment and vehicles, blacksmith shop and one room schoolhouse
Pierson Wildlife Museum Learning Center	Neligh	Antelope	Eastern	Natural history	website, mounted big game trophy dioramas
Pilger Museum	Pilger	Stanton	Northeast	Local history	Operated by the Historical Society of Stanton County
Pioneer Trails Museum	Bridgeport	Morrill	Nebraska Panhandle	Local history	
Pioneer Village	Minden	Kearney	Central	Open air	Features 28 buildings on 20 acres (81,000 m^{2}) including frontier buildings, early cars and airplanes, tractors and other farm implements and an art collection
Plains Historical Museum	Kimball	Kimball	Nebraska Panhandle	Local history	Open in the summer
Plainsman Museum	Aurora	Hamilton	Central	Local history	Everyday life of the plains settlers, area agricultural history, period rooms, period shop and business displays, American Civil War, wildlife mounts, automobiles, dolls, late 19th-century house, schoolhouse, working blacksmith shop
Plainview Historical Museum	Plainview	Pierce	Northeast	Local history	Operated by the Plainview Historical Society, housed in a former depot
Platte County Museum	Columbus	Platte		Local history	website, includes fossils, Indian stone tools, local historical artifacts, Victorian clothing, furnishings and heirlooms
Polk County Historical Society Museum	Osceola	Polk		Open air	
Polish Heritage Center	Ashton	Sherman	Central	Ethnic	Facebook site, Polish history and culture, history of area Polish settlers and immigrants
Ponca State Park	Ponca	Dixon	Northeast	Local history	Includes the Missouri National Recreational River Resource and Education Center with exhibits about the Missouri River and its history
Ponca Tribal Museum and Library	Niobrara	Knox	Northeast	Native American	website, history and culture of the Ponca Tribe of Nebraska, includes photos, headdresses, tools, beadwork, jewelry, musical instruments, carvings
Pony Express Station	Gothenburg	Dawson	Central	History	Two former Pony Express station sites
Potter Historical Museum	Potter	Cheyenne	Nebraska Panhandle	Local history	Open by appointment
Prairie Country School	Murdock	Cass	Southeast	Education	website, 1890s-period one room schoolhouse
Prairie Schooner Museum	Dalton	Cheynne	Nebraska Panhandle	Local history	
Richardson County Historical Museum	Falls City	Richardson	Southeast	Local history	website, operated by the Richardson County Historical Society
Richardson County Military Museum	Falls City	Richardson	Southeast	Military	Located in the courthouse, includes photographs, uniforms and equipment
River Country Nature Center	Nebraska City	Otoe	Southeast	Natural history	Nature dioramas, animal mounts, Native American artifacts
Riverside Discovery Center	Scottsbluff	Scotts Bluff	Nebraska Panhandle	Natural history	Park and zoo, will include natural history displays of the former Wildlife World
Robert Henri Museum	Cozad	Cozad	Central	Art, Local History	Facebook site, Childhood home of artist Robert Henri, houses a large collection of original works
Robert Hillestad Textiles Gallery	Lincoln	Lancaster	Eastern	Textile	website, part of University of Nebraska–Lincoln, located on the second floor of the Home Economics building
Rock Bluffs School	Rock Bluff	Cass	Southeast	School	Open by appointment with the Cass County Historical Society
Rock County Historical Museum	Bassett	Rock	Sandhills	Open air	Operated by the Rock County Historical Society, complex includes depot museum with local history and period historic displays, schoolhouse, log house with period displays, historic church
Rock Creek Station State Historical Park	Endicott	Jefferson	Southeast	History	Reconstructed buildings and corrals of the road ranch, Pony Express Station and Stagecoach stop along the Oregon Trail, visitor center exhibits
Rock Island Depot Railroad Museum	Fairbury	Jefferson	Southeast	Railroad	Rock Island Railroad artifacts and history
Rock School House Museum	Oshkosh	Garden	Nebraska Panhandle	Local history	Operated by the Garden County Historical Society
Rotunda Gallery	Lincoln	Lancaster	Eastern	Art	Part of University of Nebraska–Lincoln
Russ Snyder Museum	Oak	Nuckolls	Southeast	Biographical	Life of baseball player Russ Snyder, also local history
Saline County Historical Society Museum	Dorchester	Saline		Local history	
Sallows Military Museum	Alliance	Box Butte	Nebraska Panhandle	Military	website, includes flags, helmets, gas masks, medals, uniforms and accessories
Sandhills Museum	Valentine	Cherry	Sandhills	History	Open by appointment, collections include pre-1928 cars, firearms, farm machinery and tools, steam-driven band saw, moonshine still, broom making machine, lamps, dishes and a calf with two heads and five legs
Sarpy County Museum	Bellevue	Sarpy	Southeast	Local history	Includes period room displays, Native American artifacts, model of historic Fort Crook/Offutt Field and depot
Saunders County Museum	Wahoo	Saunders	Eastern	Open air	website, operated by the Saunders County Historical Society, includes main museum with displays about movie producer Darryl F. Zanuck, composer Howard Hanson, baseball player Sam Crawford, artist C. W. Anderson, scientist George Beadle and a complex including an 1873 log home, 1890s schoolhouse, 1889 country church, railroad depot, post office and machine shed
Sautter House	Papillion	Sarpy	Southeast	Historic house	Operated by the Papillion Area Historical Society
Scamahorn Museum	Gordon	Sheridan	Western	Local history	Operated by the Sheridan County Historical Society
Schramm Park State Recreation Area	Gretna	Sarpy	Southeast	Natural history	Includes fish hatchery museum, Aksarben Aquarium with fish, reptiles and amphibians, geologic display
Schuyler/Colfax County Museum	Schuyler	Colfax	Northeast	Local history	
Scotts Bluff National Monument	Gering	Scotts Bluff	Nebraska Panhandle	History	Features the Oregon Trail Museum and Visitor Center, including art by William Henry Jackson
Sellors Barton Museum	Ainsworth	Brown	Sandhills	Local history	
Senator George Norris State Historic Site	McCook	Red Willow	Central	Biographical	Operated by the Nebraska State Historical Society, home of George W. Norris
Seward County Historical Society Museum	Goehner	Seward	Southeast	Local history	Facebook site, includes main museum, a historic house, schoolhouse, model railroad, antique farm equipment and vehicles
Sheldon Museum of Art	Lincoln	Lancaster	Eastern	Art	Part of University of Nebraska–Lincoln, American art in all media
Sheridan County Historical Museum	Rushville	Sheridan	Nebraska Panhandle	Local history	Operated by the Sheridan County Historical Society
Sherman County Historical Society Museum	Loup City	Sherman	Central	Local history	information
Silver Hills Museum	Oshkosh	Garden	Nebraska Panhandle	Local history	Operated by the Garden County Historical Society, also known as the Opera House Museum, features bird collection, period rooms
Sioux County Historical Museum	Harrison	Sioux	Nebraska Panhandle	Local history	Includes museum, post office, schoolhouse and house/telephone office
Smith Lime Kiln	Fairbury	Jefferson	Southeast	Historic house	Operated by the Jefferson County Historical Society
Sod House Museum	Gothenburg	Dawson	Central	Historic house	Sod house, world's largest plow, bison made of barb wire
Stanton Heritage Museum	Stanton	Stanton	Northeast	Local history	
Steele City Museum	Steele City	Jefferson	Eastern	Open air	Operated by the Jefferson County Historical Society, includes working blacksmith shop, livery barn, school, bank, 1880s stone church, antique farm machinery display
Strang Museum	Strang	Fillmore	Southeast	Local history	Open during special events or by appointment
Strategic Air and Space Museum	Ashland	Cass	Eastern	Aerospace	United States Air Force military aircraft and nuclear missiles
Stuhr Museum of the Prairie Pioneer	Grand Island	Hall	Central	Living	Stuhr Museum is known for providing immersive historical, educational, and cultural experiences for visitors. Key highlights include Railroad Town, open May through mid-September each year, and a variety of permanent and rotating exhibits in the Leo B. Stuhr Building, open year-round.
Sturdevant-McKee Museum	Atkinson	Holt	Sandhills	Historic house	Open by appointment and for events, mid 20th-century period house
Sudman-Niemann Heritage House Museum	Chappell	Deuel	Nebraska Panhandle	Historic house	Early 20th-century period house
Swedish Heritage Center	Oakland	Burt	Northeast	Ethnic	Swedish memorabilia and culture
Table Rock Pioneer History Museum	Table Rock	Pawnee		Local history	Operated by the Table Rock Historical Society"Table Rock Historical Society". Pawnee County NE GenWeb.
Thayer County Museum	Belvidere	Thayer	Southeast	Local history	website, includes museum with local history displays, period rooms, natural and cultural history displays, household items, agriculture building with farm tools and equipment, school house, caboose, operated by the Thayer County Historical Society
Thomas County Historical Society Museum	Thedford	Thomas	Sandhills	Local history	
Thomas P. Kennard House	Lincoln	Lancaster	Eastern	Historic house	Operated by the Nebraska State Historical Society, 1870s Victorian period house
A Touch Of The Past Museum	De Witt	Saline	Southeast	History	Open by appointment, private collection of arrowheads, buffalo skulls, Native American jewelry, coins, early 1800s newspapers, mastodon teeth, ox shoes, antique farm equipment
Trails & Rails Museum	Kearney	Buffalo	Central	Open air	website, operated by the Buffalo County Historical Society, includes depot, steam engine, caboose, 1850s ranch house, 1880s hotel, 1898 church, 1860s log cabin, 1871 schoolhouse
Trailside Museum of Natural History	Crawford	Dawes	Nebraska Panhandle	Natural history	Operated by the University of Nebraska State Museum, located inside Fort Robinson State Park, features fossils from Ashfall Fossil Beds State Historical Park and near the fort
Tri-State Old Time Cowboys Memorial Museum	Gordon	Sheridan	Western	History	Ranching and cowboy life artifacts and history
University of Nebraska State Museum	Lincoln	Lancaster	Eastern	Natural history	Part of University of Nebraska–Lincoln, fossils, dinosaurs, ancient life, wildlife dioramas, gems and minerals, American Indian and African exhibits
Valley County Museum	Ord	Valley	North central	Local history	Operated by the Valley County Historical Society
Valley Historical Society Museum	Valley	Douglas	Eastern	Local history	
Verdigre Heritage Museum	Verdigre	Knox	Northeast	Open air	Features four buildings including a jail and grist mill, open by appointment and for special events
Wakefield Train Depot	Wakefield	Dixon	Eastern	Railroad	Operated by the Wakefield Heritage Organization
Washington County Museum	Fort Calhoun	Washington	Northeast	Local history	Operated by the Washington County Historical Association, also tours by appointment of the early 20th-century Frahm House
Wayne County Museum	Wayne	Wayne	Northeast	Local history	
Webster County Historical Museum	Red Cloud	Red Cloud	Northeast	Local history	information
Weeping Water Museum	Weeping Water	Cass	Southeast	Local history	website, operated by the Weeping Water Historical Society, includes the Heritage House Museum, Memory Lane Museum, displays on Native American culture, frontier life, fossils and geology, doctor's office, area businesses
Wessels Living History Farm	York	York	Central	Farm	website, features 1925 period farmhouse, barn, tractor museum and windmill in a working farm
Wheel Museum	Brownville	Nemaha	Southeast	Transportation	website, horse-drawn vehicles, farming equipment and more, operated by the Brownville Historical Society
White Horse Heritage Village and Museum	Stuart	Holt	Sandhills	Local history	
Wilber Czech Museum	Wilber	Saline	Southeast	Ethnic	website, includes Czech dolls, clothing, household items, replicas of early immigrant homes and early Wilber businesses
Wildwood Historic Center	Nebraska City	Otoe	Southeast	Historic house	website, 1869 Victorian house and art gallery
Willa Cather State Historic Site	Red Cloud	Webster	Northeast	Biographical	website, operated by the Nebraska State Historical Society, includes the Willa Cather House, the Cather Museum in the Garber Bank, and several sites important in her life and works
William Jennings Bryan House	Lincoln	Lancaster	Eastern	Biographical	Also known as Fairview, home of orator William Jennings Bryan
Willow Point Gallery	Ashland	Cass	Eastern	Multiple	Also known as Gene Roncka Gallery/Museum, commercial art gallery with natural history dioramas of the Archie Hightshoe Big Game Collection
Wisner Heritage Museum	Wisner	Cuming	Northeast	Local history	
York Area Children's Museum	York	York	Central	Children's	website

== Defunct museums ==
- Frank H. Woods Telephone Museum, Lincoln, permanently closed in July 2018.
- Lentz Center for Asian Culture, Lincoln, part of the University of Nebraska–Lincoln, closed to public visits
- National Korean War Museum, Oxford, opened and closed in 2005 due to fraud
- VietNam War National Museum, Nelson, photos, closed due to fraud
- Wildlife World, Gering, also known as WyoBraska Natural History Museum, collections moving to Riverside Discovery Center in Scottsbluff

== See also ==
- Nature Centers in Nebraska

== Resources ==
- Central Nebraska Adventures
