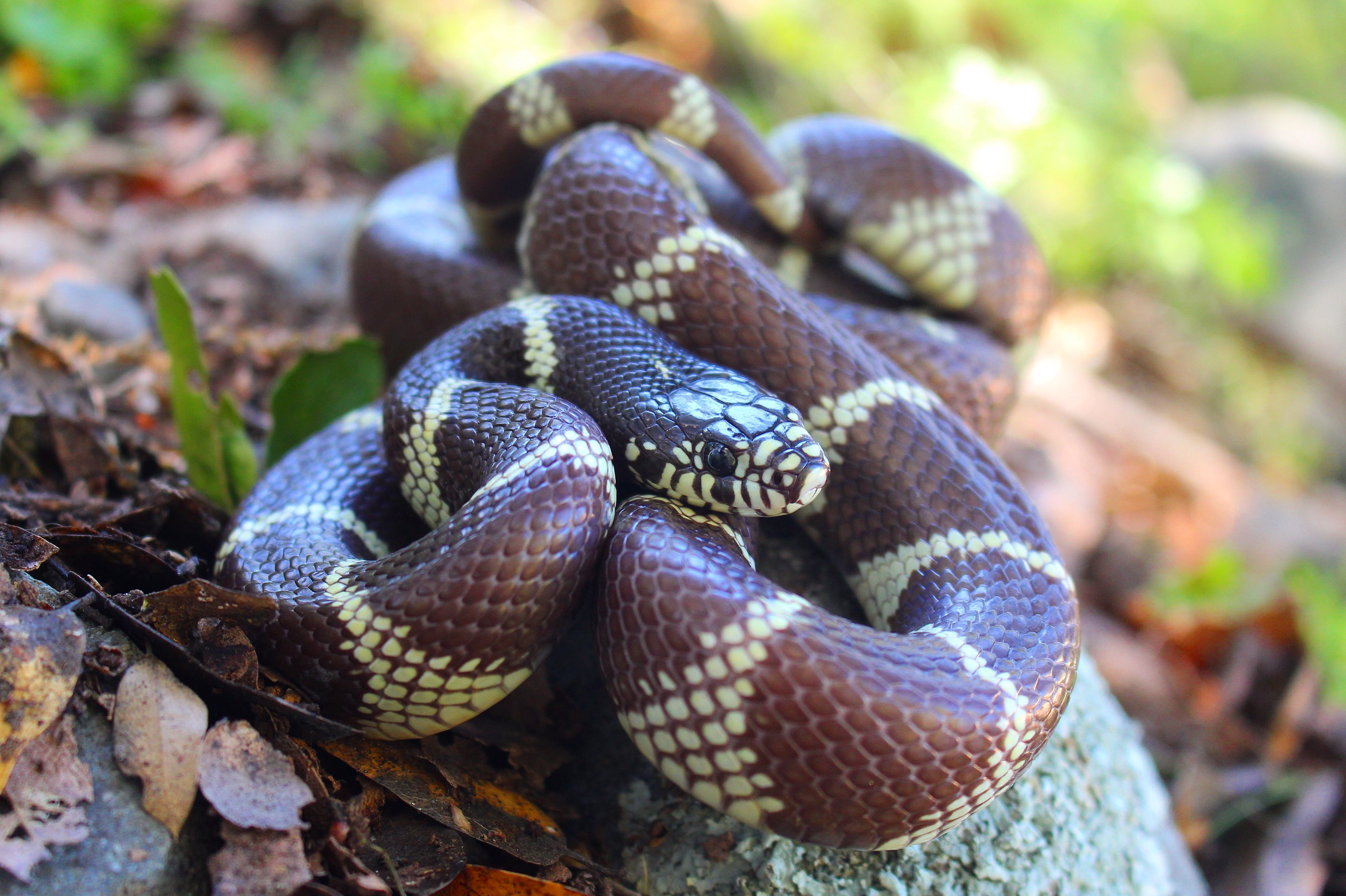

Conservation status
- Least Concern (IUCN 3.1)

Scientific classification
- Kingdom: Animalia
- Phylum: Chordata
- Class: Reptilia
- Order: Squamata
- Suborder: Serpentes
- Family: Colubridae
- Genus: Lampropeltis
- Species: L. californiae

Binomial name
- Lampropeltis californiae (Blainville, 1835)
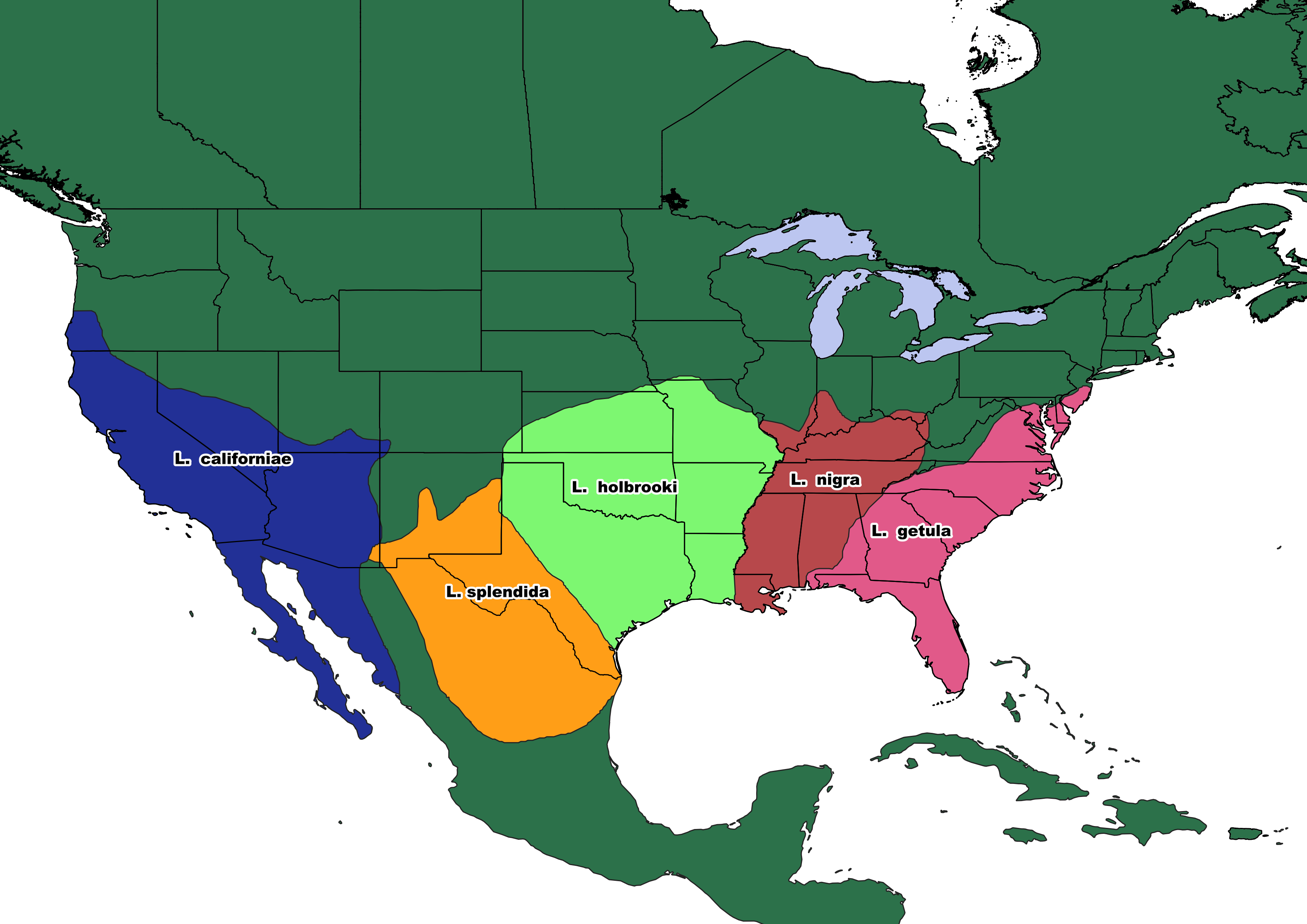

Synonyms
- Coluber (Ophis) californiae Blainville, 1835; Lampropeltis californiae — Van Denburgh, 1897; Ophibolus getulus californiae — Cope, 1900

= California kingsnake =

Species of snake

The California King Snake (Lampropeltis californiae) is a nonvenomous colubrid snake endemic to the western United States and northern Mexico, and is found in a variety of habitats. Due to ease of care and a wide range of color variations, the California king snake is one of the most popular snakes in captivity.

== Description ==
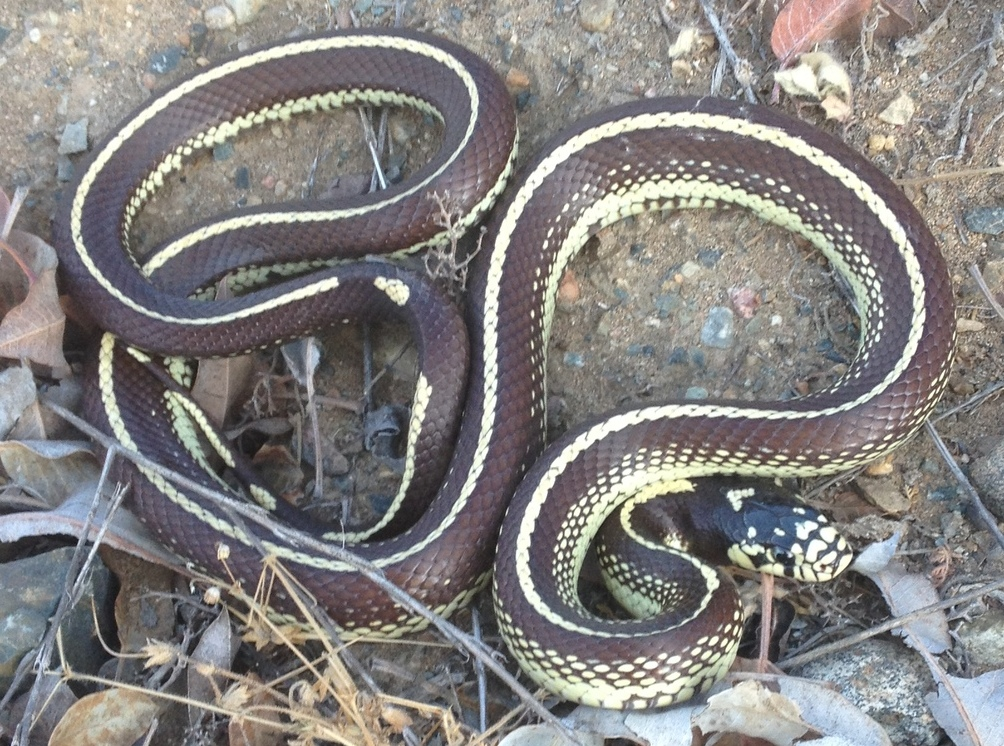
The striped variant, in San Diego county

Wild California kingsnakes are typically encountered at a length of 2.5–3.5 feet (76–107 cm), though they can grow larger; California kingsnakes on Isla Ángel de la Guarda, Baja California, Mexico, have been documented growing to 78 inches (2 m). A wide range of color morphs exist in the wild; they are usually found with alternating dark and light bands ranging in color from black and white to brown and cream. Some populations may have longitudinal stripes instead of bands. Most California kingsnakes live to be around ten to fifteen years old, even surpassing twenty if well cared for in captivity.

California kingsnakes stripes and bands are essential to their survival as the patterns camouflage the snakes body to hide from predators. Their predators include hawks, eagles, coyotes, skunks, foxes, bobcats, and other kingsnakes.

== Range and habitat ==
The California kingsnake is widespread along the West Coast of North America to elevations of approximately 6,100 ft (1,900 m) in the Tehachapi Mountains and to over 7,000 ft (2,100 m) in the southeastern Sierra Nevada Mountains. This species lives in a wide variety of habitats, including woodland chaparral, grassland, deserts, marshes, and even suburban areas. These snakes live in Oregon, California, Nevada, Utah, Arizona, southwestern Colorado, northwestern New Mexico, and northwestern Mexico. These snakes thrive in the temperatures between 80–84 °F and a humidity around 35–60%. The optimal environment can differ depending on the biological state of the snake. For instance, during reproduction they prefer even warmer temperatures, and in the process of shedding, they prefer higher humidity. In Arizona, they intergrade with the desert kingsnake (Lampropeltis splendida) and the Mexican black kingsnake (Lampropeltis getula nigrita).

The species has also become invasive on the Spanish island of Gran Canaria. In 2014 the population there had reached an estimated 20,000 individuals. California kingsnakes in Gran Canaria tend to use rocky or stony habitats with good vegetation cover, even frequently using other invasive shrub species such as Opuntia dillenii and Cenchrus setaceus.

== Behavior ==
The California kingsnake is cathemeral; it may be active day or night depending on ambient temperatures. When disturbed, California kingsnakes often coil their bodies into a ball to hide their heads, hiss, and rattle their tails, which can produce a sound somewhat resembling that of a rattlesnake. When they are nervous they tend to twitch their tails. They are considered harmless to humans, but if handled it is common for this species to bite, as well as to excrete musk and fecal contents from their cloaca. It is also common for this musky odor to be excreted when the snake feels threatened. California kingsnakes are considered to be generally solitary, but when mating season or brumation is in process, they group together.

California Kingsnakes, along with other reptiles and amphibians in winter months, brumate as a means of conserving energy and to regulate body temperatures during cold temperatures. During brumation, California king snakes neither eat nor excrete feces, but they occasionally awake to drink water. Also in efforts to regulate body temperatures, California kingsnakes tend to burrow underneath vegetation or other coverings to cool down, and to bask in the sun to increase their internal temperatures.

== Diet ==
California kingsnakes are opportunistic feeders and common food items include rodents, birds, other reptiles and amphibians. The "king" in their name refers to their propensity to hunt and eat other snakes, including venomous rattlesnakes; California kingsnakes are naturally resistant to the venom of rattlesnakes. California kingsnakes are non-venomous and kill prey by constriction; they are the strongest constrictors proportionate to body size of any snakes. This adaptation may have evolved in response to the kingsnake's preferred reptilian prey, which needs less oxygen to survive an attack by constriction than mammalian prey items.

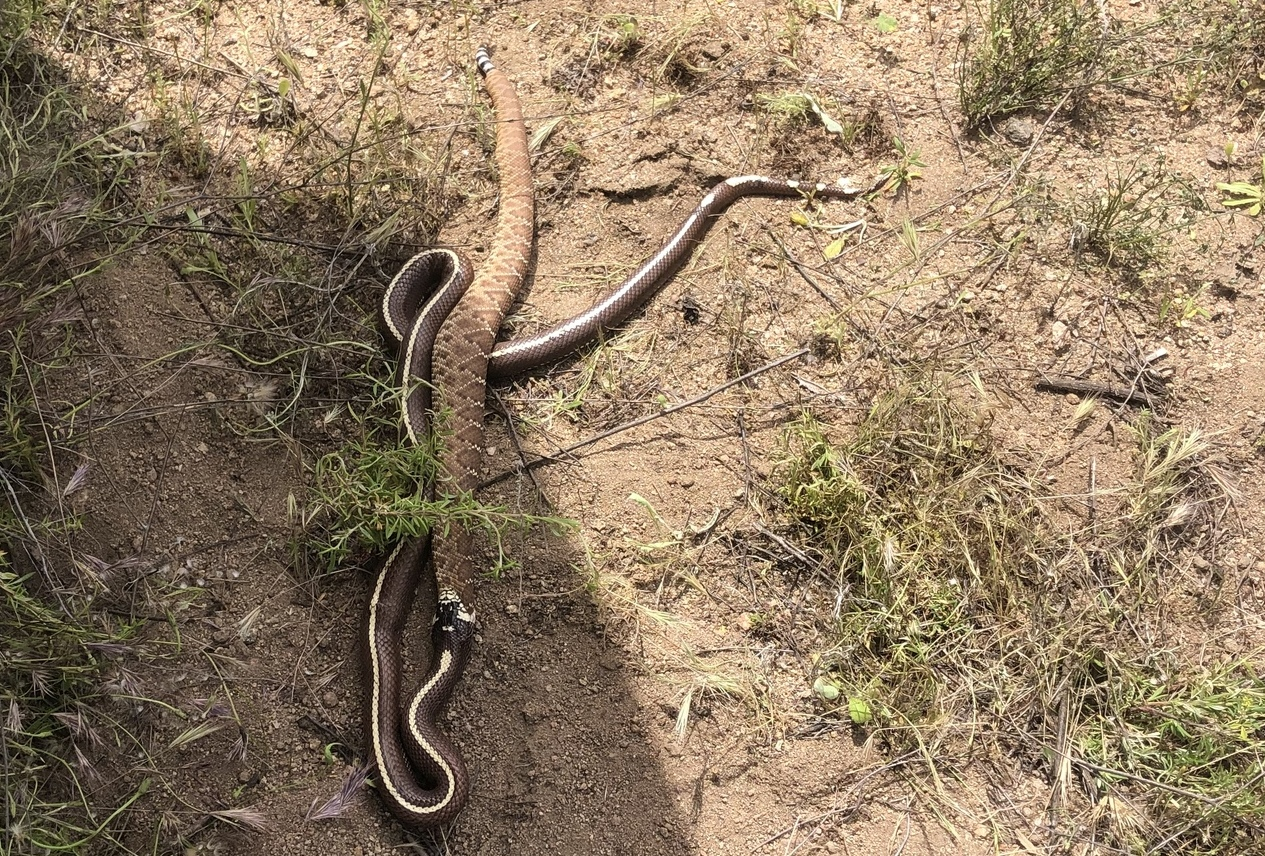
Eating a red diamond rattlesnake

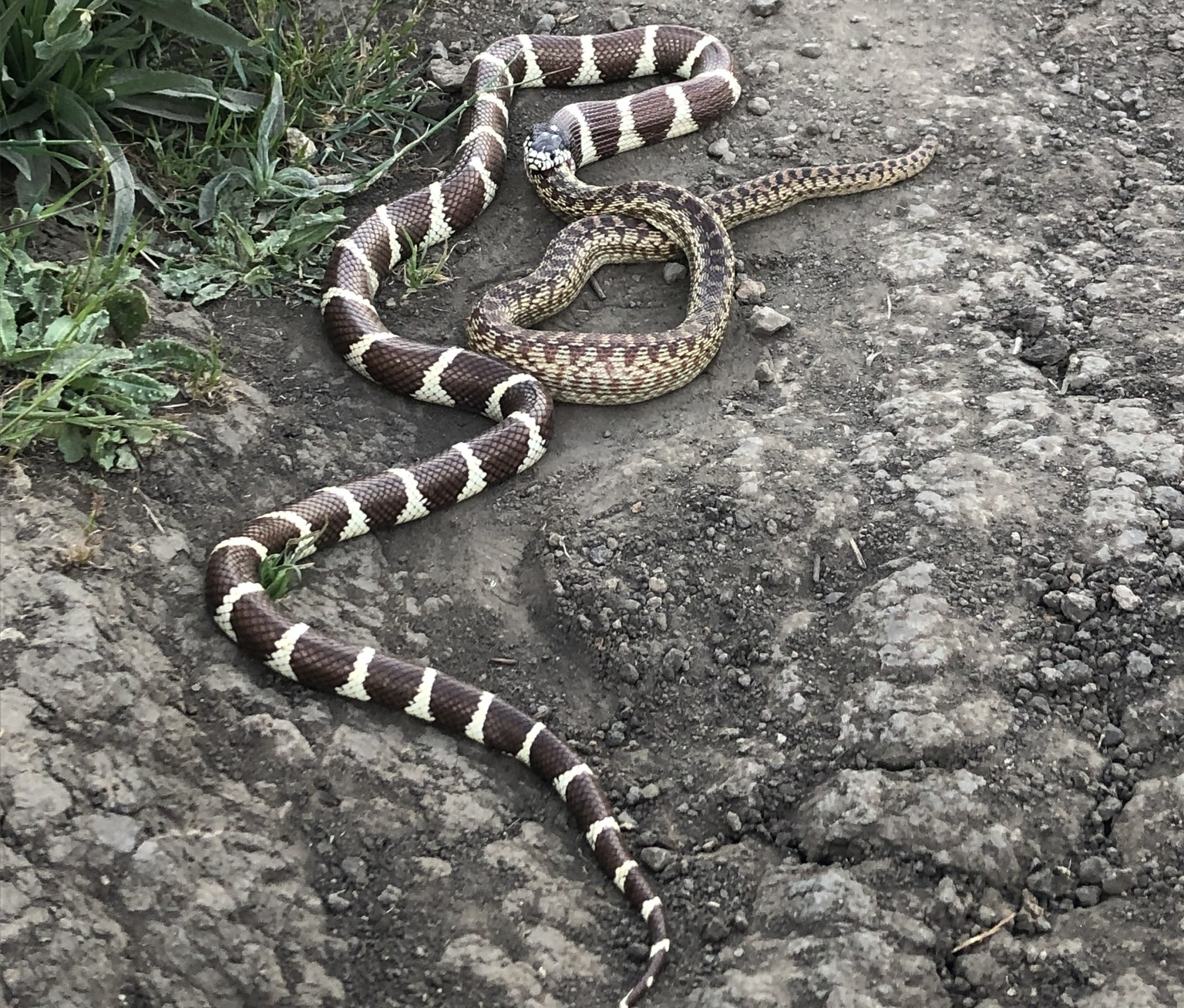
Eating a gopher snake

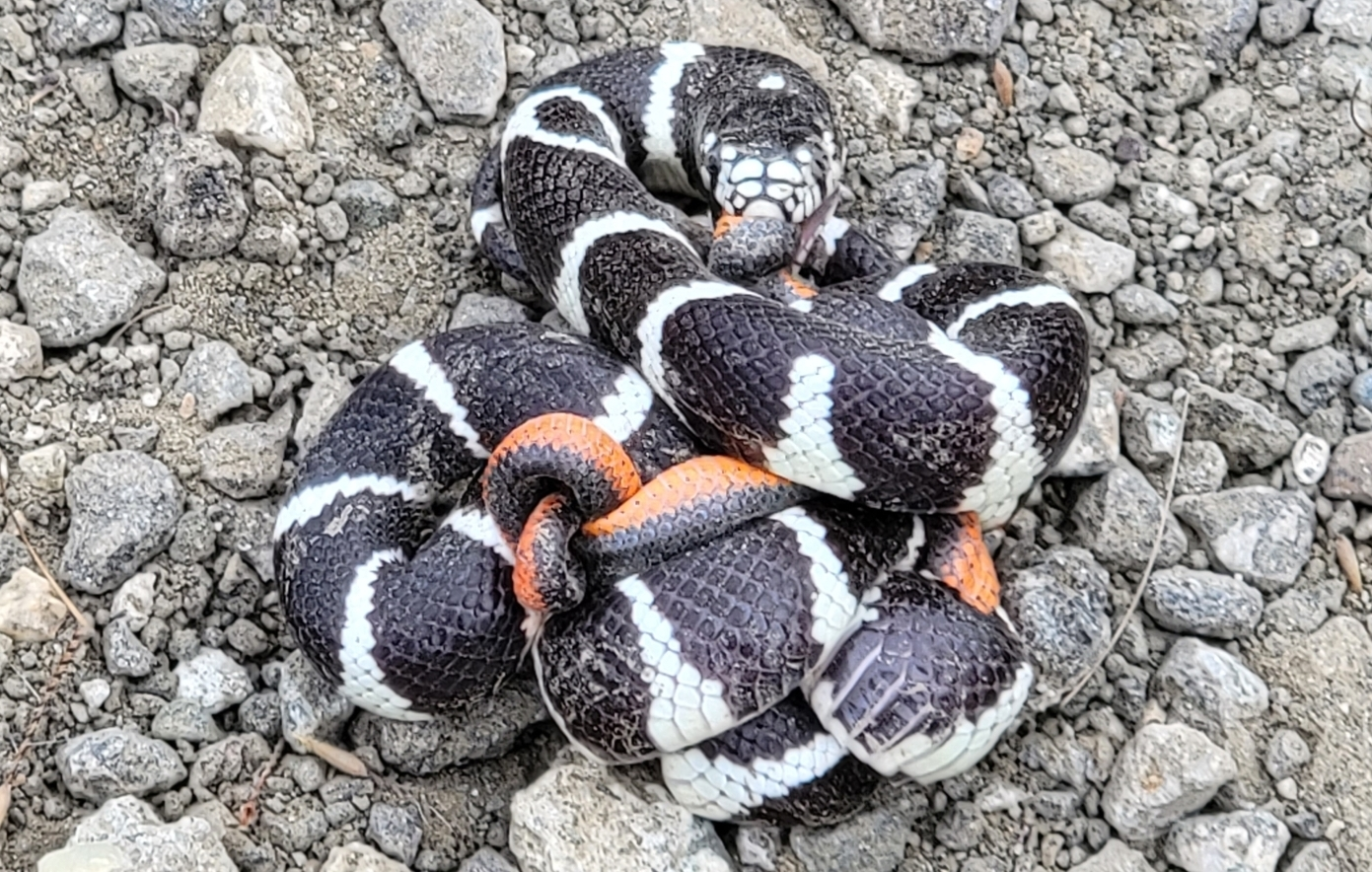
Eating a pacific ring-necked snake

== Reproduction ==
The California kingsnake is an oviparous internal fertilization animal, meaning it lays eggs, as opposed to giving live birth like some other snakes. Courtship for this kingsnake begins in the spring usually sometime after their hibernation or first shedding and involves the males competing for available females. In order to assert dominance when fighting another male, the California Kingsnake will get onto the other male and proceed biting the other snake. Their mating ritual begins by the male snake vibrating uncontrollably. Eggs are laid between May and August, which is generally 42–63 days after mating; in preparation the female will have chosen a suitable location. The typical clutch size is five to 12 eggs with an average of nine, though clutches of 20 or more eggs are known. The hatchlings usually emerge another 40–65 days later and are approximately eight to 13 inches in length. Newly hatched kingsnakes stay in their nest for about one week, before shedding their first coat of skin and eventually leaving the nest. Adult California kingsnakes are most commonly 2.5–3.5 feet in length, and rarely exceed four feet.

== In captivity ==
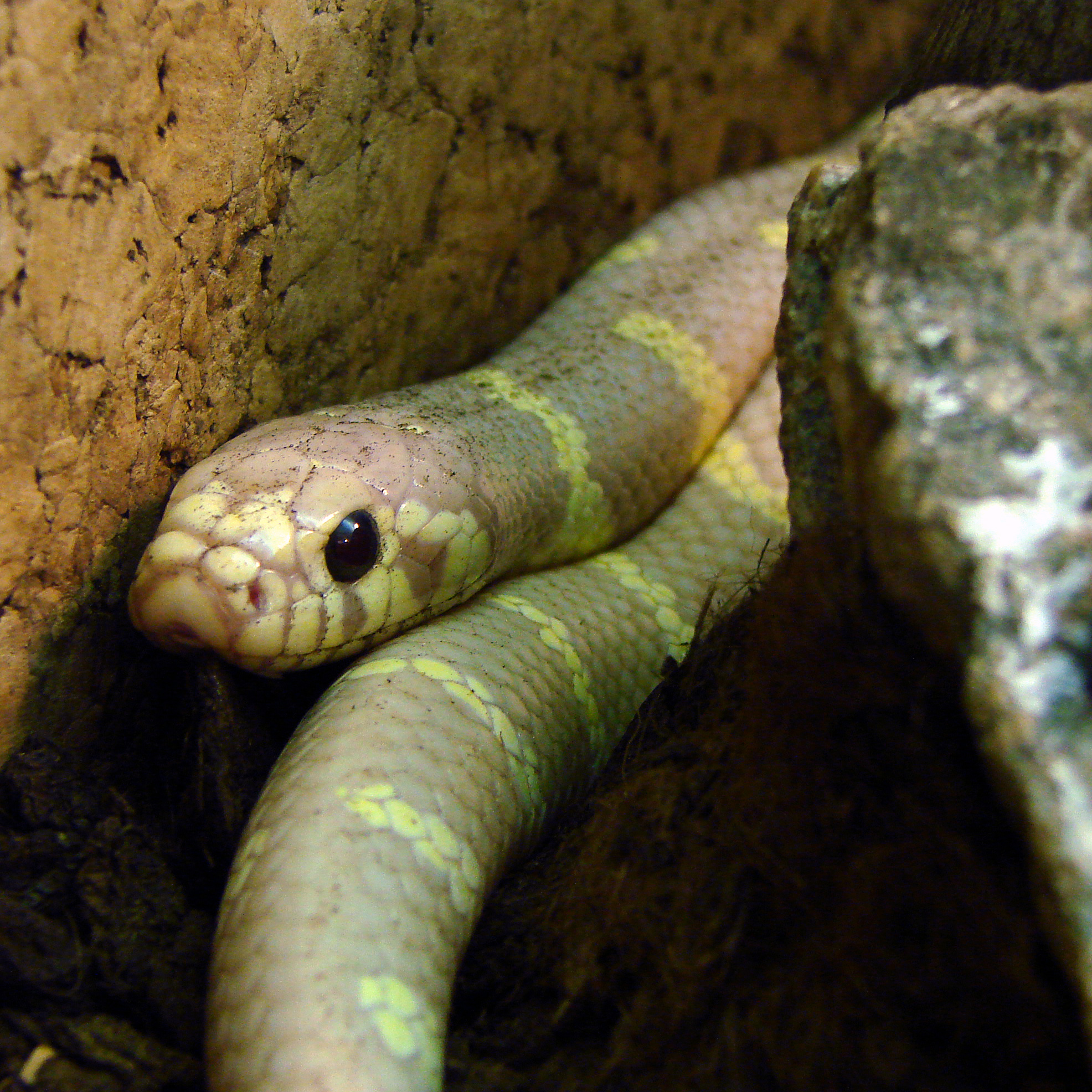
Captive-bred Lavender morph

The California kingsnake is one of the most popular pet reptiles due to its ease of care, attractive appearance and docile demeanor. Due to natural color and pattern variability between individual snakes, snake enthusiasts have selectively bred for a variety of color patterns known as "morphs". Wild-type California kingsnakes are technically illegal to sell without special permits in their home state of California. These increased restrictions are due to a law that prohibits sale of native California species within state lines; albino morphs are exempt from this law. The law is loosely enforced.

In the wild, kingsnakes are able to thermoregulate, migrating to warmer areas if needed due to their cold bloodedness. However, in captivity, kingsnakes are not able to freely change locations so most owners use heat lamps, heating pads, and regulate temperatures in their homes to ensure the health of the kingsnake. Temperatures between 70 °F and 85 °F are adequate for kingsnakes in captivity.

== Two-headed Snake ==
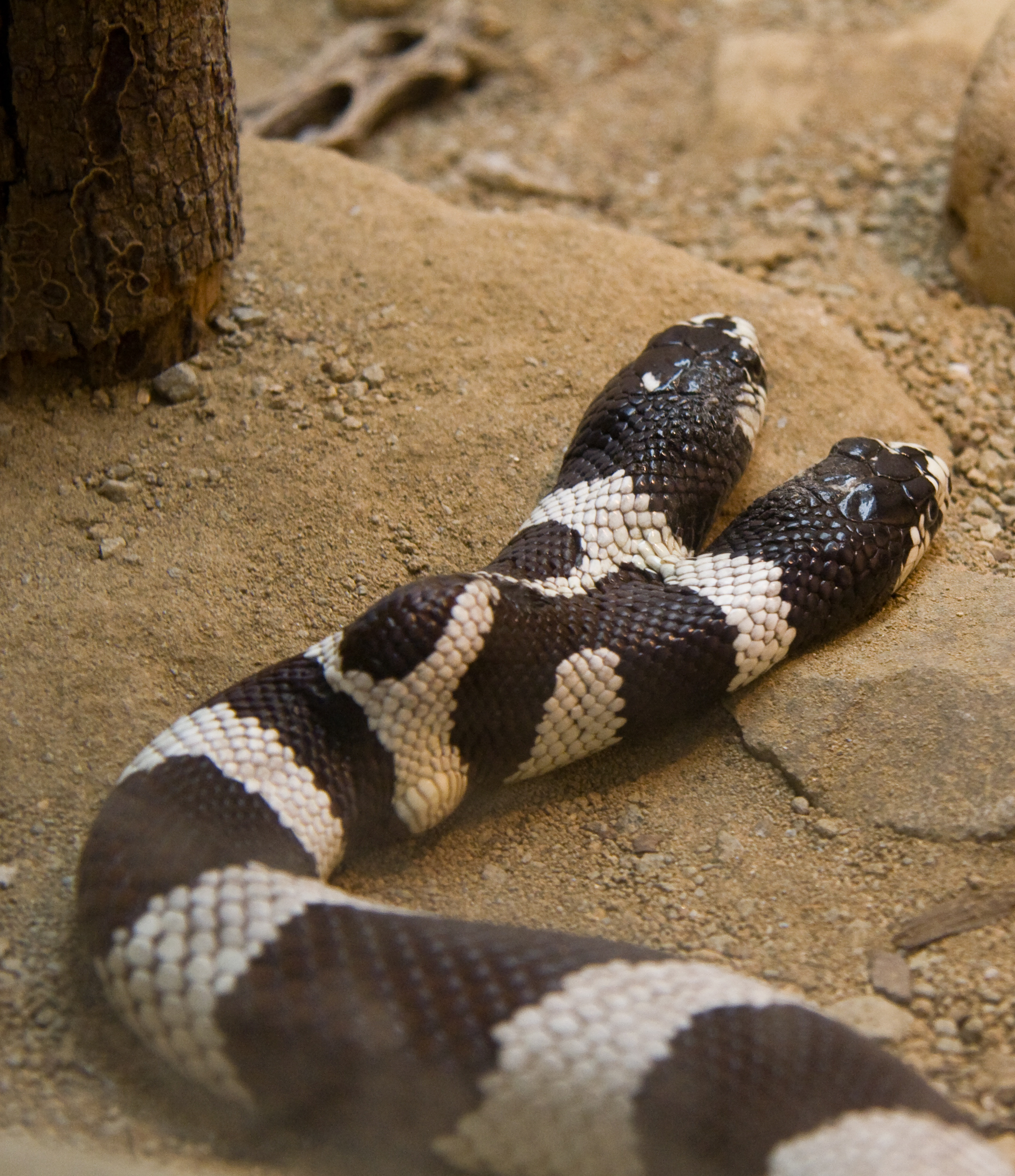
A California kingsnake with two heads

A two-headed California kingsnake raised to the age of seventeen at the Arizona State University reptile collection has gained some notoriety as a rare example of serpentine polycephaly. It was born in the wild within the vicinity of the South Mountain Park and Reserve in Arizona, until it was discovered beneath the toilet seat of a public restroom in the foothills of the park and relocated to ASU. This mutation was most likely the case of failed cell division during the process of producing twins.
