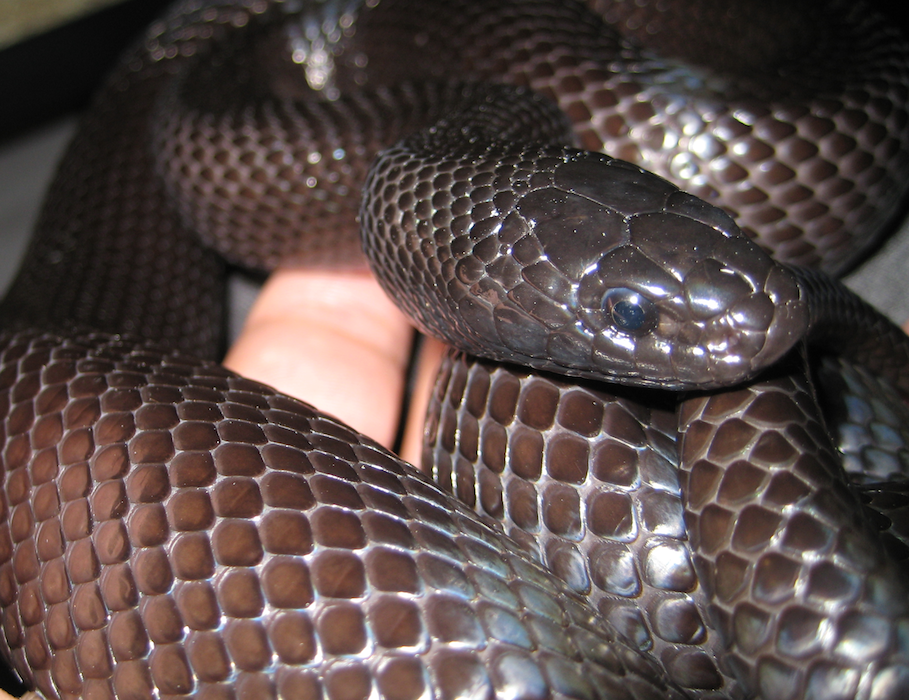

Scientific classification
- Kingdom: Animalia
- Phylum: Chordata
- Class: Reptilia
- Order: Squamata
- Suborder: Serpentes
- Family: Colubridae
- Genus: Lampropeltis
- Species: L. californiae
- Subspecies: L. c. nigrita

Trinomial name
- Lampropeltis californiae nigrita Zweifel and Norris, 1955

= Mexican black kingsnake =

Subspecies of snake

The Mexican black kingsnake (Lampropeltis nigrita) is part of the larger colubrid family of snakes, and a subspecies of the common kingsnake, which is debated by herpetologists to contain as many as 10 unique varieties. This species occupies rocky areas and places lush with vegetation in various regions of the Sonoran Desert, Northwestern Sinaloa, Mexico, and small parts of Arizona.

== Description ==
In the wild, most kingsnakes are moderately sized, reaching an average length of 90–120 centimeters (3–4.5 feet), and tend to be plump and stocky in girth. However, in captivity, some kingsnakes can exceed 1.5 meters (5 feet). This is most likely attributed to the larger and more stable diet they receive in captivity, compared to what they might receive in the wild. These snakes can weigh up to 1.3 kg (3lbs) as they reach adulthood (depending on their size), and can live anywhere between 20 and 30 years.

Juveniles sometimes carry small spots of white or yellow, particularly under their chin; however, those markings commonly either fade or disappear entirely as they mature. A full grown adult will usually have no discernible rings or other markings of any kind. It is, however, a common misconception that this subspecies of kingsnake is black in color. In reality, it is a deep, dark, chocolate color—something that is highly visible under direct light. The scales reflect a blue shimmer (pictured right).

Illustrating the high gloss shimmer of the snake's ventral scales.

== Range and habitat ==
This species occupies rocky areas and places lush with vegetation in various regions of the Sonora Desert, Northwestern Sinaloa, Mexico, and small parts of Arizona. Recent evidence suggests that species found within Arizona, despite their dark markings, are actually a cross between the Mexican black Kingsnake (Lampropeltisnigrita), the California kingsnake (Lampropeltis californiae), or the desert kingsnake (Lampropeltis splendida). The various kingsnakes in these areas often interbreed and are no longer considered "pure" Mexican black kingsnakes.

== Description and behaviour ==
Like all kingsnakes, the Mexican black kingsnake is a constrictor and is non-venomous. Their diet includes other snakes (ophiophagy) —particularly rattlesnakes which are also common to the region— and as a result, has developed a resilience to various kinds of venom. This species will also consume small rodents, lizards, birds, and eggs.

== Captivity ==
The Mexican black kingsnake is regularly kept as a pet; it is easy to care for and generally well natured. This species is active during the day and at night, though they tend to hunt during the daytime, as they rely on their (albeit limited) vision for predation. While their eyes do have severely limited acuity, their ability to detect movement is quite acute.
