= Oakland Independent =

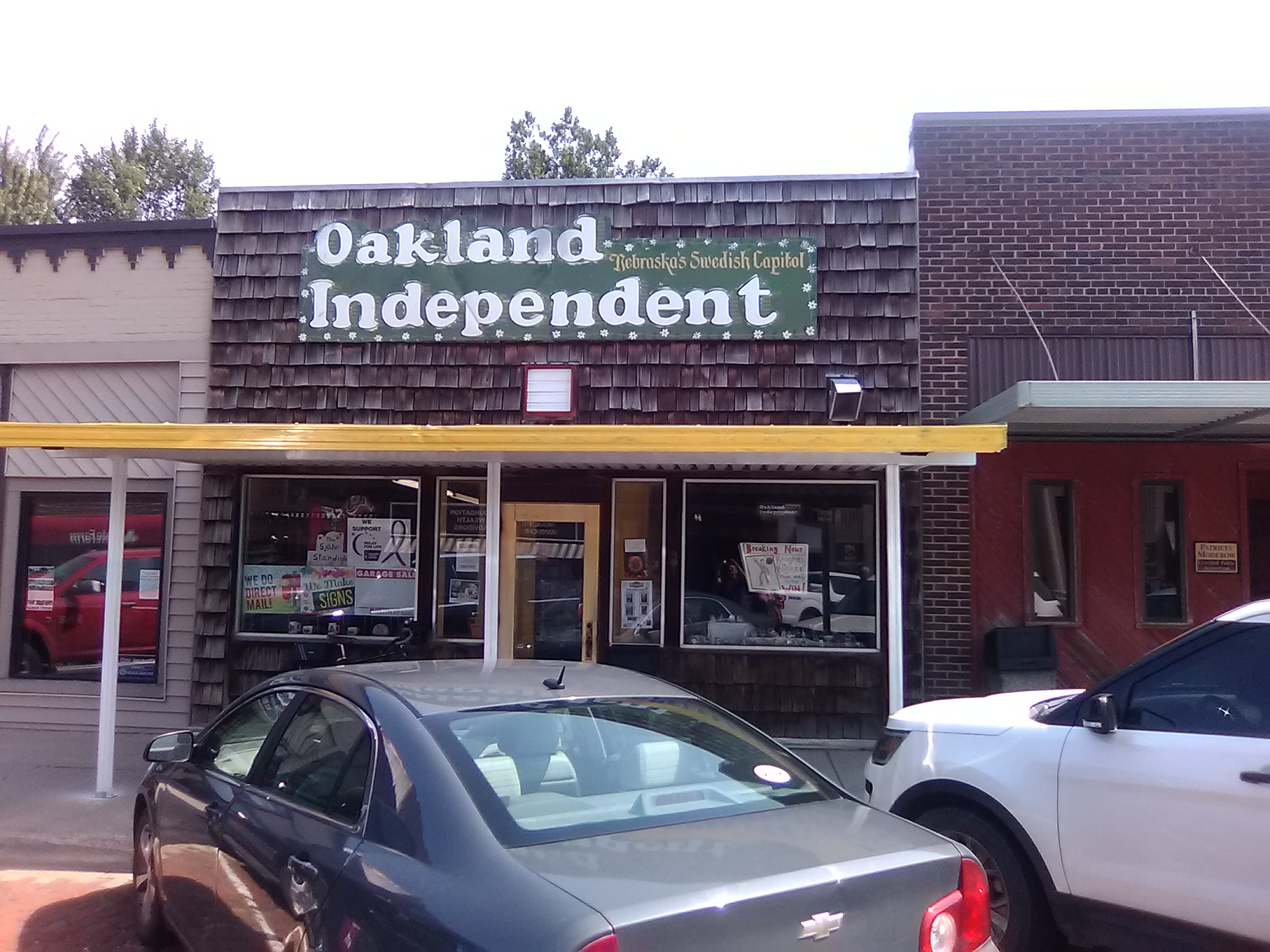
- Oakland Independent headquarters in Oakland
- Type: Weekly newspaper
- Format: Tabloid
- Owner: Carpenter Media Group
- Editor: Curt Hineline
- Founded: 1880
- Language: English
- Headquarters: 217 N. Oakland Ave. Oakland, Nebraska
- Circulation: 626
- OCLC number: 32864451
- Website: enterprisepub.com/burtcounty

The Oakland Independent is a weekly newspaper covering the town of Oakland, Nebraska and surrounding Burt County.

== History ==
The paper was founded in 1880. From 1907 to 1984, the paper was called Oakland Independent and Republican. In 2025, Enterprise Media Group of Blair, owned by Mark Rhoades, sold the paper to Carpenter Media Group.
