= Riverside Discovery Center =

- Interactive map of Riverside Discovery Center
- 41.8552°N 103.6841°W
- Location: Scottsbluff, Nebraska
- Land area: 23 acres (9.3 ha)
- No. of animals: 125+
- No. of species: 50+
- Website: www.riversidediscoverycenter.org

The Riverside Discovery Center, formerly named the Riverside Park and Zoo, is a park and zoo complex along the North Platte River in Scottsbluff, Nebraska, United States.

Riverside Park is Scottsbluff's city park, and has the only zoo in western Nebraska. It includes three lakes with camping and recreation areas, and a riverside trail that runs along the banks of the North Platte River. There are also over 30 garden spots. December 16, 2017 two brother grizzly bears went on exhibit. In the spring of 2017 their mother was illegally killed in Wyoming. State and Federal wildlife officials hoped the two orphaned cubs would survive in the wild without their mother. After several months on their own in the wild, the two cubs became increasingly habituated to humans for food. State and Federal wildlife officials were concerned about public safety and the well-being of the grizzly cubs. When it was evident the cubs were not going to survive in the wild on their own, State and Federal wildlife officials made the decision to capture the two cubs and try to find them a home. Riverside Discovery Center offered to assist in the rescue of the two cubs and to provide a new home for these two grizzly bear cubs.

Riverside Discovery Center was directly in the path of the August 21, 2017 total eclipse.

Riverside discovery center was not re-accredited by the AZA in September 2023.

== Animals ==
The Riverside Discovery Center has a collection of over 125 animals representing 50+ different species, in various exhibits.

=== North American Grasslands ===
Contains animals once common in the grasslands of North America:

- American bison (Bison bison)

=== Garden Walk ===
- Box turtle
- Greek tortoise
- African spurred tortoise
- Blue-and-yellow macaw

=== Slither Inn ===
mostly education animals behind the scenes

- Bearded dragon
- Boa constrictor
- Borneo python
- Grammostola pulchripes
- Mexican black kingsnake
- Uromastyx lizard
- Chinese water dragon

=== Raptor Row ===
Contains a collection of various raptors:

- Bald eagle (Haliaeetus leucocephalus)
- Turkey vulture (Cathartes aura)
- Swainson's hawk (Buteo swainsoni)
- Red Tailed Hawk
- Rough-legged Buzzard

=== Rainforest Discovery Center ===
An area dedicated to some of the smaller animals of the rainforest

- Waldrapp ibis (Geronticus eremita)
- Mission golden-eyed tree frog
- Squirrel Monkey
- Emerald Tree Boa

=== Chimpanzee Building ===
Home of the areas chimpanzee and other unique creatures:

- Chimpanzee
- Ball python
- Uromastyx
- Leopard Gecko

=== Cat Complex ===
Home to various big cats:

- Hyena
- Bobcat( Lynx rufus )

=== Primate Building ===
Contains a small collection of primates:

- Colombian spider monkey
- Chinchilla
- Red ruffed lemur

=== Zebra Circle ===
- Zebra
- Swift Fox
- Muntjac

=== Children's Zoo ===
- Donkey (Equus asinus)
- Pot-bellied pig
- Highland Cattle
- Wild Turkey (Meleagris gallopavo)

=== Pond ===
- Trumpeter Swan

=== Miscellaneous exhibits ===
There are other animals that are not included in any of the aforementioned exhibits:

- Grizzly Bear
- Marbled Fox
- Porcupine

== Conservation ==
The Riverside Discovery Center is actively involved in the Survival Species Program for various species of imperiled wildlife on display.

The zoo and park is located a half mile west of Nebraska Highway 71.
