= List of nature centers in Nebraska =

This is a list of nature centers and environmental education centers in the state of Nebraska.

To use the sortable tables: click on the icons at the top of each column to sort that column in alphabetical order; click again for reverse alphabetical order.

Name	Location	County	Region	Summary
Ak-Sar Ben Aquarium	Gretna	Sarpy	Eastern	Located in the 331-acre Schramm Park State Recreation Area, includes aquarium, terrarium, natural history classroom, fish hatchery museum
Crane Trust Nature & Visitor Center	Wood River	Hall	Central	website, also known as Nebraska Nature & Visitor Center, offers guided trips to view sandhill cranes from observation blinds on the banks of the Platte River
Fontenelle Forest Nature Center	Bellevue	Sarpy	Eastern	1,400-acre forest with 18 miles of trails
Hummel Park Nature Center	Omaha	Douglas	Eastern	202 acres, operated by the City
Neale Woods	Omaha	Douglas	Eastern	600 acres, operated by Fontenelle Forest Association, nature center open seasonally
Pioneers Park Nature Center	Lincoln	Lancaster	Eastern	668 acres, operated by the City
Prairie Loft	Hastings	Adams	Central	website, 8 acres, outdoor and agriculture learning center
River Country Nature Center	Nebraska City	Otoe	Eastern	website, exhibits of wildlife mounts and dioramas, education programs
Rowe Sanctuary	Gibbon	Buffalo	Central	website, 1,900 acres, operated by the National Audubon Society, features the Iain Nicolson Audubon Center, offers guided trips to view the world's largest concentration of sandhill cranes from observation blinds on the banks of the Platte River
Spring Creek Prairie Audubon Center	Denton	Lancaster	Eastern	808-acre tallgrass prairie nature preserve and education center, operated by the National Audubon Society
Wildcat Hills Nature Center	Gering	Scotts Bluff	Western	705 acres, operated by the Nebraska Game and Parks Commission

== Resources ==
- Nebraska Alliance for Conservation and Environmental Education
