= Hastings Museum =

History museum in Hastings, Nebraska, U.S.

- Established: 1926
- Location: 1330 N. Burlington Ave., Hastings, Nebraska, U.S.
- Coordinates: 40°36′00″N 98°23′29″W
- Type: Natural history, local history
- Website: hastingsmuseum.org

The Hastings Museum of Natural and Cultural History is located in Hastings, Nebraska, United States. The museum was founded in 1926 and moved to its current location in 1939. The museum exhibits include Kool-Aid, natural history dioramas, local history, weapons, life of pioneers on the Plains, rocks, minerals, fossils, antique vehicles, coins, and a planetarium.

== History ==
The Hastings Museum of Natural and Cultural History was formed in January 1926 and was unveiled in June 1926. It was formed following a collection by Adam Breede's public display of hunting trophies, which caused a surge in interest for the museum. The museum was originally located in a temporary location at the former Hawthorne School Building near South Lincoln Avenue.

While plans for a permanent museum were under discussion since its opening, it was not until June 1936 that plans for a new museum location were announced. The new museum would be built as a part of the Works Progress Administration program and it would contain about 40,000 square feet (3,700 m^{2}). The new museum was officially dedicated on June 15, 1939.

In 1941, the museum re-branded to the House of Yesterday. However, following confusion with the naming, the change was reverted in 1978. In 1993, the Lied IMAX Theater was built to the West side of the building. While anticipated to bring in more visitors, the theater underperformed in comparison to initial estimates.

== Collection ==
The Hastings Museum of Natural and Cultural History displays natural and cultural histories of Hastings, Adams County and the Great Plains of Nebraska. Founded in 1926 by Albert Brooking, it became home to his collection of Native American artifacts, fossils, and mounted birds. Albert Brookings’s bird collection was one of the largest in the United States. Other exhibits include natural history dioramas, an extensive armaments collection, and the history of Edwin Perkins, a local merchant famous for inventing Kool-Aid in 1927. The museum hosts an annual Native American festival. The Hastings Public Library and Adams County Historical Society are both at the museum.

== Governance ==
The Museum is under the jurisdiction of the City of Hastings and all employees are personnel of the Hastings government. The museum is governed by a 7-member board, with each member serving a term of 5 years. The board has the power to adopt rulesand it has control of the Museum funds. The board is responsible to the Mayor and City Council of Hastings, Nebraska. It is also supported by a Foundation to increase awareness and support, which was incorporated in 1985.

== See also ==
- List of museums in Nebraska
- Pioneer Village, located about 30 miles west in Minden, Nebraska.
- Nebraska Prairie Museum, located about 55 miles west in Holdrege, Nebraska.
- Stuhr Museum in Grand Island, Nebraska
