= Oakland, Nebraska =

- City
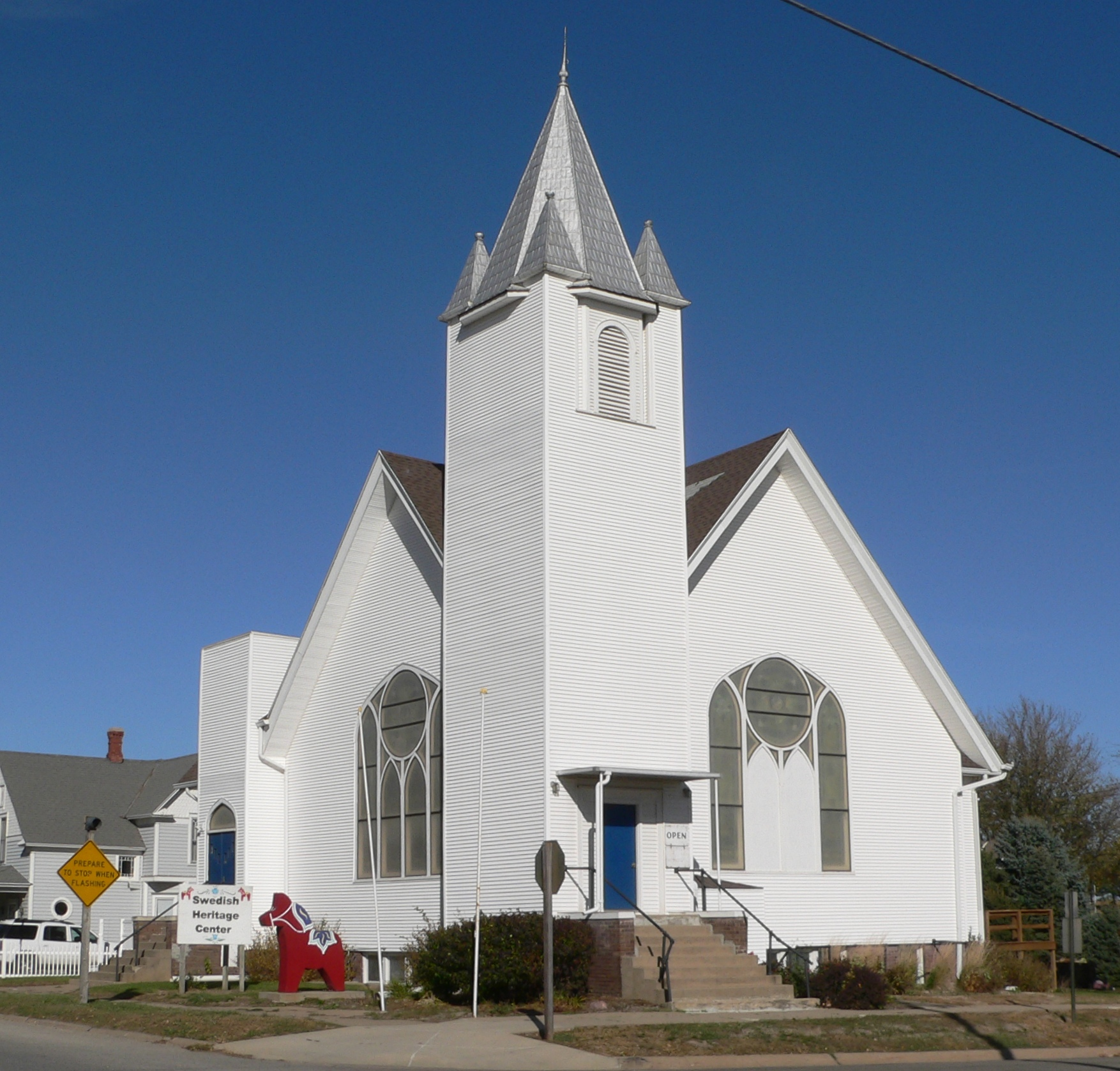
- Swedish Heritage Center, occupying former Swedish Covenant Church in Oakland

- Location of Oakland, Nebraska
- Coordinates: 41°50′08″N 96°28′01″W
- Country: United States
- State: Nebraska
- County: Burt

Area
  - Total: 0.95 sq mi (2.46 km^{2})
  - Land: 0.95 sq mi (2.46 km^{2})
  - Water: 0 sq mi (0.00 km^{2})
- Elevation: 1,293 ft (394 m)

Population (2020)
  - Total: 1,369
  - Density: 1,443.2/sq mi (557.21/km^{2})
- Time zone: UTC-6 (Central (CST))
  - Summer (DST): UTC-5 (CDT)
- ZIP code: 68045
- Area code: 402
- FIPS code: 31-35490
- GNIS feature ID: 838169
- Website: ci.oakland.ne.us

Oakland is a city in Burt County, Nebraska, United States. As of the 2020 census, Oakland had a population of 1,369. The city considers itself "the Swedish capital of Nebraska"

== Geography ==
According to the United States Census Bureau, the city has a total area of 0.93 square miles (2.41 km^{2}), all land.

== History ==
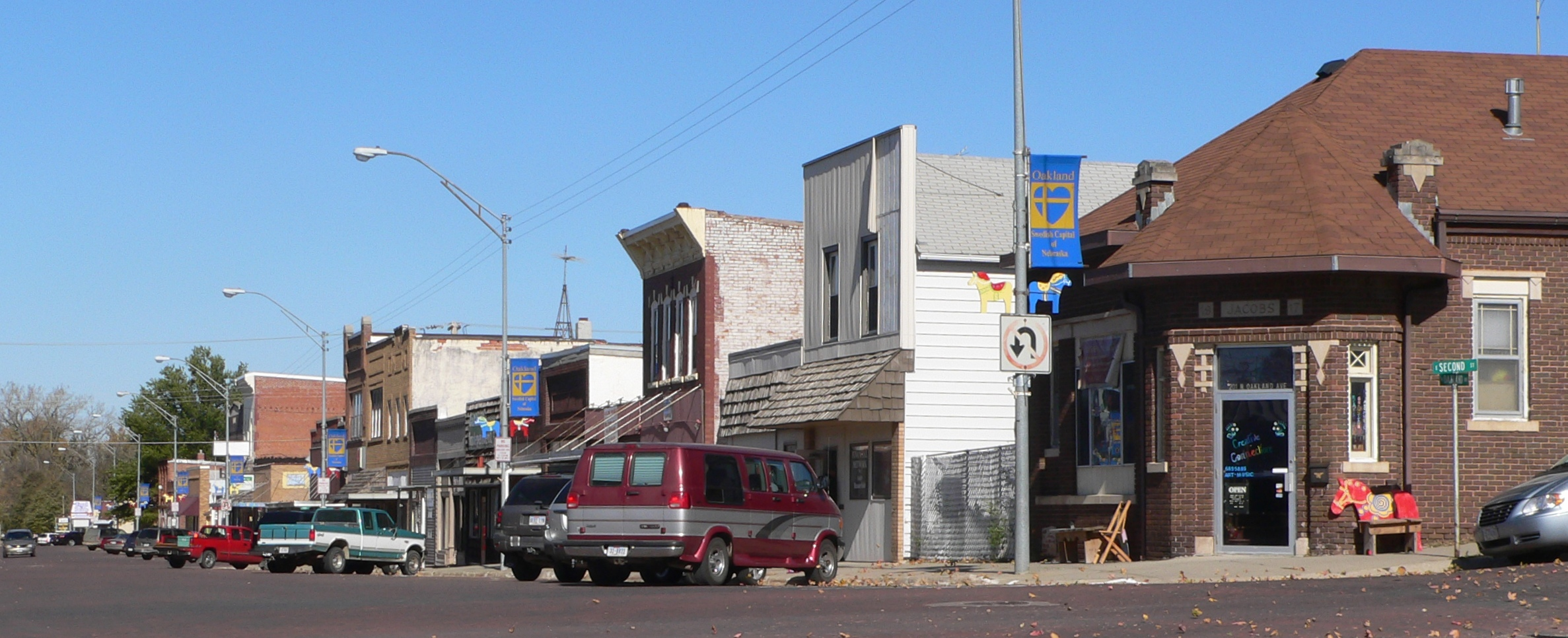
Downtown Oakland

John Oak, an early settler, is the place's namesake.

The Oakland Independent newspaper was established in the 1880s. Oakland-Craig Public School is shared with the nearby village of Craig, Nebraska.

Oakland was home to the Swedish Basketball Classic from 1993 to 2006, which has since moved to Midland University in Fremont and changed its name to the Warrior Classic. Oakland has also been home to the Burt County Fair since 1913.

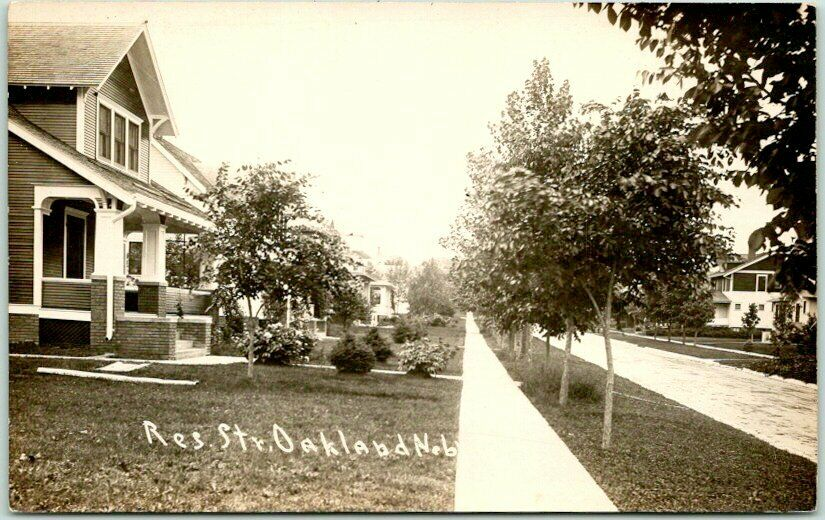
A residential street in Oakland, Nebraska c. 1920

== Demographics ==
Historical population
Census	Pop.	Note	%±
1880	345		—
1890	807		133.9%
1900	1,008		24.9%
1910	1,073		6.4%
1920	1,356		26.4%
1930	1,433		5.7%
1940	1,380		−3.7%
1950	1,456		5.5%
1960	1,429		−1.9%
1970	1,355		−5.2%
1980	1,393		2.8%
1990	1,279		−8.2%
2000	1,367		6.9%
2010	1,244		−9.0%
2020	1,369		10.0%
U.S. Decennial Census

=== 2010 census ===
As of the census of 2010, there were 1,244 people, 528 households, and 343 families living in the city. The population density was 1,337.6 inhabitants per square mile (516.5/km^{2}). There were 633 housing units at an average density of 680.6 per square mile (262.8/km^{2}). The racial makeup of the city was 96.0% White, 0.5% African American, 1.3% Native American, 0.9% Asian, and 1.4% from two or more races. Hispanic or Latino of any race were 0.6% of the population.

There were 528 households, of which 28.2% had children under the age of 18 living with them, 54.2% were married couples living together, 7.6% had a female householder with no husband present, 3.2% had a male householder with no wife present, and 35.0% were non-families. 33.0% of all households were made up of individuals, and 20% had someone living alone who was 65 years of age or older. The average household size was 2.28 and the average family size was 2.85.

The median age in the city was 44.9 years. 25.2% of residents were under the age of 18; 3.2% were between the ages of 18 and 24; 21.6% were from 25 to 44; 25.7% were from 45 to 64; and 24.2% were 65 years of age or older. The gender makeup of the city was 48.9% male and 51.1% female.

=== 2000 census ===
As of the census of 2000, there were 1,367 people, 565 households, and 371 families living in the city. The population density was 1,695.3 inhabitants per square mile (654.6/km^{2}). There were 623 housing units at an average density of 772.6 per square mile (298.3/km^{2}). The racial makeup of the city was 98.68% White, 0.22% Native American, 0.15% Asian, and 0.95% from two or more races. Hispanic or Latino of any race were 0.73% of the population.

There were 565 households, out of which 25.8% had children under the age of 18 living with them, 58.4% were married couples living together, 5.7% had a female householder with no husband present, and 34.2% were non-families. 32.7% of all households were made up of individuals, and 23.2% had someone living alone who was 65 years of age or older. The average household size was 2.32 and the average family size was 2.94.

In the city, the population was spread out, with 24.2% under the age of 18, 5.0% from 18 to 24, 21.4% from 25 to 44, 20.9% from 45 to 64, and 28.5% who were 65 years of age or older. The median age was 45 years. For every 100 females, there were 84.5 males. For every 100 females age 18 and over, there were 80.5 males.

As of 2000 the median income for a household in the city was $32,663, and the median income for a family was $42,938. Males had a median income of $31,600 versus $19,583 for females. The per capita income for the city was $16,916. About 3.8% of families and 6.2% of the population were below the poverty line, including 3.2% of those under age 18 and 9.1% of those age 65 or over.

== Notable people ==
Oakland is the birthplace of Jon Kyl, U.S. Senator from Arizona, and Curt Bromm, the former Speaker of the Nebraska Legislature.
