= Dr. W.C. Wightman House =

Historic house in Nebraska, United States

- Dr. W. C. Wightman House
- U.S. National Register of Historic Places
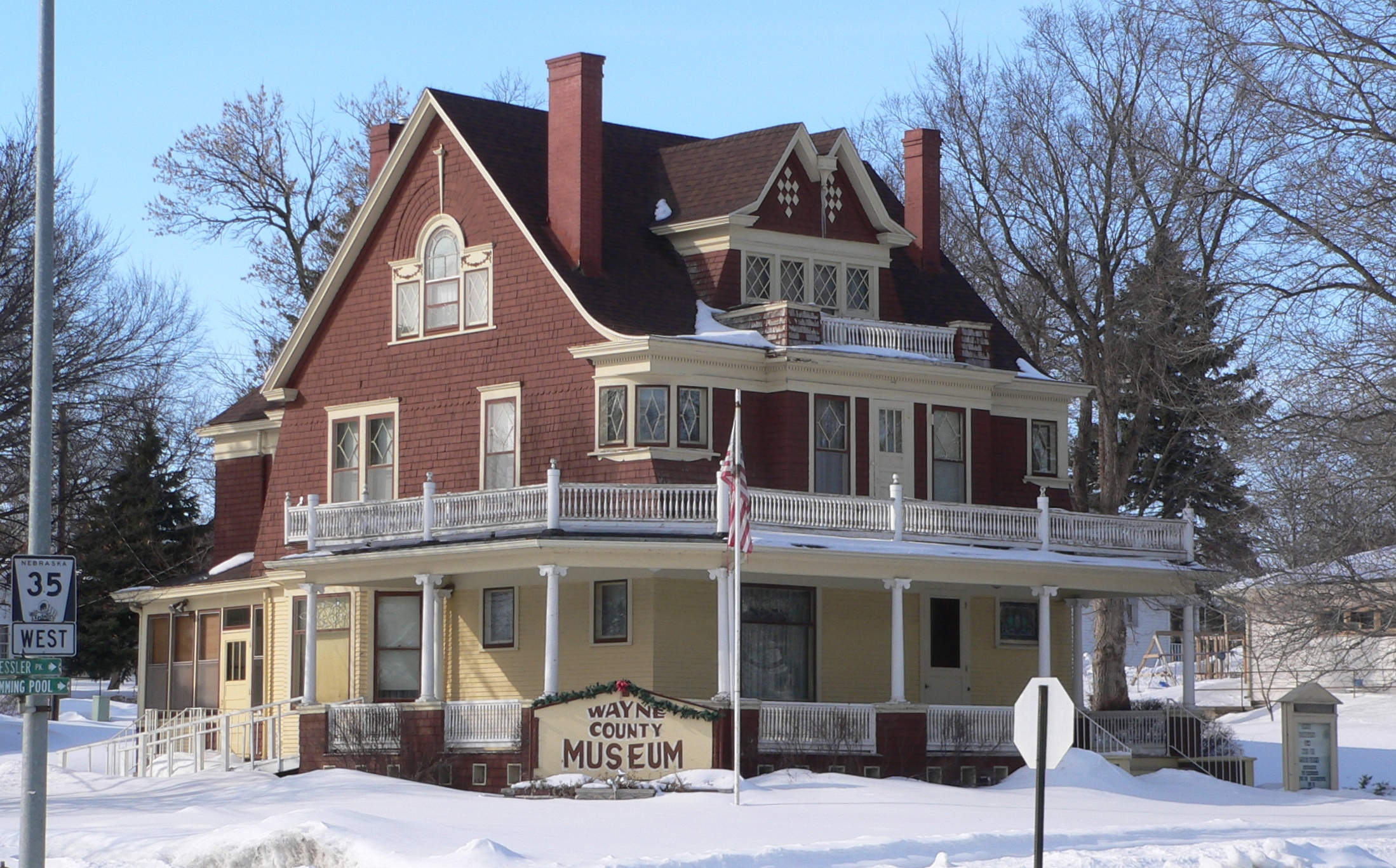

- Location within Nebraska Location within the United States
- Location: 702 Lincoln St., Wayne, Nebraska
- Coordinates: 42°14′9″N 97°1′15″W
- Area: less than one acre
- Built: 1900
- Architectural style: Shingle Style
- NRHP reference No.: 78001717
- Added to NRHP: June 13, 1978

The Dr. W. C. Wightman House in Wayne, Nebraska was built in Shingle Style in 1900. Also known as the Rollie W. Ley House and as the Wightman-Ley House, it is a two-and-a-half-story house with a large porch around two sides of its first story. It was listed on the National Register of Historic Places in 1978.

It was built for Dr. W. C. Wightman, a doctor for the Union Pacific Railroad Company. Wightman moved to California in 1912 and sold the home to Rollie W. Ley. Ley worked his way up from clerk at the Wayne State National Bank (in 1899) to become president and chairman of the bank's board (in 1924).

The house was deemed in its NRHP nomination to be "a fine example of the Shingle Style mode of architecture. Though a vernacular version of the style, this house has many characteristic features, such as the shingled upper floors over the clapboarded first floor, Palladian windows in the gables, elaborate wood paneled entry hall with window seat, fireplace and winding staircase, the generally open floor plan and the exquisite parquette flooring on first floor. Modest examples of this style which utilized more obvious classical motifs were more popular in Nebraska than the fully developed mode."

In 1978 the house was under restoration by the Wayne County Historical Society.

In 2010 the house served as the Wayne County Museum.
