= Brantly Sturdevant House =

Historic house in Nebraska, United States

- U.S. National Register of Historic Places
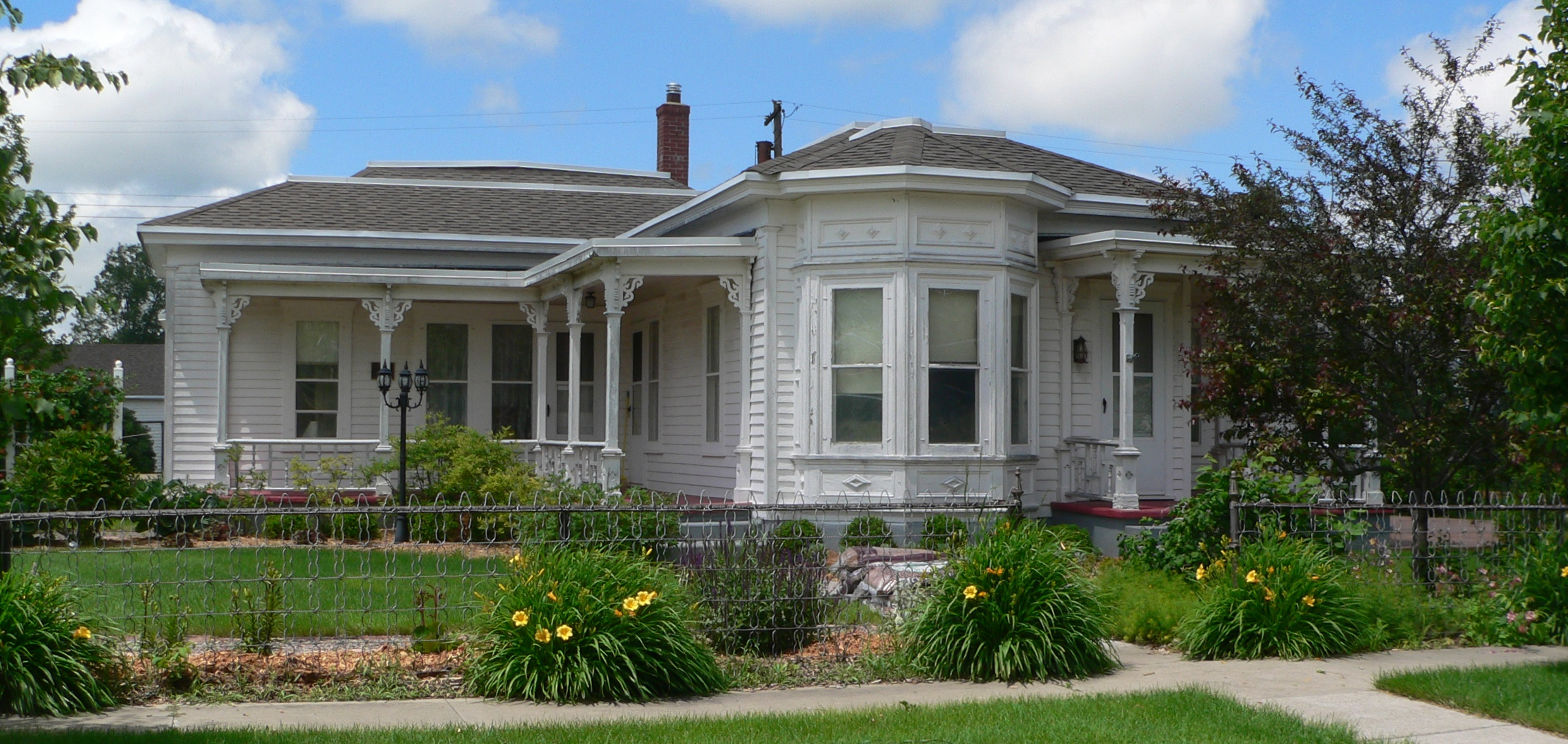

- Location within Nebraska Location within the United States
- Location: 308 S. Main St., Atkinson, Nebraska
- Coordinates: 42.5288°N 98.97857°W
- Area: less than one acre
- Built: 1887
- Architectural style: Queen Anne
- NRHP reference No.: 99000387
- Added to NRHP: March 25, 1999

The Brantly Sturdevant House, located at 308 S. Main St. in Atkinson, Nebraska, is a historic Queen Anne style house that was built in 1887, which is operated as Sturdevant-McKee Museum. It has been designated NeHBS No. HT02-042. It was listed on the National Register of Historic Places in 1999. The listing included three contributing buildings.

Its NRHP nomination argued that it was historically significant for association with Brantly Sturdevant, who was born in Pennsylvania in 1852 and came to Nebraska with his parents and family in 1871. He came to Atkinson in 1885. The house was built in 1887 and remained in the Sturdevant family to 1977.
