= Spring Creek Prairie Audubon Center =

- Location within Nebraska
- Location: Lancaster County, Nebraska
- Nearest city: Denton
- Coordinates: 40°41′37″N 96°51′17″W
- Area: 808 acres (327 ha)
- Established: 1998
- Website: springcreekprairie.audubon.org

Spring Creek Prairie Audubon Center is an 850-acre (340 ha) tallgrass prairie nature preserve located southwest of Lincoln, Nebraska near Denton. Established in 1998, it is home to 222 bird species, 30 mammal species, 53 butterfly species, 35, dragonfly/damselfly species, and over 370 plants. Roughly three miles of walking trails run through the prairie. 19th-century wagon ruts from the Nebraska City-Fort Kearny Cutoff to the Oregon Trail can be observed.

An education building opened in 2006, employing many green features.
