= Fraternal Hall (Kimball, Nebraska) =

- U.S. National Register of Historic Places
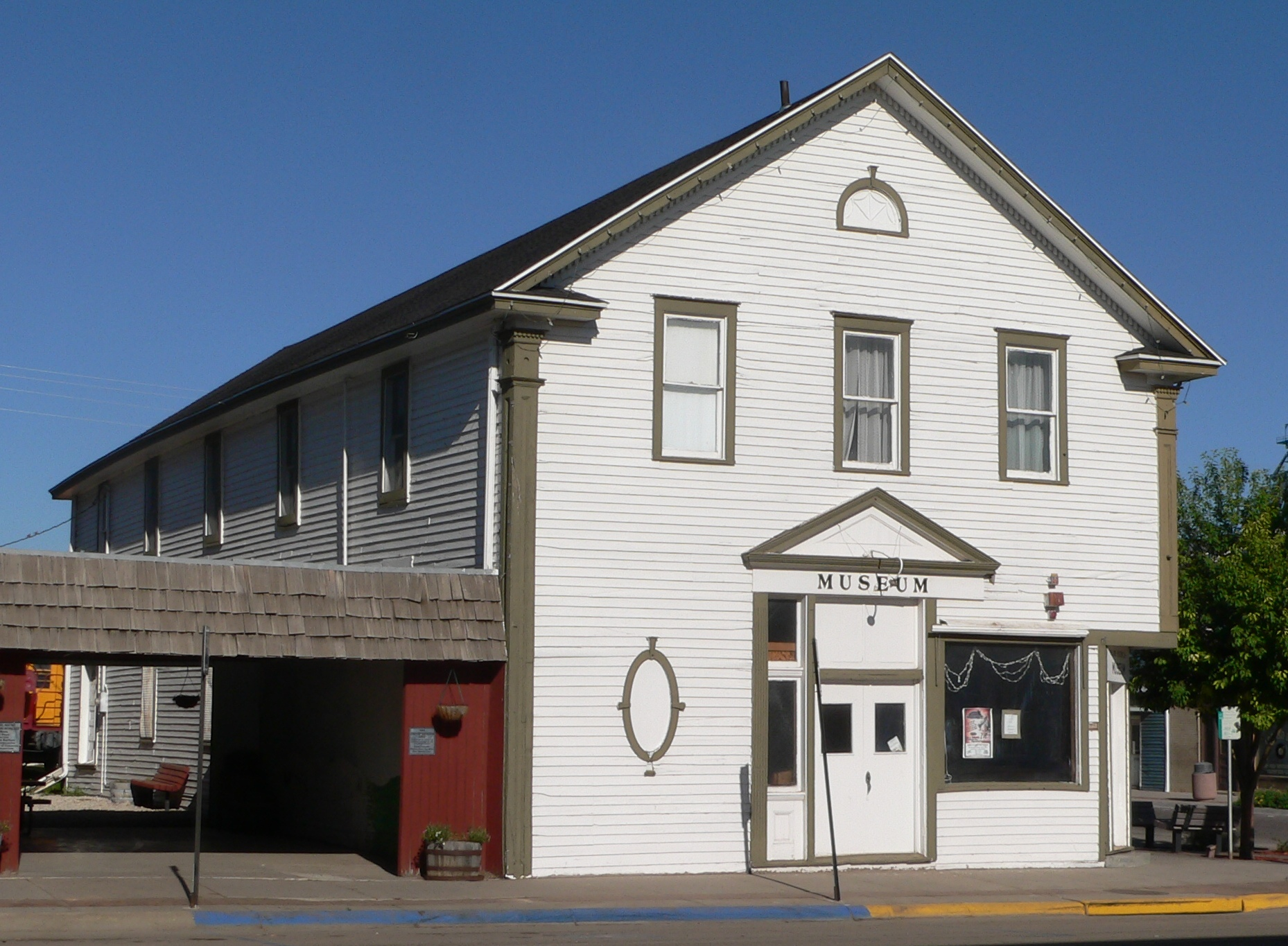
- Building in 2010

- Location within Nebraska Location within the United States
- Location: 2nd and Chestnut Sts., Kimball, Nebraska
- Coordinates: 41°14′13″N 103°39′46″W
- Area: less than one acre
- Built: 1903-04
- Architectural style: Classical Revival
- NRHP reference No.: 83001096
- Added to NRHP: February 28, 1983

The Fraternal Hall, at 2nd and Chestnut Sts. in Kimball, Nebraska, was built in 1903–04. It includes Classical Revival architecture. It is now operated as Plains Historical Museum.

The building was listed on the National Register of Historic Places in 1983. It was deemed significant as "the only prototype of an academic architectural style in Kimball County." It served three fraternal lodge chapters: of Knights of Pythias, of Woodmen, and of Royal Neighbors of America that joined together to create a new building, when the lease they had shared for a previous space was running out.
