= Cornelius O'Connor House =

Historic house in Nebraska, United States

- U.S. National Register of Historic Places
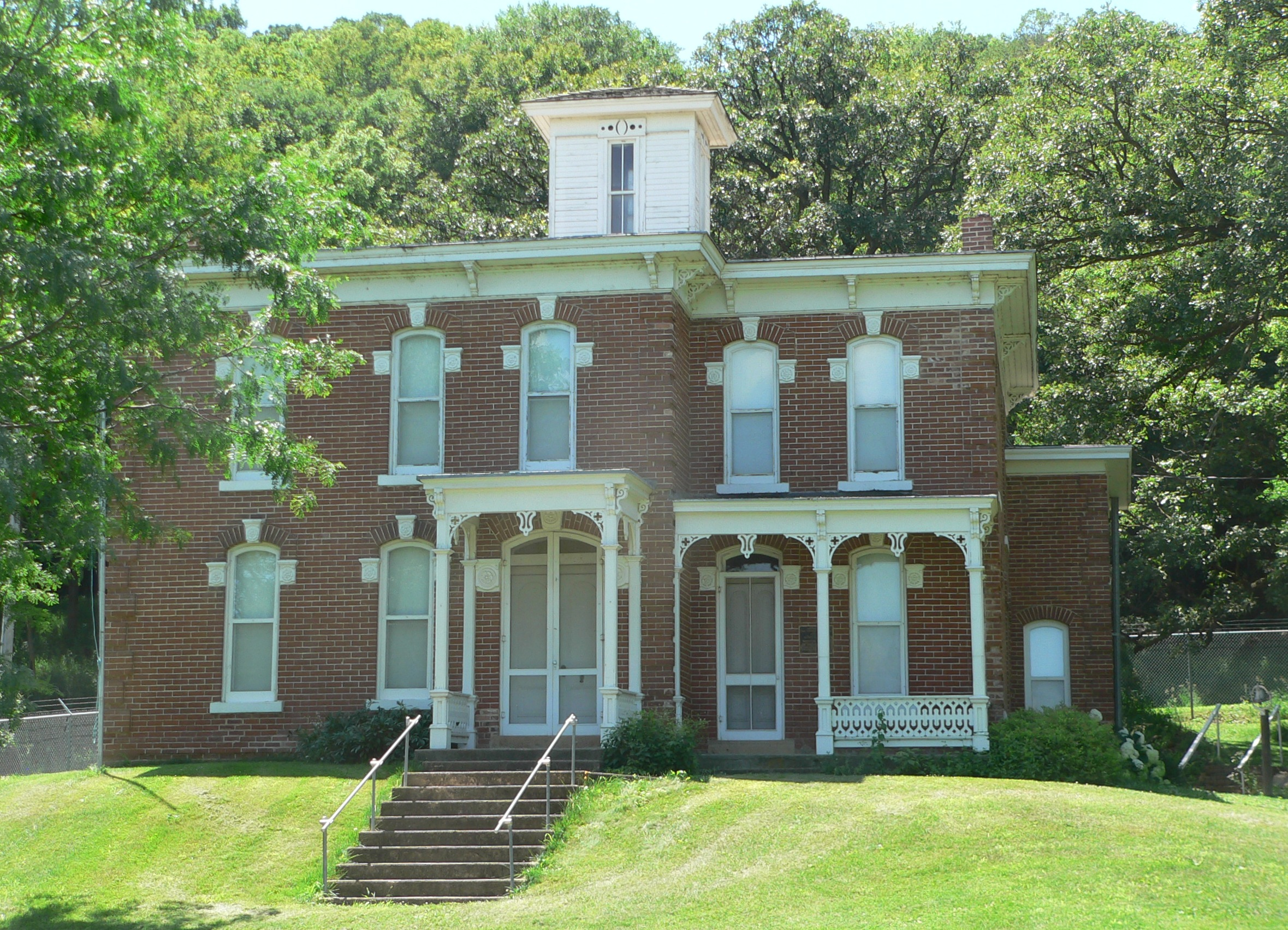

- Location within Nebraska Location within the United States
- Nearest city: Homer, Nebraska
- Coordinates: 42°18′40″N 96°27′43″W
- Area: less than one acre
- Built: 1875
- Built by: Cornelius O'Connor
- Architectural style: Vernacular Italianate
- NRHP reference No.: 77000826
- Added to NRHP: November 23, 1977

The Cornelius O'Connor House near Homer, Nebraska, United States, was built in 1875. It was listed on the National Register of Historic Places in 1977.

The house is owned by the Dakota County Historical Society and is open in the summer or by appointment.
