= Frank H. Woods Telephone Pioneer Museum =

- Established: 1996
- Dissolved: 29 July 2018
- Location: 2047 M Street; Lincoln, Nebraska
- Coordinates: 40°48′40″N 96°41′27″W
- Type: Telecommunications museum

The Frank H. Woods Telephone Pioneer Museum was a telecommunications museum in Lincoln, Nebraska, that operated from 1996 to 2018. Located at 2047 M Street, the museum preserved and interpreted the history of telephony in Nebraska through a collection of telephones, switchboards, photographs, documents, and other telecommunications artifacts. Much of the collection related to the Lincoln Telephone & Telegraph Company (LT&T), which played a central role in the development of telephone service throughout the state. The museum was named for LT&T founder Frank H. Woods and was featured in the 2008 film Yes Man.

Although the museum itself opened in 1996, its collection traced its origins to the late 1920s, when LT&T began preserving examples of early telephone equipment for public display. Over the following decades, the collection grew through donations and preservation efforts before becoming the Frank H. Woods Telephone Pioneer Museum. After the museum closed in 2018, the collection was acquired by Speedway Properties and Nelnet and later became part of the Telegraph Museum in Lincoln's Telegraph District.

== History ==
=== Origins of the Collection (1920s-1979) ===
The collection that would eventually become the Frank H. Woods Telephone Pioneer Museum began in the late 1920s as LT&T prepared to mark its twenty-fifth anniversary. According to company accounts, publicity director C. W. "Red" Motter assembled a display of historic telephones and related equipment for a series of public exhibitions. Many of the items gathered for those exhibits were later donated, forming the foundation of a collection that continued to expand for decades.

Throughout the mid-twentieth century, artifacts from the collection were displayed at fairs, expositions, company open houses, and community events across Nebraska. These exhibits highlighted both the technological development of the telephone and the growth of communications networks throughout the region.

=== Permanent Exhibit at LT&T headquarters (1979-1996) ===
In 1979, the collection was installed as a permanent exhibit in the eighth-floor auditorium of LT&T's headquarters at Fifteenth and M Streets in downtown Lincoln. Maintained largely by company employees and retirees, the exhibit provided a permanent home for artifacts documenting the history of telecommunications in Nebraska.

Over time, the collection expanded to include a wide range of telephones, switchboards, tools, photographs, documents, and other materials related to the operation and evolution of telephone service in the state. Company publications in the early 1980s described it as one of the region's most extensive telecommunications history collections.

=== Establishment of the Museum ===
The Frank H. Woods Telephone Pioneer Museum opened in October 1996 after the collection was relocated to 2047 M Street. The project was supported by a $40,000 grant from the Independent Telephone Pioneers Association as well as funding from Aliant Communications.

Planning records indicate that organizers intended the museum to present a broader story of the telephone industry, tracing developments in telecommunications technology from the nineteenth century through the modern era.

In 1998, ownership of the collection was formally transferred from the local Independent Telephone Pioneers Association chapter to the museum organization.

=== Operations and Exhibits ===
The museum's holdings included telephones, switchboards, telecommunications equipment, photographs, documents, and other artifacts illustrating the history of telephone service in Nebraska. Exhibits placed particular emphasis on the history of LT&T and the expansion of telecommunications infrastructure across the state.

The museum operated on a limited public schedule and by appointment. Its collections were used by local historians, researchers, former telecommunications employees, and members of the public interested in the history of communications technology.

=== Closure ===
The museum's future became uncertain in 2016 when redevelopment plans for Lincoln's Telegraph District included the property occupied by the museum. Windstream, which owned the site, announced that the museum's lease would eventually end as redevelopment moved forward.

Efforts to preserve the collection and identify a new home involved city officials, museum supporters, and community volunteers. Mayor Chris Beutler participated in discussions regarding relocation options, and a committee was formed to explore possible solutions.

Students in the University of Nebraska–Lincoln College of Architecture also prepared conceptual designs for a future museum facility as part of a class project.

Despite these efforts, the museum closed permanently on July 29, 2018.

== Legacy and Telegraph Museum ==
Following the closure of the Frank H. Woods Telephone Pioneer Museum in July 2018, the museum's collection was acquired by Speedway Properties and Nelnet after redevelopment of Lincoln's Telegraph District.

The collection was subsequently reorganized into the Telegraph Museum, a series of public displays located within Telegraph Lofts East and Telegraph Lofts West. These exhibits preserve and interpret portions of the former museum's holdings, continuing public access to the collection assembled over nearly a century.

The Telegraph Museum serves as the present-day steward of much of the collection formerly housed at the Frank H. Woods Telephone Pioneer Museum.
