= Captain Meriwether Lewis =

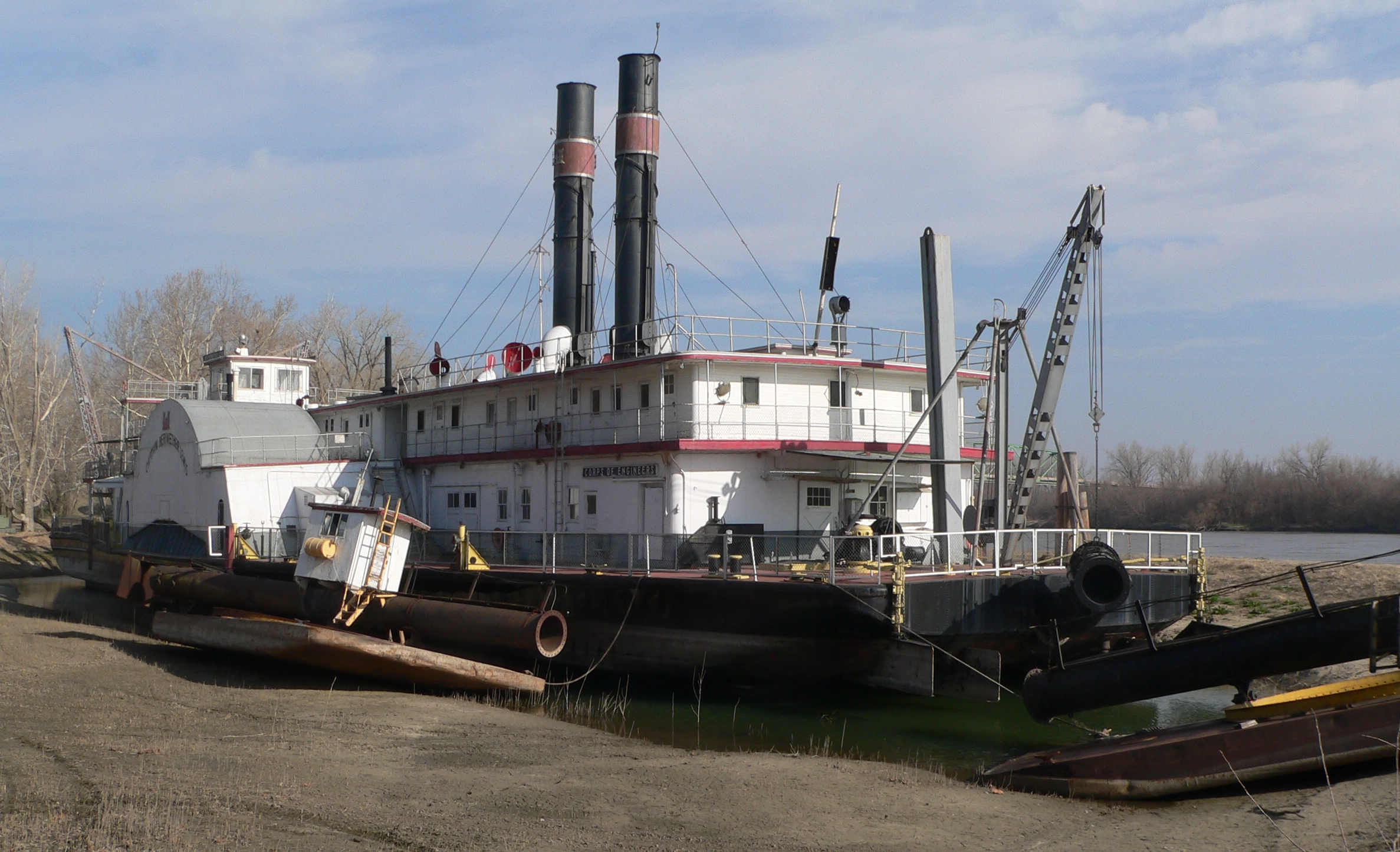

History

United States
- Owner: US Army Corps of Engineers 1931–1976; Nebraska State Historical Society 1976–
- Builder: Marietta Manufacturing Co.
- Launched: 12 December 1931
- Completed: 1932
- Out of service: 1976
- Status: Museum ship

General characteristics
- Length: 268 ft 11 1/2 in (82 m)
- Installed power: 2 × oil-fired Foster-Wheeler boilers; 2 × steam engines (paddlewheels); 1 × 1,300 hp (970 kW) triple-expansion steam pumping engine
- Propulsion: Side paddlewheel (maneuvering); 2 × deck gypsies (dredging)
- Crew: 52
- Captain Meriwether Lewis (Dredge)
- U.S. National Register of Historic Places
- U.S. National Historic Landmark
- Location within Nebraska Location within the United States
- Nearest city: Brownville, Nebraska
- Coordinates: 40°23′41″N 95°39′2″W
- NRHP reference No.: 77000833

Significant dates
- Added to NRHP: October 28, 1977
- Designated NHL: April 11, 1989

The dredge Captain Meriwether Lewis is a U.S. National Historic Landmark. The dredge is one of the few surviving examples of its type built to control flooding and improve navigation along the nation's rivers.

== History ==
Built by the Marietta Manufacturing Company in Point Pleasant, West Virginia, Captain Meriwether Lewis was launched on December 12, 1931 while only half-complete by the U.S. Army Corps of Engineers. The Corps completed construction the following year.

This side-wheel steam paddle dredge was operated by the U.S. Army Corps of Engineers to help channel the Missouri River and to maintain it as a navigable waterway.

This massive vessel, at a length of 268' 11-1/2", housed a standard operating crew of 52, with quarters available for 58 men. Captain Meriwether Lewis could dig to a depth of 20 feet at an average speed of 150–200 feet per hour, all powered by the 25-foot steam-propelled paddle wheels. With all three steam engines running, the dredge burned up to 6,000 gallons of oil in a day.

The Babcock & Wilcox marine boilers could produce up to 40,000 pounds of steam or more per hour when dredging. The triple expansion engine that drives the pump turbine is rated at 1,300 hp. The dredge was pulled forward by the two deck gypsies and not propelled by the paddlewheels when dredging.

In 1976, Captain Meriwether Lewis was given to the Nebraska State Historical Society and moved to Brownville one year later. It was dry-berthed along the Missouri River where it remains today.

Captain Meriwether Lewis was designated a National Historic Landmark in 1989. Today, Captain Meriwether Lewis houses the Museum of Missouri River History, where exhibits from Native American history to exploration and westward expansion can be seen. Visitors can also learn about the vessel and its role in improving navigation on the Missouri River.

== Museum of Missouri River History ==
The Nebraska State Historical Society took possession of the ship in 1976 and moved it to Brownville, Nebraska the next year. The ship is dry-berthed along the Missouri River. Visitors can tour the ship, which includes the Museum of Missouri River History, opened in 1981. The museum's exhibits are located in several rooms of the boiler deck. Exhibits include Native American history, area exploration, westward expansion, the ship and navigation on the river.

== See also ==
- List of U.S. National Historic Landmark ships, shipwrecks, and shipyards
