= Fred and Minnie Meyer Sudman House =

Historic house in Nebraska, United States

- U.S. National Register of Historic Places
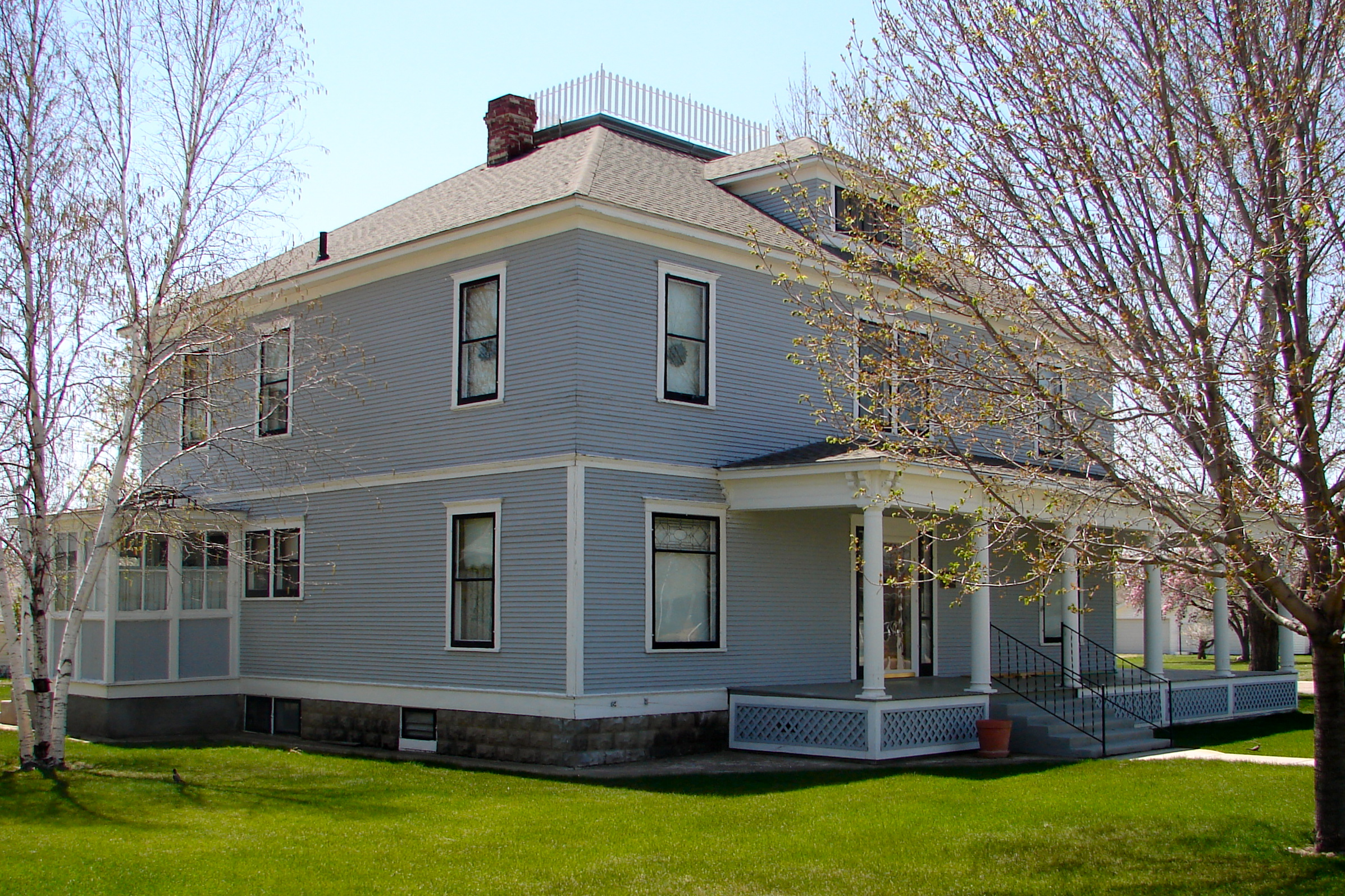
- Photo in 2011

- Location within Nebraska
- Location: 490 Vincent Ave., Chappell, Nebraska
- Coordinates: 41°5′44″N 102°28′18″W
- Area: less than one acre
- Built: 1911
- Architect: Dickmeyer, Henry
- Architectural style: Renaissance
- NRHP reference No.: 90001770
- Added to NRHP: 6 December 1990

The Fred and Minnie Meyer Sudman House, located at 490 Vincent Ave. in Chappell, Nebraska, is a historic house (built 1911) that is a notable local landmark. It is a 42-by-36-foot (13 m × 11 m) wood-frame house on a concrete masonry foundation. It is described as a "two-story, symmetrical, central hall, double-pile house," but having a plan that "incorporates spatial design usually reserved for high-style dwellings." It is known to have been built by contractor Henry Dickmeyer, but details of its designer are lost.

It was listed on the National Register of Historic Places in 1990. At the time of its NRHP listing, it was noted that a widow's walk that was "originally located on the truncation of the hip roof" had been removed, and accompanying 1988 photos showed no such walk; the photo in 2011 suggests that it has since been restored.

It has also been designated as NEHBS # DU02-2.

The house has now been restored to an early 20th-century appearance and is operated as the Sudman-Neumann Heritage House Museum.
