= Swedish Heritage Center =

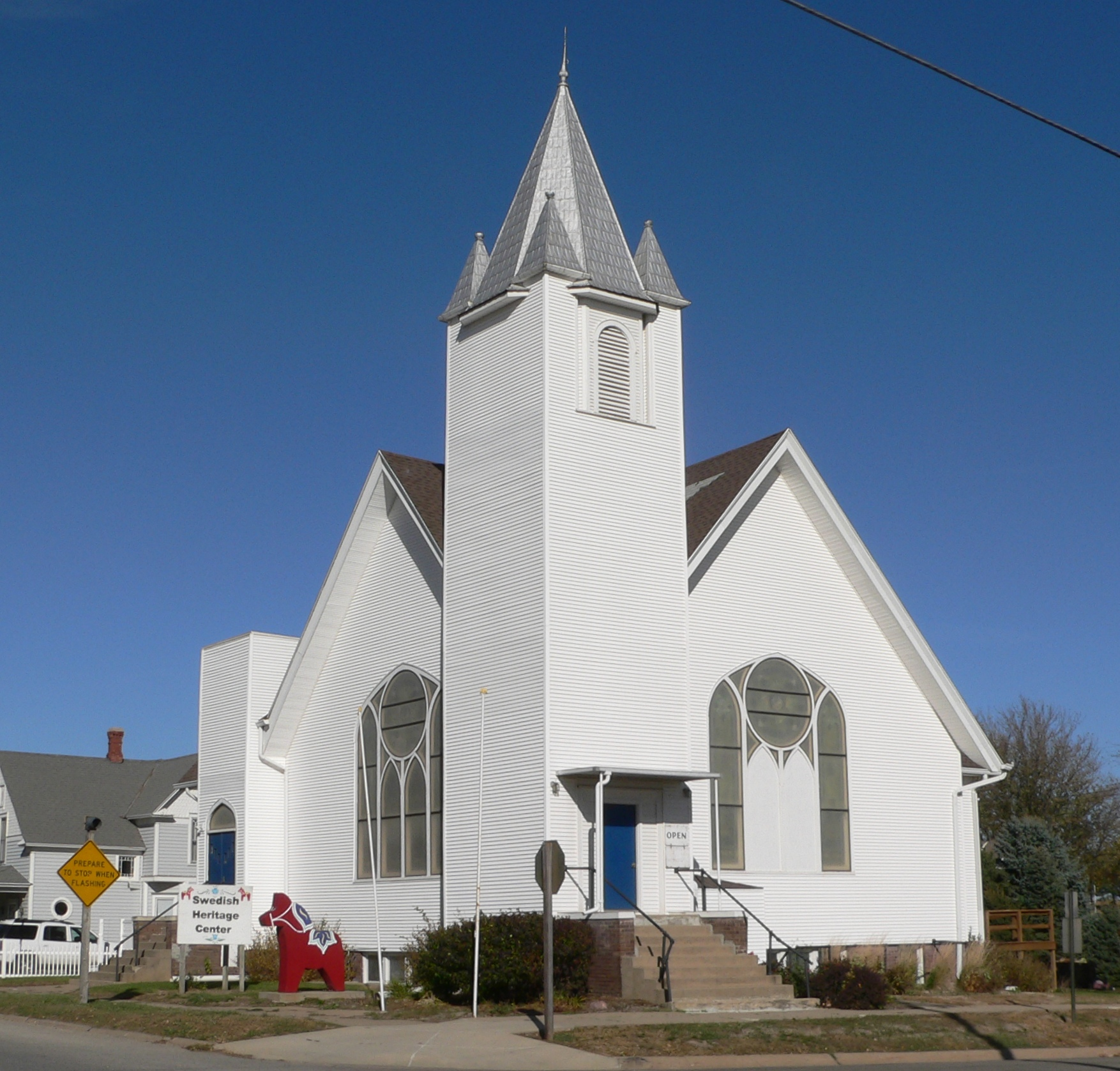
- Established: 1989
- Location: 301 N. Charde; Oakland, Nebraska
- Coordinates: 41°50′09″N 96°27′47″W

The Swedish Heritage Center is a museum of Swedish memorabilia located at 301 N. Charde in Oakland, Nebraska. The museum displays artifacts brought by Swedish pioneers, including Swedish crystal, linens, and needlework.

== See also ==
- Swedes in Omaha, Nebraska
