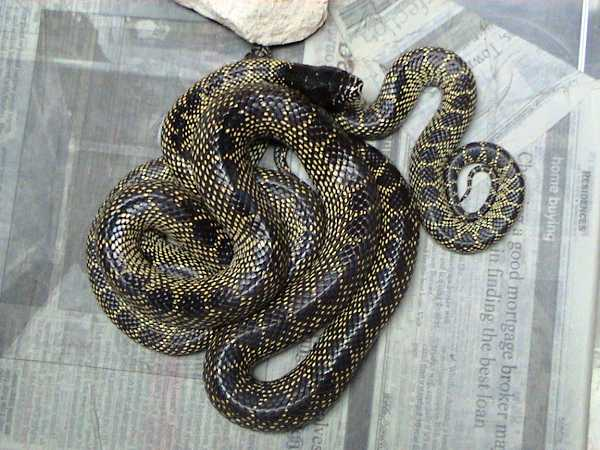
- Pair of desert kingsnakes, Lampropeltis splendida

Conservation status
- Least Concern (IUCN 3.1)

Scientific classification
- Kingdom: Animalia
- Phylum: Chordata
- Class: Reptilia
- Order: Squamata
- Suborder: Serpentes
- Family: Colubridae
- Genus: Lampropeltis
- Species: L. splendida

Binomial name
- Lampropeltis splendida (Baird & Girard, 1854)
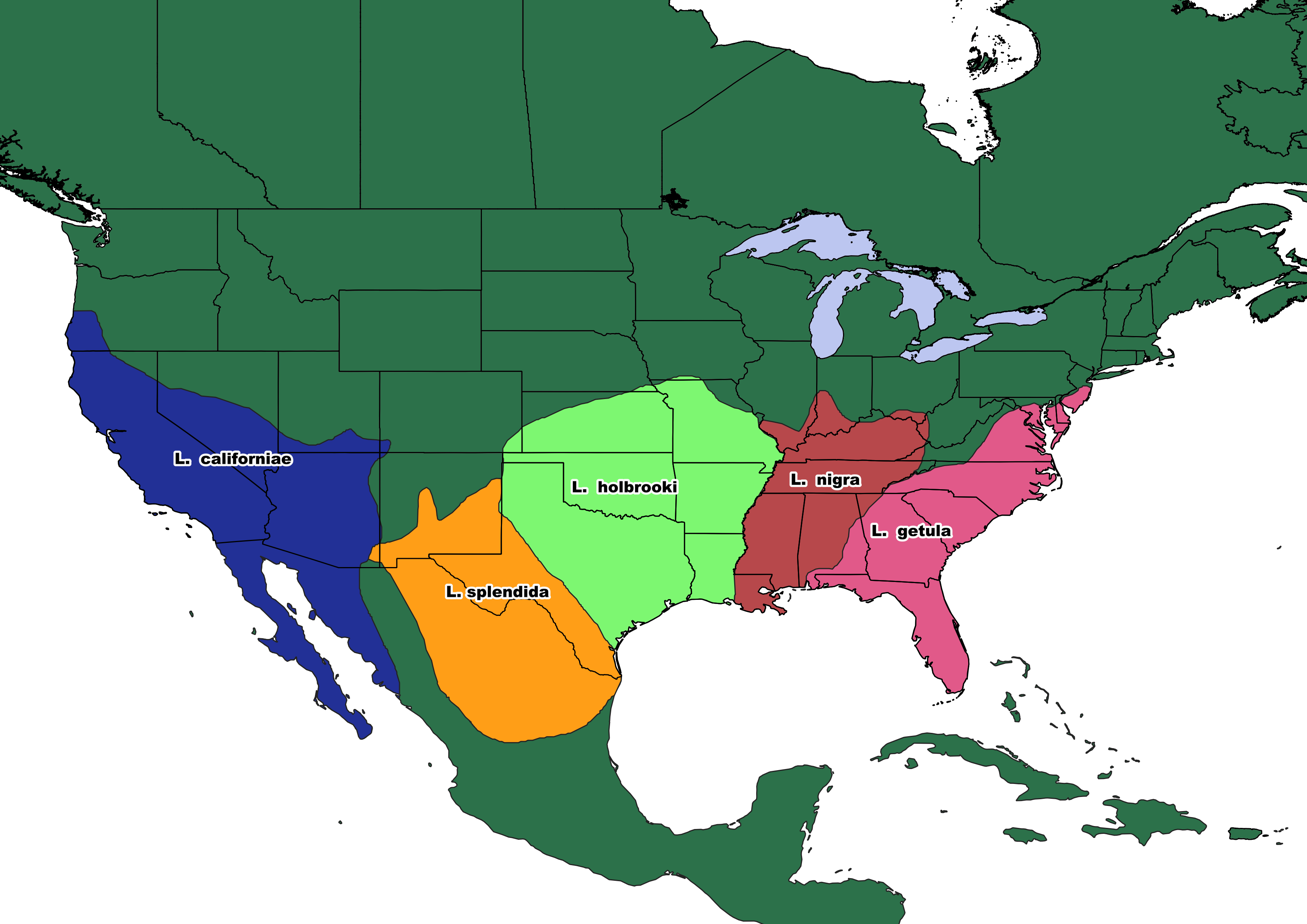

Synonyms
- Ophibolus splendidus Baird & Girard, 1853; Lampropeltis splendida Cope, 1860; Ophibolus getulus splendidus Cope, 1900; Lampropeltis getulus splendida Schmidt & Davis, 1941

= Desert kingsnake =

Species of snake

The desert kingsnake (Lampropeltis splendida) is a species of kingsnake native to Texas, Arizona, and New Mexico, United States. It is not venomous, colored yellow and black. The desert kingsnake's diet consists of rodents, lizards, and smaller snakes, including rattlesnakes. They normally grow 3–4 ft long, but have been known to grow up to 6.8 ft. They are docile creatures when confronted by humans. If they do not try to escape, often they "play dead" by flipping over onto their backs and lying motionless. Some who domesticate kingsnakes, such as ranchers, do so in the hopes that the kingsnakes will feed on other snakes, which might present more of a threat. It was previously considered a subspecies of the common kingsnake. The desert kingsnake belongs to the Colubridae family, which is the largest family of snakes in the world.

== Appearance ==
The snake's glossy dorsum is black or very dark brown colored, finely speckled with off-white or yellow. These pale flecks form dimly defined narrow vertebral crossbands, between which the intervening rectangular areas are black. Pale yellow scales may predominate along the lower sides. The abdomens of both adult and young snakes are mostly black, with white or pale yellow blotches marking the outer ends of the ventral plates. The smooth dorsal scales are arranged in 23 to 25 rows at midbody and the anal plate is undivided.

== Family ==
The desert kingsnake belongs to the Colubridae or Colubrid family, the largest family of snakes in the world.

== Habitat ==
The desert kingsnake may occur in any rural habitat within its range. Despite its common name, it is most likely to be found in mesic areas, especially near water tanks or within riparian corridors.

== Prey ==
This snake is known to be a powerful constrictor; its diet consists of mostly mice if domestic, and other rodents if wild. It also can feed on reptile eggs detected beneath the surface via smell. In part because of its resistance to pitviper venom, the desert kingsnake is able to consume young diamondback rattlesnakes that are common within its range, and at the scent of L. getula even adult western diamondbacks edge hastily backward, shielding their heads with defensive loops.

== Reproduction ==
As with most reptiles, L. splendida lays eggs. Courtship and copulation occur between March and June, with clutches of 5 to 12 adhesive-surfaced eggs deposited in late June or July, sometimes buried as deeply as a foot to prevent drying through their moisture-permeable shells. After about 60 days of incubation, the 8- to 10-inch-long hatchlings, weighing about a fifth of an ounce, emerge. Brightly yellow-speckled in vertebral cross-lines, they also exhibit a lateral row of large, dark brown spots, which as they mature, are gradually fragmented by encroaching yellow flecks.
