= List of Nebraska railroads =

The following railroads operate in the U.S. state of Nebraska.

== Common freight carriers ==
- BNSF Railway (BNSF)
- Canadian National Railway (CN) through subsidiary Chicago Central and Pacific Railroad (CC)
- Canadian Pacific Kansas City (CPKC)
- Manning Rail (MANR)
- Nebraska Central Railroad (NCRC)
- Nebraska Kansas Colorado Railway (NKCR)
- Nebraska Northwestern Railroad (NNW)
- Omaha, Lincoln and Beatrice Railway (OLB)
- Rapid City, Pierre and Eastern Railroad (RCPE)
- Sidney and Lowe Railroad (SLGG)
- Union Pacific Railroad (UP)

== Passenger carriers ==
- Amtrak (AMTK)
- Fremont and Elkhorn Valley Railroad
- Omaha Zoo Railroad

== Defunct railroads ==
Name	Mark	System (Note: This is one or more of the Class I railroads that the railroad became part of, if any.)	From	To	Successor	Notes
Atchison, Lincoln and Columbus Railroad		CB&Q	1871	1871	Atchison and Nebraska Railroad	
Atchison and Nebraska Railroad		CB&Q	1871	1908	Chicago, Burlington and Quincy Railroad	
Atchison, Topeka and Santa Fe Railway	ATSF	ATSF	1890	1996	Burlington Northern and Santa Fe Railway	
Brandon Corporation	BRAN		1978	2006	Brandon Railroad	
Brownville, Fort Kearney (aka. Kearny) and Pacific Railroad		CB&Q	1867	1875	Nebraska Railway	
Burlington and Missouri River Railroad in Nebraska		CB&Q	1869	1880	Chicago, Burlington and Quincy Railroad	
Burlington Northern Inc.	BN		1970	1981	Burlington Northern Railroad	
Burlington Northern Railroad	BN		1981	1996	Burlington Northern and Santa Fe Railway	
Burlington and Southwestern Railway		CB&Q	1869	1870	Atchison and Nebraska Railroad	
Chicago, Burlington and Quincy Railroad	CB&Q	CB&Q	1880	1970	Burlington Northern Inc.	
Chicago, Burlington and Quincy Railway		CB&Q	1901	1907	N/A	Leased the Chicago, Burlington and Quincy Railroad
Chicago Great Western Railroad		CGW	1909	1941	Chicago Great Western Railway	
Chicago Great Western Railway	CGW	CGW	1941	1968	Chicago and North Western Railway	
Chicago Great Western Railway		CGW	1903	1909	Chicago Great Western Railroad	
Chicago, Iowa and Kansas Railroad		CB&Q	1883	1884	Chicago, Nebraska and Kansas Railroad	
Chicago, Kansas and Nebraska Railroad		RI	1886	1886	Chicago, Kansas and Nebraska Railway	
Chicago, Kansas and Nebraska Railway		RI	1886	1891	Chicago, Rock Island and Pacific Railway	
Chicago, Kansas and Western Railroad		ATSF	1888	1890	Atchison, Topeka and Santa Fe Railway	
Chicago, Milwaukee and St. Paul Railway		MILW	1890	1928	Chicago, Milwaukee, St. Paul and Pacific Railroad	
Chicago, Milwaukee, St. Paul and Pacific Railroad	MILW	MILW	1928	1982	N/A	
Chicago, Nebraska and Kansas Railroad		CB&Q	1884	1908	Chicago, Burlington and Quincy Railroad	
Chicago and North Western Railway	CNW	CNW	1901	1972	Chicago and North Western Transportation Company	
Chicago and North Western Transportation Company	CNW	CNW	1972	1995	Union Pacific Railroad	
Chicago, Rock Island and Pacific Railroad	RI, ROCK		1947	1980	Union Pacific Railroad	
Chicago, Rock Island and Pacific Railway	RI	RI	1888	1948	Chicago, Rock Island and Pacific Railroad	
Chicago, St. Paul, Minneapolis and Omaha Railway	CMO	CNW	1881	1972	Chicago and North Western Transportation Company	
Covington, Columbus and Black Hills Railroad		CNW	1875	1879	Sioux City and Nebraska Railroad	
Fillmore Western Railway	FWRY		1996	1999	N/A	
Fremont, Elkhorn and Missouri Valley Railroad		CNW	1869	1903	Chicago and North Western Railway	
Grand Island, Hastings and Southeastern Railroad		UP	1896	1897	St. Joseph and Grand Island Railway	
Grand Island and Marysville Railroad		UP	1885	1885	St. Joseph and Grand Island Railroad	
Grand Island and Wyoming Central Railroad		CB&Q	1886	1897	Chicago, Burlington and Quincy Railroad	
Hastings and Grand Island Railroad		UP	1879	1880	St. Joseph and Western Railroad	
Hastings and Northwestern Railroad		UP	1912	1917	Union Pacific Railroad	
Illinois Central Railroad	IC	IC	1899	1972	Illinois Central Gulf Railroad	
Illinois Central Gulf Railroad	ICG		1972	1985	Chicago Central and Pacific Railroad	
Inter State Bridge and Street Railway Company		IC	1890	1892	Omaha Bridge and Terminal Railway Company	
Kansas City and Beatrice Railroad		MP	1889	1894	Kansas City Northwestern Railroad	
Kansas City Northwestern Railroad			1917	1919	Kansas City Northwestern Railway	
Kansas City Northwestern Railroad		MP	1893	1910	Missouri Pacific Railway	
Kansas City Northwestern Railway			1925	1925	N/A	
Kansas City and Omaha Railroad		CB&Q	1886	1896	Kansas City and Omaha Railway	
Kansas City and Omaha Railway		CB&Q	1896	1908	Chicago, Burlington and Quincy Railroad	
Kansas City, Wyandotte and Northwestern Railroad		MP	1889	1894	Kansas City Northwestern Railroad	
Kansas and Nebraska Railway		UP	1876	1877	St. Joseph and Western Railroad	
Kearney and Black Hills Railway		UP	1889	1898	Union Pacific Railroad	
Lincoln and Black Hills Railroad		CB&Q	1887	1908	Chicago, Burlington and Quincy Railroad	
Lincoln and North Western Railroad		CB&Q	1879	1908	Chicago, Burlington and Quincy Railroad	
Midland Pacific Railway		CB&Q	1868	1875	Nebraska Railway	
Missouri Pacific Railroad	MP	MP	1917	1997	Union Pacific Railroad	
Missouri Pacific Railroad in Nebraska		MP	1917	1956	Missouri Pacific Railroad	
Missouri Pacific Railway		MP	1882	1917	Kansas City Northwestern Railroad, Missouri Pacific Railroad in Nebraska	
Missouri Pacific Railway of Nebraska		MP	1881	1882	Missouri Pacific Railway	
Missouri Valley and Blair Railway and Bridge Company		CNW	1882	1920	Chicago and North Western Railway	
Nebraska Railway		CB&Q	1875	1908	Chicago, Burlington and Quincy Railroad	
Nebraska and Colorado Railroad		CB&Q	1883	1908	Chicago, Burlington and Quincy Railroad	
Nebraska, Kansas and Colorado RailNet	NKCR		1996	2005	Nebraska Kansas Colorado Railway	
Nebraska Southern Railway		MP	1886	1910	Missouri Pacific Railway	
Nebraska and Western Railway		CB&Q	1889	1891	Sioux City, O'Neill and Western Railway	
Nebraska, Wyoming and Western Railroad		CB&Q	1899	1908	Chicago, Burlington and Quincy Railroad	
North-Eastern Nebraska Railroad		CNW	1888	1888	Chicago, St. Paul, Minneapolis and Omaha Railway	
Northern Nebraska Air Line Railroad		CNW	1867	1868	Sioux City and Pacific Railroad	
Omaha Belt Railway		MP	1883	1910	Missouri Pacific Railway	
Omaha Bridge and Terminal Railway Company		IC	1892	1946	Illinois Central Railroad	
Omaha, Niobrara and Black Hills Railroad		UP	1879	1886	Omaha and Republican Valley Railway	
Omaha and North Platte Railroad		CB&Q	1886	1908	Chicago, Burlington and Quincy Railroad	
Omaha and Northern Nebraska Railway		CNW	1878	1880	Sioux City and Nebraska Railroad	
Omaha and Northwestern Railroad		CNW	1869	1878	Omaha and Northern Nebraska Railway	
Omaha and Republican Valley Railroad		UP	1876	1886	Omaha and Republican Valley Railway	
Omaha and Republican Valley Railway		UP	1886	1898	Union Pacific Railroad	
Omaha and South Western Railroad		CB&Q	1869	1908	Chicago, Burlington and Quincy Railroad	
Omaha Southern Railway		MP	1890	1910	Missouri Pacific Railway	
Oxford and Kansas Railroad		CB&Q	1887	1908	Chicago, Burlington and Quincy Railroad	
Pacific Railway in Nebraska		MP	1887	1910	Missouri Pacific Railway	
Randolph and Northeastern Nebraska Railroad		CNW	1890	1890	Chicago, St. Paul, Minneapolis and Omaha Railway	
Republican Valley Railroad		CB&Q	1878	1888	Chicago, Burlington and Quincy Railroad	
Republican Valley and Kansas Railroad		CB&Q	1885	1886	Republican Valley, Kansas and Southwestern Railroad	
Republican Valley, Kansas and Southwestern Railroad		CB&Q	1886	1908	Chicago, Burlington and Quincy Railroad	
Republican Valley and Wyoming Railroad		CB&Q	1887	1908	Chicago, Burlington and Quincy Railroad	
Rock Island Omaha Terminal Railway		RI	1914	1948	Chicago, Rock Island and Pacific Railroad	
St. Joseph and Denver City Railroad		UP	1866	1876	Kansas and Nebraska Railway	
St. Joseph and Grand Island Railroad		UP	1885	1897	Grand Island, Hastings and Southeastern Railroad	
St. Joseph and Grand Island Railway	SJGI	UP	1897			
St. Joseph and Iowa Railroad		RI	1886	1888	Chicago, Rock Island and Pacific Railway	
St. Joseph and Western Railroad		UP	1877	1885	Grand Island and Marysville Railroad	
St. Paul and Sioux City Railroad		CNW	1880	1881	Chicago, St. Paul, Minneapolis and Omaha Railway	
Sioux City Bridge Company		CNW	1889	1956	Chicago and North Western Railway	
Sioux City and Nebraska Railroad		CNW	1879	1883	Chicago, St. Paul, Minneapolis and Omaha Railway, St. Paul and Sioux City Railroad	
Sioux City, O'Neill and Western Railway		CB&Q	1891	1899	Sioux City and Western Railway	
Sioux City and Pacific Railroad		CNW	1868	1901	Chicago and North Western Railway	
Sioux City and Western Railway		CB&Q	1899	1908	Chicago, Burlington and Quincy Railroad	
South Omaha Terminal Railway	SOT		1927	1978	Brandon Corporation	
South Omaha and Western Railroad		UP	1905	1908	Union Pacific Railroad	
Union Pacific Railroad		UP	1862	1880	Union Pacific Railway	
Union Pacific Railway		UP	1880	1897	Union Pacific Railroad	
Union Stock Yards Company of Omaha			1883	1927	South Omaha Terminal Railway	

Not completed

- Atkinson and Northern Railroad
