= National Register of Historic Places listings in Otoe County, Nebraska =

Location of Otoe County in Nebraska

Otoe County, Nebraska, United States, has 27 properties and districts listed on the National Register of Historic Places, including two National Historic Landmarks. Another two properties that were once listed have been removed.

The locations of National Register properties and districts for which the latitude and longitude coordinates are included below may be seen in a map.

This National Park Service list is complete through NPS recent listings posted October 30, 2026.

== Current listings ==
	Name on the Register	Image	Date listed	Location	City or town	Description
1	Arbor Lodge	Arbor Lodge	April 16, 1969 (#69000135)	Arbor Lodge State Park, west of Nebraska City; 40°40′49″N 95°52′42″W	Nebraska City	
2	Boscobel	Boscobel	June 17, 1976 (#76001133)	North of Nebraska City on Steamwagon Rd. 40°40′59″N 95°52′36″W	Nebraska City	
3	Bridge	Bridge	June 29, 1992 (#92000737)	Unnamed stream, southwest of Nebraska City; 40°41′45″N 95°53′01″W	Nebraska City	Road leading to bridge no longer exists. Part of the Highway Bridges in Nebraska Multiple Property Submission (MPS).
4	Bridge	Bridge	June 29, 1992 (#92000733)	County road over an unnamed stream, 4.1 miles (6.6 km) southwest of Lorton; 40°34′01″N 96°05′26″W	Lorton	
5	Camp Creek Cemetery and Chapel	Camp Creek Cemetery and Chapel	March 21, 2011 (#11000102)	Northeast corner of County Road P and S. 70th Rd. 40°34′04″N 95°48′08″W	Nebraska City	
6	Camp Creek School, Otoe County District No. 54	Camp Creek School, Otoe County District No. 54	June 5, 1980 (#80002459)	6903 Q Rd; 40°33′08″N 95°48′42″W	Nebraska City	
7	Grand Army of the Republic (G.A.R.) Memorial Hall	Grand Army of the Republic (G.A.R.) Memorial Hall	February 25, 1994 (#94000067)	908 1st Corso; 40°40′33″N 95°51′25″W	Nebraska City	
8	Harmony School, School District No. 53	Harmony School, School District No. 53	July 22, 2005 (#05000723)	6265 Q Rd. 40°33′09″N 95°52′20″W	Nebraska City	
9	Kregel Wind Mill Company	Kregel Wind Mill Company	February 25, 1993 (#93000061)	1416 Central Ave. 40°40′37″N 95°51′49″W	Nebraska City	Now the Kregel Windmill Factory Museum. Designated a National Historic Landmark in 2024.
10	George F. Lee Octagon Houses	George F. Lee Octagon Houses	November 23, 1977 (#77000834)	South of Nebraska City off U.S. Route 73; 40°34′18″N 95°48′05″W	Nebraska City	
11	Little Nemaha River Bridge	Little Nemaha River Bridge	June 29, 1992 (#92000720)	County road over the Little Nemaha River, 1.8 miles (2.9 km) northwest of Dunbar; 40°40′58″N 96°02′43″W	Dunbar	Bridge no longer there; replaced by culvert.
12	Joachim Massow-Charles and Annie Schutz House	Joachim Massow-Charles and Annie Schutz House	August 28, 2012 (#12000567)	4250 F Rd. 40°42′39″N 96°03′34″W	Dunbar	
13	Mayhew Cabin	Mayhew Cabin	February 11, 2011 (#11000013)	2012 4th Corso; 40°40′24″N 95°52′12″W	Nebraska City	
14	Memorial Building	Memorial Building	March 22, 2016 (#16000106)	810 1st Corso; 40°40′33″N 95°51′20″W	Nebraska City	
15	Morton-James Public Library	Morton-James Public Library	May 28, 1976 (#76001134)	923 First Corso; 40°40′32″N 95°51′26″W	Nebraska City	
16	Nebraska City Burlington Depot	Nebraska City Burlington Depot	August 8, 1997 (#97000881)	Southeast intersection of 6th Street and 7th Corso; 40°40′13″N 95°51′09″W	Nebraska City	
17	Nebraska City Historic District	Nebraska City Historic District	October 29, 1976 (#76001135)	Roughly bounded by 5th Ave., 3rd St., 19th St., and 1st Corso; 40°40′43″N 95°51′30″W	Nebraska City	
18	Otoe County Courthouse	Otoe County Courthouse	June 18, 1976 (#76001136)	10th St. and Central Ave. 40°40′34″N 95°51′30″W	Nebraska City	
19	Palmyra Pioneer Cemetery	Palmyra Pioneer Cemetery	November 8, 2021 (#100007151)	Jct. of Giles and North 10th Rds. 40°41′22″N 96°22′08″W	Palmyra	
20	St. Benedict's Catholic Church	St. Benedict's Catholic Church	January 27, 1983 (#83001100)	411 5th Rue; 40°40′11″N 95°50′28″W	Nebraska City	
21	South 13th Street Historic District	South 13th Street Historic District	October 29, 1976 (#76001137)	Roughly bounded by 12th Street, 14th Street, 1st Corso, and 6th Corso; 40°40′24″N 95°51′39″W	Nebraska City	
22	South Nebraska City Historic District	South Nebraska City Historic District	October 22, 1976 (#76001138)	Roughly bounded by 4th Street, 11th Street, 1st Corso, and 4th Corso; 40°40′27″N 95°51′14″W	Nebraska City	
23	U.S. Post Office	U.S. Post Office	September 3, 1971 (#71000488)	202 S. 8th St. 40°40′32″N 95°51′20″W	Nebraska City	Now Farmers Bank & Trust Co.
24	Unadilla Main Street Historic District	Unadilla Main Street Historic District	February 17, 1995 (#95000095)	Northern side of Main St. between G and H Sts. 40°40′54″N 96°16′21″W	Unadilla	
25	Jasper A. Ware House	Jasper A. Ware House	July 16, 1973 (#73001070)	420 Steinhart Park Rd. 40°40′18″N 95°52′50″W	Nebraska City	Operated as museum under name "Wildwood Historic Center".
26	Wolf Creek Bridge	Wolf Creek Bridge	June 29, 1992 (#92000738)	Vacated county road over Wolf Creek, 10.3 miles (16.6 km) northeast of Dunbar; 40°47′03″N 95°54′57″W	Dunbar	
27	Wyoming Bridge	Wyoming Bridge	June 29, 1992 (#92000736)	County road over Squaw Creek, 9.1 miles (14.6 km) northeast of Dunbar; 40°44′43″N 95°53′33″W	Dunbar	Apparently replaced by beam bridge in 2003

== Former listing ==
	Name on the Register	Image	Date listed	Date removed	Location	City or town	Description
1	Little Nemaha River Bridge		June 29, 1992 (#92000723)	December 19, 2012	County road over the Little Nemaha River, 3 miles (4.8 km) northwest of Syracuse; 40°40′00″N 96°14′09″W	Syracuse	Severely damaged by flooding in 2010 and subsequently demolished.
2	McCartney School District 17	McCartney School District 17	November 15, 2000 (#00001379)	March 25, 2019	5797 H Road; 40°40′57″N 95°55′00″W	Nebraska City	Apparently removed or demolished

== See also ==
- List of National Historic Landmarks in Nebraska
- National Register of Historic Places listings in Nebraska
