= Boscobel (Nebraska City, Nebraska) =

- U.S. National Register of Historic Places
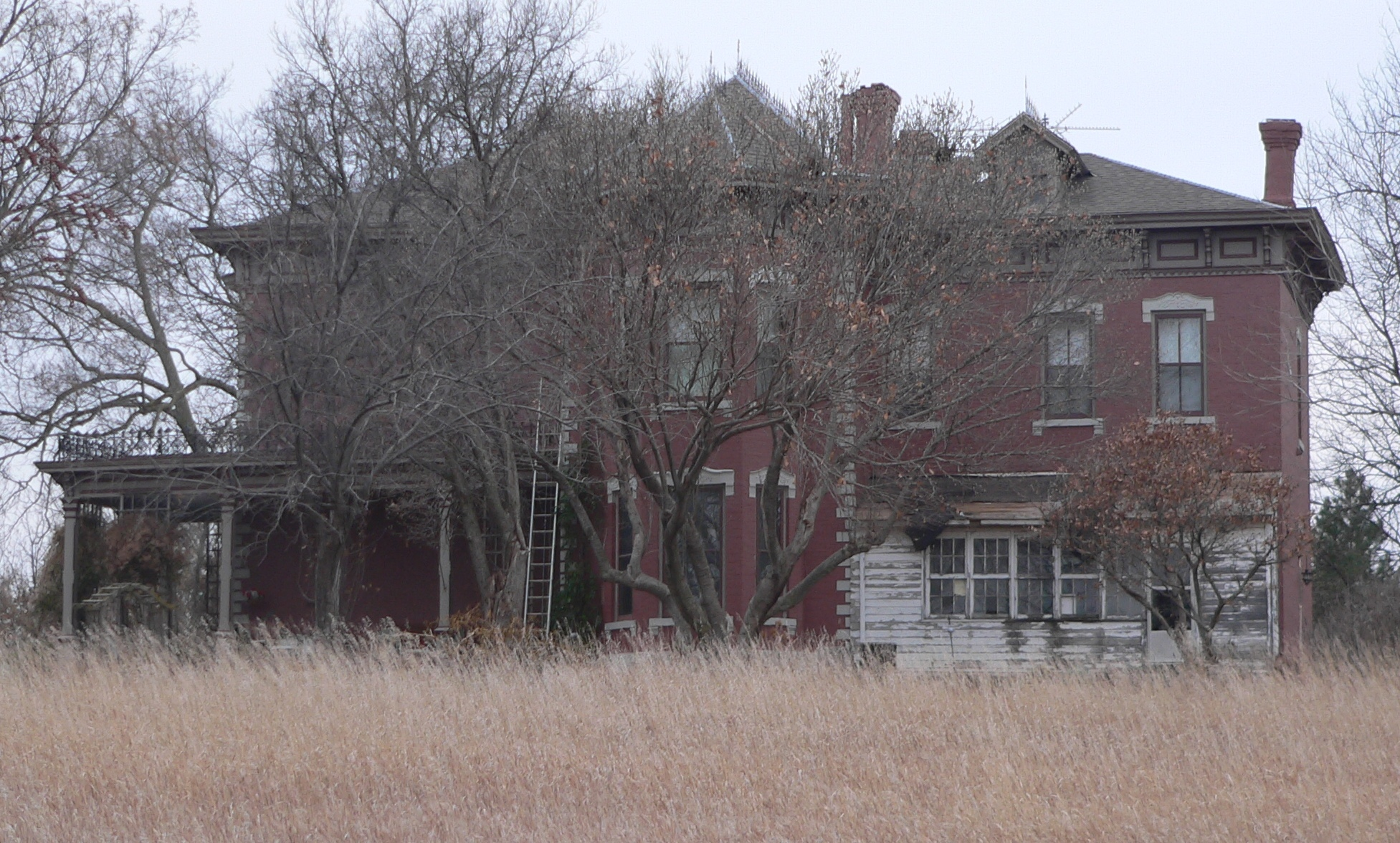
- The house in 2013

- Location within Nebraska Location within the United States
- Nearest city: Nebraska City, Nebraska
- Coordinates: 40°40′59″N 95°52′36″W
- Area: less than one acre
- Built: 1879
- Architectural style: Italianate
- NRHP reference No.: 76001133
- Added to NRHP: June 17, 1976

Boscobel is a historic two-story house in Nebraska City, Nebraska. It was built in 1879 for Rollin M. Rolfe, a grocer, banker and co-founder of the Midland Pacific Railway who served on Nebraska City's city council as a Republican in 1873. The house was designed in the Italianate style, with "paneled and bracketed cornice" and "stone quoins." Rolfe moved out of the house in 1886. It has been listed on the National Register of Historic Places since June 17, 1976.

It was deemed a "fine example" of Italianate style in Nebraska, though like other surviving examples it is modest in its implementation of the style, forgoing extra flourishes.

The name "Boscobel", as applied apparently first to the 1632-built Boscobel House in England, associated with the escape of King Charles II after being defeated by Cromwell at the Battle of Worcester, was believed to derive from the Italian phrase bosco bello meaning "in the midst of fair woods".

== See also ==
- Jasper A. Ware House, home of another co-founder of the railroad, also NRHP-listed
