= Jasper A. Ware House =

- U.S. National Register of Historic Places
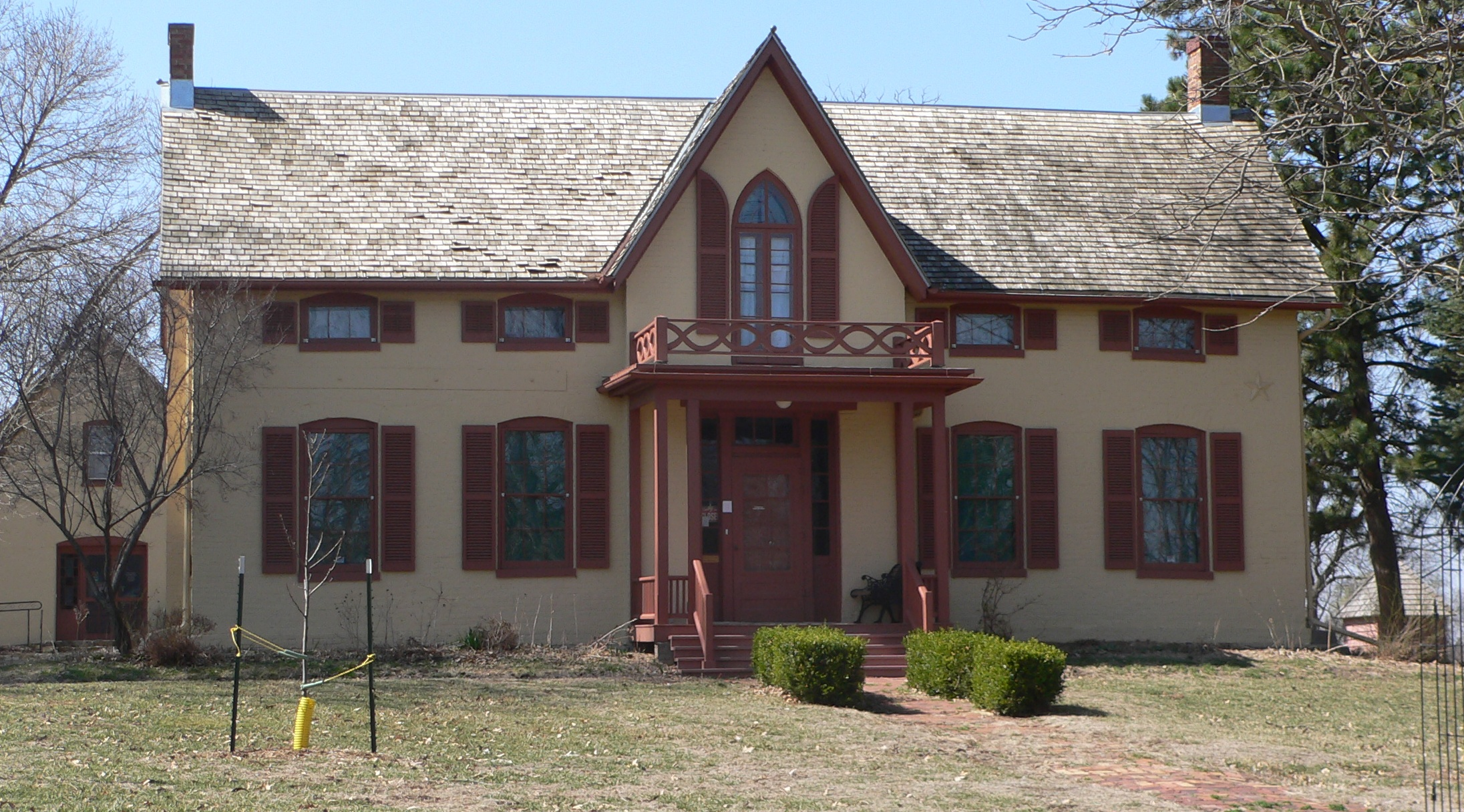
- The house in 2012

- Location within Nebraska Location within the United States
- Nearest city: Nebraska City, Nebraska
- Coordinates: 40°40′18″N 95°52′48″W
- Area: 0.5 acres (0.20 ha)
- Built: 1869
- Architectural style: Gothic Revival
- NRHP reference No.: 73001070
- Added to NRHP: July 16, 1973

The Jasper A. Ware House, now known as the Wildwood Historic Center, is a historic one-and-a-half-story house in Nebraska City, Nebraska. It was built in 1869 for Jasper A. Ware, a farmer, real estate investor and co-founder of the Midland Pacific Railway. It was designed in the Gothic Revival style, with a "gabled roof, segmental arches, projecting gabled entrance pavilion, pointed arch window over entrance door, simple wooden tracery under two end gables." It has been listed on the National Register of Historic Places since July 16, 1973.

== See also ==
- Boscobel (Nebraska City, Nebraska), home of another co-founder of the railroad, also NRHP-listed
