= U.S. Post Office (Nebraska City, Nebraska) =

- U.S. National Register of Historic Places
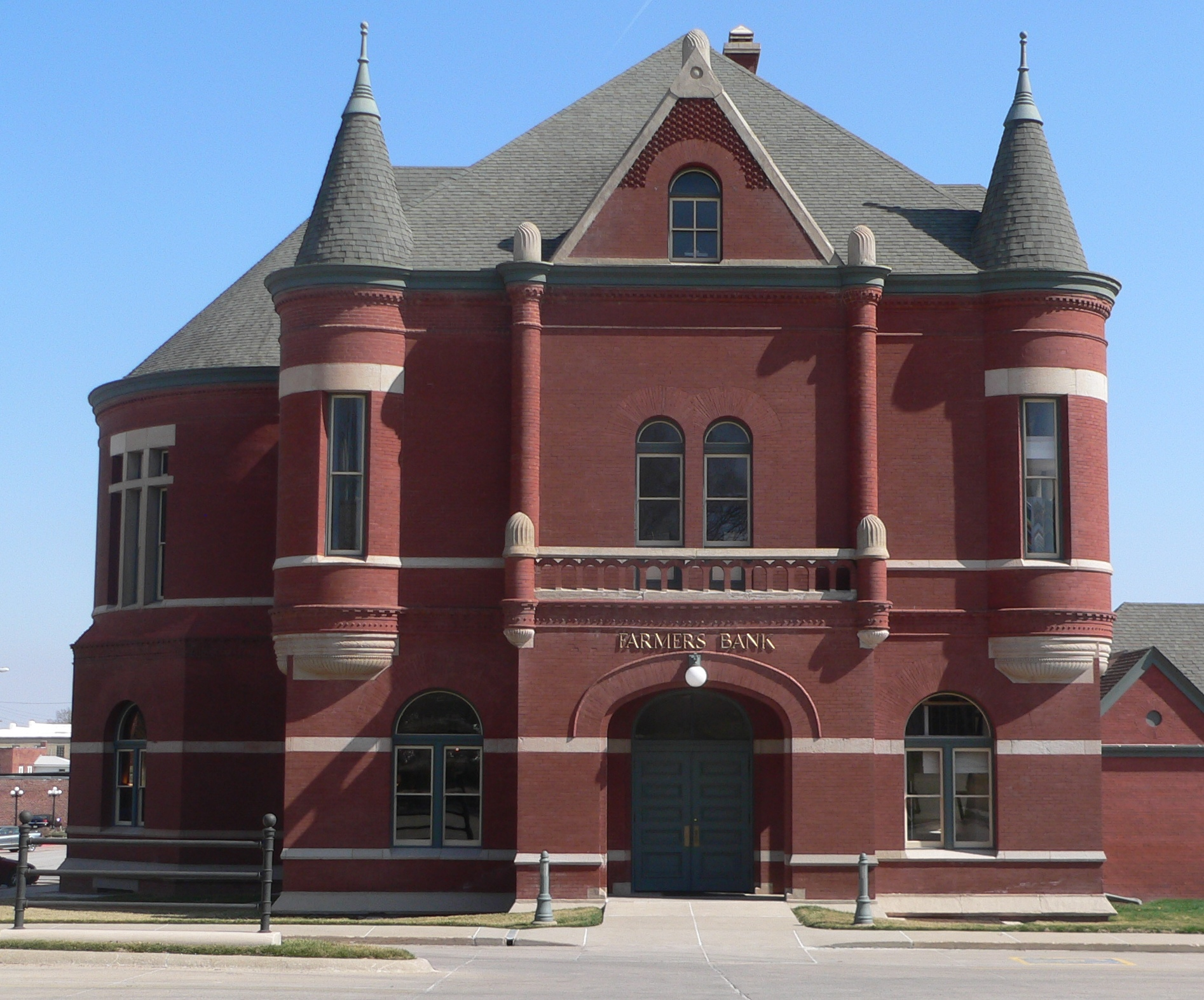
- The building in 2012

- Location within Nebraska Location within the United States
- Location: 202 South 8th Street, Nebraska City, Nebraska
- Coordinates: 40°40′31″N 95°51′18″W
- Built: 1888
- Built by: Harry Wales
- Architect: M.E. Bell
- Architectural style: Romanesque Revival
- NRHP reference No.: 71000488
- Added to NRHP: September 3, 1971

The U.S. Post Office is a historic building in Nebraska City, Nebraska. It was built by Harry Wales in 1888, and designed in the Romanesque Revival style by M.E. Bell. By the 1970s, it was "the oldest Post Office in continuous use in Nebraska."

It was intended to serve as a U.S. Court House and Post Office, but there is no record of it ever having served as a courthouse. It has been listed on the National Register of Historic Places since September 3, 1971.
