= Little Nemaha River Bridge =

Little Nemaha River Bridge may refer to:

- Little Nemaha River Bridge (Dunbar, Nebraska), listed on the National Register of Historic Places in Otoe County, Nebraska
- Little Nemaha River Bridge (Syracuse, Nebraska), listed on the National Register of Historic Places in Otoe County, Nebraska
