= Otoe County Courthouse =

- U.S. National Register of Historic Places
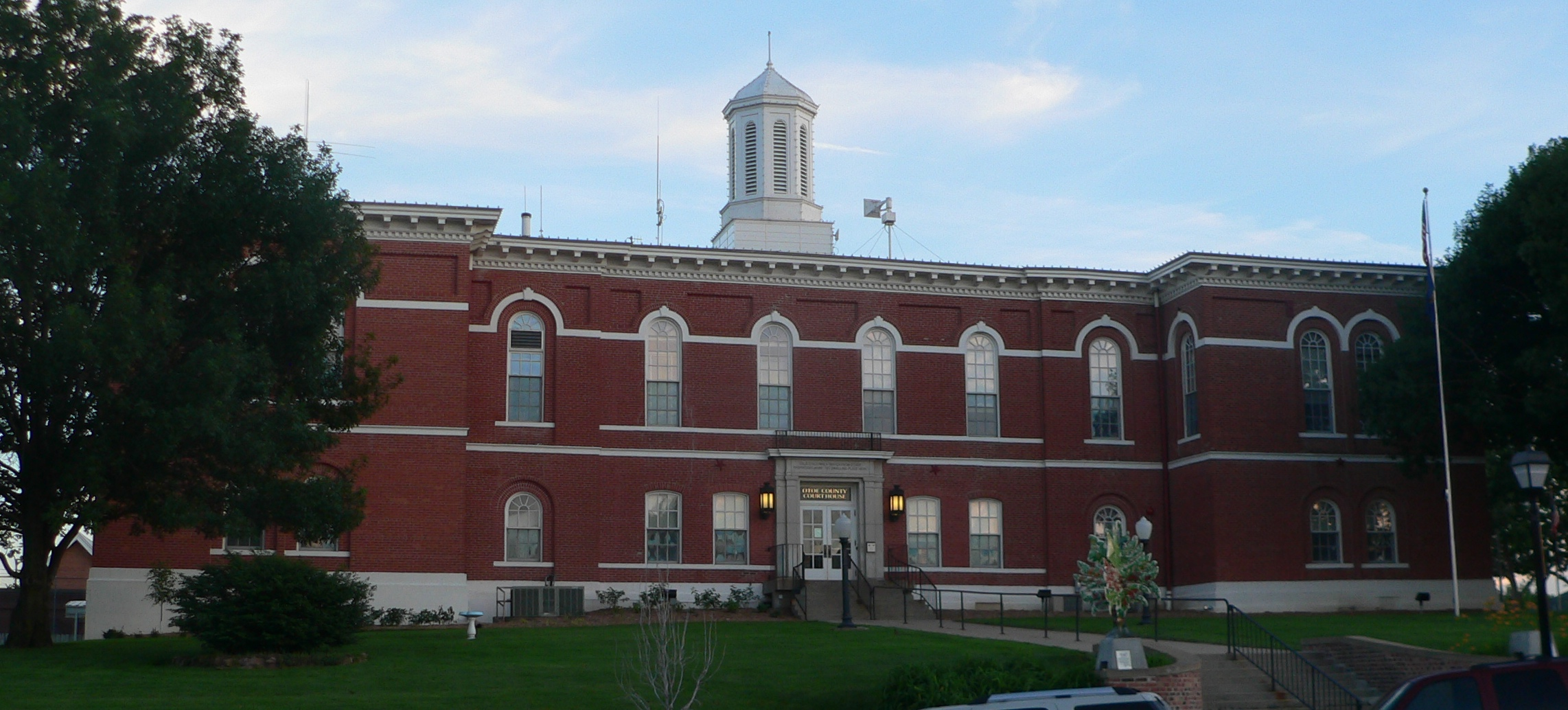
- View from the north, across Central Avenue

- Location within Nebraska Location within the United States
- Location: 1021 Central Avenue, Nebraska City, Nebraska
- Coordinates: 40.676196°N 95.858279°W
- Built: 1865
- NRHP reference No.: 76001136

The Otoe County Courthouse is home to the county seat of Otoe County, Nebraska in Nebraska City, Nebraska. The building contains both the Nebraska City Court and the Otoe County Court along with the government and law enforcement offices of both. The building sits at 1021 Central Avenue in Nebraska City. The courthouse is currently on the National Register of Historic Places and the oldest public building in the state of Nebraska.

== History ==
The original courthouse, a simple two-story building, was built in 1865 by William R. Craig and F. W. Wood, costing $22,500 at the time. This was a vast improvement upon its predecessors, consisting of small offices in local stores and a cabin at one point. The first addition was completed in 1882. This added a large wing to the square building where the courts and department offices are today. In 1936, an identical wing was added with similar purposes. A mural outside the courtrooms shows the history of Nebraska City and of the courthouse.

== See also ==
- Nebraska City, Nebraska
- National Register of Historic Places listings in Otoe County, Nebraska
