= Camp Creek School, Otoe County District No. 54 =

- U.S. National Register of Historic Places
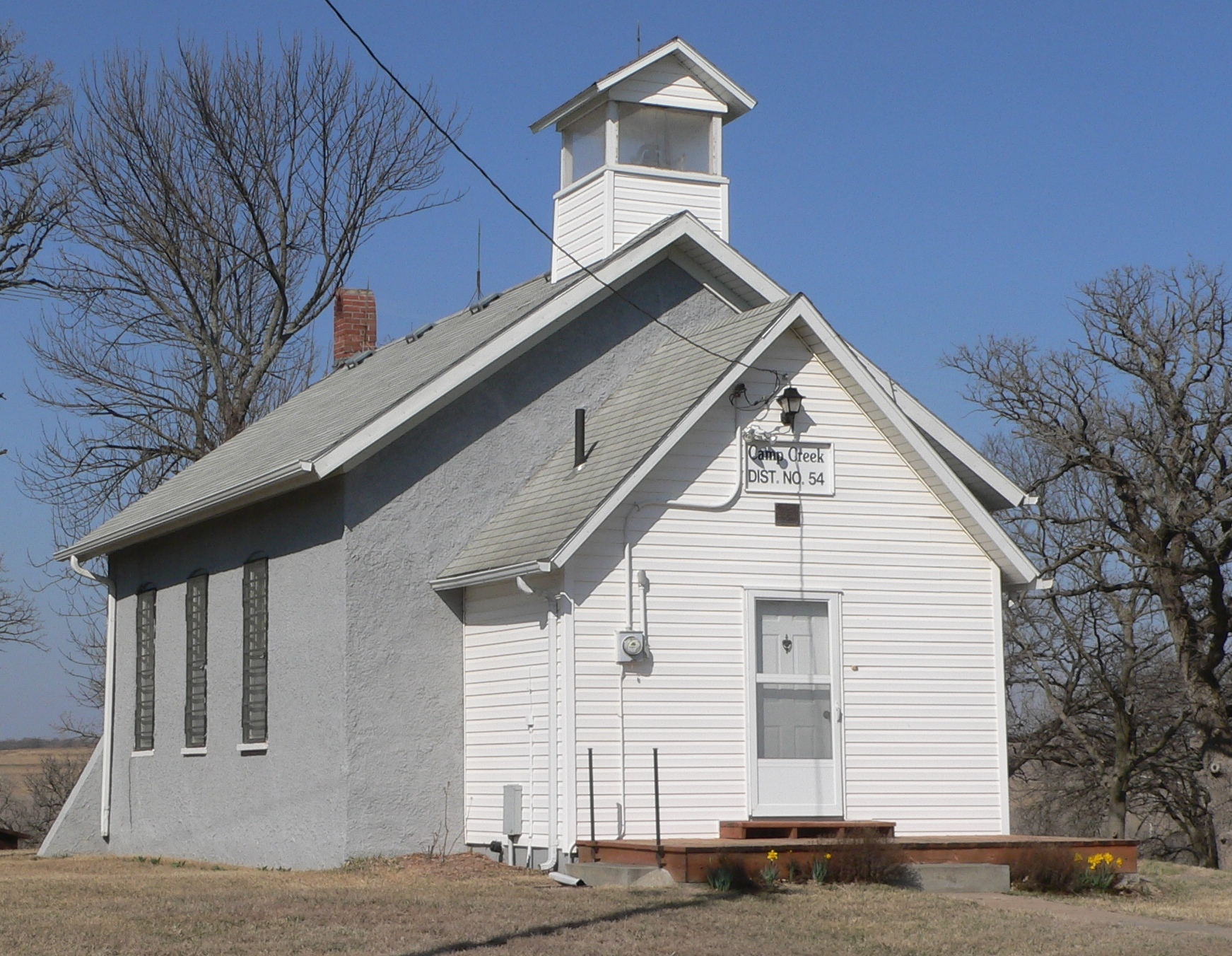

- Location within Nebraska
- Location: 6903 Q Rd., in Otoe County, Nebraska near Nebraska City, Nebraska
- Coordinates: 40°33′08″N 95°48′42″W
- Area: 2.1 acres (0.85 ha)
- Built: 1870
- NRHP reference No.: 80002459
- Added to NRHP: June 5, 1980

Camp Creek School, Otoe County District No. 54, in Otoe County, Nebraska near Nebraska City, Nebraska, was built in 1870–75. Its building is one of few surviving one-room schoolhouses in Nebraska. It was listed on the National Register of Historic Places in 1980.

It is a one-story brick building, built in 1870–75, which was covered in stucco between 1922 and 1924 because the brick was detiorating.

It faces south onto east-west Q Road, at S. 69th Rd., about three miles west of the Missouri River.

Its National Register nomination in 1980 stated: "Otoe County District #54, one of the few surviving one-room schools in Nebraska, is a link to the territorial beginnings of our state. Its long history illustrates the hardships and struggles of the pioneers and their determination to sacrifice to give their children better opportunities than had been theirs back in the eastern states from which they poured in as the land was opened up to settlement. The school was the first home of the church around which developed the Camp Creek community grouped about a Congregational church and the Camp Creek Cemetery. The church is no more, a victim of the automobile and the Depression of the 1930s. The school house is still in use, but it will soon close and the district be dissolved because of declining enrollment in this day when the small family farm, too, is passing. The second building of the Camp Creek School was a source of community pride, its neat red brick structure harmonizing with the style of the church a mile directly west, and meeting the recommendations of the county superintendent for suitable accommodations in which to educate the youth. In the early days, too, it was a community gathering place for spell-downs, amateur dramatics, box suppers, and other forms of simple and wholesome entertainment."

It is located at 6903 Q Rd., southeast of Nebraska City on RR3.
