= Lloyd Fallers =

American anthropologist (1925–1974)

- Lloyd Fallers (far right) with (from left to right) Robert McCormick Adams, Elizabeth Munk Oppenheim, and A. Leo Oppenheim
- Born: Lloyd Ashton Fallers Jr. August 29, 1925; Nebraska City, U.S.
- Died: July 4, 1974 (aged 48); Chicago, Illinois, U.S.
- Education: University of Chicago
- Occupation: Professor
- Spouse: Margaret Fallers
- Children: 2

Lloyd Ashton "Tom" Fallers Jr. (August 29, 1925 – July 4, 1974) was an American social and cultural anthropologist who was the A. A. Michelson Distinguished Service Professor in the departments of anthropology and sociology at the University of Chicago. Fallers' work in social and cultural anthropology focused on social stratification and the development of new states in East Africa (especially Buganda) and Turkey.

== Works ==
- 1964: The King's Men: Leadership and Status in Uganda on the Eve of Independence, Oxford University Press
