= Kregel Windmill Factory Museum =

- Kregel Wind Mill Company
- U.S. National Register of Historic Places
- U.S. National Historic Landmark
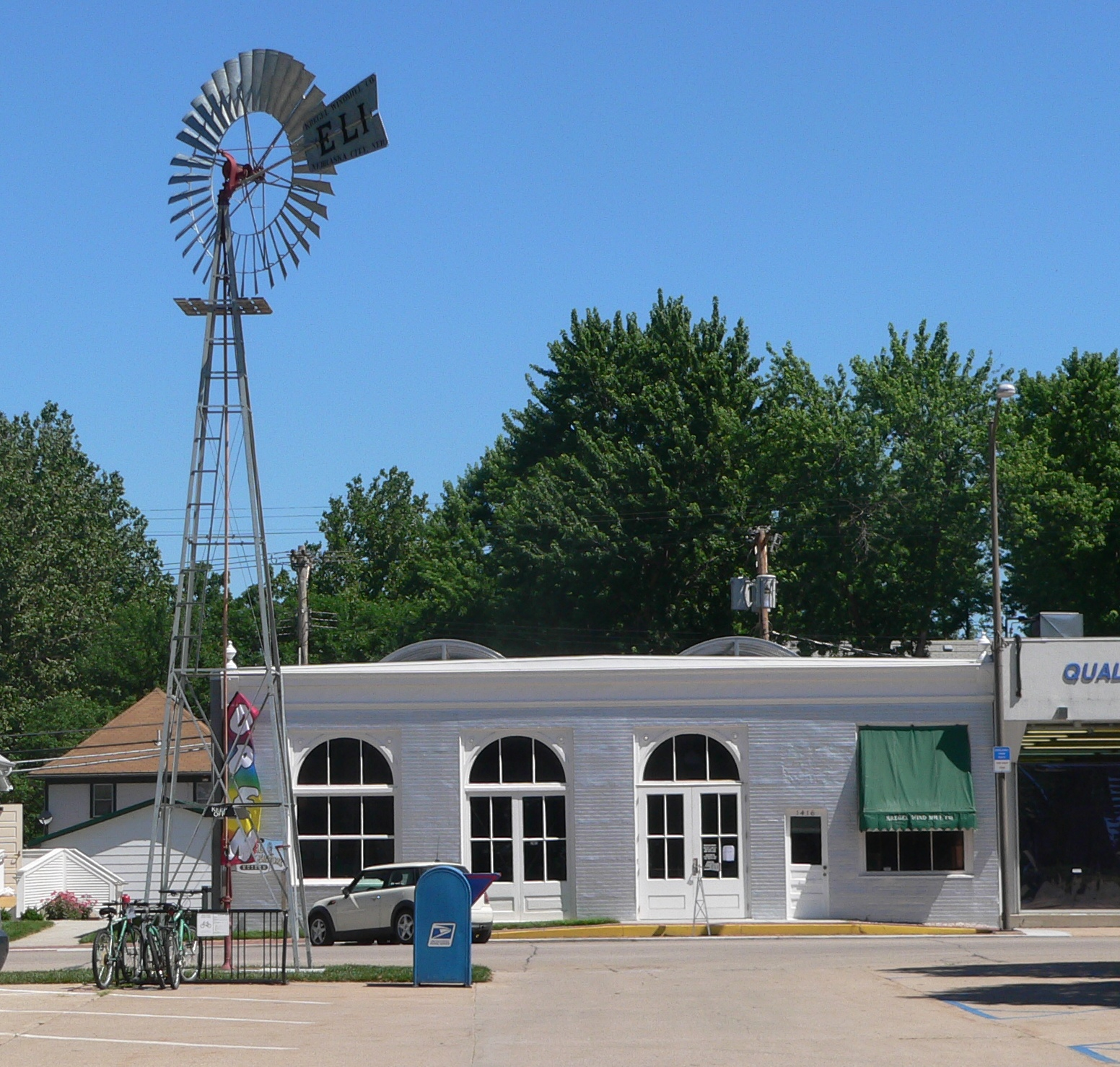

- Location within Nebraska Location within the United States
- Location: 1416 Central Ave., Nebraska City, Nebraska
- Coordinates: 40°40′37″N 95°51′48″W
- Area: less than one acre
- Built: 1903
- Architectural style: Romanesque, Round Arch Style
- NRHP reference No.: 93000061 (NRHP nomination); 100011369 (NHL designation)

Significant dates
- Added to NRHP: February 25, 1993
- Designated NHL: December 13, 2024

The Kregel Wind Mill Company produced water pumping windmills in Nebraska City, Nebraska starting in 1879. It is now the Kregel Windmill Factory Museum.

== History ==
The brand of windmills that the Kregel Windmill Company produced was called "ELI" — as an homage to one of George Kregel's friends, a deceased preacher named Eli Huber. Kregel windmills were used to pump water from wells at farms and homes in the region of southeastern Nebraska surrounding Nebraska City. Managed by George F. Kregel, the company moved to the current Central Avenue building in 1903, continuing to operate there for 88 years.

The Central Avenue factory has been preserved with all of its manufacturing equipment. The machinery in the factory is powered by a central transverse line shaft and leather belts coming down to pulleys on each machine. The line shaft itself was originally powered by a single cylinder engine, but was converted to electricity in the 1920s. After manufacturing more than 2000 windmills, the company stopped production in the 1940s, and the Kregels worked instead in pump repair and well maintenance until 1991 in the same location.

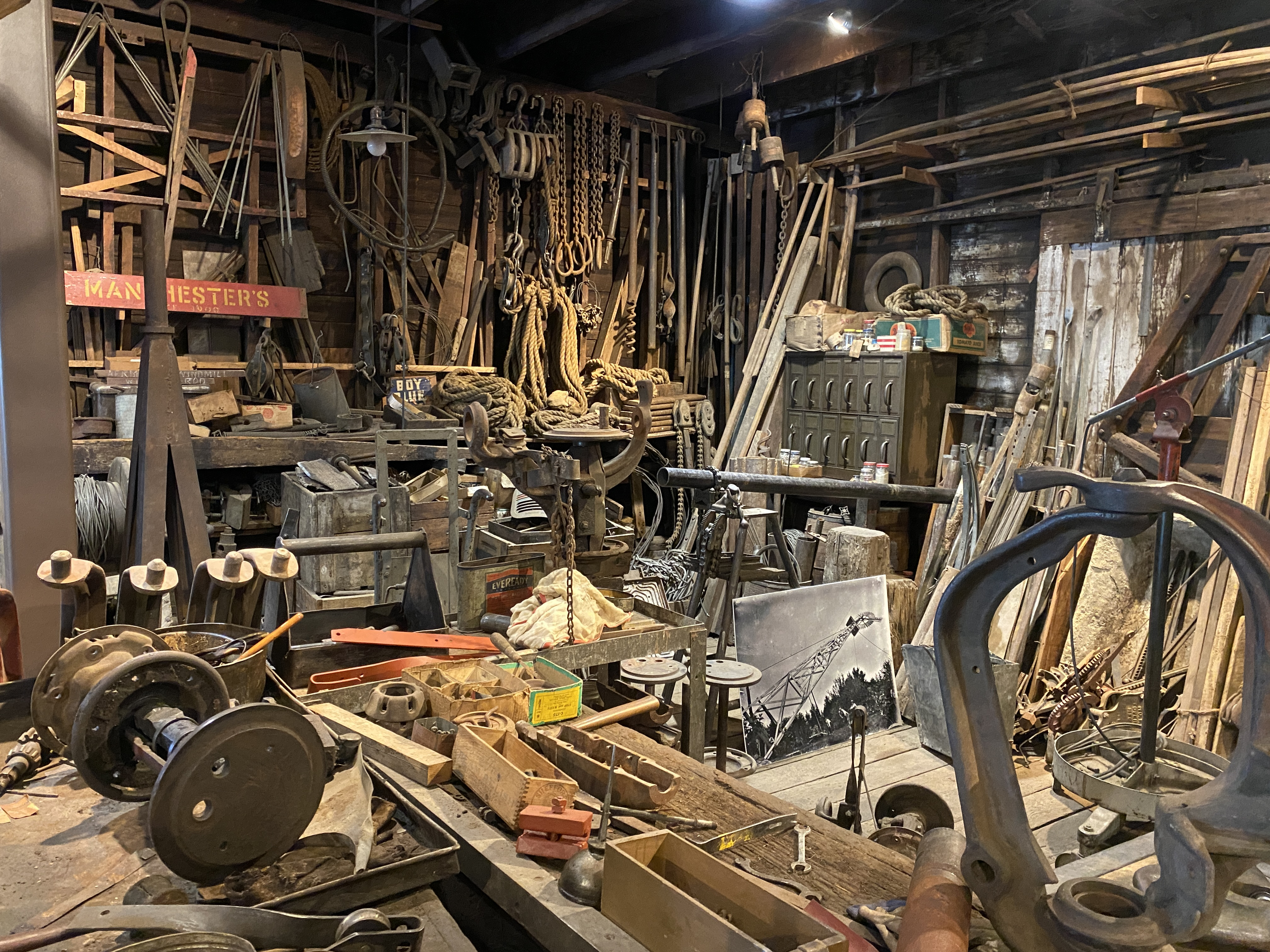
Kregel Windmill Factory Museum Interior

The factory is a one-story wood-frame building. The flat-roofed building has two small roof monitors for light and ventilation. The front facade is clad with pressed sheet metal in a brick pattern, with four bays. The interior is a large open space with two structural bays, and a small office space. All of the company's tools (including "ledger books on shelves, telephone, pencils and pens on the desk, even an overcoat on a hook") and records have been preserved.

Since September 2019, the executive director has been Isaiah Yott.

== Machinery ==
Featured machinery in the factory includes:

Turret lathe with belts made out of bison hide

- Turret Lathe, 1920
- Power shear, punch and riveting machine, 1875
- Metal-turning lathe, 1865
- Drill presses, 1900
- Broaching machine, 1910
- Four-spindle production drill press, 1900
- Pedestal grinder, 1910
- Internal grinder, 1910
- Drop hammer, 1900
- Snag grinder, 1900
- Cross-cutoff circular saw, 1900
- Table saw, 1900
- Thickness planer, 1900
- Joiner, 1900
- Sheet metal bench with tools, 1910
- Sheet metal rolls, 1900
- Beading machine, 1900
- Sheet metal brake, 1900
- Sheet metal shear, 1900
- Power transmission system, 1900
- Power hacksaw, 1900

== See also ==
- Agriculture museums in the United States
- List of museums in Nebraska
- National Register of Historic Places listings in Otoe County, Nebraska
