= Omaha and Republican Valley Railway =

Railway branch line in Nebraska, US

The Omaha and Republican Valley Railway was a branch line of the Union Pacific that crossed Nebraska. Traversing several counties, including Buffalo County, the Railway was the impetus for several settlements, and upon its demise, several ghost towns. The Railway ran from Boelus to South Ravenna, to Poole and on to Pleasanton, Nebraska.

== About ==
In 1880, the Omaha and Republican Valley Railway Company was consolidated with the Omaha, Niobrara and Black Hills Railroad Company, and in 1886 was consolidated again with the Blue Valley Railroad.

Trains started traveling along the Omaha and Republican Valley Railroad in 1890, with Pleasanton as the terminus. The Pleasanton townsite was surveyed and platted in 1890, and grew quickly. Situated on the South Loup River, Pleasanton was plagued by floods. The flood of 1947 washed away the railroad tracks, and the line was officially abandoned in 1948.

One ghost town was called Sartoria, which was built with the expectation of being the terminus of the railroad. The tracks never got that far. It was seven miles beyond Pleasanton. Another ghost town along the tracks was Watertown, where the steam locomotives would load up with water. Watertown had a post office, established in 1890, and a schoolhouse, formed in 1886. By the 1930s Watertown began to decline.
