= Mayhew Cabin =

- U.S. National Register of Historic Places
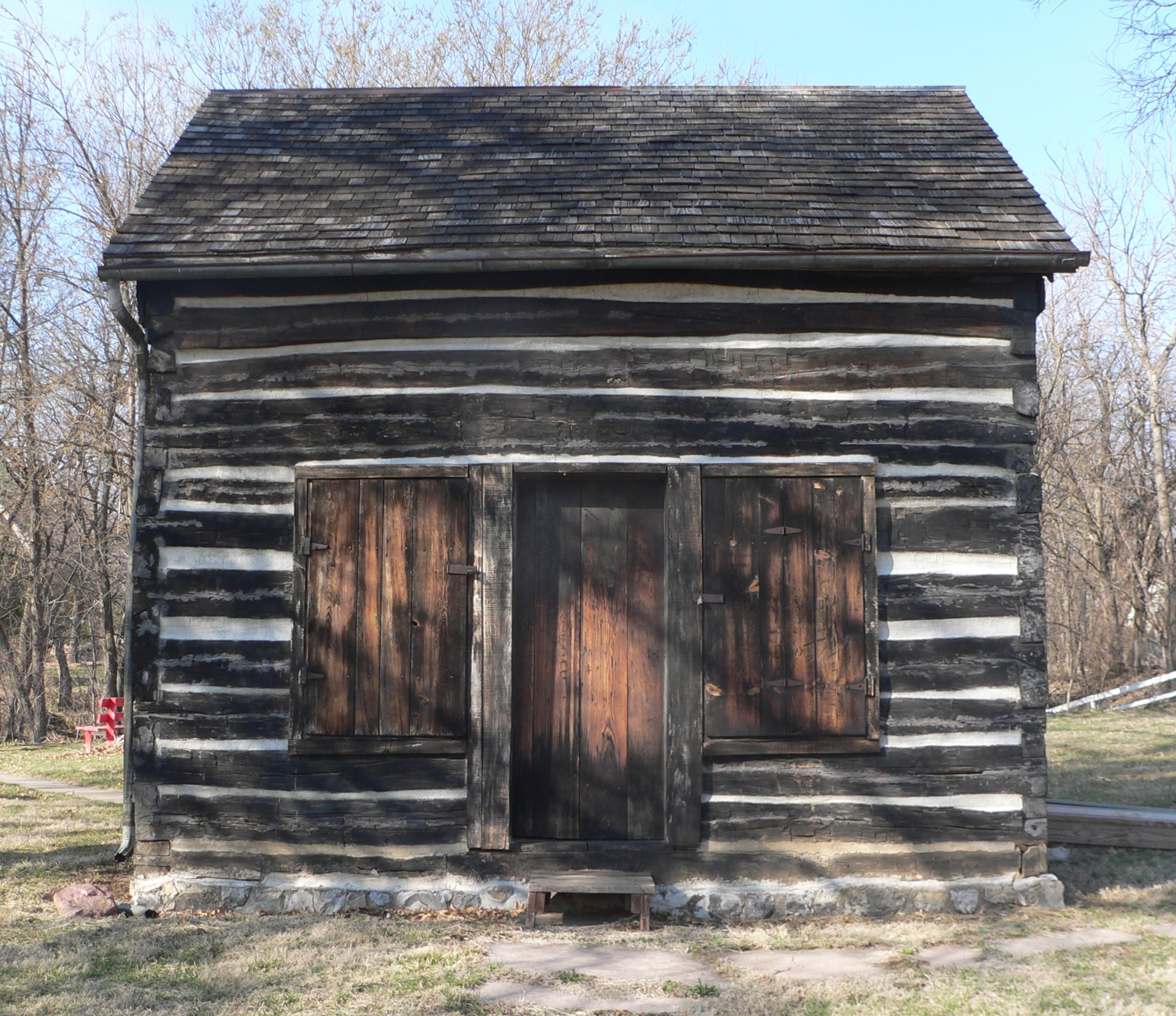
- Front (south) of Mayhew Cabin.

- Location within Nebraska
- Location: 2012 4th Corso, Nebraska City, Nebraska
- Coordinates: 40°40′24″N 95°52′12.1″W
- Area: less than 1 acre (0.40 ha)
- NRHP reference No.: 11000013
- Added to NRHP: February 11, 2011

The Mayhew Cabin (officially Mayhew Cabin & Historic Village, also known as John Brown's Cave), in Nebraska City, Nebraska, is one of only two Underground Railroad sites in Nebraska officially recognized by the National Park Service. It is included among the sites of the National Underground Railroad Network to Freedom.

== History ==
The Mayhew Cabin was built in 1855 by Allen and Barbara (Kagi) Mayhew, who had moved to Nebraska in 1854. Mrs. Mayhew's younger brother John Henry Kagi came to stay with the Mayhews in 1855. Kagi had earned a law degree and had strong anti-slavery views. By 1856, he had moved to Kansas Territory and became an ally of the abolitionist John Brown.

Kagi became Brown's most trusted advisor and his "Secretary of War". Brown believed that slavery would not end without bloodshed. Brown had for years been formulating a plan that he was convinced would end slavery forever – a raid on the arsenal at Harper's Ferry, Virginia. This effort was supposed to arm slaves who would in turn hold an armed uprising against their masters. Once free, they would form a community where they could live peacefully. But, before he moved forward with that plan, Brown, Kagi, and the rest of Brown's followers were dealing with anti-slavery efforts in "Bleeding Kansas". By December 1858, they were at Bain's Fort, having freed an anti-slavery friend from captivity.

At the behest of a slave named Jim Daniels, on December 20, 1858, Brown and a group of his men, including Kagi, rode into Vernon County, Missouri from Kansas with the intention of taking Daniels and other slaves from their masters and taking them all the way to Canada to freedom. When they neared their destination they split into two groups. Brown's group set off to free the Daniels family first. Daniels, his pregnant wife, and their two children were owned by the James Lawrence estate and were at the home of Lawrence's son-in-law, Harvey Hicklin, and his wife. At gunpoint, the Daniels family was taken, along with another male slave named Sam Harper.

Brown's group then went to the home of Isaac Larue and at gunpoint took several slaves consisting of Sam Harper's mother, little sisters, little brother, and an unrelated male slave. Simultaneously, the group led by Kagi and Colonel Whipple (Aaron Dwight Stevens) raided the home of David Cruise and took a slave named Jane, with Whipple killing Cruise in the process. The two groups met and headed for Kansas with their eleven fugitives. For weeks, the escaping slaves were hidden, receiving aid at various locations in northeast Kansas. Mrs. Daniels gave birth to a son, who was named after John Brown.

In early 1859, the group of twelve were led north through Nebraska. In February 1859, they stayed at the cabin of John Kagi's sister, Barbara Mayhew. The group was continually hounded by an armed posse. Despite a posse attempting to take John Kagi at his sister's cabin, they made it safely across the river into Iowa and then eventually reached freedom in Windsor, Ontario, Canada on March 12, 1859.

The twelve consisted of the eleven slaves plus one child born during the trek, in three families: the Harper family, the Daniels family, and one unrelated male.

According to the National Park Service:

The Mayhew Cabin was built in 1855 from hand hewn cottonwood trees and served as the home of the Mayhew family until 1864, when the cabin and surrounding property were first sold. The property continued to change hands through the end of the 19th century until 1937, when owner Edward Bartling had the cabin moved to prevent its destruction by a highway project. During the move, the cabin underwent restoration, exposing its original 1850s exterior materials. The authentic "old fashioned" look facilitated Bartling’s desire to open the cabin to the public and develop his property as a tourist park. In addition to restoring the cabin, Bartling had a cave built underneath the cabin to help interpret the Mayhew family’s rumored association with the Underground Railroad. The cave consists of a cellar and connecting tunnels, sleeping quarters, and a tunnel exiting to a nearby ravine. The cabin remained open to the public from 1938 to 2002 as the John Brown’s Cave tourist attraction.

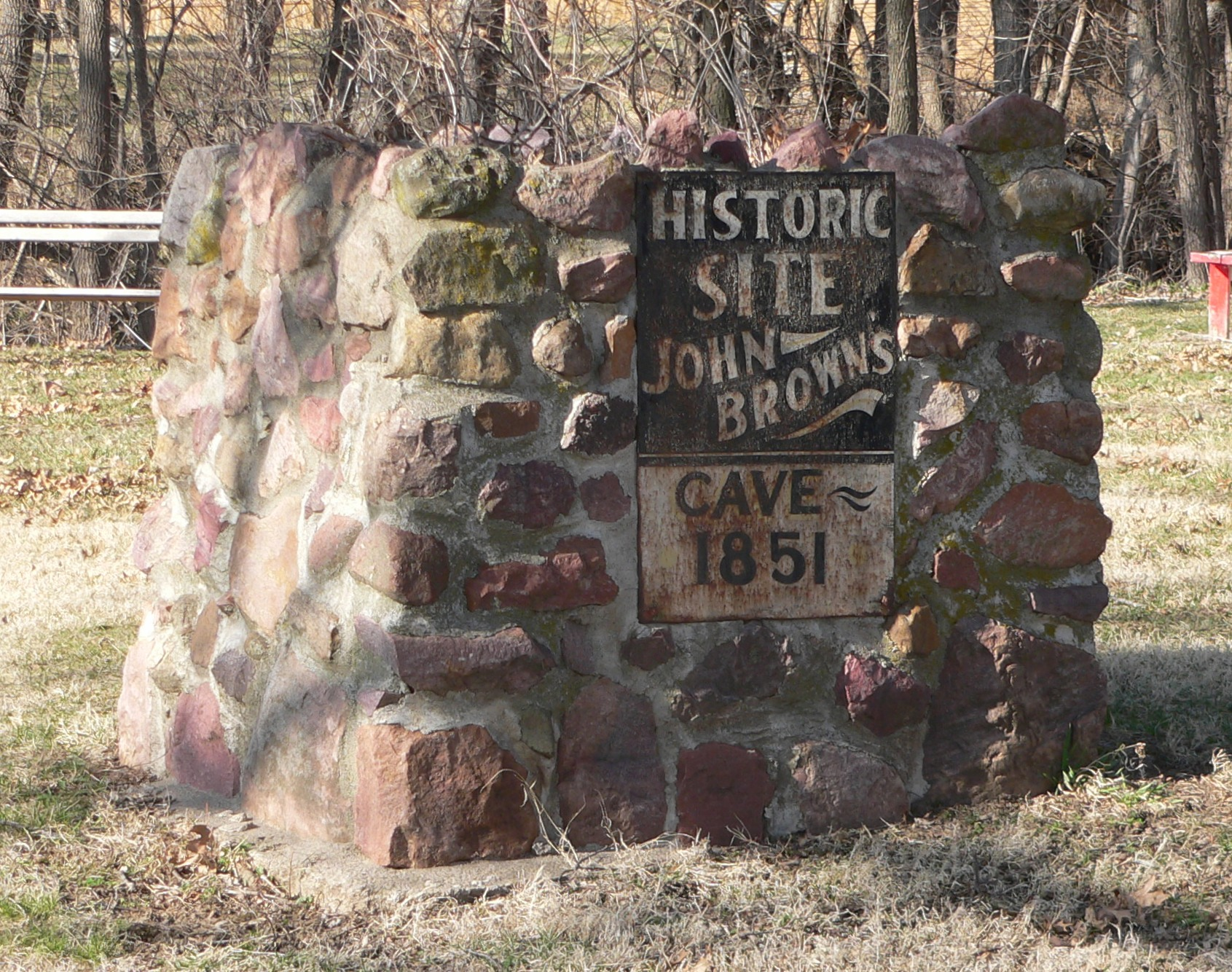
"John Brown's Cave" sign near cabin

There is no proof that the cave was ever used by people escaping slavery, or that John Brown had ever been on the premises.

The building was listed on the U.S. National Register of Historic Places on February 11, 2010. The listing was announced as the featured listing in the National Park Service's weekly list of February 18, 2011.

== Restoration ==
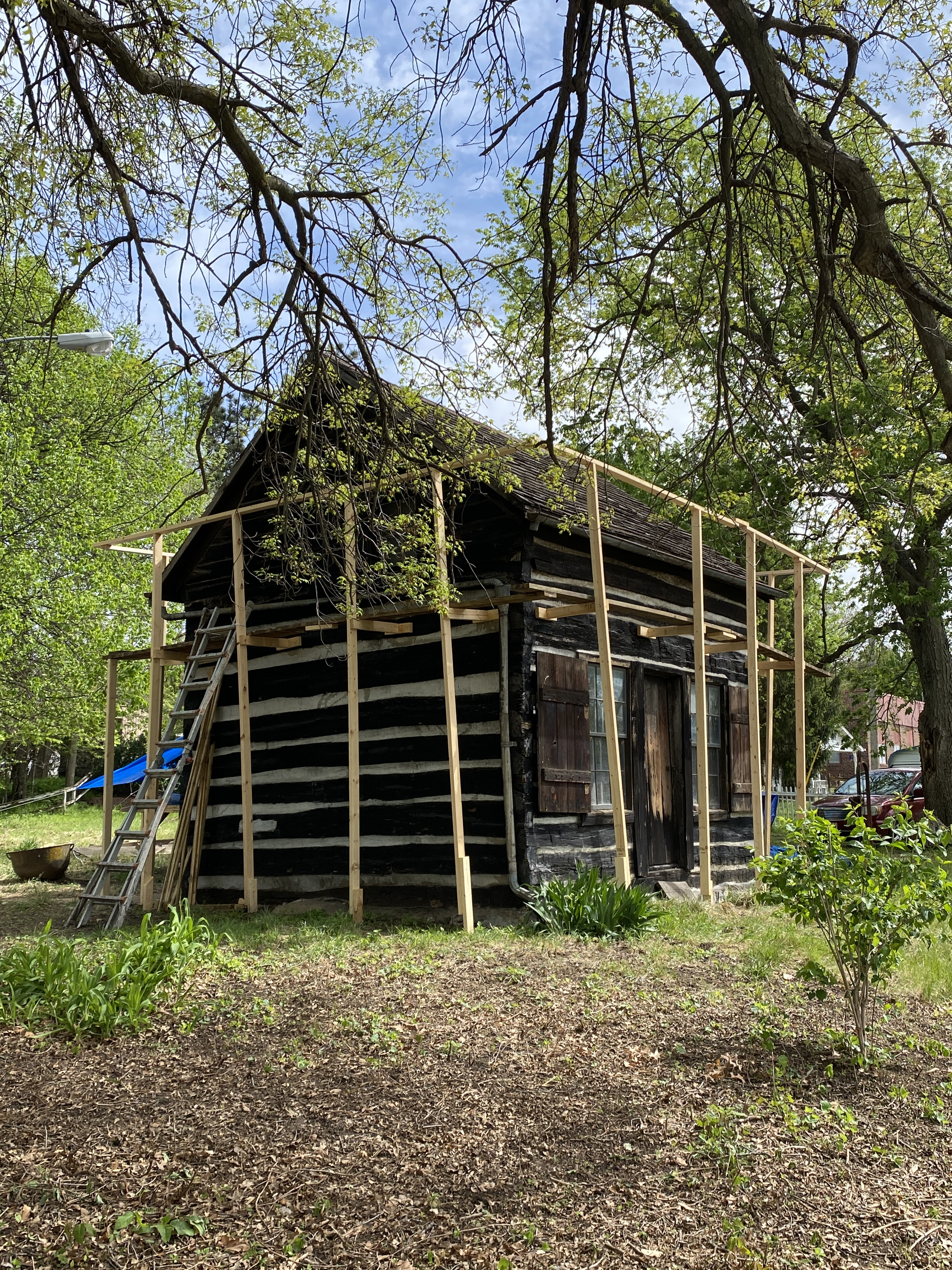
Restoration work being done on Mayhew Cabin in April 2026

In 2005 the Mayhew Cabin was restored and the site began operating as a non-profit foundation. The foundation acquired a new museum space in 2010 just to the west of the Mayhew Cabin. The foundation also maintains on the site an historic Mt. Zion AME Church, one of the first black congregations established west of the Missouri River.

In 2019, flooding damaged the 20-acre site and it was closed to the public. Since then, the board of directors has been fundraising to restore the site and reopen the grounds.

== See also ==
- History of slavery in Nebraska
- Nebraska Territory
- Underground Railroad
