= Fillmore Western Railway =

The Fillmore Western Railway was a small railroad that operated in central Nebraska. According to a map created by the Nebraska Department of Roads in 1999, the railroad operated mainly in Fillmore County, Nebraska, but the railroad's mailing address was 2202 East 7th Street, Fremont, Nebraska. Operations ended in 1999.
