= Atchison, Lincoln and Columbus Railroad =

The Atchison, Lincoln and Columbus Railroad was initially authorized to build from the terminus point of the Atchison and Nebraska Railroad, which was at the Nebraska and Kansas border North of White Cloud, Kansas, to Columbus, Nebraska by way of Lincoln. Work began in 1871 and the Atchison and Nebraska Railroad absorbed the Atchison, Lincoln and Columbus Railroad on November 3, 1871. The railroad reached Lincoln by 1872. In January 1880, the railroad was purchased by the Burlington and Missouri River Railroad which was itself had been purchased Chicago, Burlington and Quincy Railroad in 1872.
