= Omaha, Lincoln and Beatrice Railway =

Railway in Nebraska, US

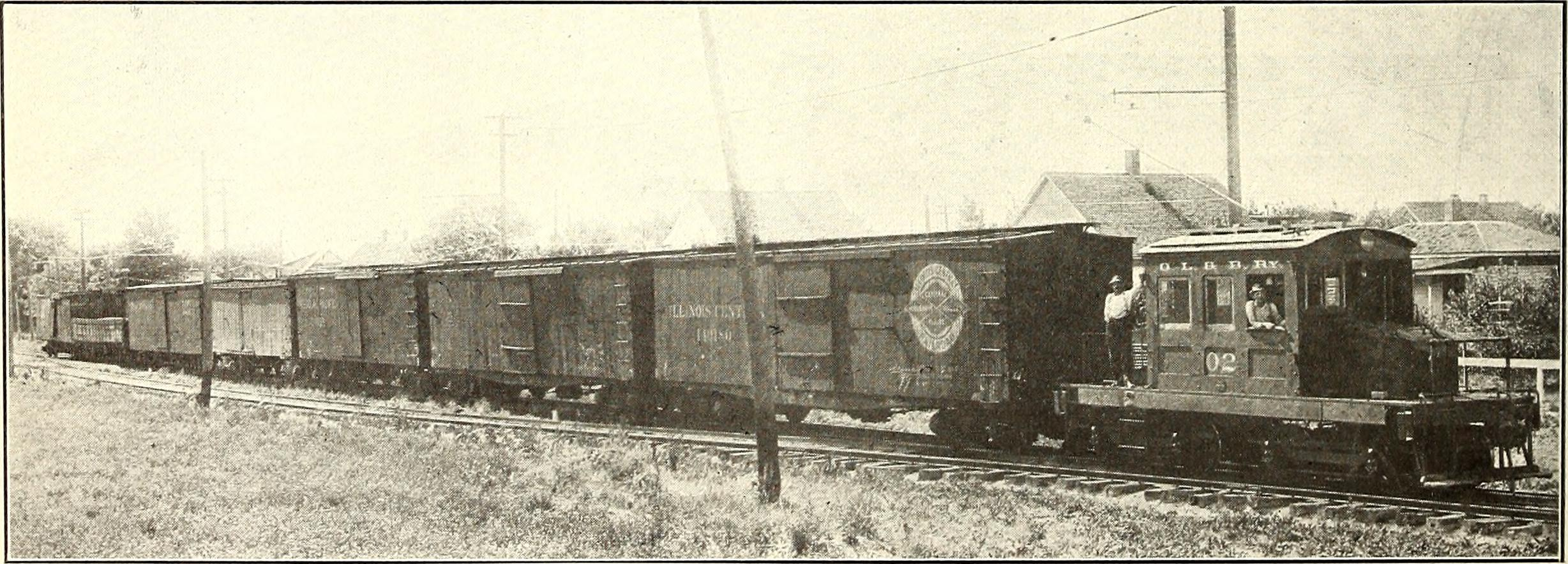
- Electric locomotive of Omaha, Lincoln & Beatrice Railway hauling freight cars

Overview
- Headquarters: Lincoln, Nebraska
- Reporting mark: OLB
- Locale: Lincoln, Nebraska
- Dates of operation: 1903–

Technical
- Track gauge: 4 ft 8 1/2 in (1,435 mm) standard gauge
- Length: 2.5 miles (4.0 km)

Other
- Website: www.olbrailway.com

The Omaha, Lincoln and Beatrice Railway (reporting mark OLB), "The Big Red Line", was founded in 1903 as an attempt to carry passengers between the three Nebraska cities. Although it never extended outside Lincoln, the OL&B currently exists as a Class III switching railroad in Lincoln. It has been owned by NEBCO, Inc. since 1929.

== Operations ==
OL&B loads grain for ADM and Ag Processing Inc, delivers lumber to Lincoln Lumber Company, and interchanges between BNSF and Union Pacific. They also operate a shop for car repairs and provide mobile car repair and track maintenance.

== Known customers ==
Customers of the railway included:

- Lincoln Lumber Company
  - Lincoln Lumber sits on what is left of the Union-Lincoln branch of the Missouri Pacific Railway. It was purchased from Union Pacific around the year 2001. Currently due to the condition of the track, OL&B will only run locomotive #12 down this stretch of track due to weight concerns of their GP 38-3 #47. Lincoln Lumber owns the trackage
- ADM Farmland
- Ag Processing Inc.
- Snyder Industries
- Ready Mixed Concrete Co (owned by parent company NEBCO)

== Roster ==
Roster number	Locomotive type	Year acquired	Notes and history
12	RL1500	Circa 1990	Formerly CRIP SW1200 #926. Rebuilt by Republic Locomotive and delivered to OL&B around 1990. Initially numbered 47 for parent company owner George Abel, who played football for the Nebraska Cornhuskers in the early 1940s, and is the first RL1500 made. It was renumbered to 12 in 2015 after the railway received a new No. 47 from Western Rail Inc rebuilt from WRIX 3507 (GP35m) into a GP38–3 with 2,000 HP, a 500 HP increase over the RL1500 they had been using. It now is used as backup in Lincoln.
47	GP38-3	2015	Started life as SP 7764. Rebuilt by Western Rail Inc in 2015 to GP38-3 standards. De-turbocharged, now generates 2,000 horsepower. (Pictures of OLB 47 at RR Picture Archives)
101	GE 44 Tonner		Built in 12/1950 according to RR Picture Archives. Currently sits stored next to Ready Mixed Concrete on Y Street in Lincoln, NE. Was the former primary power in Lincoln. Once OL&B acquired 102, it then moved to Western Sand and Gravel north of Ashland, NE and operated there moving aggregates that would then be moved to Lincoln by what is now BNSF and turned back to OL&B for Ready Mixed Concrete. Upon acquiring the first 47 (now 12) to be primary power in Lincoln, 102 took its place as Western Sand and Gravel and 101 came to Lincoln for storage. (Pictures of OLB 101 at RR Picture Archives)
102	GE 70 Tonner		Built October 1951 according to RR Picture Archives. Formerly Sioux City Terminal 2. Currently serving Western Sand and Gravel north of Ashland, NE moving aggregates around the property. (Pictures of OLB 102 at RR Picture Archives)
