= Atchison and Nebraska Railroad =

Railroad in Kansas and Nebraska, US

Overview
- Locale: Kansas and Nebraska (United States)
- Dates of operation: 1869–1908
- Successor: Chicago, Burlington and Quincy Railroad

Technical
- Track gauge: 4 ft 8 1/2 in (1,435 mm) standard gauge

The Atchison and Nebraska Railroad was a railroad company in the states of Kansas and Nebraska, United States.

It was initially chartered on December 8, 1865, as the Atchison and Nebraska City Railroad but "City" was dropped from the name when it was formally organized in 1869. The charter authorized the railroad to be built from Atchison, Kansas, to some point on the Nebraska/Kansas border, not farther west than 25 miles (40 km) from the Missouri River. Work began on the railroad in Atchison in the summer of 1869 and it was completed to the state line, three miles (5 km) north of White Cloud, Kansas, in 1871. On November 3, 1871, the railroad absorbed the Atchison, Lincoln and Columbus Railroad, and completed building the railroad north into Lincoln, Nebraska, by the fall of 1872.

On January 24, 1908, a special meeting of stockholders in the A&N was held to discuss the sale of the railroad to the Chicago, Burlington and Quincy Railroad. The A&N property was transferred to the Burlington on February 24, 1908.
