= Atkinson and Northern Railroad =

The Atkinson and Northern Railroad was founded in the late 19th century to operate north from Atkinson, Nebraska, for about 25-30 miles to Perry in Boyd County, Nebraska. Although several cuts were made in preparation for the railroad, no track was laid and the railroad folded before it began.

The line was proposed as a way to get grain from the farms in Holt and Boyd counties to market. Articles of incorporation were filed in 1898 with the company headquarters situated in Atkinson. A bond vote for $10,000 towards the line's construction in October 1898 by the residents of Atkinson, failed. But construction contracts were arranged in early March 1899, and construction began on April 13, 1899, which led to some land speculation in the town of Atkinson. By the end of April, 8 miles of the line had been graded. In the next month, the railroad and construction contractors paid $8,000 to the crews working on the line, and construction continued without any bonds being issued, reassuring the local residents that the line would be completed. Promoters for the railroad company had suggested that trains would be running on the line as early as July 1899. In 1900, extensions and branches to Cedar Rapids and Lynch were proposed. Construction stalled and a new company was formed to take over the railroad in 1901, hoping to build it to completion as a narrow-gauge railway.
