= Midland Pacific Railway =

Erstwhile railroad operating in the Nebraska counties

The Midland Pacific Railway was a railroad operating in the Nebraska counties of Lancaster, Nemaha, Otoe, Seward, and York.

== History ==
Prior to statehood, Nebraska City and Omaha vied for economic and political dominance in the Nebraska Territory. In the 1850s and early 1860s, Nebraska City had been the eastern terminus of the Platte Valley freight line. However, when the Union Pacific rail line built westward from Omaha, Nebraska City lost much of its business.

In an effort to regain its advantage, the businessmen of Nebraska City organized the Midland Pacific Railway Company. By 1870, the company had raised $50,000 in Nebraska City to grade the first ten miles of track. The rail line was awarded a land grant by the State of Nebraska and a bond from Otoe County. The railroad was to generally follow the path of the Platte Valley line, however, in a bid to increase its influence, the Midland Pacific line would connect to the nearby newly-founded state capital, Lincoln. Excited by the prospect of a railway, Lancaster County voted for a bond granting $50,000 to Midland Pacific Railway. However, the bond was deemed insufficient and Midland Pacific asked Lancaster County for an additional $150,000. Midland Pacific organized numerous mass-meetings in Lincoln to keep the public interested and supportive of the railroad, at one point threatening to bypass Lincoln entirely if Lancaster County would not supply it with the $150,000.

After much local fundraising, spurred on by articles in the Nebraska State Journal urging citizens to do their part, the bond issue was passed and Midland Pacific built into the new capital city of Lincoln on April 22, 1871. In 1875, it merged with the Brownville, Fort Kearney and Pacific Rail Road to form the Nebraska Railway.

== See also ==
- List of defunct Nebraska railroads
- History of Nebraska
- Nebraska City, Nebraska
- History of rail transport in the United States
- Lincoln, Nebraska
- Omaha, Nebraska
