= Nebraska City, Nebraska =

- City
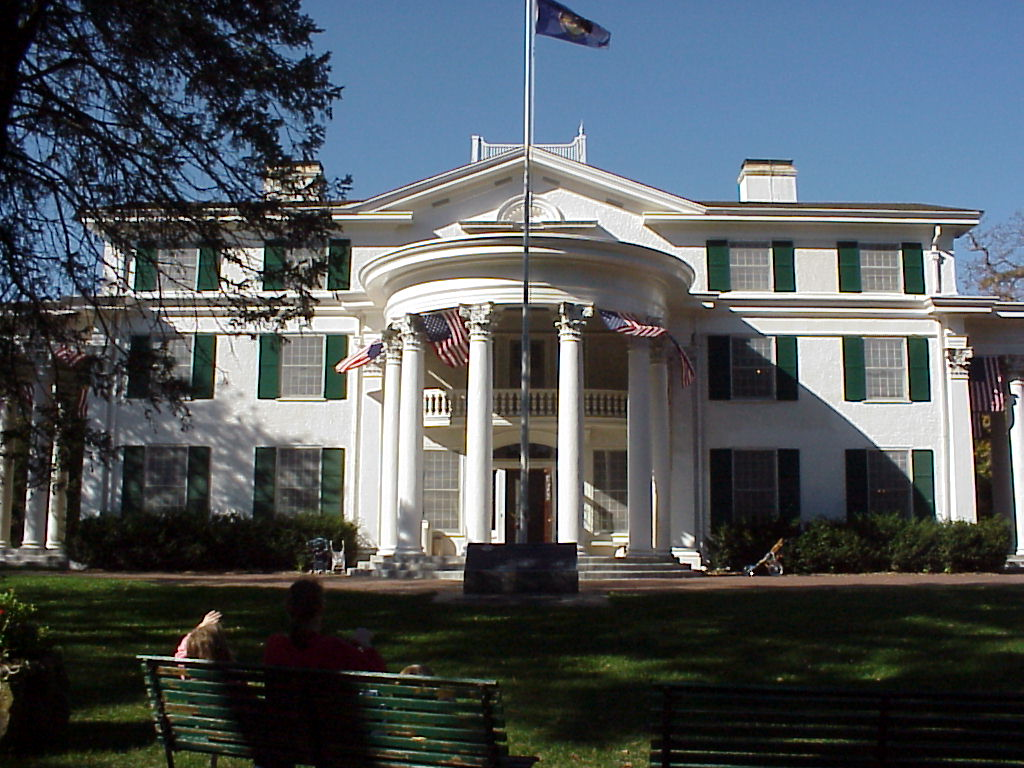
- Arbor Lodge State Historical Park, 2012

- Logo

- Location of Nebraska City, Nebraska
- Coordinates: 40°40′33″N 95°51′42″W
- Country: United States
- State: Nebraska
- County: Otoe

Government
  - Type: Mayor-Bryan Bequette Commission

Area
  - Total: 4.97 sq mi (12.88 km^{2})
  - Land: 4.97 sq mi (12.88 km^{2})
  - Water: 0 sq mi (0.00 km^{2})
- Elevation: 1,043 ft (318 m)

Population (2020)
  - Total: 7,222
  - Density: 1,452.3/sq mi (560.73/km^{2})
- Time zone: UTC-6 (Central (CST))
  - Summer (DST): UTC-5 (CDT)
- ZIP code: 68410
- Area code: 402
- FIPS code: 31-33705
- GNIS feature ID: 2395162
- Website: nebraskacityne.gov

Nebraska City is a city in and the county seat of Otoe County, Nebraska, United States. As of the 2020 census, the city population was 7,222.

The Nebraska State Legislature has credited Nebraska City as being the oldest incorporated city in the state, as it was the first approved by a special act of the Nebraska Territorial Legislature in 1855.

Nebraska City is the home of Arbor Day, the Missouri River Basin Lewis and Clark Center (which focuses on the natural history achievements of the expedition), and the Mayhew Cabin, the only site in the state recognized by the National Park Service as a station on the Underground Railroad.

== History ==
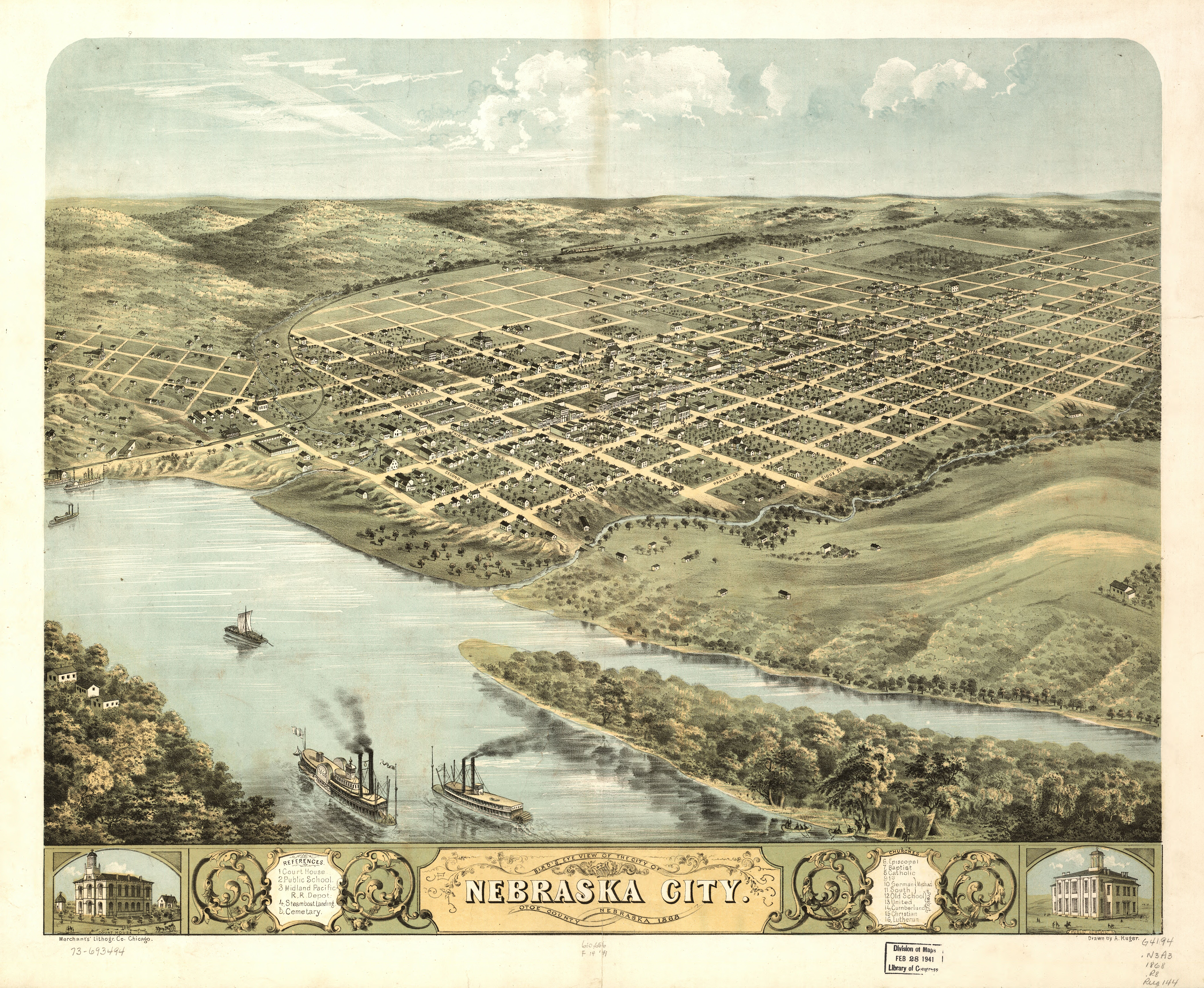
Bird's eye view of Nebraska City, 1868

Early European-American official exploration was reported in 1804 by Lewis and Clark as they journeyed west along the Missouri River. They encountered many of the historic Native American tribes whose ancestors had inhabited the territory for thousands of years, including the Oto-Missouria, Omaha, and Pawnee Indians.

During the years of early pioneer settlement, in 1846 the US Army built Old Fort Kearny at Nebraska City. Several years later, the army abandoned it to relocate the fort to central Nebraska, now south of present-day Kearney.

Shortly after the post was vacated, John Boulware developed an important river-crossing and ferry service from Iowa to present-day Nebraska City. He and his father expanded their business and in 1852 or 1853 built a ferry house, the first residence in Nebraska City.

In 1854 the Kansas–Nebraska Act allowed legal settlement in the regional area. Three townships were incorporated by settlers including Stephen Nuckolls, one of the co-founders of Nebraska City. Nebraska City and Kearney City were incorporated in 1855, and South Nebraska City was incorporated in 1856. During those years, Nebraska City competed fiercely to become the Nebraska Territory capital. On December 31, 1857, these three town sites along with Prairie City joined, incorporating as present-day Nebraska City. Before the American Civil War, Nebraska City was noted as having the Territory's largest population of slaves. Many worked on the riverfront as laborers, involved with moving freight and luggage associated with steamboat traffic.

By the mid-19th century, steamboats on the Missouri River were the vitalizing force behind Nebraska City's growth, bringing commerce, people and freight to the west. In the spring of 1858 Russell, Majors and Waddell started freighting from Nebraska City on a government contract to transport all provisions for all western forts. The supplies were brought up the Missouri River by steamboat and then taken out by wagon train. Nebraska City's favorable position (with a gradual slope from the river to the table land above) and good trail made it an important link to the west.

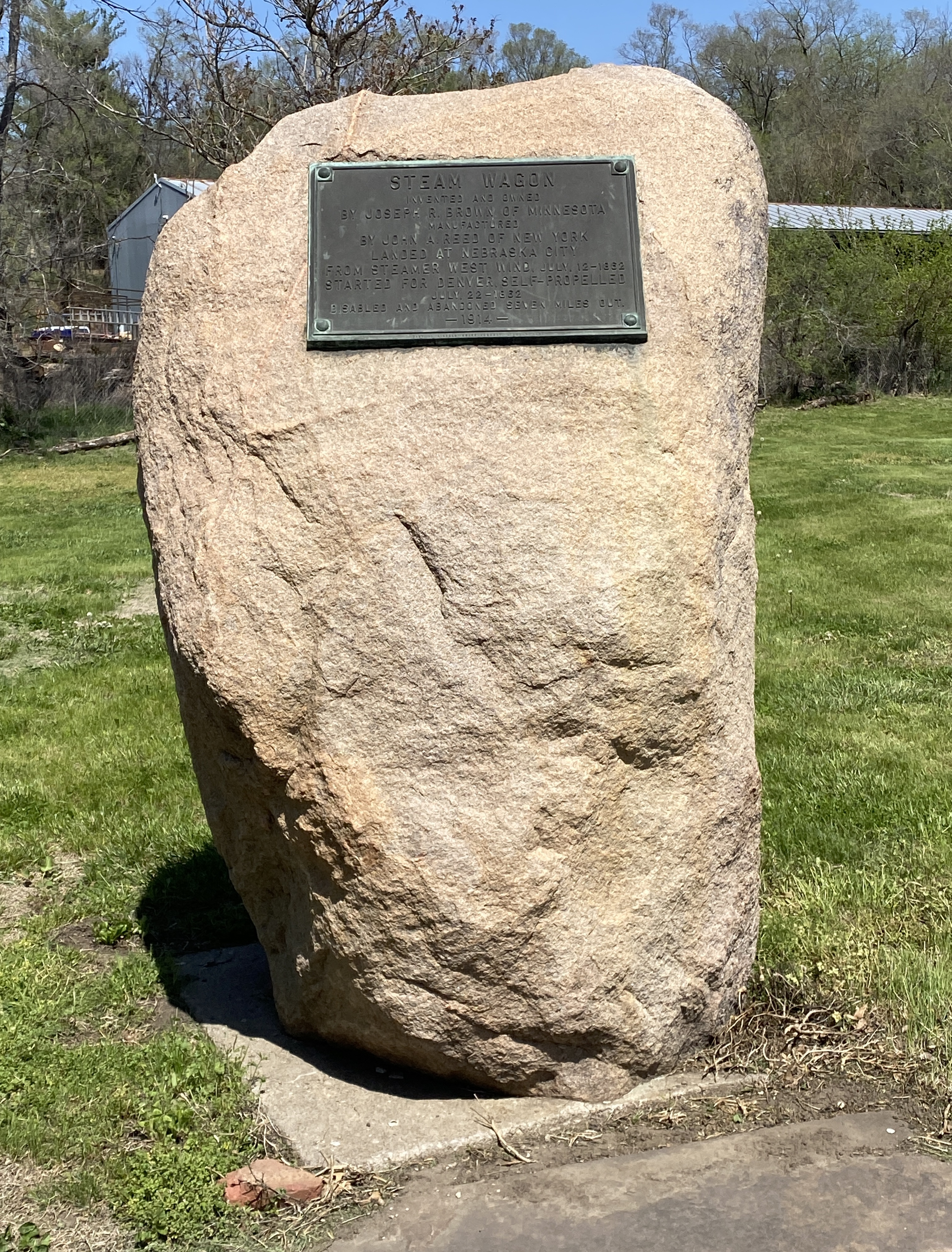
Steam wagon historical marker, 2026

Since that beginning, the city became established as a regional transportation, economic, and agriculture hub for the three state area. Additional forms of transportation were important, including the steam wagon and the first locomotive engine of the Midland Pacific.

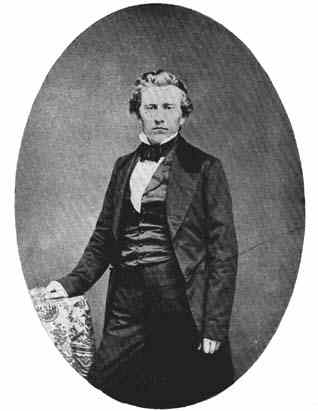
J. Sterling Morton, ca. 1858

J. Sterling Morton came to Nebraska City in 1855 to edit the Nebraska City News. Originally from Michigan, he and his wife Caroline were lovers of nature. Morton served as Secretary of Agriculture under President Grover Cleveland’s administration and in 1872 he was instrumental in establishing the annual tree planting day, Arbor Day. Governor Robert Furnas of Nebraska issued the first Arbor Day Proclamation on March 31, 1874. The holiday is celebrated around the world.

Nebraska City has its own hospital, St Marys Hospital. As the county seat, it has the courthouse and associated county offices.

== Geography ==
Nebraska City is located on the western bank of the Missouri River. According to the United States Census Bureau, the city has a total area of 4.69 square miles (12.15 km^{2}), all land.

=== Climate ===
Climate data for Nebraska City, Nebraska (1991–2020 normals, extremes 1961–present)
| Month | Jan | Feb | Mar | Apr | May | Jun | Jul | Aug | Sep | Oct | Nov | Dec | Year |
|---|---|---|---|---|---|---|---|---|---|---|---|---|---|
| Record high °F (°C) | 71 (22) | 77 (25) | 89 (32) | 95 (35) | 98 (37) | 106 (41) | 109 (43) | 106 (41) | 102 (39) | 93 (34) | 83 (28) | 73 (23) | 109 (43) |
| Mean maximum °F (°C) | 57.4 (14.1) | 63.0 (17.2) | 76.7 (24.8) | 85.7 (29.8) | 90.4 (32.4) | 93.6 (34.2) | 96.6 (35.9) | 95.7 (35.4) | 92.6 (33.7) | 86.7 (30.4) | 73.1 (22.8) | 60.7 (15.9) | 97.2 (36.2) |
| Mean daily maximum °F (°C) | 33.6 (0.9) | 38.9 (3.8) | 51.8 (11.0) | 63.8 (17.7) | 73.8 (23.2) | 83.1 (28.4) | 86.6 (30.3) | 85.0 (29.4) | 78.7 (25.9) | 66.2 (19.0) | 51.0 (10.6) | 38.3 (3.5) | 62.6 (17.0) |
| Daily mean °F (°C) | 23.7 (−4.6) | 28.3 (−2.1) | 40.2 (4.6) | 51.4 (10.8) | 62.4 (16.9) | 72.2 (22.3) | 76.1 (24.5) | 73.9 (23.3) | 66.2 (19.0) | 53.7 (12.1) | 40.0 (4.4) | 28.7 (−1.8) | 51.4 (10.8) |
| Mean daily minimum °F (°C) | 13.7 (−10.2) | 17.6 (−8.0) | 28.5 (−1.9) | 39.0 (3.9) | 51.1 (10.6) | 61.3 (16.3) | 65.6 (18.7) | 62.8 (17.1) | 53.7 (12.1) | 41.3 (5.2) | 29.0 (−1.7) | 19.1 (−7.2) | 40.2 (4.6) |
| Mean minimum °F (°C) | −6.0 (−21.1) | 0.2 (−17.7) | 9.5 (−12.5) | 25.3 (−3.7) | 37.9 (3.3) | 50.4 (10.2) | 55.9 (13.3) | 52.9 (11.6) | 39.7 (4.3) | 26.0 (−3.3) | 13.7 (−10.2) | 0.5 (−17.5) | −9.1 (−22.8) |
| Record low °F (°C) | −28 (−33) | −23 (−31) | −12 (−24) | 4 (−16) | 27 (−3) | 40 (4) | 41 (5) | 44 (7) | 28 (−2) | 14 (−10) | −6 (−21) | −23 (−31) | −28 (−33) |
| Average precipitation inches (mm) | 0.87 (22) | 1.12 (28) | 1.88 (48) | 3.43 (87) | 5.41 (137) | 4.88 (124) | 4.36 (111) | 2.93 (74) | 3.18 (81) | 3.02 (77) | 1.58 (40) | 1.42 (36) | 34.08 (866) |
| Average snowfall inches (cm) | 8.1 (21) | 7.2 (18) | 1.9 (4.8) | 1.1 (2.8) | 0.1 (0.25) | 0.0 (0.0) | 0.0 (0.0) | 0.0 (0.0) | 0.0 (0.0) | 0.1 (0.25) | 1.3 (3.3) | 4.2 (11) | 24.0 (61) |
| Average precipitation days (≥ 0.01 in) | 4.5 | 4.4 | 6.0 | 8.1 | 9.7 | 8.6 | 7.8 | 7.3 | 6.2 | 6.0 | 4.4 | 4.6 | 77.6 |
| Average snowy days (≥ 0.1 in) | 3.2 | 2.8 | 1.0 | 0.2 | 0.0 | 0.0 | 0.0 | 0.0 | 0.0 | 0.1 | 0.5 | 2.5 | 10.3 |
Source: NOAA

== Demographics ==
Historical population
| Census | Pop. | Note | %± |
|---|---|---|---|
| 1860 | 1,922 | | — |
| 1870 | 6,050 | | 214.8% |
| 1880 | 4,183 | | −30.9% |
| 1890 | 11,941 | | 185.5% |
| 1900 | 7,380 | | −38.2% |
| 1910 | 5,488 | | −25.6% |
| 1920 | 6,279 | | 14.4% |
| 1930 | 7,230 | | 15.1% |
| 1940 | 7,339 | | 1.5% |
| 1950 | 6,872 | | −6.4% |
| 1960 | 7,252 | | 5.5% |
| 1970 | 7,441 | | 2.6% |
| 1980 | 7,127 | | −4.2% |
| 1990 | 6,547 | | −8.1% |
| 2000 | 7,228 | | 10.4% |
| 2010 | 7,289 | | 0.8% |
| 2020 | 7,222 | | −0.9% |
U.S. Decennial Census; 2013 Estimate

=== 2020 census ===
As of the 2020 census, Nebraska City had a population of 7,222. The median age was 39.9 years. 24.6% of residents were under the age of 18 and 20.3% of residents were 65 years of age or older. For every 100 females there were 93.5 males, and for every 100 females age 18 and over there were 89.9 males age 18 and over.

96.9% of residents lived in urban areas, while 3.1% lived in rural areas.

There were 2,918 households in Nebraska City, of which 30.0% had children under the age of 18 living in them. Of all households, 44.4% were married-couple households, 19.1% were households with a male householder and no spouse or partner present, and 28.6% were households with a female householder and no spouse or partner present. About 31.3% of all households were made up of individuals and 13.9% had someone living alone who was 65 years of age or older.

There were 3,184 housing units, of which 8.4% were vacant. The homeowner vacancy rate was 2.8% and the rental vacancy rate was 9.0%.

Racial composition as of the 2020 census
| Race | Number | Percent |
|---|---|---|
| White | 6,015 | 83.3% |
| Black or African American | 66 | 0.9% |
| American Indian and Alaska Native | 55 | 0.8% |
| Asian | 61 | 0.8% |
| Native Hawaiian and Other Pacific Islander | 0 | 0.0% |
| Some other race | 490 | 6.8% |
| Two or more races | 535 | 7.4% |
| Hispanic or Latino (of any race) | 1,044 | 14.5% |

=== 2010 census ===
As of the census of 2010, there were 7,289 people, 2,960 households, and 1,867 families residing in the city. The population density was 1,554.2 inhabitants per square mile (600.1/km^{2}). There were 3,265 housing units at an average density of 696.2 units per square mile (268.8 units/km^{2}). The racial makeup of the city was 91.5% White, 0.4% African American, 0.3% Native American, 0.7% Asian, 0.2% Pacific Islander, 5.3% from other races, and 1.6% from two or more races. Hispanic or Latino of any race were 10.9% of the population.

There were 2,960 households, of which 30.7% had children under the age of 18 living with them, 46.1% were married couples living together, 11.6% had a female householder with no husband present, 5.3% had a male householder with no wife present, and 36.9% were non-families. 31.5% of all households were made up of individuals, and 15.9% had someone living alone who was 65 years of age or older. The average household size was 2.37 and the average family size was 2.97.

The median age in the city was 40.9 years. 24.4% of residents were under the age of 18; 7.6% were between the ages of 18 and 24; 22% were from 25 to 44; 26.2% were from 45 to 64; and 19.7% were 65 years of age or older. The gender makeup of the city was 47.3% male and 52.7% female.

=== 2000 census ===
As of the census of 2000, there were 7,228 people, 2,898 households, and 1,872 families residing in the city. The population density was 1,633.6 inhabitants per square mile (630.7/km^{2}). There were 3,154 housing units at an average density of 712.8 units per square mile (275.2 units/km^{2}). The racial makeup of the city was 96.00% White, 0.37% African American, 0.30% Native American, 0.37% Asian, 0.07% Pacific Islander, 2.01% from other races, and 0.87% from two or more races. Hispanic or Latino of any race were 4.40% of the population.

There were 2,898 households, out of which 31.0% had children under the age of 18 living with them, 51.3% were married couples living together, 10.2% had a female householder with no husband present, and 35.4% were non-families. 30.7% of all households were made up of individuals, and 16.1% had someone living alone who was 65 years of age or older. The average household size was 2.40 and the average family size was 3.01.

In the city, the population was spread out, with 25.8% under the age of 18, 7.4% from 18 to 24, 25.4% from 25 to 44, 22.3% from 45 to 64, and 19.0% who were 65 years of age or older. The median age was 39 years. For every 100 females, there were 89.9 males. For every 100 females age 18 and over, there were 85.0 males.

As of 2000 the median income for a household in the city was $34,952, and the median income for a family was $42,860. Males had a median income of $29,507 versus $19,859 for females. The per capita income for the city was $16,969. About 6.3% of families and 9.3% of the population were below the poverty line, including 12.0% of those under age 18 and 7.7% of those age 65 or over.

== Arts and culture ==
=== Events ===
Nebraska City is known as "The Home of Arbor Day". In Nebraska City is Arbor Lodge, home of the first Secretary of Agriculture of the United States, J. Sterling Morton, who promoted the planting of trees on the prairie for shade, fruit, and windbreaks. An Arbor Day Parade and weekend-long festival takes places annually at the end of April. The Arbor Day Foundation has its headquarters in the nearby city of Lincoln, Nebraska.

Each year, the AppleJack Festival in Nebraska City takes place on the third weekend of September. The event has been held for over 40 years. It includes such events as a parade, a classic car show, carnival rides, the AppleJack Fun Run/Walk, a quilt show, and craft shows and events all around the city and surrounding area. In 2011, a turnout of 40–50,000 visitors was expected.

=== Museums ===
Nebraska City is home to many museums, including the Arbor Lodge State Historical Park & Mansion, Civil War Veterans Museum, Kregel Windmill Factory Museum, Mayhew Cabin & John Brown's Cave, Missouri River Basin Lewis & Clark Visitor Center, Nebraska City Museum of Firefighting, Nelson House, Old Freighters Museum, and the Wildwood Historic Center. Many museums are open odd hours because there are not enough people to work them.

== Government ==
Nebraska City has a mayor-commission government system. Nebraska City is currently the only municipality in the State of Nebraska that has the commissioner form of government.

The Nebraska City commissioner model does not utilize representatives from precinct divisions of the city. The commissioners are elected citywide; each has a specific departmental role. These roles are: Mayor-Commissioner of Public Affairs and Public Safety, Finance Commissioner, Parks and Recreation Commissioner, Public Works Commissioner, and Streets Commissioner. Current office holders are Mayor Bryan Bequette (through December 2028); Finance Commissioner Cole Sharp (December 2026); Parks and Recreation Commissioner Patrick Wehling (December 2028); Public Works Commissioner Ron Osovski (December 2028); and Streets Commissioner Joe Chaney (December 2026).

The city is in the 1st state legislative district, as of 2022, & is represented by state senator Robert Hallstrom in the Nebraska Legislature.

== Education ==
The first high school in Nebraska was established in Nebraska City in 1864.

Nebraska City has a public and a Catholic school system. Nebraska City Public Schools offers K-12 education. The high school has an enrollment of about 445; its athletic teams are the Pioneers. It is a member of the Trailblazers Conference. Lourdes Central Catholic Schools also provides K-12 education, with a total enrollment of about 330 in all grades. Its athletic teams are the Knights, and it is a member of the Pioneer Conference.

The Nebraska Center for the Education of Children Who Are Blind or Visually Impaired was founded in 1875 and today serves students across Nebraska and western Iowa.

== Notable people ==
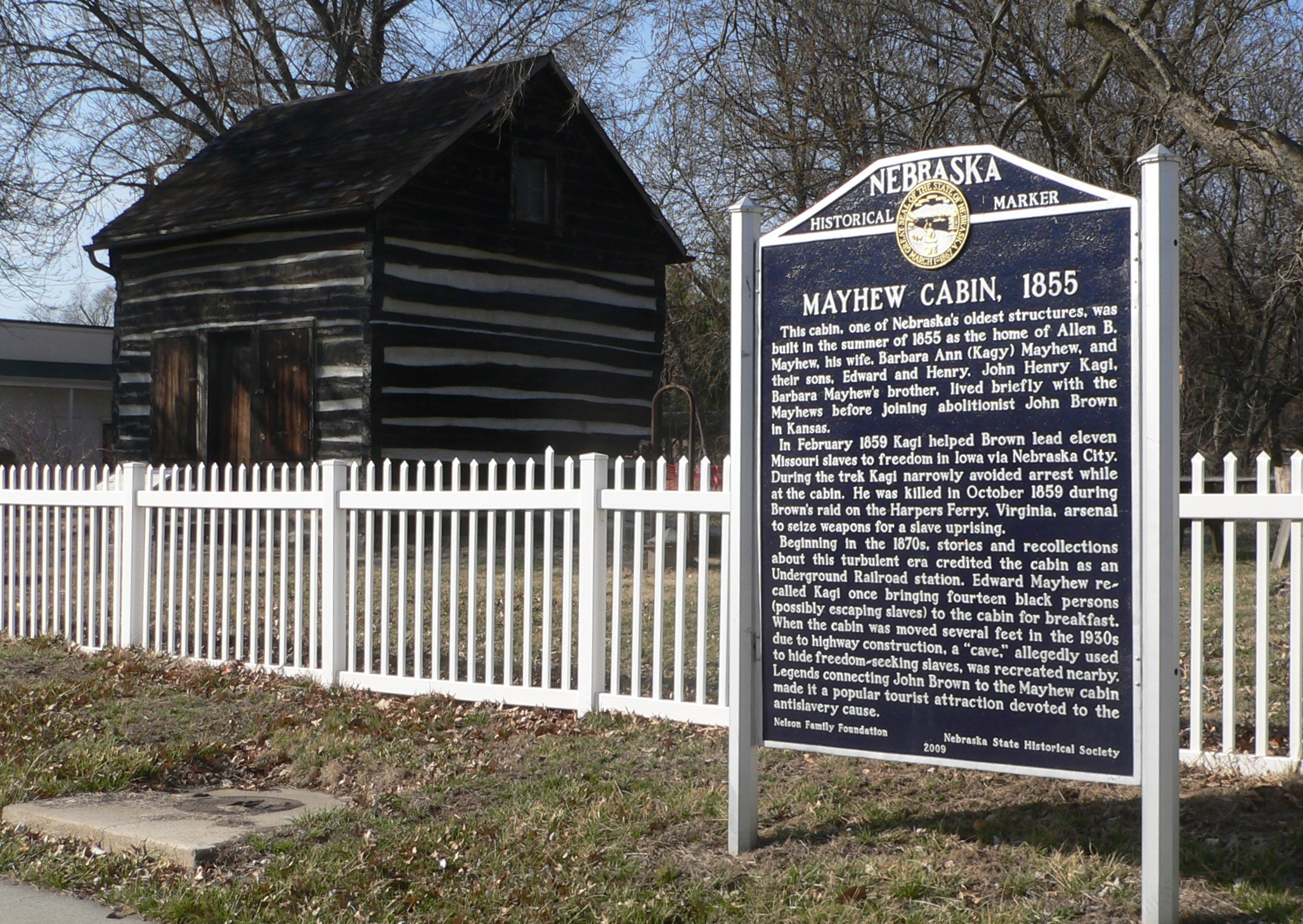
Mayhew Cabin and marker

- Bret Clark — professional football player
- Lloyd Fallers — anthropologist at University of Chicago
- Jeffrey J. Funke — Current Chief Justice of the Nebraska Supreme Court
- James Gilligan — served as director of mental health for the Massachusetts prison system and director of the Harvard Institute of Law and Psychiatry
- Leland Hayward — Hollywood and Broadway agent, theatrical producer, and father of Brooke Hayward
- William Hayward — attorney, commander of the Harlem Hellfighters during World War I, and father of Leland Hayward
- Monroe Leland Hayward — United States Senator-elect from Nebraska and father of William Hayward
- George H. Heinke — lawyer and US Congressman (1939–1940)
- John Henry Kagi — second in command in John Brown's 1859 raid on the US Arsenal at Harper's Ferry and created station at the Mayhew Cabin for the Underground Railroad
- Mitch Krenk — professional football player
- Cheri Madsen — Paralympic wheelchair racing athlete
- Joy Morton — Son of J. Sterling Morton; founder and namesake of Morton Salt
- Julius Sterling Morton — founder of Arbor Day and former US Secretary of Agriculture under President Grover Cleveland
- Paul Morton — Secretary of the Navy under Theodore Roosevelt, vice president of the Santa Fe Railroad
- Prudence Neff — pianist and music teacher
- Stephen Nuckolls — co-founder of Nebraska City
- Greg Orton — professional football player
- Adam Carter Rehmeier — film director, writer, and cinematographer best known for his work on The Bunny Game, Dinner in America, and Snack Shack
- Joe Ricketts — founder of TD Ameritrade; father of Pete Ricketts
- Pete Ricketts — governor of Nebraska and U.S. senator for Nebraska; son of Joe Ricketts
- Anthony "Lionheart" Smith — professional mixed martial artist with Strikeforce, UFC, and Bellator MMA

== See also ==
- Grand Army of the Republic Memorial Hall (Nebraska City, Nebraska)
- Kregel Windmill Factory Museum
- Morton-James Public Library
