= List of Nebraska state parks =

Nebraska State Parks: green=state park; red=state historical park.

This is a list of state parks in the U.S. state of Nebraska; the state park system is divided into state parks, state historical parks, state recreation areas and a state recreational trail. The parks are managed by the Nebraska Game and Parks Commission.

== State parks ==
| Name | County | Size | | Image | Notes |
| Name | County | acres | ha | Image | Notes |
|---|---|---|---|---|---|
| Chadron State Park | Dawes | 974.26 acres | 394.27 ha | | Nebraska's oldest state park |
| Eugene T. Mahoney State Park | Cass | 673.101 acres | 272.394 ha | | Multiple recreational and meeting facilities, fronted by the Platte River |
| Fort Robinson State Park | Dawes, Sioux | 22,332.72 acres | 9,037.73 ha | | Former U.S. Army fort |
| Indian Cave State Park | Nemaha, Richardson | 3,399.7 acres | 1,375.8 ha | | Petroglyphs; restored village of St. Deroin |
| Niobrara State Park | Knox | 1,236.59 acres | 500.43 ha | | Includes the historic Niobrara River railroad bridge |
| Platte River State Park | Cass | 452.5 acres | 183.1 ha | | Modern observation towers, vintage cabins from earlier campgrounds |
| Ponca State Park | Dixon | 2,123.63 acres | 859.40 ha | | On the banks of the Missouri River |
| Smith Falls State Park | Cherry | 265.5 acres | 107.4 ha | | Nebraska's highest waterfall |

== State historical parks ==
| Name | County | Size | | Image | Notes |
| Name | County | acres | ha | Image | Notes |
|---|---|---|---|---|---|
| Arbor Lodge State Historical Park | Otoe | 73.85 acres | 29.89 ha | | Estate of J. Sterling Morton, founder of Arbor Day. |
| Ash Hollow State Historical Park | Garden | 1,001.03 acres | 405.10 ha | | Major stopover on the Overland Trail |
| Ashfall Fossil Beds State Historical Park | Antelope | 360 acres | 150 ha | | Fossil remains at a 12-million-year-old watering hole |
| Bowring Ranch State Historical Park | Cherry | 435 acres | 176 ha | | Hereford demonstration ranch donated by former U.S. Senator Eve Bowring |
| Buffalo Bill Ranch State Historical Park | Lincoln | 24.68 acres | 9.99 ha | | Home of the famed frontier showman |
| Fort Atkinson State Historical Park | Washington | 154.36 acres | 62.47 ha | | Reconstruction of the first U.S. military post west of the Missouri River |
| Fort Hartsuff State Historical Park | Valley | 18.4 acres | 7.4 ha | | Typical infantry outpost of the 19th century Plains |
| Fort Kearny State Historical Park | Buffalo | 39.21 acres | 15.87 ha | | Partial reconstruction of fort that protected travelers of the Overland Trail |
| Rock Creek Station State Historical Park | Jefferson | 353 acres | 143 ha | | Partially reconstructed stagecoach and Pony Express station |

== State recreation areas ==
- Alexandria State Recreation Area
- Blue River State Recreation Area
- Bluestem State Recreation Area
- Box Butte Reservoir State Recreation Area
- Branched Oak State Recreation Area
- Bridgeport State Recreation Area
- Buffalo Bill Ranch State Recreation Area
- Calamus State Recreation Area
- Cheyenne State Recreation Area
- Conestoga State Recreation Area
- Cottonwood Lake State Recreation Area
- Danish Alps State Recreation Area
- Dead Timber State Recreation Area
- Enders Reservoir State Recreation Area
- Fort Kearny State Recreation Area
- Fremont Lakes State Recreation Area
- Gallagher Canyon State Recreation Area
- Johnson Lake State Recreation Area
- Keller Park State Recreation Area
- Lake Maloney State Recreation Area
- Lake McConaughy State Recreation Area
- Lake Minatare State Recreation Area
- Lake Ogallala State Recreation Area
- Lewis and Clark State Recreation Area
- Long Pine State Recreation Area
- Louisville State Recreation Area
- Medicine Creek State Recreation Area
- Memphis State Recreation Area
- Merritt Reservoir State Recreation Area
- Mormon Island State Recreation Area
- North Loup State Recreation Area
- Olive Creek State Recreation Area
- Pawnee Lake State Recreation Area
- Pelican Point State Recreation Area
- Red Willow Reservoir State Recreation Area
- Riverview Marina State Recreation Area
- Rock Creek Lake State Recreation Area
- Rock Creek Station State Recreation Area
- Rockford State Recreation Area
- Sandy Channel State Recreation Area
- Schramm Park State Recreation Area
- Sherman Reservoir State Recreation Area
- Stagecoach State Recreation Area
- Summit Lake State Recreation Area
- Sutherland Reservoir State Recreation Area
- Swanson Reservoir State Recreation Area
- Two Rivers State Recreation Area
- Union Pacific State Recreation Area
- Verdon State Recreation Area
- Victoria Springs State Recreation Area
- Wagon Train State Recreation Area
- Walgren Lake State Recreation Area
- War Axe State Recreation Area
- Wildcat Hills State Recreation Area
- Willow Creek State Recreation Area
- Windmill State Recreation Area

== State recreational trail ==
- Cowboy State Recreational Trail

== Former State Recreation Areas ==
- Arnold State Recreation Area
- Atkinson Lake State Recreation Area
- Bowman Lake State Recreation Area
- Brownville State Recreation Area
- Champion Lake State Recreation Area
- Cottonmill Lake State Recreation Area
- Crystal Lake State Recreation Area
- DLD State Recreation Area
- Long Lake State Recreation Area
- Oliver Reservoir State Recreation Area
- Pibel Lake State Recreation Area
- Pioneer State Recreation Area
