= Nebraska Crew =

University of Nebraska–Lincoln curling club team

University of Nebraska Crew Club
- Motto: Row Big Red
- Location: Lincoln, Nebraska
- Home water: Pawnee Lake
- Founded: 1971; 54 years ago
- University: University of Nebraska–Lincoln
- Website: www.unl.edu/nebcrew/

The University of Nebraska Crew Club is the collegiate rowing club team that represents the University of Nebraska–Lincoln. The men's team was founded in 1971 and the women's team in 1973.

== History ==
The club was founded in 1971 by Allan Maybee, who spent months driving across the United States to gather donated equipment. Maybee initially kept equipment in a storage facility in Mead before repurposing a former autobody repair shop in the late 1970s. The boathouse, located on campus at the corner of 16th and Y Streets, has one of the few indoor rowing tanks in the Midwest. The club is partnered with the Nebraska Game and Parks Commission and used the Branched Oak State Recreation Area as its primary training venue for decades. NCC moved to the Pawnee State Recreation Area, twelve miles west of campus, in 2021.

In its early days NCC was a frequent entry in prestigious events, including the Head of the Charles Regatta on the Charles River in Boston. When traveling to the east coast, Maybee convinced athletic director Bob Devaney to allow the crew club to borrow the red blazers normally reserved for NU's football team. The club now rarely travels outside the Midwest but competes in several regattas each year, primarily during the spring and fall semesters.

== After Nebraska ==
Lisa Rohde represented the United States in the 1984 Summer Olympics, finishing runner-up in the quadruple sculls. In 2015, university alumni George Pagano and Caitlin Miller rowed across the Atlantic Ocean in just over fifty-eight days, a record for a mixed-gender pairing.
