= Malcolm, Nebraska =

- Village
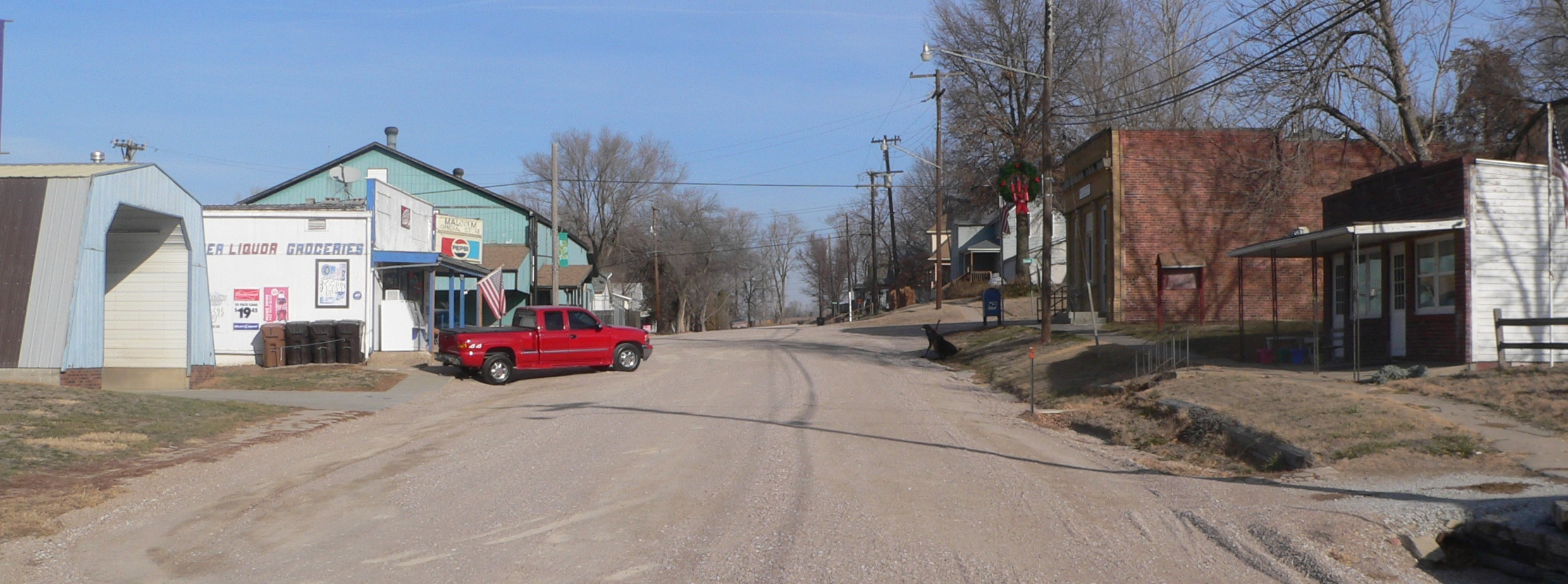
- Downtown Malcolm: Lincoln Street

- Location of Malcolm, Nebraska
- Coordinates: 40°54′33″N 96°51′58″W
- Country: United States
- State: Nebraska
- County: Lancaster

Area
  - Total: 0.15 sq mi (0.39 km^{2})
  - Land: 0.15 sq mi (0.39 km^{2})
  - Water: 0 sq mi (0.00 km^{2})
- Elevation: 1,286 ft (392 m)

Population (2020)
  - Total: 457
  - Density: 3,003.9/sq mi (1,159.82/km^{2})
- Time zone: UTC-6 (Central (CST))
  - Summer (DST): UTC-5 (CDT)
- ZIP code: 68402
- Area code: 402
- FIPS code: 31-30345
- GNIS feature ID: 2399229
- Website: http://www.malcolm.ne.gov

Malcolm is a village in Lancaster County, Nebraska, United States. It is part of the Lincoln, Nebraska Metropolitan Statistical Area. The population was 457 at the 2020 census.

== History ==
Malcolm was platted in 1877. The village was named for Malcolm Showers, the original owner of the town site. In 1880, the village was devastated by a prairie fire which burned from Middle Creek to Elk Creek which was followed by an outbreak of diphtheria which killed many local children.

In 1885, Malcolm Showers purchased two lots and built Malcolm's first church and served as its Methodist minister until he was replaced by Reverend D.Y. Black. The Malcolm Messenger, a weekly newspaper featuring a popular gossip column, was established in 1891 and was published until 1934.

== Geography ==
Malcolm is located at 40°54′27″N 96°51′56″W (40.907477, -96.865575).

According to the United States Census Bureau, the village has a total area of 0.14 square miles (0.36 km^{2}), all land.

== Demographics ==
Historical population
Census	Pop.	Note	%±
1880	53		—
1920	125		—
1930	121		−3.2%
1940	121		0.0%
1950	93		−23.1%
1960	116		24.7%
1970	132		13.8%
1980	355		168.9%
1990	181		−49.0%
2000	413		128.2%
2010	382		−7.5%
2020	457		19.6%
U.S. Decennial Census

=== 2010 census ===
As of the census of 2010, there were 382 people, 143 households, and 106 families living in the village. The population density was 2,728.6 inhabitants per square mile (1,053.5/km^{2}). There were 164 housing units at an average density of 1,171.4 per square mile (452.3/km^{2}). The racial makeup of the village was 97.4% White, 1.0% African American, 0.5% Native American, 0.3% from other races, and 0.8% from two or more races. Hispanic or Latino of any race were 0.3% of the population.

There were 143 households, of which 37.1% had children under the age of 18 living with them, 64.3% were married couples living together, 7.0% had a female householder with no husband present, 2.8% had a male householder with no wife present, and 25.9% were non-families. 17.5% of all households were made up of individuals, and 8.4% had someone living alone who was 65 years of age or older. The average household size was 2.67 and the average family size was 3.04.

The median age in the village was 38.7 years. 26.7% of residents were under the age of 18; 6.8% were between the ages of 18 and 24; 26.4% were from 25 to 44; 32.4% were from 45 to 64; and 7.6% were 65 years of age or older. The gender makeup of the village was 53.1% male and 46.9% female.

=== 2000 census ===
As of the census of 2000, there were 413 people, 139 households, and 114 families living in the village. The population density was 3,637.4 inhabitants per square mile (1,404.4/km^{2}). There were 141 housing units at an average density of 1,241.8 per square mile (479.5/km^{2}). The racial makeup of the village was 98.79% White, 0.97% Asian, and 0.24% from two or more races. Hispanic or Latino of any race were 0.48% of the population.

There were 139 households, out of which 50.4% had children under the age of 18 living with them, 64.0% were married couples living together, 15.1% had a female householder with no husband present, and 17.3% were non-families. 15.1% of all households were made up of individuals, and 2.2% had someone living alone who was 65 years of age or older. The average household size was 2.97 and the average family size was 3.25.

The median age was 32 years. The age distribution was: 33.9% under the age of 18, 9.0% from 18 to 24, 31.0% from 25 to 44, 23.2% from 45 to 64, and 2.9% at 65 years of age or older. For every 100 females, there were 106.5 males. For every 100 females age 18 and over, there were 102.2 males.

As of 2000 the median income for a household in the village was $57,188, and the median income for a family was $58,125. Males had a median income of $35,673 versus $28,125 for females. The per capita income for the village was $19,300. About 3.4% of families and 3.0% of the population were below the poverty line, including 3.1% of those under age 18 and 30.8% of those age 65 or over.

== Places of interest ==
Three and a half miles north of the village lies Branched Oak State Recreation Area, the largest of the Salt Valley Lakes. Five miles south of the village lies Pawnee Lake State Recreation Area, the second largest of the Salt Valley Lakes.

== Notable people ==
- Ken Haar (born 1943), politician
- Carol Hudkins (born 1945), politician
- Les Nunamaker (1889-1938), baseball catcher
