= Eugene T. Mahoney State Park =

Park in Nebraska, USA

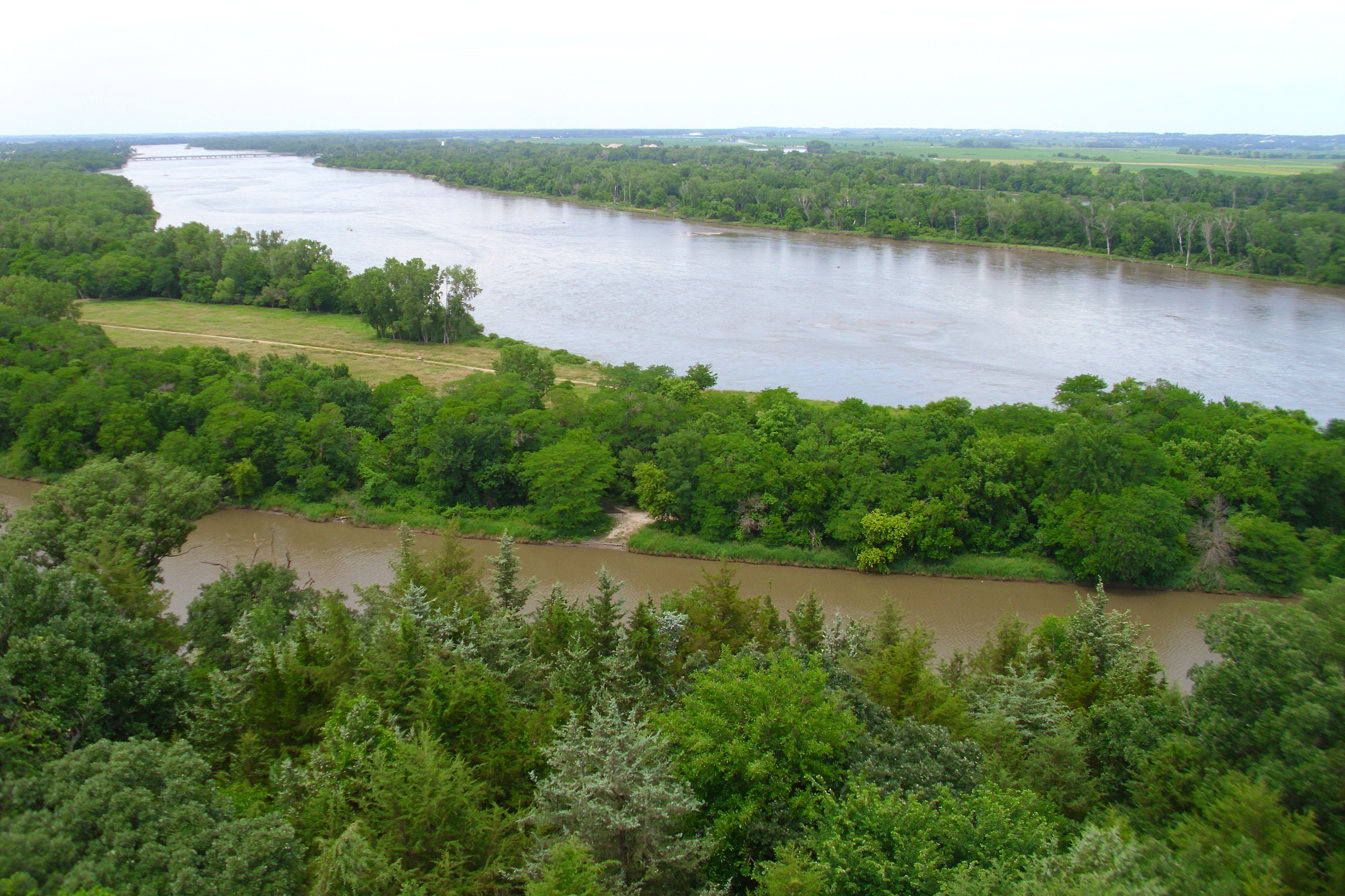
- Platte River from the observation tower

- Location within Nebraska
- Location: Cass County, Nebraska, United States
- Nearest city: Ashland, Nebraska
- Coordinates: 41°01′35″N 96°18′51″W
- Area: 673.101 acres (272.394 ha)
- Elevation: 1,191 ft (363 m)
- Established: 1985
- Administrator: Nebraska Game and Parks Commission
- Visitors: 827,372 (in 2018)
- Designation: Nebraska state park
- Website: Official website

Eugene T. Mahoney State Park is a public recreation area located on the Platte River, off Interstate 80, approximately four miles (6.4 km) east of Ashland, Nebraska. The state park features lodging and conferencing facilities, an aquatic center, marina, multi-purpose trails, the Kountze Memorial Theater, multiple facilities for event rentals, and a 70-foot (21 m) observation tower overlooking the Platte River Valley.

== History ==
Park development began with the state's purchase of the site in 1985. The park opened in 1991. It was named after Eugene T. Mahoney, a former state senator and long-time director of the Nebraska Game and Parks Commission, who is credited with reversing the fortunes of the moribund state park system during his directorship. The park bears the Mahoney family crest as its symbol and has a loop of cabins named for Ireland's County Cork, the Mahoney family's ancestral home.

== Activities and amenities ==
Park features include picnicking areas and hiking trails, horseback trail rides, fishing, a marina with paddleboat rental, miniature golf, driving range, and melodramas. Athletic facilities include an aquatic center, 18-hole disc golf course, tennis and basketball courts, softball fields, and sand volleyball. Winter activities include cross-country skiing, sledding and toboggan runs, ice fishing, and an ice skating rink. An activity center, indoor playground and activity simulators are open year-round. In 2018, the park added an outdoors high-ropes adventure course and a 42-foot climbing wall with auto- and top-rope belays and a bouldering structure in the activity center. Park lodging includes rental cabins, tent and RV camping sites, and the Peter Kiewit Lodge, which provides 40 guest rooms, conference rooms, and a restaurant.
