= NGPC =

NGPC may refer to:

- Nebraska Game and Parks Commission
- Neo Geo Pocket Color
