= Stagecoach State Recreation Area =

Recreation area in Nebraska, United States

- Location within Nebraska Location within the United States
- Location: Lancaster, Nebraska, United States
- Coordinates: 40.602672°N 96.638751°W
- Area: 802 acres (325 ha)
- Governing body: Nebraska Game and Parks Commission

Stagecoach State Recreation Area (SRA) is a state recreation area in southeastern Nebraska, United States. The recreation area surrounds the 195-acre (0.79 km^{2}) Stagecoach Lake, located approximately 20 miles (32 km) south of Lincoln. The recreation area is managed by the Nebraska Game and Parks Commission.

== See also ==
- Salt Valley Lakes
