= Virginia Smith Dam =

Dam in Nebraska, United States

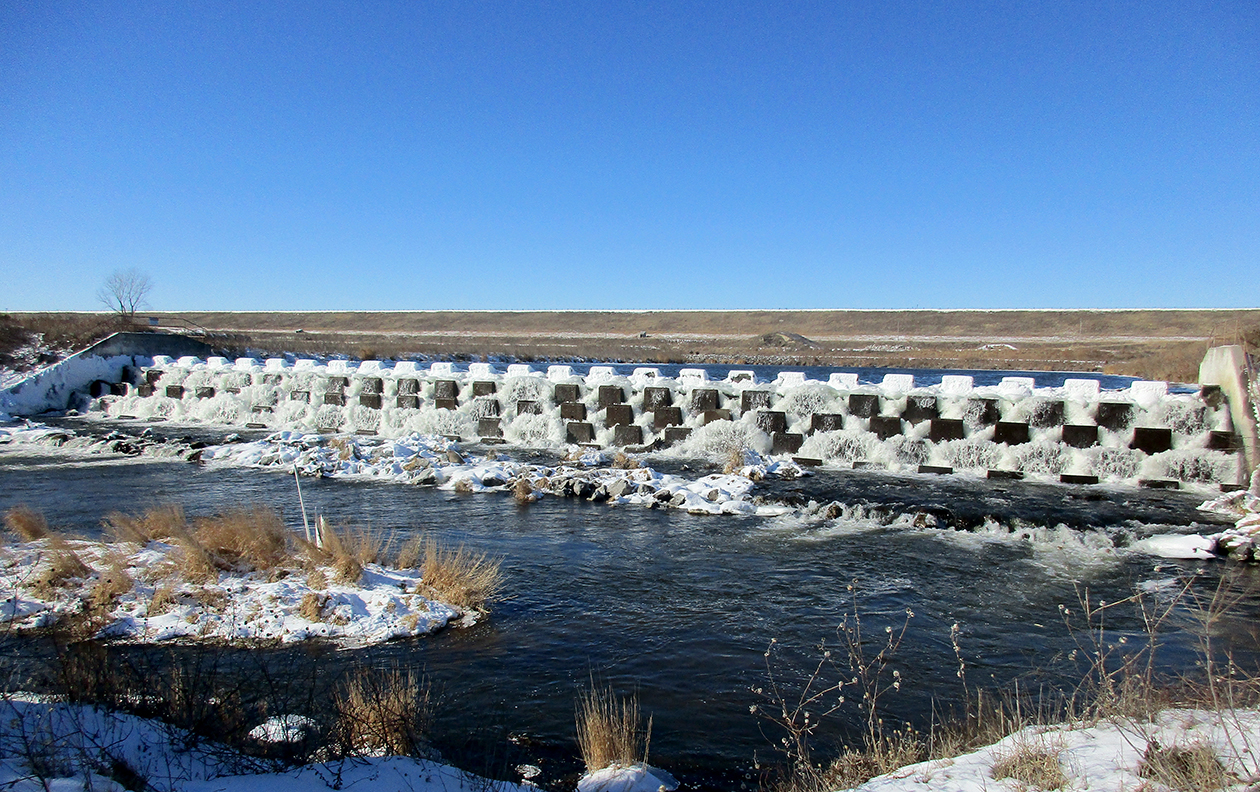

- Location within Nebraska Location within the United States
- Country: United States
- Location: Garfield County, Nebraska, United States.
- Coordinates: 41°50′00″N 99°12′00″W
- Status: Operational
- Owner: U.S. Bureau of Reclamation

Dam and spillways
- Type of dam: Embankment
- Impounds: Calamus River
- Height: 96 ft (29 m)
- Length: 5,808 ft (1,770 m)

Reservoir
- Creates: Calamus Reservoir
- Total capacity: 27,400 acre⋅ft (33,797,402 m^{3})
- Catchment area: 147 sq mi (381 km^{2})
- Surface area: 5,123 acres (2,073 ha)
- Maximum length: 10 mi (16 km)
- Normal elevation: 2,244 ft (684 m) msl
- Website; U.S. Bureau of Reclamation, Virginia Smith Dam

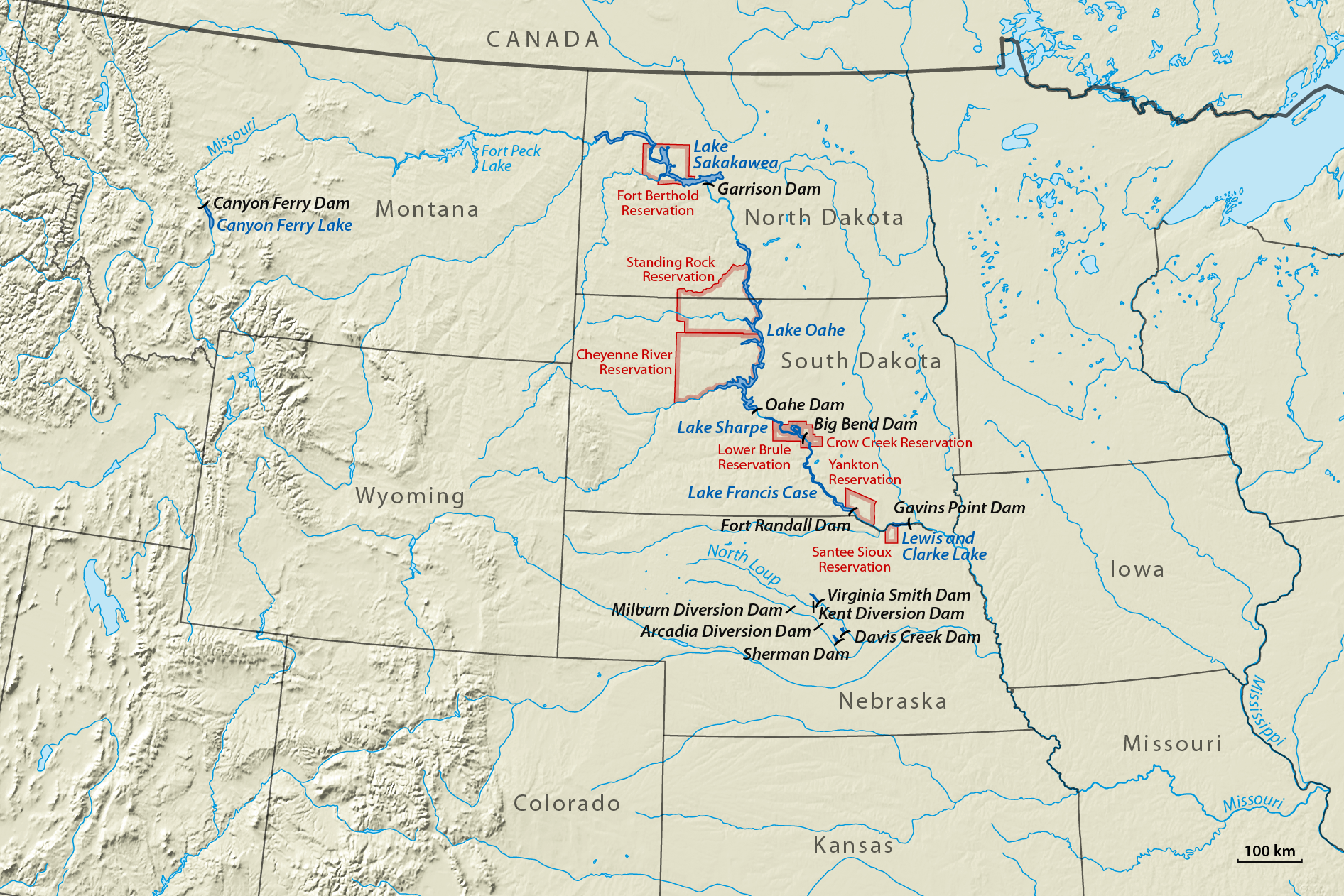
Location of Virginia Smith Dam in Nebraska. The map shows dams and reservoirs built in the Pick–Sloan Program since the 1940s

Virginia Smith Dam (also known as Calamus Dam; National ID # NE02287) is a dam in Garfield County, Nebraska, about five miles northwest of Burwell.

The earthen dam was constructed in 1985 by the United States Bureau of Reclamation with a height of 96 feet (29 m) and 5,808 feet (1,770 m) long at its crest. It impounds the Calamus River for irrigation storage and flood control, as part of the North Loup Division of the extensive, multi-state Pick–Sloan Missouri Basin Program. The dam is owned by the Bureau and is operated by the local Twin Loup Irrigation District.

The reservoir it creates, Calamus Reservoir, has a water surface of 5,142 acres (2,081 ha), 6,404 acres (2,592 ha) of land, about 31 miles (50 km) of shoreline, and a maximum capacity of 27,400 acre-feet (33,800,000 m^{3}). Recreation includes fishing (walleye, wiper, white bass, northern pike, largemouth bass, rainbow trout, and crappie, etc.), hunting, boating, camping and hiking. The reservoir is also the site of the state Calamus Reservoir State Recreation Area and Wildlife Management Area. Although the dam itself is located in Garfield County, most of the reservoir lies in Loup County, to its west.

The lake and surrounding public lands are a part of the Calamus State Recreation Area, managed by the Nebraska Game and Parks Commission.
