= Loup City, Nebraska =

City in Sherman County, Nebraska, United States

- City
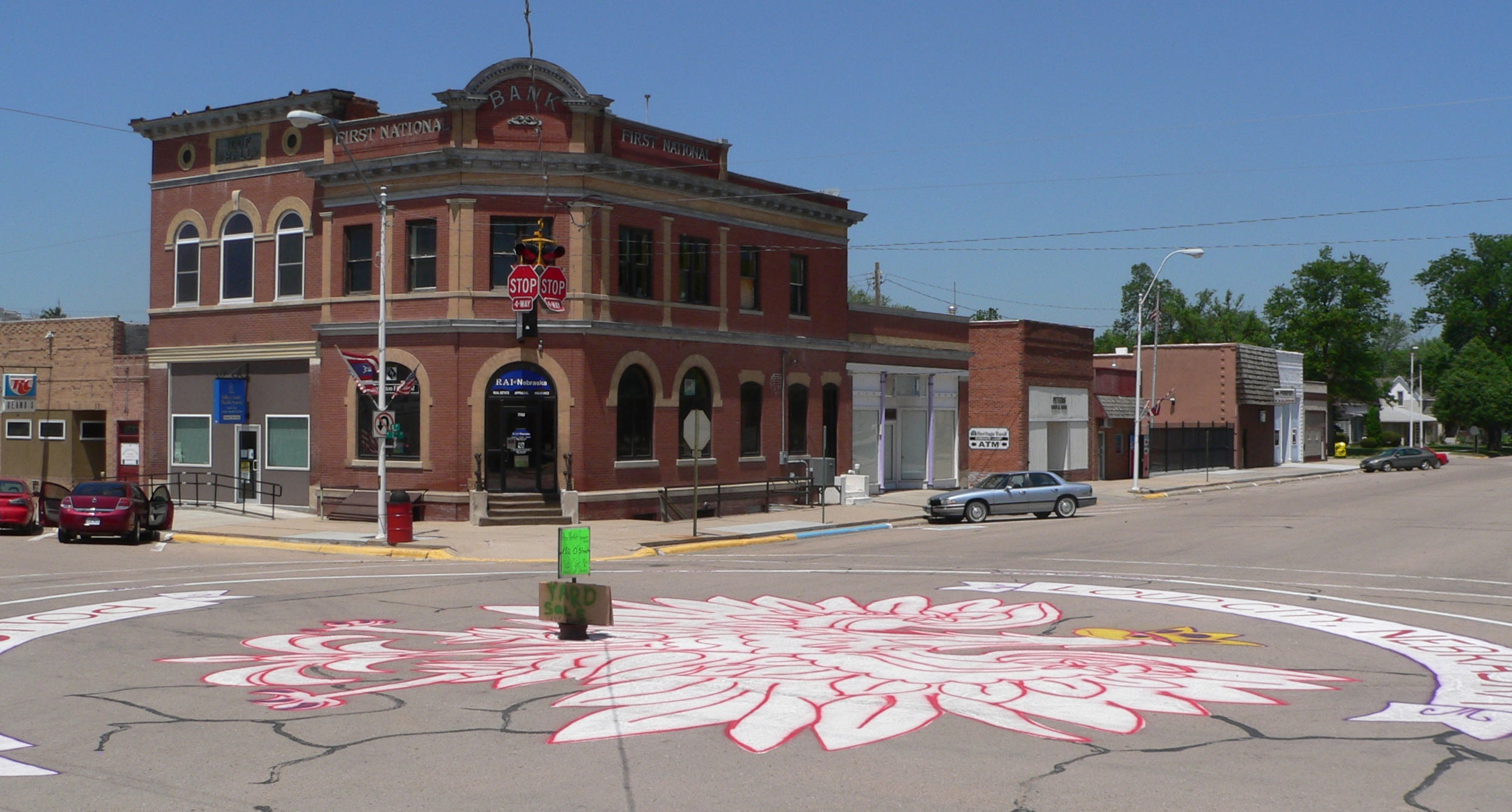
- Corner of 7th and O Streets in Loup City, May 2010. The painting on the pavement is the White Eagle from the Polish coat of arms.
- Nickname: Polish Capital of Nebraska
- Location of Loup City, Nebraska

- Location within the United States
- Coordinates: 41°16′36″N 98°58′04″W
- Country: United States
- State: Nebraska
- County: Sherman

Area
  - Total: 0.94 sq mi (2.44 km^{2})
  - Land: 0.94 sq mi (2.44 km^{2})
  - Water: 0 sq mi (0.00 km^{2})
- Elevation: 2,070 ft (630 m)

Population (2020)
  - Total: 1,053
  - Density: 1,118.0/sq mi (431.66/km^{2})
- Time zone: UTC-6 (Central (CST))
  - Summer (DST): UTC-5 (CDT)
- ZIP code: 68853
- Area code: 308
- FIPS code: 31-29470
- GNIS feature ID: 2395773
- Website: www.loupcity.com

Loup City is a city and the first permanent settlement in, and the county seat of, Sherman County, Nebraska, United States. As of the 2020 census, Loup City had a population of 1,053. Loup City is close to the Middle Loup River, and about 5 miles (8.0 km) from Sherman Reservoir.

== History ==
The first settlement at Loup City was made in the mid 1860s. Loup City was platted in 1864, and designated county seat. Loup City was named after the Loup River.

During the Great Depression, Loup City was the site of a clash between leftist activists, influenced by Mother Bloor, who clashed with area residents in June 1934 following efforts by Communists to organize the workers of a poultry processing plant.

The completion of Sherman Reservoir in 1963 added tourism to the area's economic base.

== Demographics ==
Historical population
Census	Pop.	Note	%±
1890	871		—
1900	926		6.3%
1910	1,128		21.8%
1920	1,364		20.9%
1930	1,446		6.0%
1940	1,675		15.8%
1950	1,508		−10.0%
1960	1,415		−6.2%
1970	1,456		2.9%
1980	1,368		−6.0%
1990	1,104		−19.3%
2000	1,116		1.1%
2010	1,173		5.1%
2020	1,053		−10.2%
U.S. Decennial Census

=== 2010 census ===
As of the census of 2010, there were 1,173 people, 702 households, and 263 families residing in the city. The population density was 1,094.7 inhabitants per square mile (422.7/km^{2}). There were 996 housing units at an average density of 605.3 per square mile (233.7/km^{2}). The racial makeup of the city was 98.7% White, 0.1% Native American, 0.4% Asian, 0.2% from other races, and 0.6% from two or more races. Hispanic or Latino of any race were 1.6% of the population.

There were 704 households, of which 88.8% had children under the age of 18 living with them, 57.4% were married couples living together, 0.5% had a female householder with no husband present, 3.0% had a male householder with no wife present, and 3.1% were non-families. 20.5% of all households were made up of individuals; 20.4% consisted of someone who was 65 years of age or older and living alone. The average household size was 2.4 and the average family size was 3.33.

The median age in the city was 39.7 years. 22.2% of residents were under the age of 18; 5.2% were between the ages of 18 and 24; 18.8% were from 25 to 44; 26.3% were from 45 to 64; and 27.5% were 65 years of age or older. The gender makeup of the city was 46.8% male and 53.2% female

== Geography ==
According to the United States Census Bureau, the city has a total area of 0.94 square miles (2.43 km^{2}), all land.

=== Climate ===
Climate data for Loup City, Nebraska (1991–2020 normals, extremes 1901–present)
Month	Jan	Feb	Mar	Apr	May	Jun	Jul	Aug	Sep	Oct	Nov	Dec	Year
Record high °F (°C)	75 (24)	80 (27)	92 (33)	98 (37)	101 (38)	107 (42)	112 (44)	110 (43)	105 (41)	97 (36)	85 (29)	83 (28)	112 (44)
Mean maximum °F (°C)	60.1 (15.6)	64.6 (18.1)	77.4 (25.2)	84.4 (29.1)	89.7 (32.1)	95.0 (35.0)	98.4 (36.9)	96.2 (35.7)	92.3 (33.5)	86.7 (30.4)	74.5 (23.6)	61.3 (16.3)	99.1 (37.3)
Mean daily maximum °F (°C)	37.4 (3.0)	41.3 (5.2)	52.6 (11.4)	62.9 (17.2)	72.9 (22.7)	83.7 (28.7)	88.2 (31.2)	86.1 (30.1)	78.7 (25.9)	65.7 (18.7)	51.7 (10.9)	39.6 (4.2)	63.4 (17.4)
Daily mean °F (°C)	24.9 (−3.9)	28.4 (−2.0)	38.9 (3.8)	49.0 (9.4)	59.6 (15.3)	70.8 (21.6)	75.5 (24.2)	73.3 (22.9)	64.5 (18.1)	51.2 (10.7)	38.0 (3.3)	27.6 (−2.4)	50.1 (10.1)
Mean daily minimum °F (°C)	12.4 (−10.9)	15.5 (−9.2)	25.1 (−3.8)	35.1 (1.7)	46.4 (8.0)	57.9 (14.4)	62.9 (17.2)	60.5 (15.8)	50.4 (10.2)	36.7 (2.6)	24.3 (−4.3)	15.6 (−9.1)	36.9 (2.7)
Mean minimum °F (°C)	−8.5 (−22.5)	−5.1 (−20.6)	6.6 (−14.1)	21.3 (−5.9)	32.2 (0.1)	44.8 (7.1)	52.0 (11.1)	49.4 (9.7)	35.0 (1.7)	19.7 (−6.8)	7.7 (−13.5)	−2.9 (−19.4)	−12.9 (−24.9)
Record low °F (°C)	−33 (−36)	−32 (−36)	−18 (−28)	−4 (−20)	20 (−7)	33 (1)	40 (4)	36 (2)	14 (−10)	4 (−16)	−16 (−27)	−26 (−32)	−33 (−36)
Average precipitation inches (mm)	0.56 (14)	0.66 (17)	1.53 (39)	2.94 (75)	4.36 (111)	4.14 (105)	3.23 (82)	3.19 (81)	2.18 (55)	1.88 (48)	1.13 (29)	0.67 (17)	26.47 (672)
Average snowfall inches (cm)	7.7 (20)	6.5 (17)	4.5 (11)	1.2 (3.0)	0.0 (0.0)	0.0 (0.0)	0.0 (0.0)	0.0 (0.0)	0.0 (0.0)	1.3 (3.3)	3.3 (8.4)	6.2 (16)	30.7 (78)
Average precipitation days (≥ 0.01 in)	3.9	4.6	6.6	9.0	11.0	10.7	8.9	8.2	5.9	6.5	4.4	3.8	83.5
Average snowy days (≥ 0.1 in)	3.7	3.5	1.9	0.8	0.0	0.0	0.0	0.0	0.0	0.6	1.4	2.6	14.5
Source: NOAA

== Culture ==
For many years Loup City has proclaimed itself as the "Polish capital of Nebraska," due to a significant Polish population (see Polonia). "Polish Days" is an annual community event held on the first weekend of June. The town's Catholic church, Saint Josaphat's, features stained glass windows commemorating area families, most with Polish names. The windows were salvaged from the previous St. Josaphat's and date from the early 1900s.

The early Loup City settlement has been depicted in the 2014 movie The Homesman.

== Recreation ==
Sherman Dam – 2,845-acre (1,151 ha) lake and 4,721 land acres (1,911 ha). Primitive camping includes 360 non-pad sites. Facilities include picnic tables, shelters, water, dumpstation, modern restrooms, vault toilets, four boat ramps, fish cleaning stations, coin-operated showers and concession.

Bowman Recreation Area – Bowman Lake, located one mile west of Loup City, is a 23-acre (9.3 ha) area lying adjacent to the Loup River and features a 20-acre (8.1 ha) man-made lake. It offers picnicking, fishing and primitive camping.

Jenners Park – At one time, Jenner's Park was home to amusement rides and a zoo. Today, the park is home to a disc golf course, two picnic shelters, outdoor grills, playground equipment, and an outdoor recreation area.

Loup City Swimming Pool – Newly built in 2000, the Loup City pool has a water slide, diving board, basketball hoop, mushroom, and zero depth entry.

Loup City Golf Course – A 9-hole course located one mile west of Loup City. The par 36 course has mature trees, a creek, and several ponds.

Petersen Park Ball Fields – Two newly developed baseball fields used for T-ball teams to high school softball teams. The park also includes a playground area for younger children.

== Notable people ==
- Edmund C. Jaeger – Desert ecologist and naturalist who taught at Riverside City College in Riverside, California for 30 years
- Charles H. Mohr – News correspondent during the Vietnam War and in the Middle East
- Richard Raymond – Prominent Nebraska doctor and Undersecretary in the Department of Agriculture during the George W. Bush Administration

== See also ==
- List of municipalities in Nebraska
