= Fort Hartsuff State Historical Park =

Park in Nebraska, USA

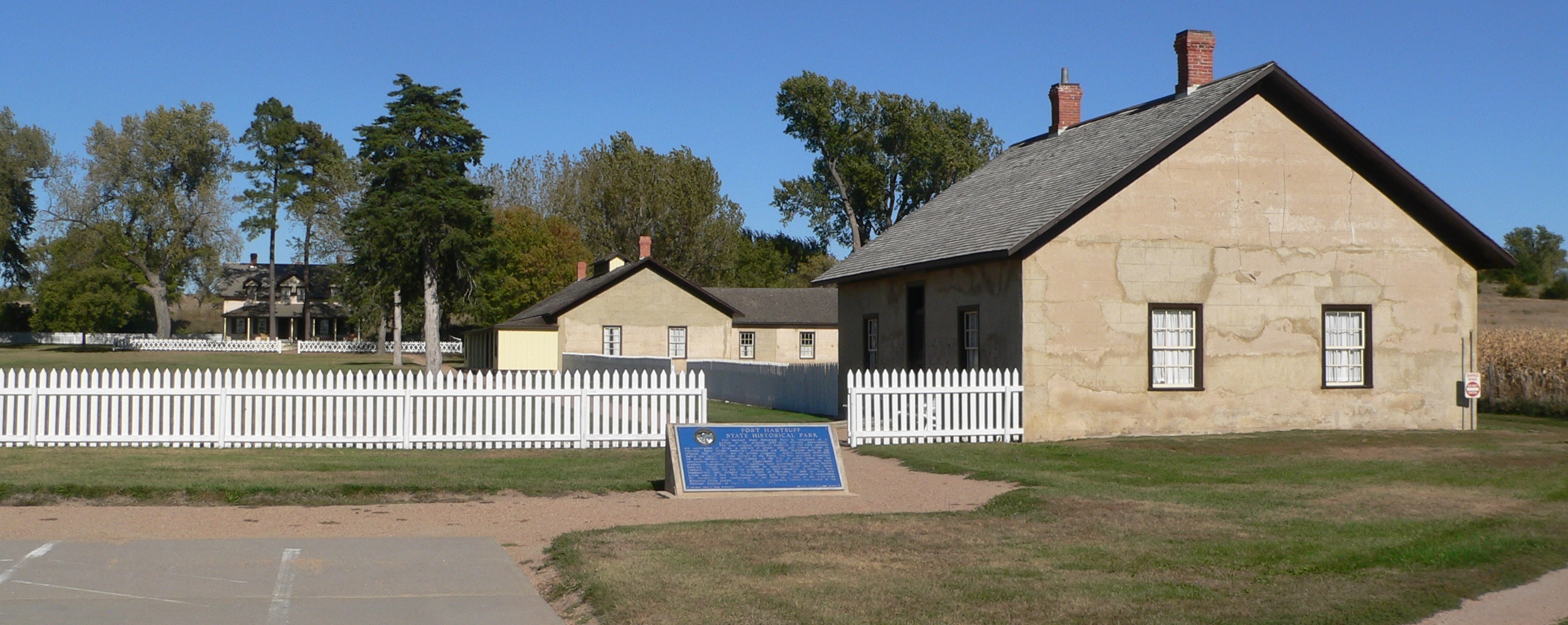

- Location within Nebraska Location within the United States
- Location: Valley County, Nebraska, United States
- Nearest city: Burwell, Nebraska
- Coordinates: 41°43′22″N 99°1′23″W
- Area: 18.4 acres (7.4 ha)
- Elevation: 2,126 ft (648 m)
- Designation: Nebraska state historical park
- Established: 1961
- Administrator: Nebraska Game and Parks Commission
- Website: Fort Hartsuff State Historical Park

Fort Hartsuff State Historical Park is a state park located six miles (9.7 km) southeast of Burwell, Nebraska, preserving a typical U.S. Army cavalry outpost of the late 19th century. Fort Hartsuff was active from 1874 to 1881. Among its surviving original structures are the post headquarters, enlisted men’s barracks, officers’ quarters, commanding officers quarters, and post hospital; other buildings have been reconstructed.

== History ==
Fort Hartsuff was named in honor of George Lucas Hartsuff, a graduate of West Point who was wounded in action in 1855 during the Florida Seminole Indian War, and who also later rose to the rank of major-general of volunteers during the American Civil War.
