= Keith Boughn =

American politician (1925–1977)

Member of the Nebraska Legislature from the 21st district
- In office January 5, 1977 – December 7, 1977
- Preceded by: Thomas C. Kennedy
- Succeeded by: Thomas C. Kennedy

Personal details
- Born: October 20, 1925 Randolph, Nebraska
- Died: December 7, 1977 (aged 52) Norfolk, Nebraska
- Party: Republican
- Spouse: Maxine M. Nelson (m. 1950)
- Children: 3 (Colleen, Butch, Kelly)
- Education: Wayne State College
- Occupation: Teacher

Keith Boughn (October 20, 1925 – December 7, 1977) was a Republican politician and teacher from Nebraska who served as a member of the Nebraska Legislature from the 21st district in 1977.

== Early life ==
Boughn was born in Randolph, Nebraska, in 1925, and graduated from Wayne State College. He completed graduate work at Wayne State, Brigham Young University, and the University of Albuquerque, and taught American history at Norfolk High School.

== Nebraska Legislature ==
In 1976, when State Senator Thomas C. Kennedy announced that he would not seek another term, Boughn ran to succeed him in the 21st district, which was based in Madison and Pierce counties. Boughn faced agribusinessman J. Paul McIntosh and farmer Arlan Renner in the nonpartisan primary, and placed first, winning 47 percent of the vote to McIntosh's 29 percent and Renner's 24 percent. In the general election, Boughn defeated McIntosh with 54 percent of the vote, one of only two Republican gains in the legislature that year.

== Death ==
Boughn died on December 3, 1977.
