= Bluestem State Recreation Area =

Recreation area in Nebraska, United States

- Location within Nebraska Location within the United States
- Location: Lancaster, Nebraska, United States
- Coordinates: 40.630546°N 96.787947°W
- Area: 742 acres (300 ha)
- Governing body: Nebraska Game and Parks Commission

Bluestem State Recreation Area (SRA) is a state park in southeastern Nebraska, United States. The recreation area is located on the 325-acre Bluestem Reservoir, approximately 2.5 miles (4.0 km) west of Sprague, or about 18 miles (29 km) south of the State Capitol, Lincoln. The recreation area is managed by the Nebraska Game and Parks Commission. The area is popular for boating, fishing, camping, and swimming. The reservoir is stocked with largemouth bass, bluegill, channel catfish, walleye and crappies. There are 19 primitive campsites.

== See also ==
- Salt Valley Lakes
