= Eugene T. Mahoney =

American politician

Member of the Nebraska Legislature from the 5th district
- In office June 27, 1961 – July 16, 1976
- Preceded by: John P. Munnelly
- Succeeded by: Bernice Labedz

Nebraska Game and Parks Commission Director
- In office 1976–1988

Personal details
- Born: March 27, 1928 Chicago, Illinois
- Died: July 15, 2004 (aged 76) Omaha, Nebraska
- Party: Democratic (1969–2004); Republican (1956–1969); Democratic (until 1956)
- Education: University of Nebraska Omaha

Eugene Thomas Mahoney (March 27, 1928 – July 15, 2004), known as "Gene," was a member of the Nebraska Legislature and long-time director of the Nebraska Game and Parks Commission.

Eugene Mahoney was born on March 27, 1928, in Chicago, Illinois. One of six children born to a Catholic family, he moved to Omaha, Nebraska, as a young boy. He was an active participant of the Boy Scouts and was an Eagle Scout. He served as an administrative assistant to Congressman Glenn Cunningham, and he worked as the Director of Public Relations at the Commercial Savings Association in Omaha, Nebraska. He was active in his community and served on the board of directors of St. Vincent De Paul Stores, St. John's Seminary Association, Q Street Merchants, the National Conference of Christians and Jews, and Citizens for Decent Literature.

In 1949, Mahoney joined the Omaha Police Department, and he achieved the rank of sergeant before resigning from the department in 1961 to become a state senator. Mahoney was appointed to the Nebraska Legislature in a controversial move on June 27, 1961. While Nebraska Governor Frank B. Morrison, a Democrat, was attending a conference in Hawaii, Lieutenant Governor Dwight Burney, a Republican, appointed Mahoney, at that time a Republican, to a seat in the legislature to fill a vacancy created by the resignation of Senator John P. Munnelly. (At that time, the offices of Nebraska Governor and Nebraska Lieutenant Governor were elected separately, which enabled those offices to be held by individuals of different political parties.) After being appointed to the Nebraska Legislature, Mahoney was reelected in 1962, 1964, 1968, and 1972. In 1969, he changed his political affiliation from Republican to Democrat. He also became chairman of the executive board of the Nebraska Legislature during his tenure in the Legislature.

On July 16, 1976, Mahoney was appointed as the director of the Nebraska Game and Parks Commission and resigned from the Nebraska Legislature. During his directorship, he is credited with reversing the fortunes of the then-moribund Nebraska state park system. According to his obituary, he used his connections at the capitol "to persuade lawmakers to enact a park-entry permit and devote a portion of cigarette tax revenue to building park roads. Under his leadership, parks added such services as rental cabins, the fees of which helped support the system." While he was director from 1976 to 1988, annual park visits at Nebraska state parks grew by about two million. Mahoney was quoted as saying, "After the job of governor, it is the second-most toughest job in the state."

After resigning as the Director of the Nebraska Game and Parks Commission, Mahoney served as director of the Omaha Zoo Foundation. He died on July 15, 2004, in Omaha.

Eugene T. Mahoney State Park, located on the Platte River, off Interstate 80, approximately four miles (6.4 km) east of Ashland, Nebraska, is named in honor of him.
