= Buffalo Bill Ranch =

Historic house in Nebraska, United States

- Scout's Rest Ranch
- U.S. National Register of Historic Places
- U.S. National Historic Landmark
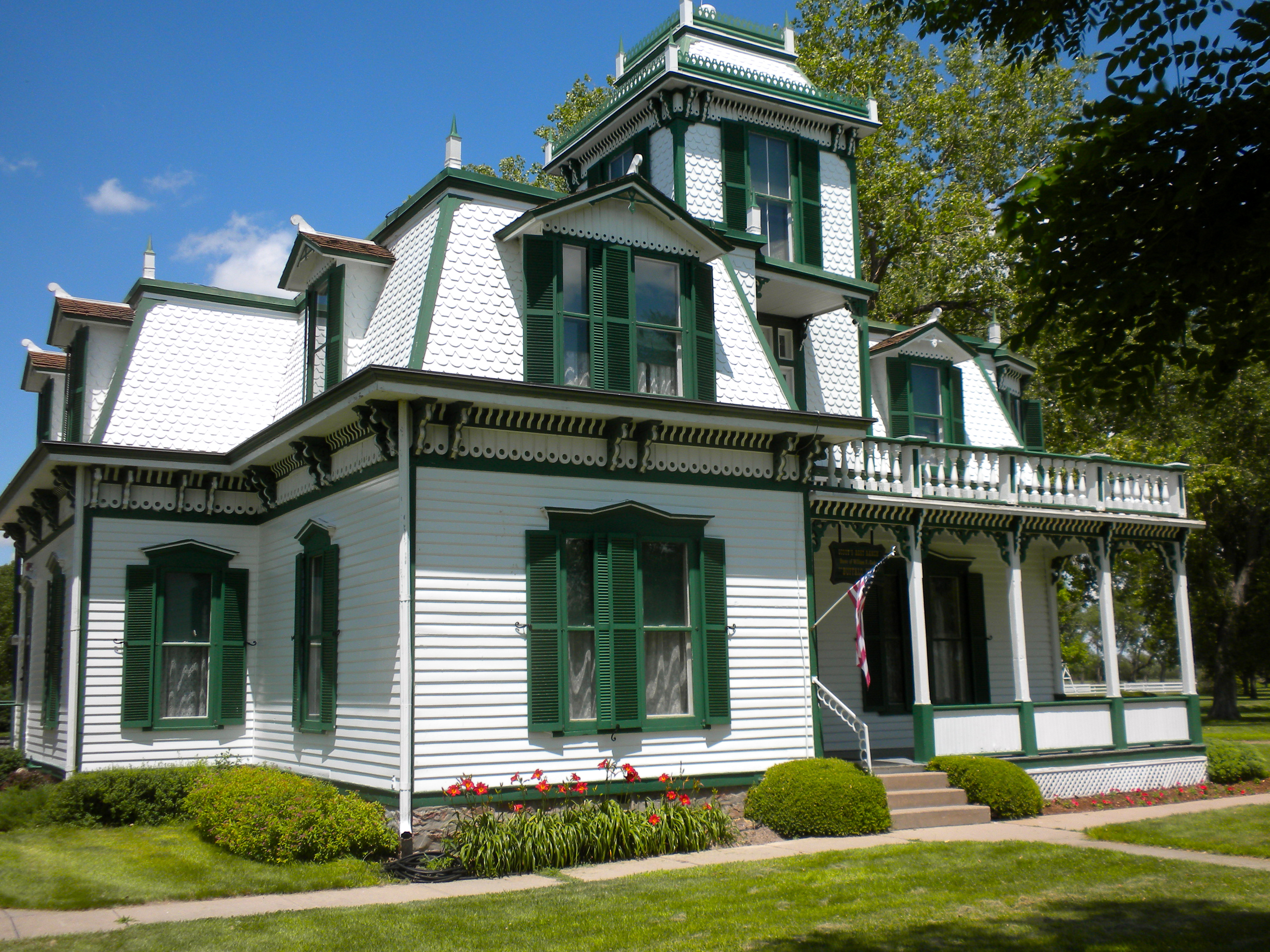

- Location within Nebraska Location within the United States
- Nearest city: North Platte, Nebraska
- Coordinates: 41°9′48″N 100°47′42″W
- Area: 25 acres (10 ha)
- Built: 1886
- Architect: Walsh, Patrick
- Architectural style: Second Empire
- NRHP reference No.: 78001705, 100006250

Significant dates
- Added to NRHP: January 30, 1978
- Designated NHL: January 13, 2021

Buffalo Bill Ranch State Historical Park, known as Scout's Rest Ranch, is a living history state park located west of North Platte, Nebraska. The ranch was established in 1878 with an initial purchase of 160 acres south of the Union Pacific tracks by William (Buffalo Bill) Cody. The 4,000 acre ranch was sold in 1911 and has been under the management of the Nebraska Game and Parks Commission since 1964. The 25 acre historic state park, added to the National Register of Historic Places in 1978 and designated a National Historic Landmark in 2021, is open weekdays from April to October. The house and outbuildings can be toured, including a museum documenting Cody's life from a Pony Express rider to his Wild West shows.

== Founding of the Cody-North Ranch ==
In 1877 Cody contacted Major Frank North, the leader of the Pawnee Scouts, who was living in Sidney, Nebraska. Cody founded the Cody-North Partnership with the North brothers to form a cattle business. North found land along the Dismal River, 65 miles north of North Platte, on which cattle could graze and a ranch could be built. Cody continued touring his “Buffalo Bill’s Wild West” show while North purchased cattle at the north end of the Texas cattle trail, near Ogallala, Nebraska. North hired cowboys to help operate the ranch while Cody was on tour.

The ranch grew in size to encompass seven thousand acres. 2,500 acres were planted for alfalfa and 2,500 were corn. The Omaha Bee reported on Cody's ranching operations several times. The Bee described the ranch as one of the most improved farms in Nebraska. In cooperation with Isaac Dillon, a neighboring rancher, Cody and Dillon built a 12-mile irrigation ditch, capable of watering 6,000 acres of crops. This property was financially viable for Cody. By the 1880s, however, other homesteaders had begun to move into this area of Nebraska and had taken grazing land. In 1882 the Cody-North Ranching Operation ended and was bought out by John Bratt.

== Founding of Cody Ranch ("Scout's Rest Ranch") ==
During the time of owning the Cody-North Ranch, in 1878, Cody began buying land surrounding North Platte. The first purchase of land was 160 acres for $750, south of the Union Pacific tracks that run through North Platte. Cody purchased nearly 4,000 more acres adjacent to North Platte. An eighteen-room mansion on the property which was a treeless prairie. Cody had land in Kansas that had many tall, established trees and wanted trees on his new ranch. Al Goodman, his brother-in-law, discovered why trees would not grow on his new property or the North Platte area. Goodman found issues of water absorption and planted many cottonwoods and box-elder around the property, able to withstand the conditions. The ranch now had many growing trees. This information was shared with the people of North Platte to increase tree population in the area.

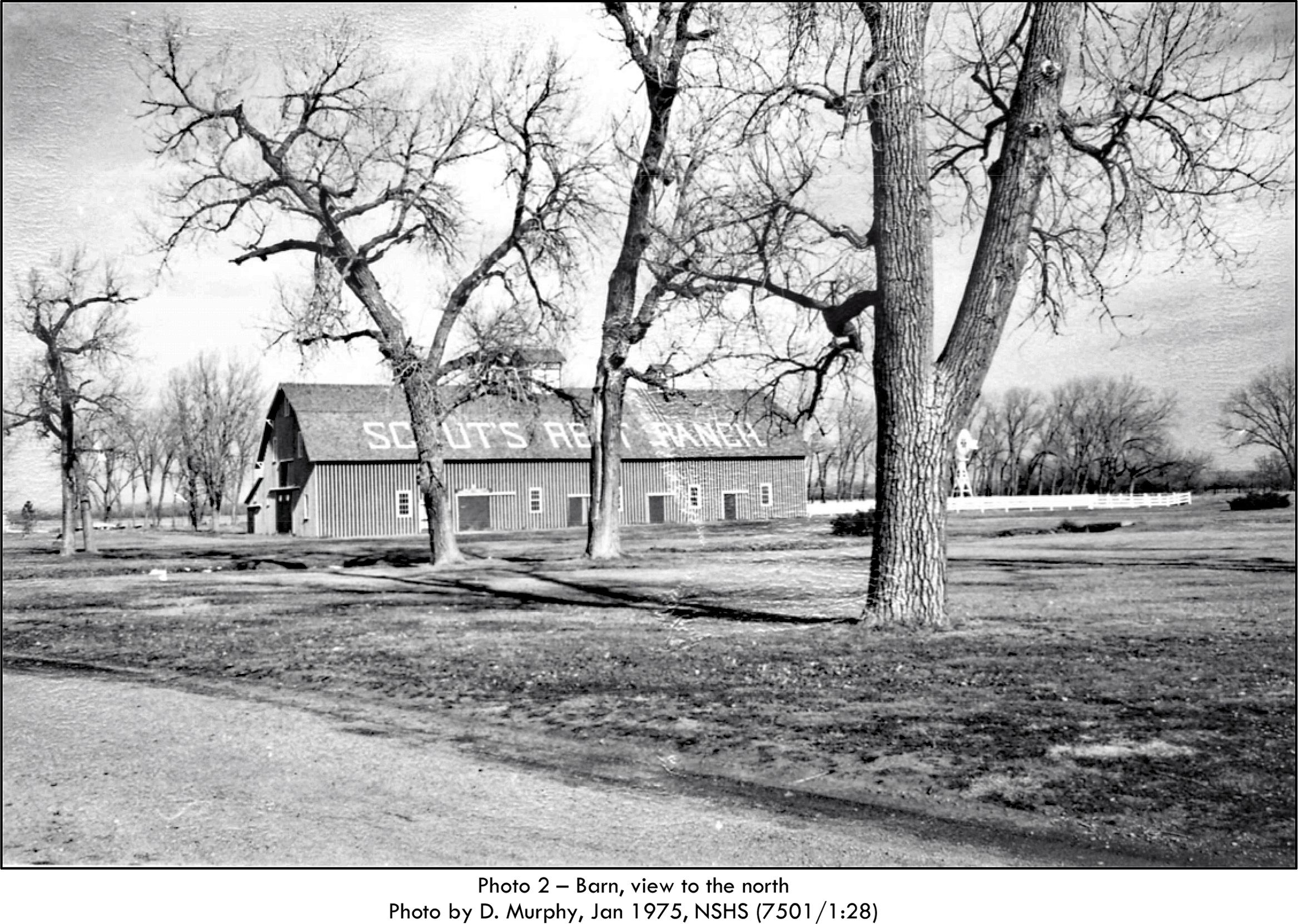
Barn, view to the north

Louisa (Cody's wife) and their daughters moved to North Platte in February 1878. They monitored the property, where Cody wanted to retire. Cody showed his new land and brought out family, friends, and celebrities. These guests, along with his family, spent time with the cowboys employed on the ranch. The ranch grew with the help of the Goodmans, who maintained the ranch and managed the high-grade livestock and thoroughbred horses. By 1885, 1,200 acres were planted as corn, 100 acres of alfalfa, 50 of broomcorn, and a small oat field. The ranch was operated with 80 horses and 30 men, rising to 60 men in busy seasons. When the trees grew, the southern portion of the ranch turned into a wooded park with deer, several young buffaloes, and a large lake. This area of land would be called “Scout’s Rest Ranch”. Cody had the words “Scout’s Rest Ranch” painted on the roof of the large barn, so that it could be read from the Union Pacific tracks a mile away.

This ranch was revolutionary for the time. Cody imported many blooded cattle and thoroughbred horses at a time when that was not common. The land was transformed from treeless prairie to a forested area. Despite advancements and profitable years, operating costs were high and Cody sold the ranch in 1911 for $100,000.

== Modern History ==
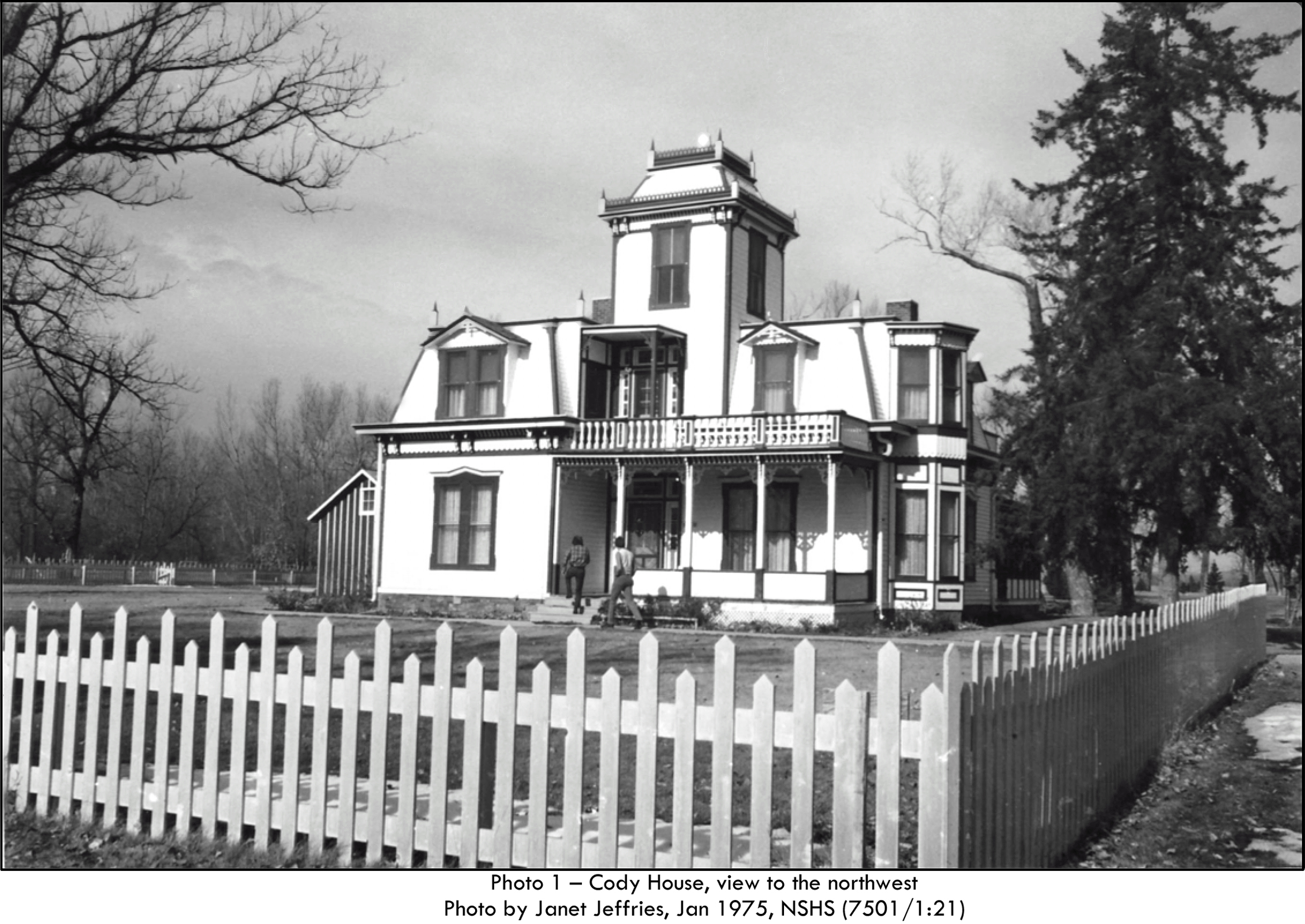
Cody House, view to the northwest

The original two-story house was built in 1886 for Al and Julia Goodman. Al and Julia Goodman are Cody's sister and brother-in-law who managed the ranch. This house was built by Patrick Walsh, a native of North Platte, for $3,900. In 1964 the house was purchased by the Nebraska Game and Parks Commission as part of the process for making Scout's Rest Ranch a State Historical Park, Buffalo Bill Ranch State Historical Park. A Lincoln County Historical Society was organized to help raise money for the purchase of Buffalo Bill Cody's house. The group raised $37,500 and the Nebraska Game and Parks Commission to cover the other $75,000 required for the purchase. Another $90,000 was planned to be spent on restoring the grounds and buildings. Since 1964, the State Historical Park has been open to the public.

=== Park Information ===
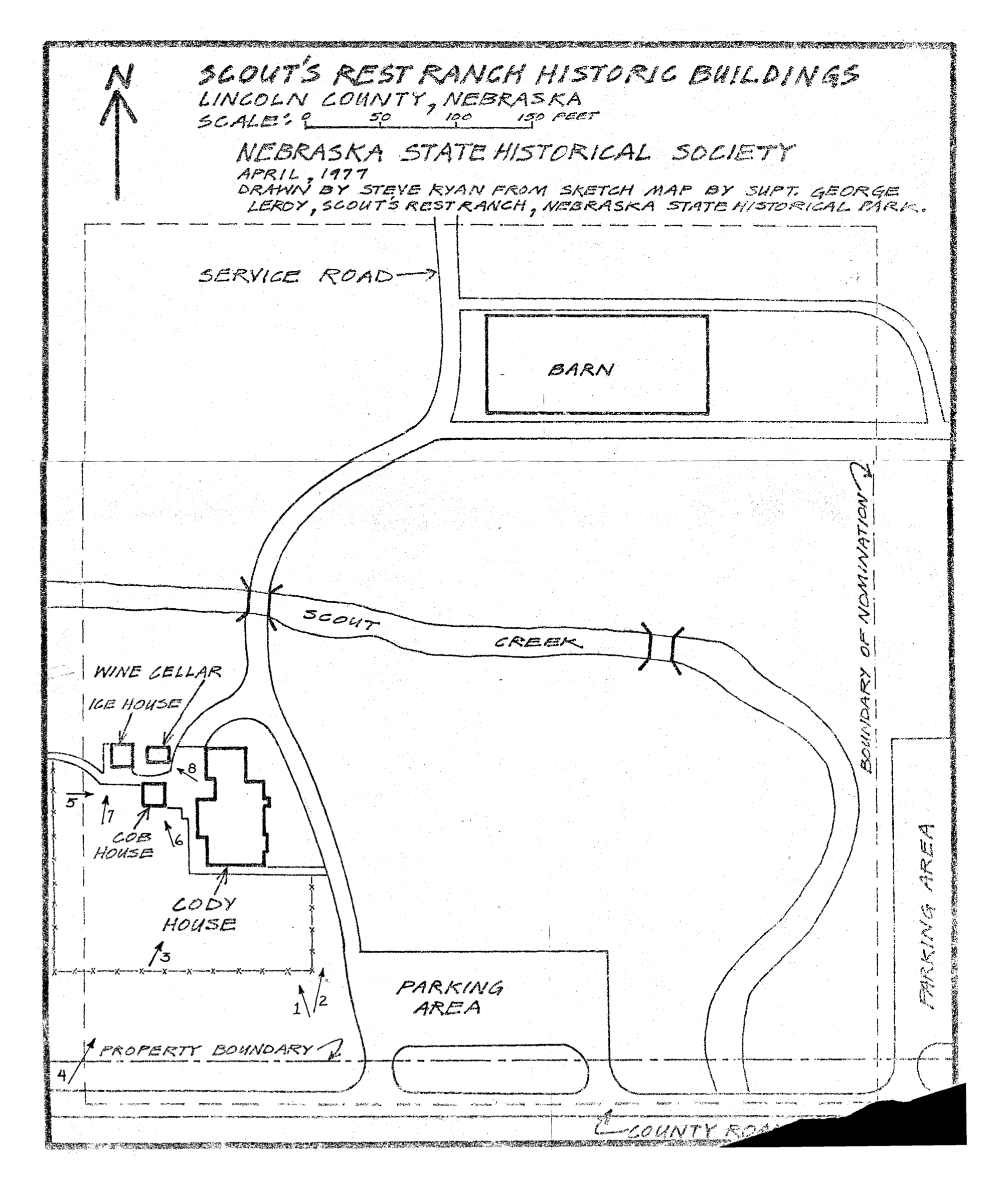
Map of Scout's Rest Ranch Historic Buildings

The Buffalo Bill Ranch State Historical Park is 25 acres and contains 4 original structures. The structures on the park include the Second Empire style mansion built in 1886 for the Goodmans, listed on the National Register of Historic Places in 1978. Other buildings are the cob house, used for storing corncobs that were kindling for the house stoves, the ice house that was built in 1886 along with the main house, and the original barn, built in 1887, used for storing the thoroughbred livestock and has “Scout's Rest Ranch” painted on the roof.

=== Flood of 2011 ===
During flooding on the Platte River in the summer of 2011, the site was closed, exhibits moved and berms were built around the buildings. The flooding came close to the compound but was not as severe as expected.
