= Willow Creek State Recreation Area =

Willow Creek State Recreation Area may refer to

- Willow Creek State recreation Area (Alaska)
- Willow Creek State Recreation Area (Nebraska)
