= Box Butte Reservoir State Recreation Area =

Recreation area in Nebraska, United States

- Location within Nebraska Location within the United States
- Location: Dawes, Nebraska, United States
- Coordinates: 42.459494°N 103.075460°W
- Area: 2,212 acres (8.95 km^{2})
- Governing body: Nebraska Game and Parks Commission

Box Butte Reservoir State Recreation Area (SRA) is a state park in northwestern Nebraska, United States. The recreation area is located on the 1,600 acre Box Butte Reservoir, a reservoir on the Niobrara River, approximately 9.5 miles (15.3 km) north of Hemingford and about 31 miles (50 km) southeast of Crawford. The recreation area is managed by the Nebraska Game and Parks Commission. There are camping, fishing, swimming, and other recreational opportunities available.

Nearby points of interest include Chadron State Park, Fort Robinson State Park, and the Nebraska National Forest.

== See also ==
- Nebraska Game and Parks Commission
- Nebraska Sandhills
- Pine Ridge Region
