= Memphis State Recreation Area =

Recreation area in Nebraska, United States

Medicine Creek State Recreation Area
- Location within Nebraska Location within the United States
- Location: Saunders, Nebraska, United States
- Coordinates: 41.102155°N 96.437734°W
- Area: 163 acres (66 ha)
- Governing body: Nebraska Game and Parks Commission

Memphis State Recreation Area (SRA) is a 163-acre state recreation area in east-central Nebraska, United States. The recreation area surrounds the 48-acre Memphis Lake where there is fishing for largemouth bass, bluegill, and channel catfish. Camping, hiking, and boating are popular on and around the lake. The recreation area is managed by the Nebraska Game and Parks Commission.

The recreation area is approximately 20 miles west of Omaha.
