= Richard Peterson (Nebraska politician) =

American politician (1928–2020)

Member of the Nebraska Legislature from the 21st district
- In office January 7, 1981 – January 6, 1993
- Preceded by: Thomas C. Kennedy
- Succeeded by: Carol Hudkins

Personal details
- Born: December 3, 1928 Meadow Grove, Nebraska
- Died: March 30, 2020 (aged 91) Madison, Nebraska
- Party: Republican
- Spouse: Kathryn Kuhl (m. 1950)
- Children: 5 (Michael, Sandra, Karen, Julie, Richard)
- Occupation: Farmer, businessman, beekeeper

Richard Peterson (December 3, 1928 – March 30, 2020) was a Republican politician from Nebraska who served as a member of the Nebraska Legislature from the 21st district from 1981 to 1993.

== Early life ==
Peterson was born in Meadow Grove, Nebraska in 1928, and graduated from Madison High School in 1946. He was a farmer and beekeeper in Norfolk.

== Nebraska Legislature ==
In 1980, State Senator Thomas C. Kennedy declined to seek re-election. Peterson ran to succeed him in the 21st district, which was based in Madison and Pierce counties. In the nonpartisan primary, he faced businessman Paul McIntosh and former Madison County Judge R. Bruce Penning. McIntosh narrowly placed first in the primary, receiving 37 percent of the vote to Peterson's 36 percent and Henning's 27 percent, and McIntosh and Peterson advanced to the general election. Peterson ultimately defeated McIntosh, winning 54 percent of the vote to McIntosh's 46 percent.

Peterson ran for re-election to a second term in 1984. He was challenged by J. R. Peterson, a state highway department engineer, and Steven Liewer, a carpenter. Senator Peterson placed first in the primary by a wide margin, receiving 74 percent of the vote to J. R. Peterson's 17 percent and Liewer's 9 percent. They advanced to the general election, where Peterson won re-election, 75–25 percent.

In 1988, Peterson ran for re-election to a third term. He was challenged by J. R. Peterson, in a rematch of their 1984 campaign, and stockbroker T. Patrick Stinson. In the primary election, Senator Peterson placed first, receiving 56 percent of the vote to Stinson's 33 percent, with Peterson and Stinson advancing to the general election. In the general election, Peterson declined to debate Stinson, stating that he "ha[s] never felt debates proved anything," but Stinson attacked him for his refusal, arguing, "He knows that opening dialogue is going to cause him some grief." Peterson ultimately defeated Stinson, winning re-election 59–41 percent.

Following redistricting in 1992, the 21st district was originally abolished, and Peterson declined to seek re-election. On July 2, 1992, the Nebraska Supreme Court struck down the state's new redistricting plan, resulting in the recreation of a Madison County-based district, numbered the 19th district. Peterson did not revisit his decision to not seek re-election, and was succeeded by Connie Day in the 19th district.

== Death ==
Peterson died on March 30, 2020.
