= Dead Timber State Recreation Area =

Recreation area in Nebraska, United States

- Location within Nebraska
- Location: Dodge County, Nebraska, United States
- Coordinates: 41°43′00″N 96°41′31″W
- Area: 200 acres (81 ha)
- Elevation: 1,266 ft (386 m)
- Established
- Named for: dead timbers left after a wildfire
- Governing body: Nebraska Game and Parks
- Website: Dead Timber State Recreation Area

Dead Timber State Recreation Area is a Nebraska state park in Dodge County, Nebraska in the United States. The park is 200 acres (81 ha) and sits at an elevation of 1,266 feet (386 m). The park is open for year-round recreation including fishing, camping, and non-powered boating. Dead Timber State Recreation Area is north of Scribner on U.S. Route 275.

Dead Timber State Recreation Area was the site of a seasonal Indian encampment. Local legend holds that the area acquired its name after an Indian campfire got out of control and burned much of the standing timber in the area, hence the name Dead Timber. The park is located between the Elkhorn River and an oxbow lake that was once part of the nearby meandering river.

The natives camped near the river in the summer months before retreating behind the river bluffs and settling on the oxbow. An oxbow lake is formed when a river creates a meander due to the river eroding the banks through hydraulic action and abrasion/corrasion. After a long period of time this meander becomes very curved, and eventually the neck of the meander will touch the opposite side and the river will cut through the neck, cutting off the meander to form the oxbow lake.

The park lies within Dodge County which was settled by European Americans in 1856. The whites displaced the Pawnee among other Native American tribes. The winter of 1856 was an especially hard winter. The newly arrived whites felt threatened by their Indian neighbors who camped near their settlements. The Pawnee sent a party to the town of Fremont to threaten war. The conflict was resolved when the whites agreed to provide food for the natives. The Pawnee were removed to a reservation by 1859.

Dead Timber State Recreation Area is a small and largely undeveloped state park. Recreation is limited to camping, fishing, boating and picnicking. All boats must be human-powered as all motorized boats are not permitted in the park. Primitive restroom facilities are located within the park. There are 17 camping pads with electricity and 25 pads without electricity. Fishing is permitted in the oxbow lake.

Budget cuts brought on by the nationwide recession has caused the state of Nebraska to dramatically limit the services it provides at Dead Timbers State Recreation Area and many other Nebraska state parks. Local citizens have seen the need to help care for the parks themselves and they have been volunteering to carry on chores normally handled by the state such as mowing grass, serving as camp hosts, and pulling other maintenance on the park's facilities.
