= Arnold State Recreation Area =

Former recreation area in Nebraska, United States

- Location within Nebraska Location within the United States
- Location: Custer County, Nebraska, United States
- Nearest city: Arnold
- Coordinates: 41.244950°N 100.115106°W
- Area: 32 acres (13 ha)
- Governing body: Nebraska Game and Parks Commission

Arnold State Recreation Area (SRA) was a state park in central Nebraska, United States. The recreation area was located along the South Loup River, approximately .5 miles (0.80 km) south of Arnold, or about 41 miles (66 km) northeast of North Platte. The recreation area was managed by the Nebraska Game and Parks Commission until 2010, when it was conveyed to the Village of Arnold. It will remain under their ownership unless the village ceases to operate the lands, in which case the park shall be conveyed back to the Nebraska Game and Parks Commission.

The park is now known as the Arnold Lake Campground and Recreation Area. Opportunities for fishing, hiking, picnicking, and camping are available.
