= Box Butte Dam =

- Location within Nebraska Location within the United States
- Country: United States
- Location: Dawes County, Nebraska
- Coordinates: 42°27′18″N 103°04′38″W
- Status: Operational
- Opening date: 1946
- Built by: United States Bureau of Reclamation

Dam and spillways
- Height: 87 ft (27 m)
- Length: 5,508 ft (1,679 m)

Reservoir
- Creates: Box Butte Reservoir
- Total capacity: 31,060 acre⋅ft (38,310,000 m^{3})
- Surface area: 1,600 acres (650 ha)
- Normal elevation: 4,000 ft (1,220 m)

Box Butte Dam (National ID # NE01069) is a dam in the arid northwestern panhandle area of Dawes County, Nebraska.

The earthen dam was constructed from 1941 through 1946 by the United States Bureau of Reclamation with a structural height of 87 feet (27 m) and 5,508 feet (1,679 m) long at its crest. It impounds the Niobrara River for flood control, part of the Bureau's Mirage Flats Project for irrigation water storage. No hydroelectric power is produced here.

The reservoir it creates, Box Butte Reservoir, has a water surface of 1,600 acres (650 ha), 612 acres (248 ha) of surrounding land, about 14 miles (23 km) of shoreline, and a capacity of 31,060 acre-feet (38,310,000 m^{3}). Recreation includes fishing (for northern pike, walleye, largemouth bass, yellow perch, and channel cat), hunting, boating, camping and hiking.

The southern shore of the lake borders the Box Butte Reservoir State Recreation Area.
