= Carol Hudkins =

American politician (born 1945)

Member of the Nebraska Legislature from the 21st district
- In office January 6, 1993 – January 7, 2009
- Preceded by: Richard Peterson
- Succeeded by: Ken Haar

Personal details
- Born: February 21, 1945 (age 81) North Platte, Nebraska
- Party: Republican
- Spouse: Larry Hudkins (m. 1964)
- Children: 2
- Education: University of Nebraska–Lincoln
- Occupation: Farmer, medical transcriptionist

Carol Hudkins (born February 21, 1945) is a Republican politician from Nebraska who served as a member of the Nebraska Legislature from the 21st district from 1993 to 2009.

== Early life and career ==
Hudkins was born in North Platte, Nebraska. She graduated from high school in Waverly, then attended the University of Nebraska. She married Larry Hudkins in 1964; the couple farmed near Malcolm, and Hudkins worked as a medical transcriptionist. She was elected to the Malcolm school board, and served as its chair.

== Legislative elections ==
In 1992, Hudkins ran for the Nebraska Legislature from District 21, which then consisted of parts of Lancaster, Saunders, and Sarpy Counties. In the nonpartisan primary election, she placed first of five candidates, with 31.7% of the vote to Bill Sapp's 28.3%. As the top two vote-getters, she and Sapp moved on to the general election, which Hudkins won with 57% of the vote to Sapp's 43%.

In 1996, Hudkins defended her seat from a challenge by Carol Yoakum and Dale McClure, both of Lincoln. In the primary, Hudkins took 59.3% of the vote; Yoakum, 27.3%; and McClure, 13.4%. In the general election, Hudkins received 64.3% of the vote to Yoakum's 35.4%.

Hudkins ran unopposed for re-election to her seat in the legislature in 2000, and again in 2004.

In 2000, Nebraska voters passed a term-limits amendment to the state's constitution, under which state legislators could serve no more than two terms consecutively. This rendered Hudkins ineligible to run for re-election in 2008, in which year she announced her retirement.

== Legislative career ==
During her tenure in the Legislature, Hudkins served on the Rules Committee, of which she was chairperson; the Natural Resources Committee, of which she was vice-chairperson; the Judiciary Committee, of which she was vice-chairperson; the Agriculture Committee; the General Affairs Committee; the Transportation and Telecommunications Committee; and the Executive Board.

In the Legislature, Hudkins proposed a bill to license and regulate acupuncturists so that they could practice in Nebraska; the measure passed in 2001.

Hudkins also sponsored legislation to lower the legal blood-alcohol level for drivers from 0.10% to 0.08%. Recently passed federal legislation that withheld highway funds from states that failed to adopt the lower limit played a role in the passage of the measure.
