= Thomas C. Kennedy =

American politician (1914–2006)

Member of the Nebraska Legislature from the 21st district
- In office December 19, 1977 – January 7, 1981
- Preceded by: Keith Boughn
- Succeeded by: Richard Peterson
- In office January 8, 1969 – January 5, 1977
- Preceded by: S. H. Brauer
- Succeeded by: Keith Boughn

Personal details
- Born: October 12, 1914 Genoa, Nebraska
- Died: January 20, 2006 (aged 91) Albion, Nebraska
- Spouse: LaVern Kamrath (m. 1934)
- Children: 3 (Joan, Bonnie, Kimberlee)
- Occupation: Farmer/businessman

Thomas Cain Kennedy (October 12, 1914 – January 20, 2006) was an American politician from Nebraska who served as a member of the Nebraska Legislature from the 21st district from 1969 to 1977 and again from 1977 to 1981.

== Early career ==
Kennedy was born in Genoa, Nebraska, in 1914, and graduated from Newman Grove High School in 1933. He was a farmer and cattle feeder, and was elected to the Newman Grove School Board.

== Nebraska Legislature ==
In 1968, Kennedy ran for the state legislature from the 21st district, which included Madison and Pierce counties, challenging incumbent State Senator S. H. Brauer for re-election. In the primary election, Brauer placed first by a wide margin, receiving 62 percent of the vote to Kennedy's 38 percent. They advanced to the general election, where Kennedy narrowly defeated Brauer, winning his first term, 51–49 percent.

Kennedy ran for a second term in 1972. Following redistricting, a small portion of Platte County was added to the 21st district. Kennedy's only opponent was Merle Finkral, a Norfolk Regional Center patient supervisor, who launched a write-in campaign against him one week before the primary. Kennedy received 92 percent of the vote in the primary election, and Finkral received 8 percent, and 538 votes, which surpassed the minimum required by state law to be officially nominated. In the general election, Kennedy defeated Finkral in a landslide, receiving 72 percent of the vote to her 28 percent.

In 1976, Kennedy declined to run for re-election, noting that his daughter, Kim, was in high school and would be splitting her time between the family's home in Newman Grove and Lincoln if he served another term. Instead, he and Governor J. James Exon announced the formation of the State Health Manpower Referral Service, which was organized to help doctors set up practices in rural communities, with Kennedy serving as the executive director of the Service.

Kennedy was succeeded in the legislature by Keith Boughn, who died on December 3, 1977, less than a year into his term. Exon appointed Kennedy to serve until a special election could be held in 1978 to fill the remaining two years of Boughn's term. Kennedy was sworn in on December 19, 1977.

Kennedy ran in the special election, and was challenged by Merle Hansen, a farmer and activist associated with the American Agriculture Movement and Nebraskans For Peace. Kennedy placed first in the primary election by a wide margin, winning 69 percent of the vote to Hansen's 31 percent, and they advanced to the general election. He won re-election over Hansen in a landslide, receiving 71 percent to Hansen's 29 percent.

In 1980, Kennedy announced that he would not seek re-election.

== Death ==
Kennedy died on January 20, 2006.
