= Chadron State Park =

Park in Nebraska, United States

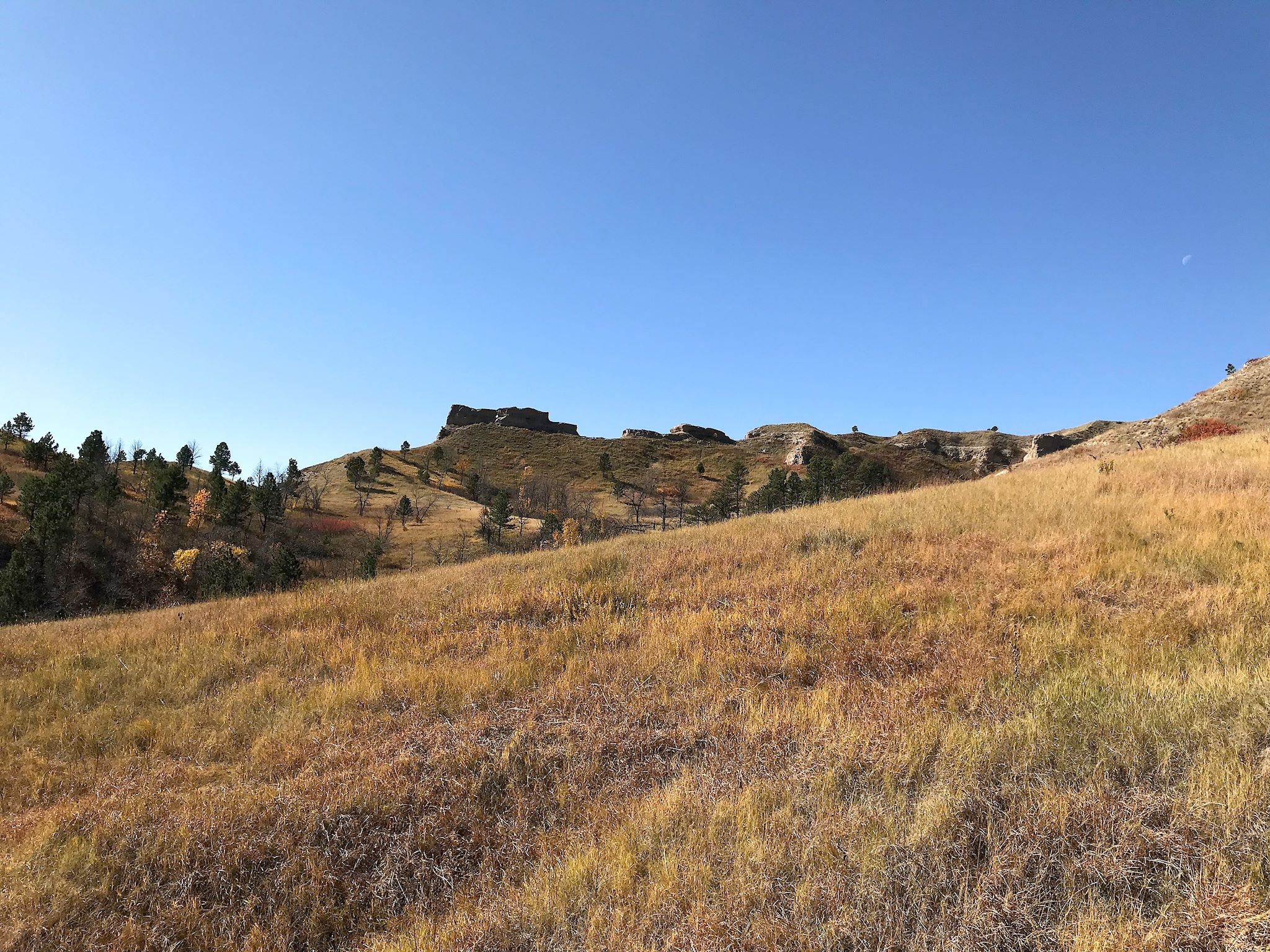

- Location within Nebraska
- Interactive map of Chadron State Park
- Location: Dawes County, Nebraska, United States
- Nearest city: Chadron, Nebraska
- Coordinates: 42°42′32″N 103°1′3″W
- Area: 974.26 acres (394.27 ha)
- Elevation: 3,999 ft (1,219 m)
- Established: 1921
- Administrator: Nebraska Game and Parks Commission
- Designation: Nebraska state park
- Website: Official website

Chadron State Park is a public recreation area located within the Nebraska National Forest, nine miles (14 km) south of Chadron, Nebraska, in the northwestern portion of the state. The park's 974 acres (394 ha) include a portion of the Pine Ridge escarpment and Chadron Creek. The park is wooded with ponderosa pine throughout and cottonwood trees near the creek and lagoon.

== History ==
The act that established Chadron State Park was introduced to the Nebraska Legislature by Senator James W. Good and Representative George C. Snow, both of Dawes County. The park was opened in 1921, making it Nebraska's oldest state park. It originally consisted of 640 acres (260 ha).

The Civilian Conservation Corps was active in the park in the 1930s:

Under the work program guest cabins were constructed and improvements made at the swimming pool and picnic and recreation area. Roads and trails were improved and drainage structures built. Brush dams were built to control soil and stream bank erosion, and the water supply system at the headquarters area was improved.

A promotional booklet, "Nebraska's Own State Park", was distributed to various state leaders in 1947 to advocate for modernized facilities.

In August 2012, with the park threatened by the 58,000+ acre West Ash Wildfire, crews set backfires in the park to deprive the fire of fuel. The controlled burns worked and saved all structures and equipment. The park reopened to visitors in September 2012. Although 90% of the park burned, no infrastructure was lost and its forest survived intact, with most of the fire having stayed on the ground as an understory grass fire.

== Activities and amenities ==
Activities include swimming in a regulation-sized pool, horseback riding, archery, disc golf, hiking, tennis, sand volleyball, and fishing. The park has rental paddleboats, hiking trails, campground, and cabins.
