= Ken Haar =

American politician

Member of the Nebraska Legislature from the 21st district
- In office January 7, 2009 – January 4, 2017
- Preceded by: Carol Hudkins
- Succeeded by: Mike Hilgers

Personal details
- Born: March 10, 1943 (age 83) Freeman, South Dakota
- Party: Democratic
- Education: University of Nebraska–Lincoln (B.S., M.S.Ed.)
- Profession: Educator

Ken Haar (born March 10, 1943) is a politician from the U.S. state of Nebraska. A resident of Malcolm, Haar held a seat in the Nebraska Legislature from 2009 to 2017. He is a member of the Democratic Party.

Haar was born in Freeman, South Dakota. He graduated from Lincoln High School in Lincoln, Nebraska, in 1961, then attended the University of Nebraska–Lincoln, where he obtained a B.S. in education in 1965 and an M.S. in educational administration in 1973. He served on the Lincoln City Council from 1989 to 1997.

== Legislative elections ==
In 2008, Haar ran for the Legislature from the 21st Legislative District, which covers the northwestern corner of Lancaster County, including the northwestern portion of Lincoln; incumbent Carol Hudkins was ineligible to run under Nebraska's term-limits law. In the nonpartisan primary, he placed first of six candidates, receiving 28.3% of the vote; Raymond businessman James Jeffers, a Republican, came in second, with 24.9%. Haar and Jeffers, as the top two vote-getters, moved on to the general election.

In the general election, Haar was targeted for defeat by anti-abortion groups, on the grounds that his wife, Chris Funk, was the head of the Planned Parenthood organization in Nebraska and western Iowa, and that Haar had voted for funding for the organization while on the Lincoln City Council. When the election was held, the margin was narrow enough to require a recount; this determined that Haar had won by a margin of 20 votes, with 7806 votes to Jeffers' 7786.

Haar ran for re-election in 2012. In the nonpartisan primary election, he received 51.0% of the vote; Lincoln attorney Mike Hilgers took 46.2%; and Bryan C. Ifland, 2.8%. Hilgers, a Republican described by the Lincoln Journal Star as "Catholic and pro-life", stated that his chief concern was jobs and the economy, although abortion-related issues were important to him as well. Haar won the general election, with 50.3% of the vote to Hilgers's 49.7%.

== Legislative tenure ==
During his first term in the Legislature, Haar sat on the Education Committee and the Natural Resources Committee. In 2015, he left those committees and was named to the Appropriations Committee.

Haar has been described as a "leading environmentalist" in the Legislature. In 2011, it appeared that the U.S. State Department would soon render a decision to permit or prohibit the proposed Keystone XL pipeline, which would carry crude oil from Canada to Texas and would run across Nebraska. Haar called for a special session of the Legislature to pass legislation that would give the state authority to alter the pipeline's route; this, he said, would enable Nebraska to reject a pipeline route that crossed the Sandhills, where groundwater lies near the surface. Governor Dave Heineman called the session in November 2011; in the course of it, speaker Mike Flood announced that pipeline operator TransCanada had agreed to a change in route to bypass the Sandhills. Haar described the outcome as "a win-win". In December 2012, Haar, together with pipeline opponents Bold Nebraska and the Sierra Club, urged the state's Department of Environmental Quality to delay its report on the pipeline route, arguing that further study was necessary. In 2014, when 34 of the 49 Nebraska legislators signed a letter urging the State Department to approve the pipeline, Haar was one of three legislators who signed a letter calling for its rejection.

In the 2013 legislative session, Haar introduced, and named as his priority bill, LB583, which called for a report on the effects of climate change on the state. An amendment by Beau McCoy added "cyclical" before "climate change"; McCoy, who expressed disbelief in anthropogenic climate change, stated that this would remove politics from the bill. The measure passed by a margin of 32–12 and was signed by governor Heineman. When the Nebraska Department of Agriculture issued its request for information for the study, it interpreted the amended phrasing as excluding human-caused changes, an interpretation to which Haar took strong exception, appearing on The Rachel Maddow Show to say so. Eventually, the study was cancelled, after the University of Nebraska–Lincoln announced that it would do its own study of the matter.
