= S. H. Brauer =

American politician (1899–1976)

Member of the Nebraska Legislature from the 21st district
- In office January 5, 1965 – January 6, 1969
- Preceded by: Thomas Damrow (redistricted)
- Succeeded by: Thomas C. Kennedy

Personal details
- Born: November 9, 1899 Freeman, South Dakota
- Died: May 11, 1976 (aged 76) Norfolk, Nebraska
- Party: Republican
- Spouse: Pauline M. Carter (m. 1926)
- Children: 4 (Siegfried, Richard, Albert, Virginia)
- Education: University of Oklahoma (B.S., M.D.)
- Occupation: Physician, surgeon

S. H. Brauer Sr. (November 9, 1899 – May 11, 1976) was a Republican politician and physicican from Nebraska who served as a member of the Nebraska Legislature from the 21st district from 1965 to 1969.

== Early life ==
Brauer was born in Freeman, South Dakota, in 1899, and attended the University of Oklahoma, receiving his bachelor's degree in 1924 and his medical degree in 1926. He settled in Norfolk, where he practiced medicine for fifty years. Brauer served in the U.S. Army Air Forces during World War II

== Nebraska Legislature ==
In 1964, following redistricting, Brauer ran for the state legislature from the 21st district, which was based in Madison County. In the nonpartisan primary, the elder Brauer faced former Republican Congressman R. D. Harrison. Harrison placed first in the primary, winning 56 percent of the vote to Brauer's 44 percent. They advanced to the general election, where Brauer narrowly defeated Harrison, winning 53–47 percent. Brauer's son, S. H. Brauer Jr., ran for the legislature from the 42nd district in the same election, but the younger Brauer ultimately lost.

Brauer ran for re-election in 1968, and was challenged by Thomas C. Kennedy, a member of the Newman Grove School Board. Following court-ordered redistricting, the 21st expanded to include Pierce County. Brauer placed first over Kennedy in the primary election, winning 62 percent of the vote to Kennedy's 38 percent, but in the general election, Kennedy defeated Brauer by a thin margin, winning 51 percent of the vote to Brauer's 49 percent.

== Death ==
Brauer died on May 11, 1976.
