= Medicine Creek State Recreation Area =

Recreation area in Nebraska, United States

- Location within Nebraska Location within the United States
- Location: Frontier, Nebraska, United States
- Coordinates: 40.377586°N 100.219179°W
- Governing body: Nebraska Game and Parks Commission

Medicine Creek State Recreation Area (SRA) is a state recreation area in southern Nebraska, United States. The recreation area surrounds the 1,768-acre Medicine Creek Reservoir also known as Harry Strunk Lake, a reservoir on Medicine Creek. The recreation area is managed by the Nebraska Game and Parks Commission. There are camping, fishing, swimming, and other recreational opportunities available.
