= Fremont Lakes State Recreation Area =

Recreation area in Nebraska, United States

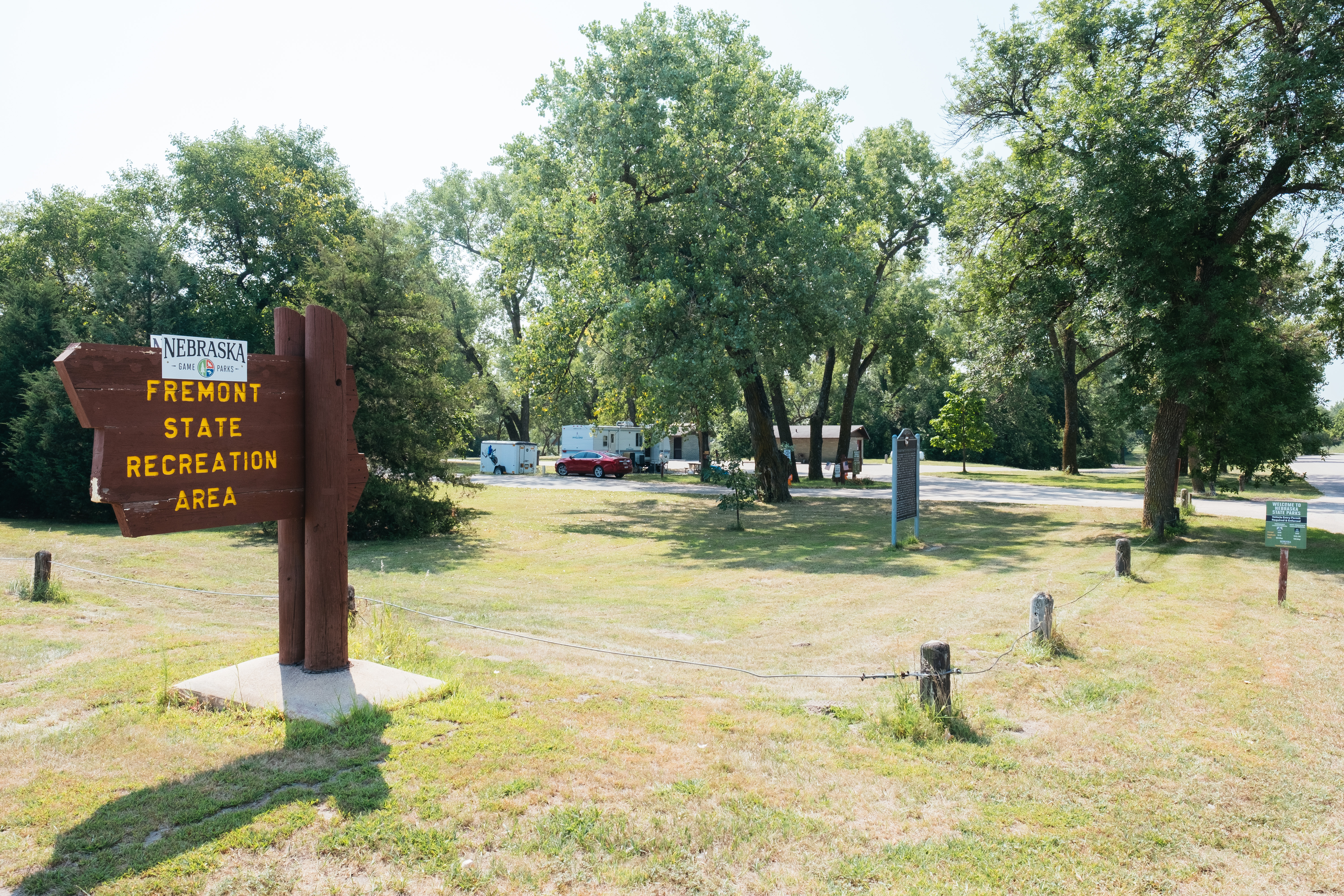

- Location within Nebraska Location within the United States
- Location: Fremont, Nebraska, United States
- Coordinates: 41.450847°N 96.568140°W
- Area: 430 acres (170 ha)
- Governing body: Nebraska Game and Parks Commission

Fremont Lakes State Recreation Area (SRA) is a state park in eastern Nebraska, United States. The recreation area is located along the Platte River, approximately 3 miles (4.8 km) west of Fremont, or about 40 miles (64 km) northwest of Omaha. The recreation area is managed by the Nebraska Game and Parks Commission.

The area is popular in eastern Nebraska for fishing, camping, and swimming. The area includes 20 lakes. Powerboating is allowed on lakes 10, 15 and 20. All other lakes are open to non-power craft and electric trolling motors only. The most common fish found within the area are Largemouth bass, bluegill, crappie and channel catfish. There are 202 RV campsites with electrical hookups and 240 primitive campsites.

== See also ==
- Nebraska Game and Parks Commission
