= John P. Munnelly =

American politician (1918–1989)

Member of the Nebraska Legislature from the 8th district
- In office January 1, 1957 – June 26, 1961
- Preceded by: Jack Larkin Jr.
- Succeeded by: Eugene T. Mahoney

Personal details
- Born: February 1, 1918 Omaha, Nebraska
- Died: August 12, 1989 (aged 71) Omaha, Nebraska
- Party: Democratic
- Spouses: Marie Mahoney (m. 1935; died 1983); Margaret J. Ferrell (m. 1987)
- Children: 4
- Occupation: Fireman, retail liquor dealer, general contractor

John P. "Red" Munnelly (February 1, 1918 – August 12, 1989) was a Democratic politician from Nebraska who served as a member of the Nebraska Legislature from the 8th district from 1957 to 1961, and as the Postmaster for Omaha, Nebraska, from 1961 to 1983.

== Early life ==
Munnelly was born in Omaha, Nebraska, in 1918. He attended Omaha South High School and St. Joseph High School, and worked as an oil station operator from 1937 to 1941, a firefighter for the Union Pacific Railroad from 1941 to 1946, as a retail liquor dealer and contractor, and as a civilian member of the Armed Forces Disciplinary Board at Offutt Air Force Base.

== Nebraska Legislature ==
In 1954, Munnelly challenged State Senator Jack Larkin Jr. for re-election in the Omaha-based 8th district. Larkin placed first in the primary with 44 percent of the vote, and Munnelly placed second with 29 percent. They advanced to the general election, where Larkin defeated Munnelly with 59 percent of the vote.

Larkin declined to seek re-election in 1956, and Munnelly ran to succeed him. Munnelly ran in a crowded primary against Roy Pratt, a retired telephone executive; U.S. Navy veteran John Quinn; liquor store owner Joseph Skudlarek; cafe owner George Stanich; and Jack Swagger, a sales manager. Munnelly placed first, winning 36 percent of the vote, and advanced to the general election with Skudlarek, who narrowly placed second with 17 percent. Munnelly defeated Skudlarek in a landslide, winning 66–34 percent.

Munnelly ran for re-election in 1958, and was re-elected unopposed.

In 1960, Munnelly sought a third term and was challenged by businessman William Blessie and real estate investor Robert Zeigler. He placed first in the primary election by a wide margin, winning 53 percent of the vote to Blessie's 32 percent and Ziegler's 14 percent. In the general election, Munnelly defeated Blessie, 59–41 percent.

== Post-legislative career ==
Munnelly resigned on June 26, 1961, upon his appointment as postmaster for Omaha.

In 1974, Munnelly was elected to the board of directors of the Omaha Public Power District. He was re-elected to a six-year term in 1976.

In January 1982, Munnelly was accused of charging over one thousand personal phone calls to an OPPD credit card, failing to pay the electric bill for a bar that he co-owned, and failing to account for over $7,000 in travel advances. Following the allegations, Munnelly resigned as President of the OPPD and paid back what he was alleged to have owed, and, following an investigation by the Nebraska Accountability and Disclosure Commission, pleaded no contest to three counts of using a public office for financial gain and was fined $3,000. He declined to seek re-election to the OPPD.

The United States Postal Service subsequently opened an investigation into Munnelly, and on August 10, 1982, Munnelly was dismissed by Thomas K. Ranft, the regional director for mail processing of the Postal Service. Munnelly challenged his dismissal in court, and Judge Richard Earl Robinson of the U.S. District Court for the District of Nebraska issued a temporary restraining order blocking Munnelly's dismissal. Munnelly appealed his dismissal, but the Postal Service ultimately upheld it. He challenged his final dismissal in court, and the decision was affirmed by the district court and the U.S. Court of Appeals for the Eighth Circuit.

== Death and legacy ==
Munnelly died on August 12, 1989. Following Munnelly's death, the Omaha City Council voted to name a park in South Omaha after him.
