= Enders Reservoir State Recreation Area =

Recreation area in Nebraska, United States

- Location within Nebraska Location within the United States
- Location: Chase, Nebraska, United States
- Coordinates: 40.426235°N 101.536544°W
- Area: 5,700 acres (23 km^{2})
- Governing body: Nebraska Game and Parks Commission

Enders Reservoir State Recreation Area (SRA) is a state recreation area in southwestern Nebraska, United States. The recreation area surrounds the Enders Reservoir, a reservoir on Frenchman's Creek, approximately 1 mile (1.6 km) south of Enders, or about 7.5 miles (12.1 km) southeast of Imperial. The recreation area is managed by the Nebraska Game and Parks Commission. There are camping, fishing, swimming, and other recreational opportunities available.
