= Charles Mohr (journalist) =

American writer (1929–1989)

Charles Henry Mohr (June 16, 1929 – June 17, 1989) was an American reporter for Time magazine and The New York Times, best known for his multi-year coverage of the Vietnam War.

== Career ==
Mohr was born on June 16, 1929, in Loup City, Nebraska, United States. He graduated from the University of Nebraska in 1951 and was a member of Phi Beta Kappa. He was a reporter for the Lincoln Star in 1950 and 1951. After three years with United Press in Chicago, he joined Time magazine in 1954. His assignments for Time magazine included coverage of San Francisco, the White House, New Delhi, Hong Kong and Saigon.

During the Vietnam War, Mohr's reports appraised the policies underlying the war: attempts at secret bombing, strategic and planning failures, the use of napalm on civilians, efforts to pacify the Vietnamese people, and corruption in South Vietnam's leadership. When Time magazine began to censor his reports from Vietnam, Mohr resigned from the magazine.

Mohr had a long history of heart problems complicated by diabetes. He suffered a fatal heart attack at his home in Chevy Chase, Maryland and died in Suburban Hospital one day after his 60th birthday.
