= Calamus State Recreation Area =

Recreation area in Nebraska, United States

- Location within Nebraska Location within the United States
- Location: Loup and Garfield, Nebraska, United States
- Coordinates: 41.834581°N 99.215244°W
- Area: 10,081 acres (40.80 km^{2})
- Governing body: Nebraska Game and Parks Commission

Calamus State Recreation Area is a state park in central Nebraska, United States. The recreation area includes and surrounds the Calamus Reservoir. The recreation area is managed by the Nebraska Game and Parks Commission.

== See also ==
- Nebraska Game and Parks Commission
