= Pawnee State Recreation Area =

Recreation area in Nebraska, United States

- Location within Nebraska Location within the United States
- Location: Lancaster, Nebraska, United States
- Coordinates: 40.848600°N 96.867215°W
- Area: 2,544 acres (10.30 km^{2})
- Governing body: Nebraska Game and Parks Commission

Pawnee State Recreation Area (SRA) is a state recreation area in southeastern Nebraska, United States. The recreation area surrounds the 740 acres (3.0 km^{2}) Pawnee Lake, located approximately 4 miles (6.4 km) west of Lincoln. The recreation area is managed by the Nebraska Game and Parks Commission. Pawnee Lake is the second largest of the Salt Valley Lakes.

In more recent years, swimming has been prohibited at times because of toxic algae.
