= Branched Oak State Recreation Area =

Recreation area in Nebraska, United States

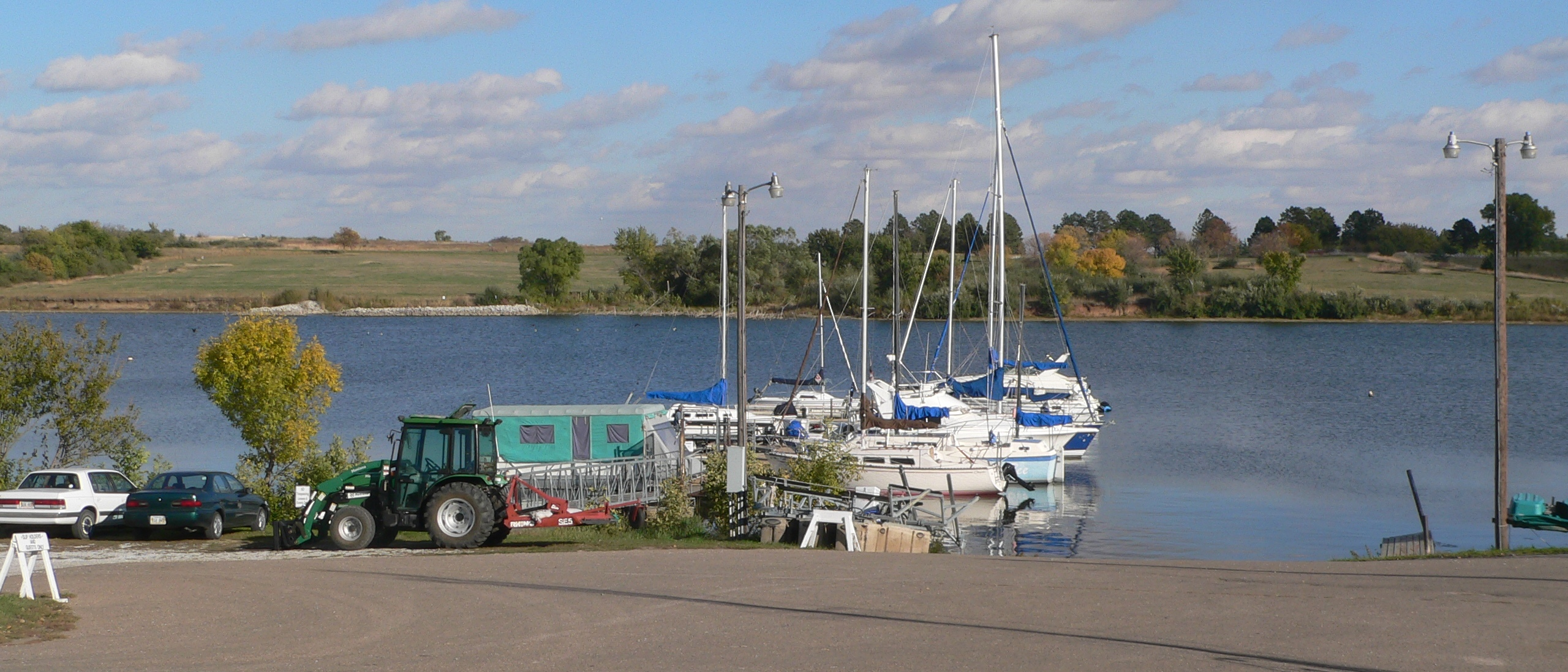
- Branched Oak Lake marina

- Location within Nebraska Location within the United States
- Location: Lancaster, Nebraska, United States
- Coordinates: 40.9713°N 96.8631°W
- Area: 5,595 acres (22.64 km^{2})
- Governing body: Nebraska Game and Parks Commission

Branched Oak State Recreation Area (SRA) is a Nebraska state recreation area located 2.5 miles north of Malcolm, Nebraska (northwest of Lincoln) in Lancaster County. The lake is the largest of the Salt Valley Lakes with 1,800 acres (7 km^{2}) of water in a 5,595-acre (23 km^{2}) park.

== History ==
Branched Oak Lake was formerly the site of the village of Crounse, Nebraska. Crounse was named in honor of Lorenzo Crounse, a former governor, State Supreme Court Justice, and congressman of Nebraska. Branched Oak Lake was created as part of the Salt Valley Lakes flood control project to prevent Salt Creek from flooding the nearby city of Lincoln. The Crounse school closed in 1962, and most residents moved away by 1966. The area was flooded in 1967 and the project was finished eighteen months later in 1968.

Today a historical marker can be found at Area 6 of the recreation area marking the location of the former village. The marker was donated by several Crounse residents and placed in conjunction with the Nebraska State Historical Society. The text of the historical marker reads:

Crounse was once a small village named for Lorenzo Crounse, Nebraska Supreme Court justice (1867-73), congressman (1873-77) and governor (1893-95). The village had a school (1870-1962), post office (1873-1901), church, general store and creamery. Crounse School was the hub of the community. Classes met in homes until the schoolhouse was built on this site in 1873. Activities included picnics, bazaars, 4-H, and ball games. After the school closed in 1962, memories were all that remained of the community.

== Description ==
Branched Oak State Recreation Area features two beaches for swimming, both modern and primitive campsites, and trails for hikers or equestrians. The park also offers hunting, a shooting range, and an archery range. The marina—located in the northeast part of the lake—offers boat rentals, fuel, concessions, bait, and a restaurant, The Boat House Bar and Grill.

The lake is stocked with blue, channel, and flathead catfish; crappie; walleye; bluegill; wipers and largemouth bass.

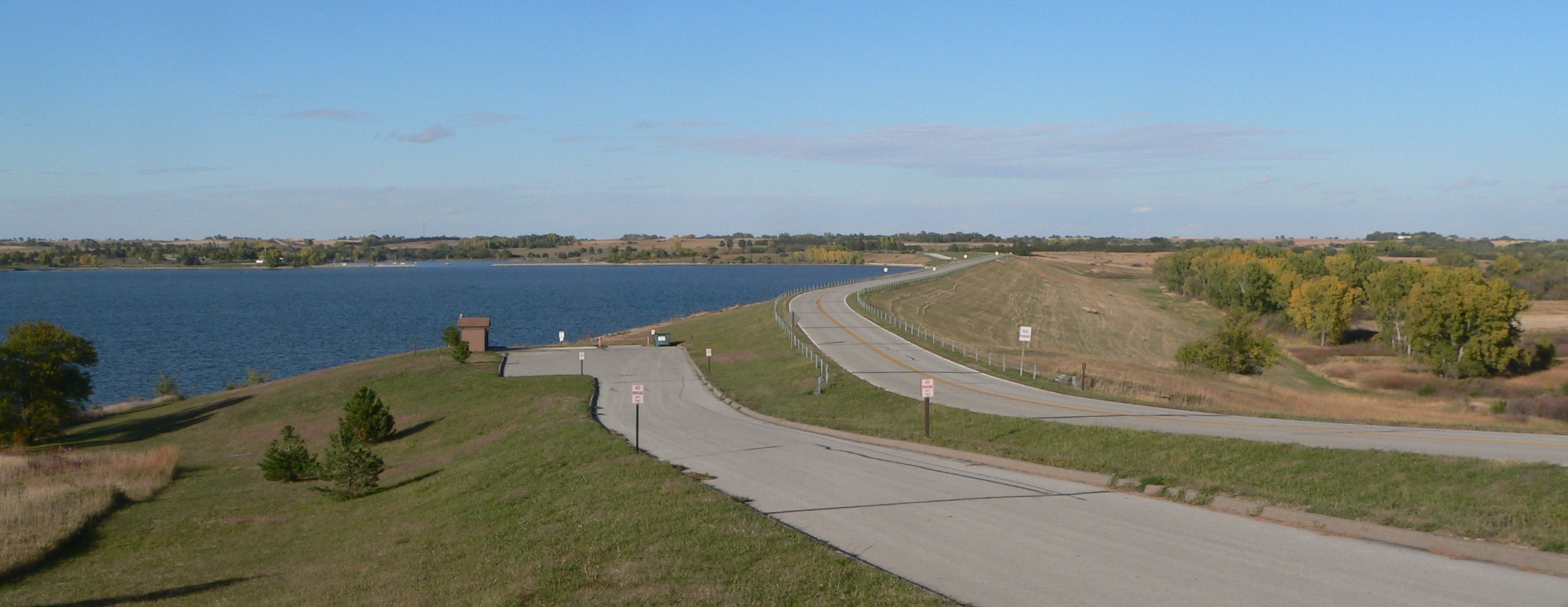
Branched Oak Lake dam, seen from the south

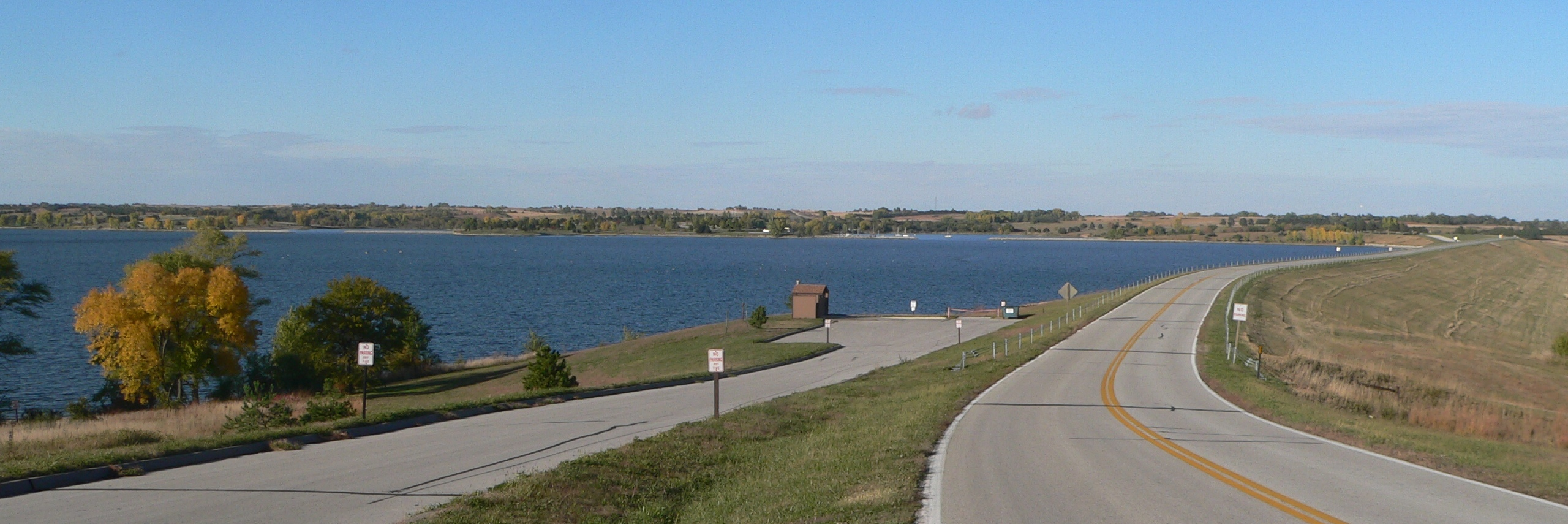
Branched Oak Lake as seen from the dam

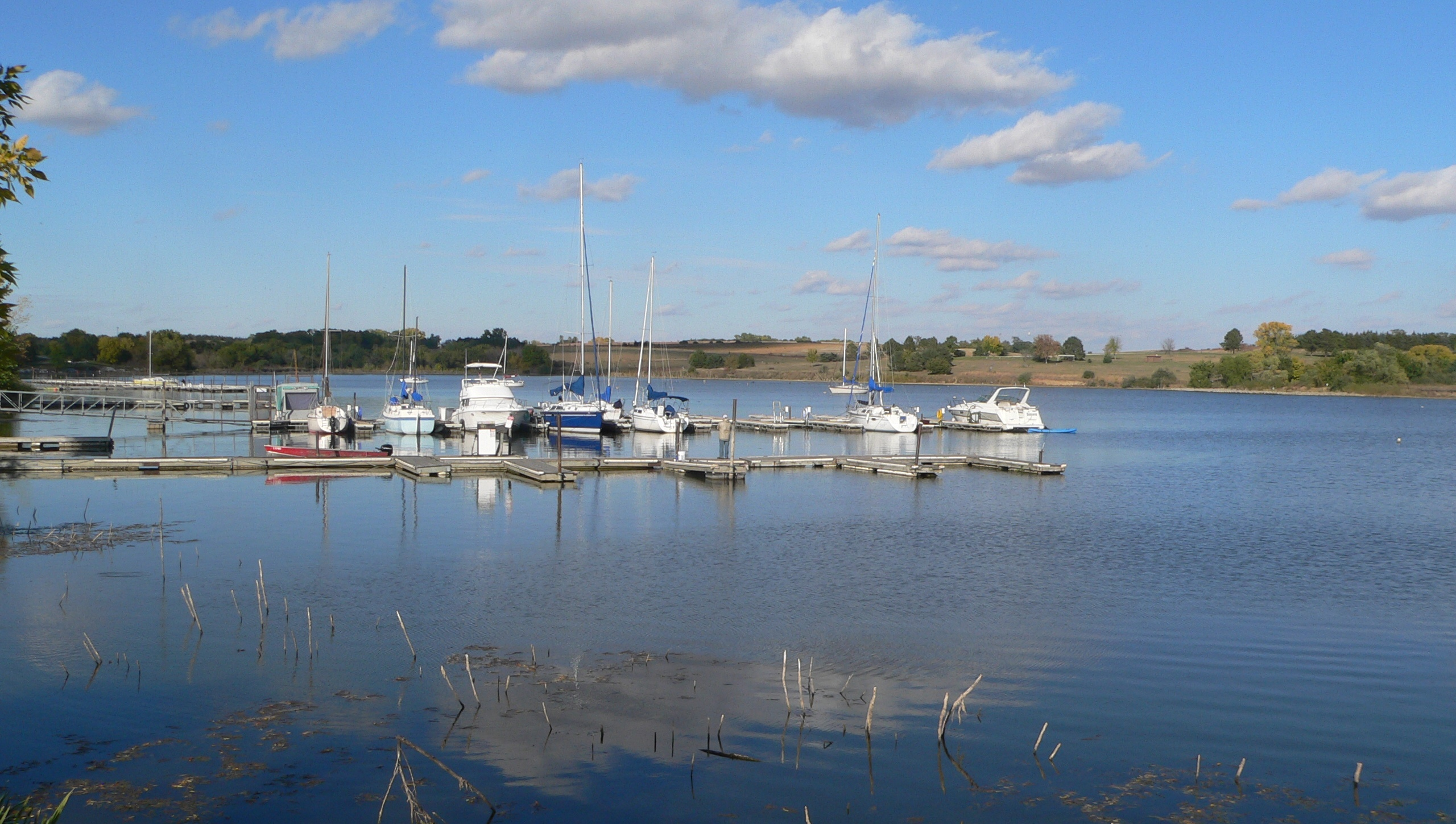
Branched Oak Lake marina

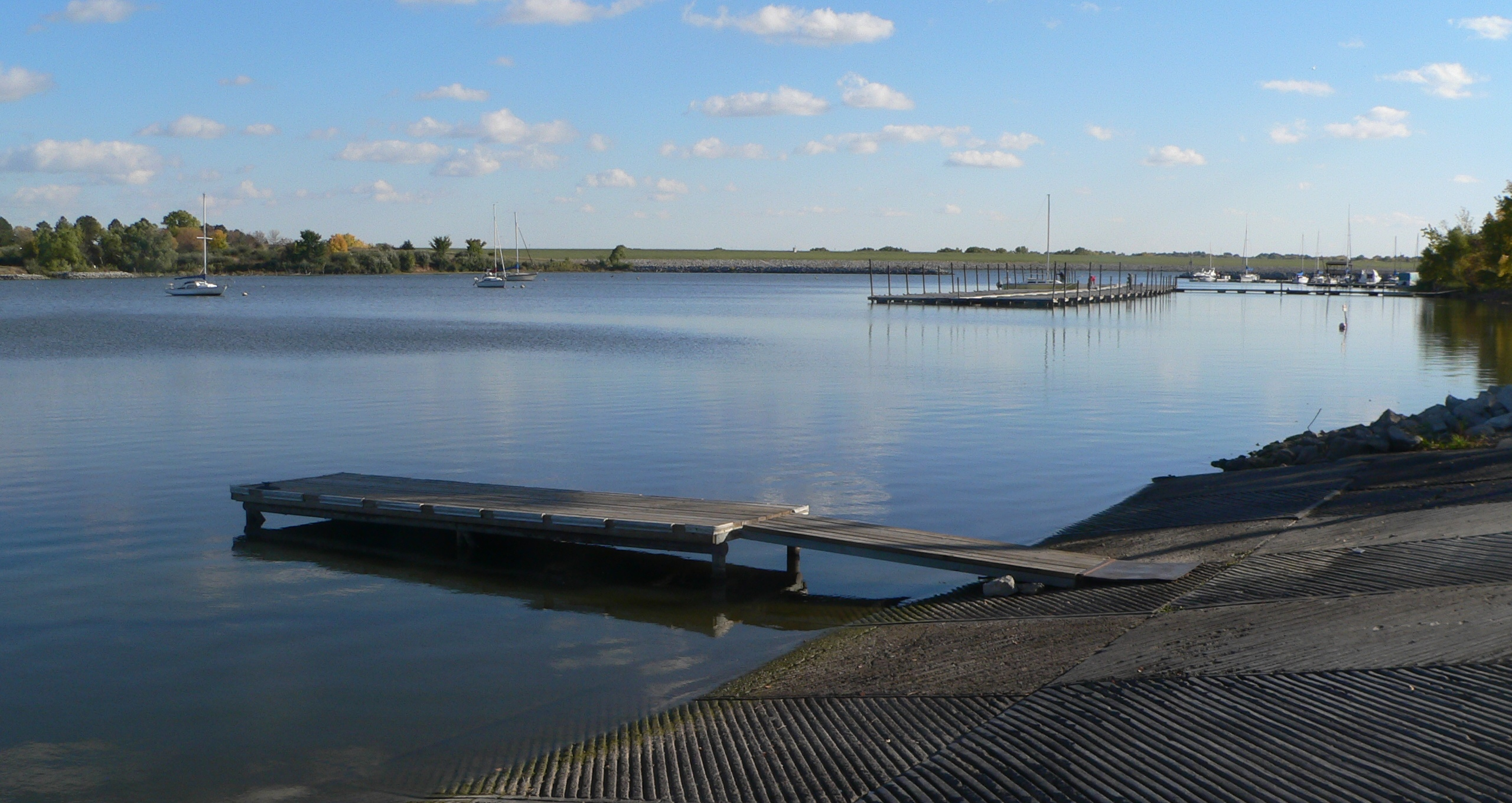
Branched Oak Lake marina

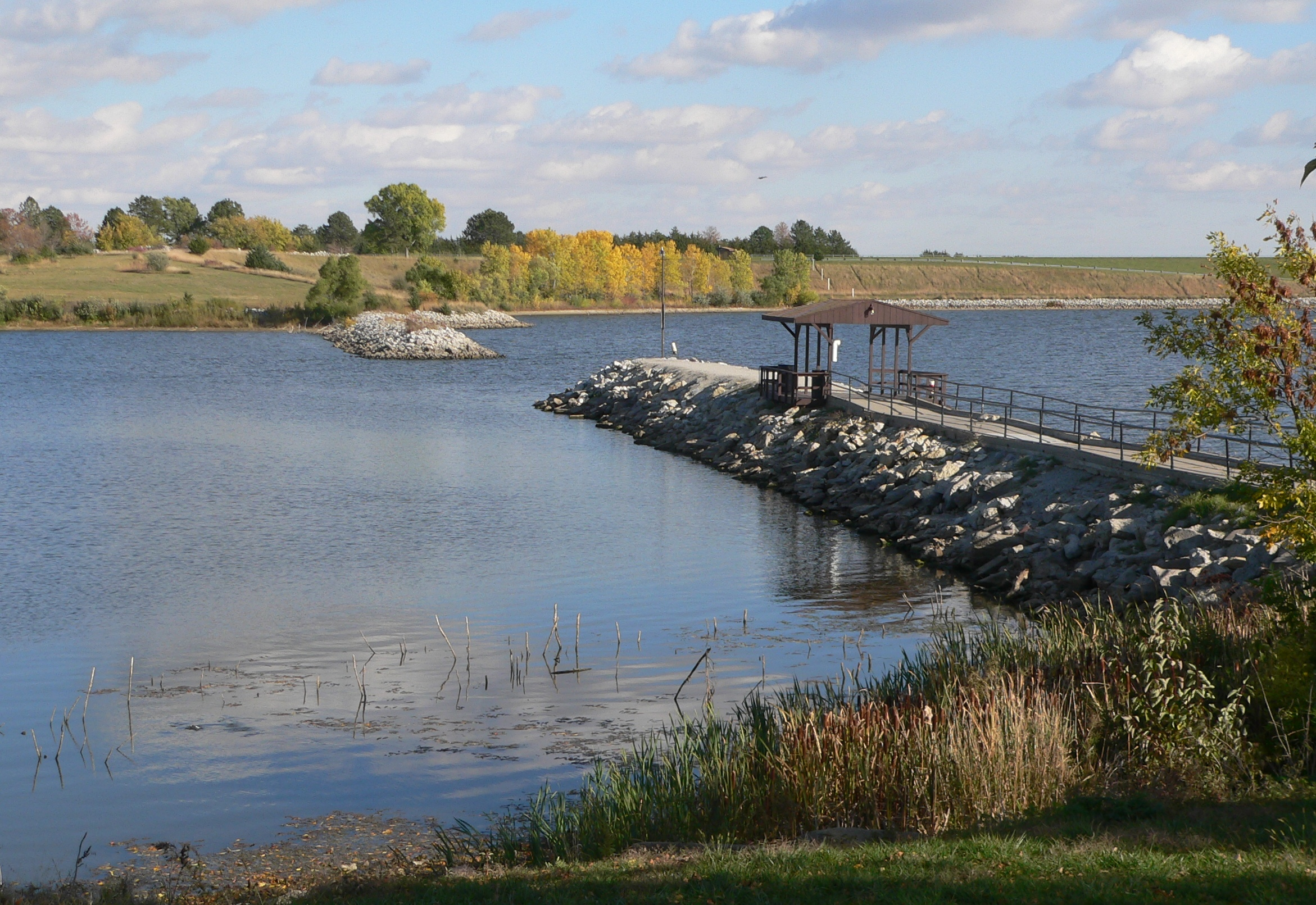
Branched Oak Lake marina breakwall

== See also ==
- Salt Valley Lakes
- Lancaster County, Nebraska
