= Randolph, Nebraska =

- City
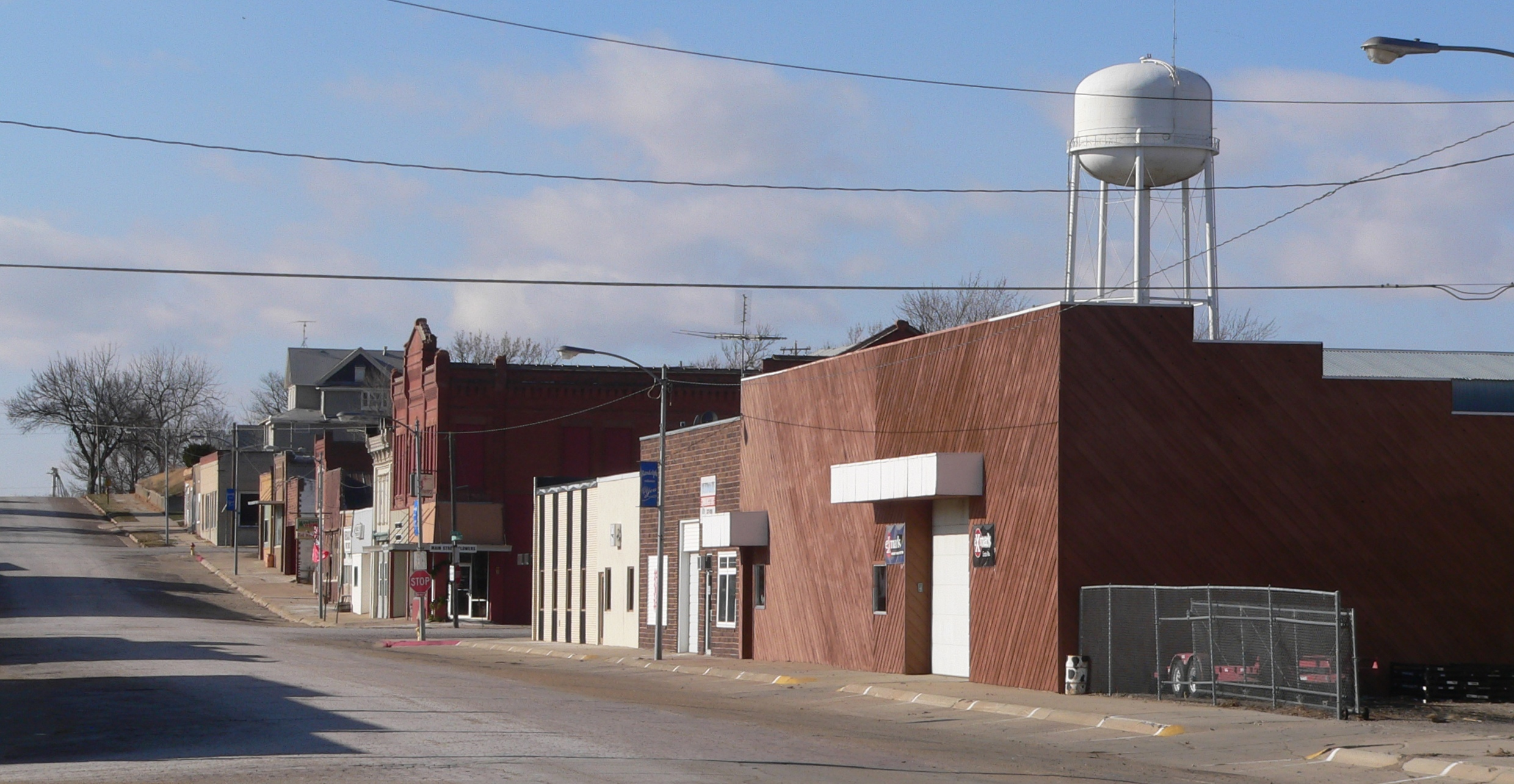
- Broadway Street

- Location of Randolph, Nebraska
- Coordinates: 42°22′40″N 97°21′28″W
- Country: United States
- State: Nebraska
- County: Cedar
- Incorporated: 1889

Area
  - Total: 1.05 sq mi (2.71 km^{2})
  - Land: 1.05 sq mi (2.71 km^{2})
  - Water: 0 sq mi (0.00 km^{2})
- Elevation: 1,657 ft (505 m)

Population (2020)
  - Total: 879
  - Density: 840.7/sq mi (324.58/km^{2})
- Time zone: UTC-6 (Central (CST))
  - Summer (DST): UTC-5 (CDT)
- ZIP code: 68771
- Area code: 402
- FIPS code: 31-40675
- GNIS feature ID: 2396319
- Website: randolphne.com

Randolph is a city in Cedar County, Nebraska, United States. The population was 881 at the 2020 census. It refers to itself as "The Honey Capital of the Nation" due to the per-capita number of bee keeping families.

== History ==
Randolph got its start in the year 1886, following construction of the railroad through the territory. It was named for Lord Randolph Churchill, a British statesman. Randolph was incorporated on May 7, 1889.

== Geography ==
According to the United States Census Bureau, the city has a total area of 0.94 square miles (2.43 km^{2}), all land.

U.S. Route 20 serves the community, and U.S. Route 81 passes just west of the city.

== Demographics ==
Historical population
Census	Pop.	Note	%±
1890	374		—
1900	850		127.3%
1910	1,137		33.8%
1920	1,338		17.7%
1930	1,145		−14.4%
1940	1,094		−4.5%
1950	1,029		−5.9%
1960	1,063		3.3%
1970	1,130		6.3%
1980	1,106		−2.1%
1990	983		−11.1%
2000	955		−2.8%
2010	944		−1.2%
2020	879		−6.9%
U.S. Decennial Census

=== 2010 census ===
At the 2010 census there were 944 people in 402 households, including 258 families, in the city. The population density was 1,004.3 inhabitants per square mile (387.8/km^{2}). There were 453 housing units at an average density of 481.9 per square mile (186.1/km^{2}). The racial makeup of the city was 97.4% White, 0.3% Native American, 0.2% Asian, 1.7% from other races, and 0.4% from two or more races. Hispanic or Latino of any race were 2.2%.

Of the 402 households 24.4% had children under the age of 18 living with them, 54.2% were married couples living together, 6.7% had a female householder with no husband present, 3.2% had a male householder with no wife present, and 35.8% were non-families. 33.1% of households were one person and 18.4% were one person aged 65 or older. The average household size was 2.24 and the average family size was 2.84.

The median age was 47.5 years. 22.7% of residents were under the age of 18; 5.6% were between the ages of 18 and 24; 18.4% were from 25 to 44; 25.1% were from 45 to 64; and 28.2% were 65 or older. The gender makeup of the city was 47.2% male and 52.8% female.

=== 2000 census ===
At the 2000 census there were 955 people in 409 households, including 265 families, in the city. The population density was 1,016.9 inhabitants per square mile (392.6/km^{2}). There were 447 housing units at an average density of 476.0 per square mile (183.8/km^{2}). The racial makeup of the city was 98.95% White, 0.10% African American, 0.31% Native American, 0.31% Asian, 0.21% from other races, and 0.10% from two or more races. Hispanic or Latino of any race were 0.21%.

Of the 409 households 27.1% had children under the age of 18 living with them, 57.5% were married couples living together, 5.9% had a female householder with no husband present, and 35.0% were non-families. 33.0% of households were one person and 21.8% were one person aged 65 or older. The average household size was 2.24 and the average family size was 2.83.

The age distribution was 22.7% under the age of 18, 5.0% from 18 to 24, 22.8% from 25 to 44, 18.3% from 45 to 64, and 31.1% 65 or older. The median age was 45 years. For every 100 females, there were 90.6 males. For every 100 females age 18 and over, there were 84.0 males.

The median household income was $30,486, and the median family income was $40,000. Males had a median income of $28,125 versus $13,500 for females. The per capita income for the city was $19,343. About 4.9% of families and 7.0% of the population were below the poverty line, including 7.8% of those under age 18 and 9.7% of those age 65 or over.

== Education ==
Randolph Public Schools are part of the Randolph Public School District. The district includes an elementary school and high school. Students attend Randolph High School.
