= Willow Creek State Recreation Area (Nebraska) =

Recreation area in Nebraska, United States

- Location within Nebraska Location within the United States
- Location: Pierce, Nebraska, United States
- Coordinates: 42.171111°N 97.562783°W
- Area: 1,633 acres (6.61 km^{2})
- Governing body: Nebraska Game and Parks Commission

Willow Creek State Recreation Area (SRA) is a state park in northeastern Nebraska, United States. The recreation area is located on the 700 acre Willow Creek Reservoir, approximately 4 miles (6.4 km) southwest of Pierce, or about 15 miles (24 km) northwest of Norfolk. The recreation area is managed by the Nebraska Game and Parks Commission.

The area is popular for boating, fishing, camping, and swimming. The reservoir is stocked with crappie, bluegill, bass, catfish, walleye, and northern pike. There are 101 RV campsites with electrical hookups and an equestrian campground with 10 campsites. There is a 10 mile long hiking and biking trail.

== See also ==
- Nebraska Game and Parks Commission
