= Sherman Dam =

Earthen dam in the United States

Coordinates: 41°18′12″N 98°52′51″W

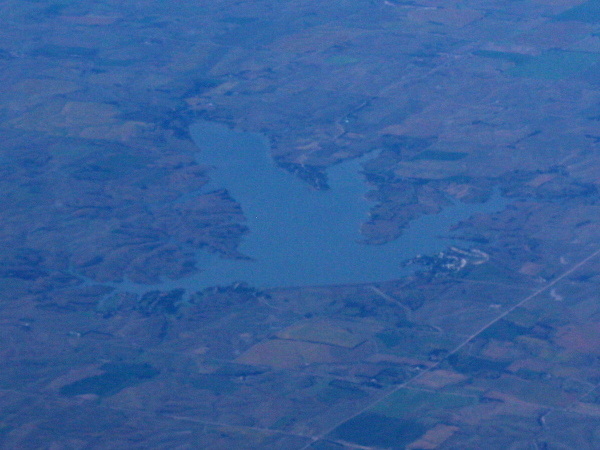
Oblique air photo of Sherman Reservoir, facing approximately north, in September 2018.

Sherman Dam is an earthen dam near Loup City, in the central part of the state of Nebraska in the Midwestern United States. It was constructed in 1961 by the United States Bureau of Reclamation. It has a height of 134 feet (41 m) and a length of 1,912 feet (583 m) at its crest. It impounds Oak Creek. The dam was originally constructed for flood control and irrigation, but is now owned and operated by the local Farwell Irrigation District and the Loup Basin Reclamation District.

The reservoir it creates, Sherman Reservoir, has a water surface of 2,845 acres (1,151 ha), surrounded by 4,721 acres (1,911 ha) of land. It has a maximum capacity of about 69,000 acre-feet (85,000,000 m^{3}). Recreation includes fishing, hunting, boating via multiple marinas and boat ramps, camping, and hiking. The northern shore borders the Sherman Reservoir State Recreational Area.

Primitive camping includes 360 non-pad sites. Facilities include picnic tables, shelters, water, dump station, modern restrooms, vault toilets, four boat ramps, fish cleaning stations, coin-operated showers and concession. Cabin rental and RV camping pads are available.

Sherman Reservoir is a popular fishing location in central Nebraska. The most popular species sought by anglers are walleye, crappie, catfish, white bass, and northern pike. Fishing typically begins in March when northern pike can be caught in the shallow waters of coves and bays. Fishing for walleye during their April spawning period is very popular. Walleye fishing usually peaks in May–June. White bass fishing typically has two peaks—one in April–May and the second peak in mid-summer. Crappie catches are excellent in May as the reservoir fills and flooded habitat is available in the coves and bays. Ice-fishing for crappie and walleye can also be productive over submerged cover or habitat. Channel catfish provide good angling opportunities throughout the summer months, and large flathead catfish provide the possibility for trophy-sized fish.
