= Salt Valley Lakes =

Lakes in Nebraska, U.S.

The Salt Valley Lakes is a system of more than twenty lakes in Lancaster County, Nebraska. Many of the lakes are state recreation areas or wildlife areas. All of the lakes are within twenty-five miles of Lincoln, Nebraska. "These areas around Lincoln cover 15,039 total acres, with 4,438 acres of water."

== Lakes ==
The individual lakes within the system number almost 25. Originally viewed as flood control reservoirs, they included Branched Oak, Pawnee, Conestoga, Yankee Hill, Olive Creek, Bluestem, Stagecoach, Wagon Train, Twin Lakes, Hedgefield, and Holmes.

Smaller reservoirs in the watershed include Wildwood, Meadowlark, Wild Plum, Merganser, Cottontail, Tanglewood, and Killdeer. Teal is another small one, but it usually does not have much water in it and has a limited fishery.

== See also ==
- List of lakes in Nebraska
