= Nebraska Game and Parks Commission =

U.S. state government agency

- Logo of the Nebraska Game and Parks Commission

Agency overview
- Formed: Established in 1901; 125 years ago, by the Nebraska Legislature
- Jurisdiction: State of Nebraska
- Headquarters: 2200 N. 33rd St., Lincoln, Nebraska 68503-0370; 40.834668°N 96.671812°W
- Agency executives: Tim McCoy, Director; Jim Swenson, Deputy Director
- Website: outdoornebraska.gov

Map
- Nebraska Game and Parks Jurisdiction within the State of Nebraska in the United States, highlighted in red.

The Nebraska Game and Parks Commission (NGPC) is the State of Nebraska's State agency charged with stewardship of the state's fish, wildlife, state park, and outdoor recreation resources. The agency is led by a governor-appointed member commission consisting of 9 commissioners which directs agency management. The commission is also charged with issuing of state hunting licenses, fishing licenses, and boat registrations. The agency also manages State Parks and recreation areas throughout the state. It conducts public education programs for hunting and boating safety. The agency is headquartered in Lincoln, Nebraska.

== Board of commissioners ==
The agency is governed by a board of nine commissioners, with one commissioner representing each of the eight commission districts and one At-Large commissioner. Each commissioner is appointed by the Governor and confirmed by the Legislature to a 6-year term. The commission meets six times per year. The following is the current makeup of Commissioners:

- Vacant, District 1
- Donna Kush, District 2 - Omaha
- Ken Curry, District 3 - Columbus
- John Hoggatt, District 4 - Kearney
- Dan Hughes, District 5 - Venango
- Pat Berggren, District 6 - Broken Bow
- Doug Zingula, District 7 - Sidney
- Rick Brandt, District 8 - Roca
- Scott Cassels, At Large - Omaha

== District offices ==
The Game and Parks Commission operates four regional offices:

- Northwest District in Alliance
- Southwest District in North Platte
- Northeast District in Norfolk
- Southeast District in Lincoln

In addition, service centers that issue hunting & fishing licenses and issue other permits are located in: Bassett, Kearney, Gretna, and Omaha.

== State parks and recreation areas ==
See main article: List of Nebraska state parks

Among the park facilities controlled by the commission are the state's 85 state-owned parks facilities, divided into four categories:

- State Parks – Areas of scientific, historic, or scenic value that are of sufficient size to be developed for public use without infringing on the primary value of the area.
- State Recreation Areas – Areas primarily of outdoor recreational value. All the state's water-oriented parks fall into this category.
- State Historical Parks – Areas primarily of significant historical value.
- State Recreation Trails – Linear corridors of statewide or regional value designed for non-motorized recreational use.

== Wildlife management ==
The agency manages over 250 state wildlife management areas. The acquisition and maintenance of these areas is funded entirely through hunting and fishing license fees. Primitive camping is generally allowed in these areas.

== Law enforcement ==
Nebraska Game and Parks Commission - Division of Law Enforcement (Conservation Officers)
- Abbreviation: GPC

Jurisdictional structure
- Operations jurisdiction: Nebraska, U.S.
- Area: 77,421 square miles (200,520 km^{2})
- Population: 1,774,571 (2007 est.)
- Governing body: Nebraska Game and Parks Commission
- General nature: Civilian police

Operational structure
- Headquarters: Lincoln, Nebraska
- Conservation Officers: 61 (as of 2023)
- Agency executive: Craig Stover, Law Enforcement Division Administrator
- Patrol Districts: 4 - Northwest (Scottsbluff), Southeast (Lincoln), Northeast (Norfolk), and Southwest (North Platte)

Website
- http://outdoornebraska.gov/conservationofficers/

The commission is charged with enforcement of fish, wildlife, boating, and other state and federal laws and regulations within the state. Conservation officers patrol public lands including state parks, wildlife management areas, rivers, lakes, and other areas for law violations. Conservation officers are fully commissioned State law enforcement officers and can enforce all state laws and regulations throughout the state. These officers also conduct public outreach to educate the public on water safety, firearm safety, and stewardship of public natural resources.

=== Law enforcement patrol districts ===
- Southeast District - Lincoln, covering the counties of Butler, Cass, Douglas, Fillmore, Gage, Jefferson, Johnson, Lancaster, Nemaha, Otoe, Pawnee, Polk, Richardson, Saline, Seward, Saunders, Sarpy, Thayer, and York.
- Northeast District - Norfolk, covering the counties of Antelope, Burt, Brown, Boone, Boyd, Cedar, Cuming, Colfax, Dakota, Dixon, Dodge, Garfield, Greeley, Holt, Keya Paha, Knox, Loup, Madison, Pierce, Platte, Rock, Stanton, Thurston, Valley, Washington, Wayne, and Wheeler.
- Southwest District - North Platte, covering the counties of Adams, Arthur, Blaine, Buffalo, Clay, Chase, Custer, Dawson, Dundy, Furnas, Franklin, Frontier, Gosper, Hall, Hamilton, Harlan, Hayes, Hitchcock, Howard, Keith, Lincoln, Logan, McPherson, Merrick, Nuckolls, Perkins, Phelps, Red Willow, Sherman, Thomas, and Webster.
- Northwest District - Scottsbluff, covering the counties of Banner, Box Butte, Cherry, Dawes, Deuel, Garden, Grant, Hooker, Kimball, Scotts Bluff, Sheridan, and Sioux.

== See also ==
- List of Nebraska state parks
- List of law enforcement agencies in Nebraska
- Conservation officer
- List of state and territorial fish and wildlife management agencies in the United States
