= Big Bend (Missouri River) =

Meander in South Dakota

Coordinates: 44.121°N 99.589°W

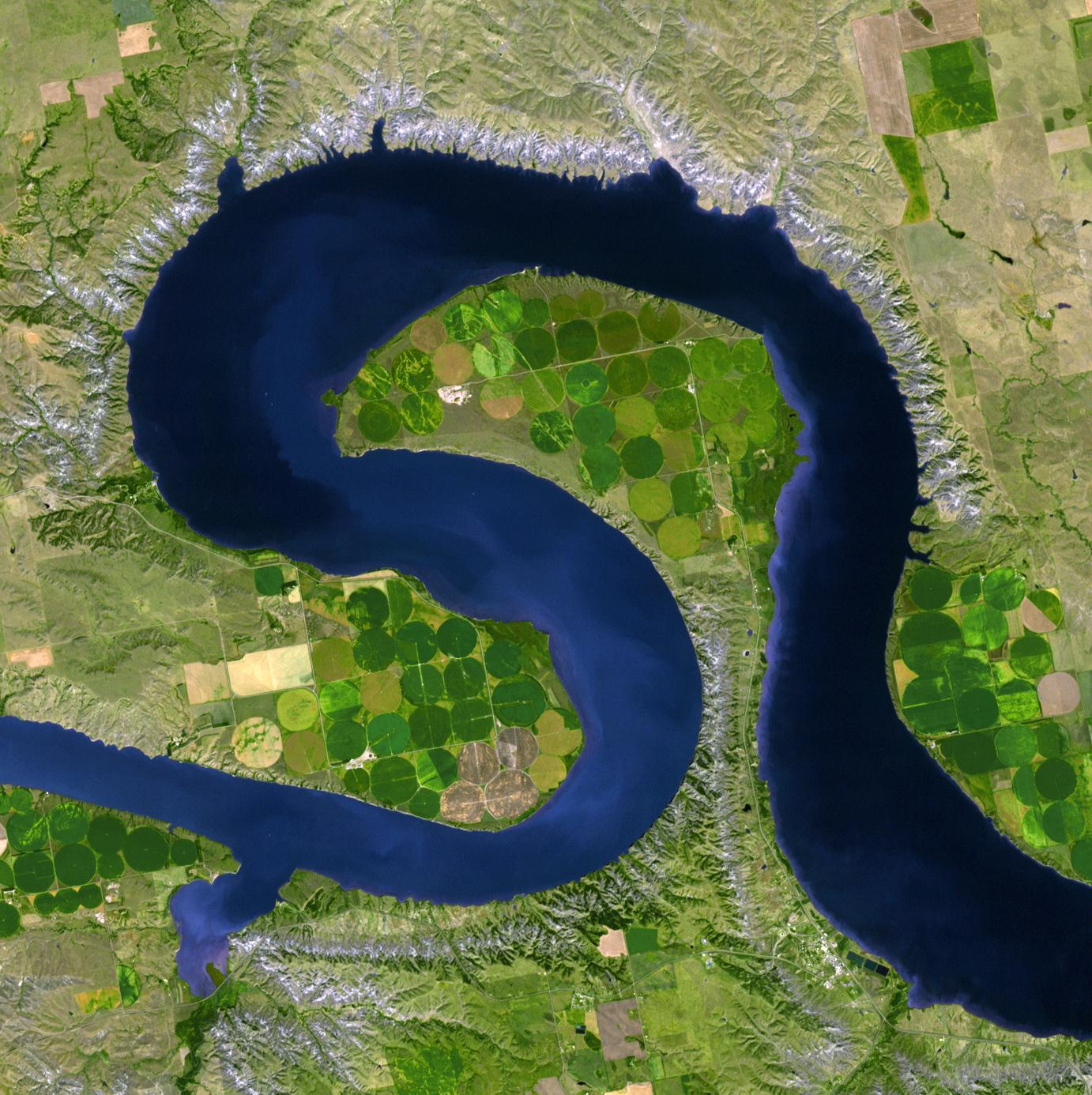
Satellite imagery of the Big Bend in Lake Sharpe, 2009

The Big Bend is a large meander of the Missouri River in South Dakota, now impounded by the Big Bend Dam, 7 miles (11 km) to its south, as part of Lake Sharpe.

The meander is about 22 miles (35 km) long and at its narrowest, its neck is about 3,440 feet (1.05 km) wide. The land within the bend and on its right bank is part of the Lower Brule Indian Reservation, while the land on the left bank is part of the Crow Creek Indian Reservation.

The Lewis and Clark National Historic Trail passes through Big Bend.

...detached [two scouts] to the 1st. Creek abov the big bend with the horse to hunt and wait our arrival proceeded on passed the lower Island opposite which the Sand bars are verry thick & the water Shoal. I walked on Shore with a view of examining this bend Crossed at the narost part which is a high irregular hills of about 180 or 190 feet, this place the gorge of the Bend is 1 mile & a quarter (from river to river or) across, from this high land which is only in the Gouge, the bend is a Butifull Plain thro which I walked

— — William Clark, 1804

== External references ==
- National Park Service, "Big Bend of the Missouri"
- Discovering Lewis & Clark, "The Big Bend of the Missouri"
- Big Bend Boating & Recreation Maps
- Missouri River Commission map, 1894
