= Vernon Ashley =

American politician

Vernon Lewis Ashley (January 16, 1916 – November 10, 2015) was a Native American leader.

== Career ==
Born on the banks of the Missouri River, Ashley was chairman of the Crow Creek Indian Reservation in South Dakota. The tribe adapted their first constitution while Ashley was in office. The development of Lake Sharpe and the flooding of tribal lands also took place during Ashley's term in office. Later, Ashley worked for the Bureau of Indian Affairs and was the first coordinator of Indian Affairs for the state of South Dakota.

== Personal life ==
Ashley graduated from Flandreau Indian School and then served in the United States Army Air Forces during World War II. In 1952 Ashley received his bachelor's degree from Dakota Wesleyan University. On July 15, 2015, the Crow Creek Sioux Tribe made him chief of the tribe.
