= Elizabeth Cook-Lynn =

Native American writer (1930–2023)

- Born: November 17, 1930; Fort Thompson, South Dakota, Crow Creek Reservation, U.S.
- Died: July 5, 2023 (aged 92); Rapid City, South Dakota, U.S.
- Citizenship: Crow Creek Sioux Tribe, American
- Education: South Dakota State College (BA) University of South Dakota (M.Ed.) University of Nebraska–Lincoln (Ph.D.)

Elizabeth Cook-Lynn (born Elizabeth Irving, November 17, 1930 – July 5, 2023) was a Native American editor, essayist, poet, and novelist. She was considered to be outspoken in her views about Native American politics, particularly in regards to tribal sovereignty.

Cook-Lynn criticized those who make tenuous claims to Native/Indigenous ancestry with the purpose of advancing their own careers, and described such claimants with no community connections as "tribeless". She believed they damage the development of economic and social life of Native nations.

== Biography ==
Cook-Lynn was born in Fort Thompson, South Dakota on the Crow Creek Reservation. She was a Dakota and member of the Crow Creek Sioux Tribe. There, she attended school on the Big Bend Reservation. She was raised in a family of scholars and politicians, with both her father and grandfather serving on the Crow Creek Sioux Tribal Council. Her grandmother wrote in English and Dakota for Christian newspapers. Her great-grandfather, Gabriel Renville, was a Native linguist and pioneer of early Dakota-language dictionaries.

Cook-Lynn attended South Dakota State College (which later became South Dakota State University) where she earned a BA in English and Journalism. In college, she took a history class about westward expansion and was surprised that it ignored the Native American presence in the region. This sparked her interest in advocating for Native Americans. Cook-Lynn states that she began to write out of anger, as an "act of defiance born of the need to survive ... as Simon Ortiz says, it is an act that defies oppression."

Cook-Lynn did graduate studies at New Mexico State University in 1966, Black Hills State College in 1968, and finished her doctorate program at the University of Nebraska–Lincoln in 1978. Prior to receiving her doctorate, Cook-Lynn was selected as a National Endowment for the Humanities fellow and studied in 1976 at Stanford University.

In 1985 Cook-Lynn co-founded Wíčazo Ša Review ("Red Pencil"), an academic journal devoted to Native American studies as an academic discipline. The other founding editors were Beatrice Medicine, Roger Buffalohead, and William Willard. Cook-Lynn has both written and taught in her academic career.

Cook-Lynn taught at multiple high schools in New Mexico and South Dakota, and has been a visiting professor at University of California Davis. Most notably, Cook-Lynn served as a professor of English and Native Studies at Eastern Washington University. She started this position in 1971, and became Professor Emerita in 1990. She has also served as a writer-in-residence at multiple universities, and was a visiting professor at Arizona State University in 2000.

In her book, You May Consider Speaking About Your Art, Cook-Lynn states that the contemporary poet is someone who must "consecrate history and event, survival and joy and sorrow, the significance of ancestors and the unborn." Her first book, Then Badger Said This (1977) "illustrated multi-genre exploration of the sources of Dakotah life and values." She acknowledges writer N. Scott Momaday in the creation of the book.

Cook-Lynn opposed the presidency of Donald Trump and the governorship of Kristi Noem, accusing the SDGOP of holding a "regime" over the state and restricting peoples rights in terms of assembly, speech, and access to abortion procedures. She continued to criticize Noem even after the governor declared Sioux the official indigenous language / co-official language of the state. Cook-Lynn has said that certain tribes with more cordial relations with the Federal Government, such as those in Oklahoma, Montana and Idaho, are "Vichy Indians," referring to Occupied France during World War II and the words of Oglala Lakota activist Russell Means.

Cook-Lynn died in Rapid City, South Dakota on July 5, 2023, at the age of 92.

== Awards ==
- 1978 National Endowment for the Humanities fellowship
- 1995 Oyate Igluwitaya by the Native American Club at South Dakota State University
- Why I Can't Read Wallace Stegner and Other Essays : A Tribal Voice, cited for a Gustavus Myers Award
- South Dakota Living Indian Treasure Award
- Distinguished Native American Alumnus Award
- 2002 Literary Contribution Award from the Mountain Plains Library Association
- 2007 Lifetime Achievement Award by the Native Writers' Circle of the Americas

== Bibliography ==
- From the river's edge (NY: Arcade, 1991).
- At Dawn, Sitting in My Father's House

=== Poetry ===
- I remember the fallen trees : new and selected poems (Cheney, WA: Eastern Washington University Press, 1998).

=== Short stories ===
- Then Badger said this (Fairfield, WA: Ye Galleon Press, 1983).
- Seek the house of relatives (Marvin, SD: Blue Cloud Quarterly Press, 1983).
- The power of horses and other stories (NY: Arcade, 1990).

=== Non-fiction ===
- Why I can't read Wallace Stegner and other essays : a tribal voice (Madison : University of Wisconsin Press, 1996).
- Politics of Hallowed Ground : Wounded Knee and the Struggle for Indian Sovereignty (with Mario Gonzalez) (Illinois UP, 1999).
- Aurelia (Boulder, CO: University of Colorado Press, 1999).
- Anti-Indianism in Modern America: A Voice from Tatekeya's Earth (Illinois UP 2001).
- New Indians, Old Wars (Urbana, IL: University of Illinois Press, 2007).
- A Separate Country: Postcoloniality and American Indian Nations (Texas Tech University Press, 2011).
- That Guy Wolf Dancing (East Lansing, MI: Michigan State University Press, 2014).
- In Defense of Loose Translations (Lincoln, NE: University of Nebraska Press, 2018).

== See also ==
- List of writers from peoples indigenous to the Americas
- Native American Renaissance
- Native American Studies
