= Michael Jandreau =

American politician (1943–2015)

Chairman of the Lower Brule Sioux Tribe
- In office 1974–1976
- Deputy: Grace Estes
- Preceded by: Orville Langdeau Sr.
- Succeeded by: Richard Thompson Sr.
- In office 1978–1980
- Deputy: Orville Langdeau Sr
- Preceded by: Richard Thompson Sr.
- Succeeded by: Orville Langdeau Sr.
- In office 1984 – April 2018
- Deputy: Kay Gourneau; Ramona Johnson; Orville Langdeau Jr; Sandy LaCroix; Boyd Gourneau; Kevin W. Wright
- Preceded by: Patrick Spears

Vice Chairman of the Lower Brule Sioux Tribe
- In office 1972–1974
- Leader: Orville Langdeau Sr
- Preceded by: Orville Langdeau Sr
- Succeeded by: Grace Estes

Council Member Lower Brule Sioux Tribe
- In office 1976–1978
- Leader: Richard Thompson Sr
- Preceded by: Everette Wilson Sr
- Succeeded by: Ted Rouillard
- In office 1980–1984
- Leader: Orville Langdeau Sr (1980-1982), Patrick Spears (1982-1984)
- Preceded by: Ted Rouillard
- Succeeded by: Ted Rouillard

Personal details
- Born: October 20, 1943 Fort Thompson, SD
- Died: April 3, 2015 (aged 71) Sioux Falls, SD
- Spouse: Jackie Jandreau
- Profession: Tribal Leader

Michael B. Jandreau (October 20, 1943 – April 3, 2015) was a Native American leader.

== Background ==
Born in Fort Thompson, South Dakota, to Leo (Tete) Burdette Jandreau and Dorothy Belva (Langdeau) Jandreau Jones, Jandreau was the chairman of the Lower Brule Sioux Tribe now centered on the Lower Brule Sioux-Lakota Reservation, one of several tribal governments in South Dakota. He was a leader on the reservation, and served as the chief executive officer of the Tribe. He began in 1972 as Vice Chairman, at which time the Tribal Council elected the officers of the council from its members. In 1986, Jandreau was elected as the first Tribal Council Chairman to be elected at large for the Lower Brule Sioux-Lakota Tribe.

He started many of the tribe's projects, including the Lower Brule Wildlife Program and the Golden Buffalo Casino. Jandreau died on April 3, 2015, in Sioux Falls, South Dakota.

== Service on Lower Brule Sioux Tribal Council ==
Position	Terms	Years served
Chairman	18	1974–1976; 1978–1980; 1984–2015
Vice-chairman	1	1972–1974
Sergent-At-Arms	1	1976–1978
Councilman	2	1980–1984

== Service on Regional and National Boards & Committees ==
Committee or Board	Agency/Authority	Position/Title
Bureau of Indian Affairs Reorganization Committee	Department of the Interior	Representative
Bureau of Indian Affairs Trust Fund Consultation Task Force	Department of the Interior	Representative, Great Plains Region
Great Plains Tribal Chairmen's Health Board (GPTCHB)	Liaison between Great Plains Area Indian Health Service (GPAIHS) and Great Plains tribes	Member
Missouri River Recovery Implementation Committee	United States Congress	Member
Native American Advisory Committee	United States Department of Agriculture	Member
Native American Advisory Committee	South Dakota Historic Preservation Society	Member

== Testimony Before Congress ==
Date	Session	House of Congress	Committee	Subcommittee
September 3, 1993	103rd Congress, 1st Session	Senate	Small Business	N/A
June 6, 2002	107th Congress, 2nd Session	Senate	Banking, Housing, and Urban Affairs	Financial Institutions
May 18, 2005	109th Congress, 1st Session	Senate	Indian Affairs	N/A
June 14, 2006	109th Congress, 2nd Session	Senate	Indian Affairs	N/A
June 1, 2007	110th Congress, 1st Session	House of Representatives	Natural Resources	N/A
November 1, 2007	110th Congress, 1st Session	Senate	Indian Affairs	N/A

== Fiscal Accountability ==
Under Chairman Jandreau's leadership, the Lower Brule Sioux Tribe was among the most timely of tribes in the Northern Great Plains' Region to file Single Audit reports each fiscal year. The opinions of audit firms for Fiscal Years 1997 through 2013 generally reflected the Tribe's commitment to strong internal controls and to following its fiscal policies and procedures. The Lower Brule Sioux Tribe received Unqualified (Unmodified) audit reports for twelve of these seventeen audit years, and Qualified (Modified) audit reports for the other five years. Moreover, with regard to Major Program Compliance, the Tribe was only issued Qualified (Modified) opinions two out of the seventeen aforementioned fiscal years. Copies of the Lower Brule Sioux Tribe's Single Audit Reports for FY1997 thru FY2013 are freely available on the Federal Audit Clearinghouse website (https://web.archive.org/web/20000619103409/http://harvester.census.gov/).
