= Crow Reservation =

Crow Reservation may refer to:

- Crow Indian Reservation in Montana, associated with the Crow Nation
- Crow Creek Reservation in South Dakota, associated with the Crow Creek Sioux Tribe
