= Oahe Dam =

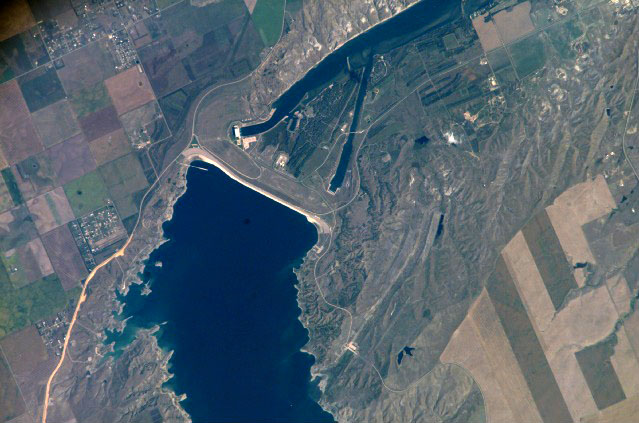
- Oahe Dam from the International Space Station

- Location within South Dakota
- Location: Hughes/Stanley counties, South Dakota
- Coordinates: 44°27′07″N 100°23′57″W
- Construction began: 1948; 78 years ago
- Opening date: 1962; 64 years ago
- Construction cost: $340 Million
- Operators: U.S. Army Corps of Engineers, Omaha District

Dam and spillways
- Type of dam: Embankment, Rolled-earth fill & shale berms
- Impounds: Missouri River
- Height: 245 feet (75 m)
- Length: 9,360 feet (2,850 m)
- Width (base): 3,500 feet (1,100 m)
- Dam volume: 93,122,000 cubic yards (71,197,000 m^{3})
- Spillways: 8 50-foot x 23.5-foot tainter gates
- Spillway capacity: 304,000 cfs at 1,644.4 feet msl pool elevation

Reservoir
- Creates: Lake Oahe
- Total capacity: 23,137,000 acre-feet (28.539 km^{3})
- Surface area: 374,000 acres (151,000 ha) (max)

Power Station
- Commission date: April 1962–June 1963
- Turbines: 7x 112.29 MW
- Installed capacity: 786 MW
- Annual generation: 2,621 GWh
- Website; U.S. Army Corps of Engineers - Oahe Project

The Oahe Dam (/oʊˈɑːhiː/) is a large earthen dam on the Missouri River, just north of Pierre, South Dakota, United States. Begun in 1948 and opened in 1962, the dam creates Lake Oahe, the fourth-largest man-made reservoir in the United States. The reservoir stretches 231 miles (372 km) up the course of the Missouri to Bismarck, North Dakota. The dam's power plant provides electricity for much of the north-central United States. It is named for the Oahe Indian Mission established among the Lakota Sioux in 1874.

The project provides flood control, hydropower generation, irrigation, and navigation benefits. The Oahe Dam is one of six Missouri River mainstem dams, the next dam upstream is Garrison Dam, near Riverdale, North Dakota, and the next dam downstream is Big Bend Dam, near Fort Thompson, South Dakota.

South Dakota Highway 204 runs directly atop the Oahe Dam, providing an automobile crossing of the Missouri River at the dam.

== History ==
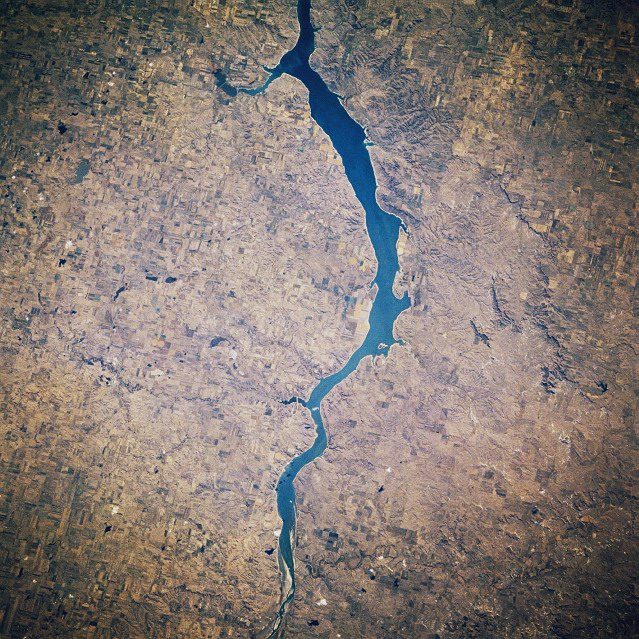
Upper Lake Oahe (Reservoir), between Pollock, South Dakota, and Cannon Ball, North Dakota, as seen from space, October 1985. North is at the bottom of the photo.

In September and October 1804, the Lewis and Clark Expedition passed through what is now Lake Oahe while exploring the Missouri River.

The Oahe Dam was authorized by the Flood Control Act of 1944, and construction by the United States Army Corps of Engineers began in 1948. The world's first rock tunnel boring machine was invented in 1952 by James S. Robbins for the Oahe Dam project, which marked the beginning of machines replacing human tunnelers. The earth main dam reached its full height in October 1959. It was officially dedicated by President John F. Kennedy on August 17, 1962, the year in which it began generating power. The original project cost was $340,000,000.

== Statistics ==
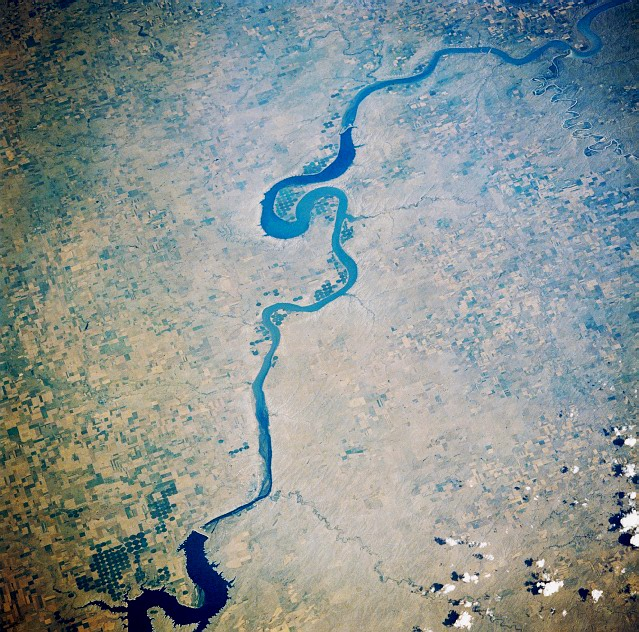
Looking southeast from space, August, 1989. The lower Oahe Reservoir and Oahe Dam are near the bottom of this view; Lake Sharpe and Big Bend Dam are near the top. Pierre, South Dakota is near the bottom of the photo; Chamberlain, South Dakota is near the top.

- Dam height: 245 feet (75 m)
- Dam volume of earth fill: 92,000,000 cubic yards (70,000,000 m^{3})
- Dam volume of concrete: 1,122,000 cubic yards (858,000 m^{3})
- Spillway width: 456 feet (139 m)
- Spillway crest elevation: 1,596.5 feet (486.6 m)
- Lake maximum depth: 205 feet (62 m)
- Plant discharge 56,000 cubic feet per second (1,600 m^{3}/s)
- Water speed through intake tunnels: 11 mph (5 m/s)
- Intake tunnel length: 3,650 feet (average) (1110 m)
- Number of turbines: 7, Francis type, 100 RPM
- Power generated per turbine: 112.29 MW
- reservoir storage capacity: 23,500,000 acre-feet (29.0 km^{3}).
- States served with electricity: North Dakota, South Dakota, Nebraska, Minnesota and Montana
- Number of recreation areas around lake: 51
- Shore length: 2,250 miles (3,620 km)
- Counties bordering lake: 14, including 4 in North Dakota (Burleigh, Emmons, Morton, Sioux), and 10 in South Dakota (Campbell, Corson, Dewey, Haakon, Hughes, Potter, Stanley, Sully, Walworth, and Ziebach)

== Tours ==
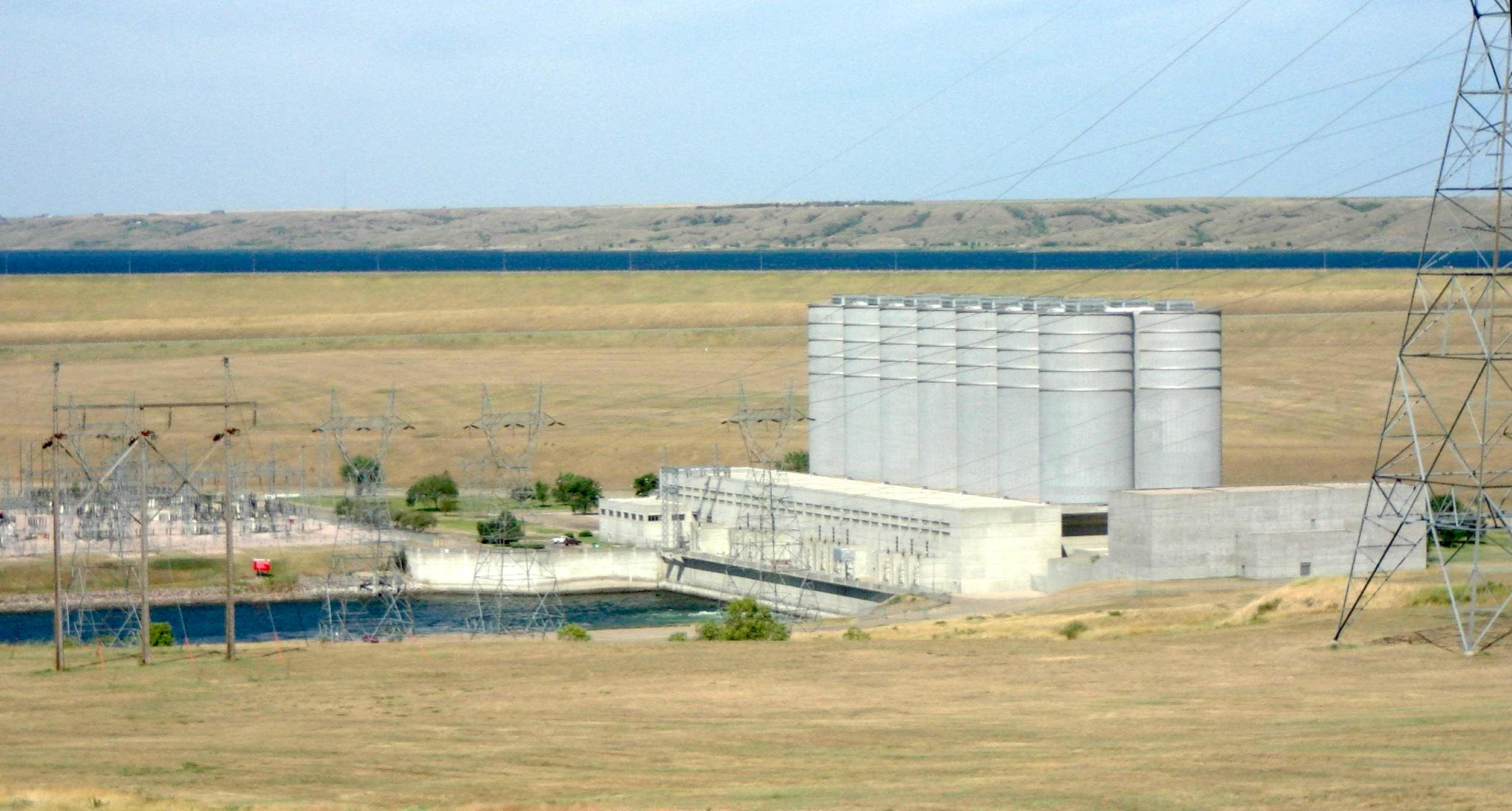
Oahe powerhouse showing surge tanks and powerhouse, looking to the north-west

Tours of the powerplant are given daily, Memorial Day through Labor Day.

== Native American displacement ==
As a result of the dam's construction the Cheyenne River Indian Reservation lost 150,000 acres (61,000 hectares) bringing it down to 2,850,000 acres (1,150,000 ha) today. The Standing Rock Reservation lost 55,993 acres (22,660 ha) leaving it with 2,300,000 acres (930,000 ha). Much of the land was taken by eminent domain claims made by the Bureau of Reclamation. Over and above the land loss, most of the reservations' prime agricultural land was included in the loss. The regions where the populations were resettled had soil with a higher clay content, and resources such as medicinal plants were less prevalent.

The loss of this land had a dramatic effect on the Natives who lived on the reservations. Most of the land was unable to be harvested (to allow the trees to be cut down for wood, etc.) before the land was flooded over with water. One visitor to the reservations later asked why there were so few older Natives on the reservations and was told that "the old people had died of heartache" after the construction of the dam and the loss of the reservations' land. As of 2015, poverty remains a problem for the displaced populations in the Dakotas, who are still seeking compensation for the loss of the towns submerged under Lake Oahe, and the loss of their traditional ways of life.

Huff Archeological Site is a fortified Mandan village site on what is now the bank of Lake Oahe. It is designated a National Historic Landmark, but is endangered by erosion pressure from the lake.

== 2011 flooding ==
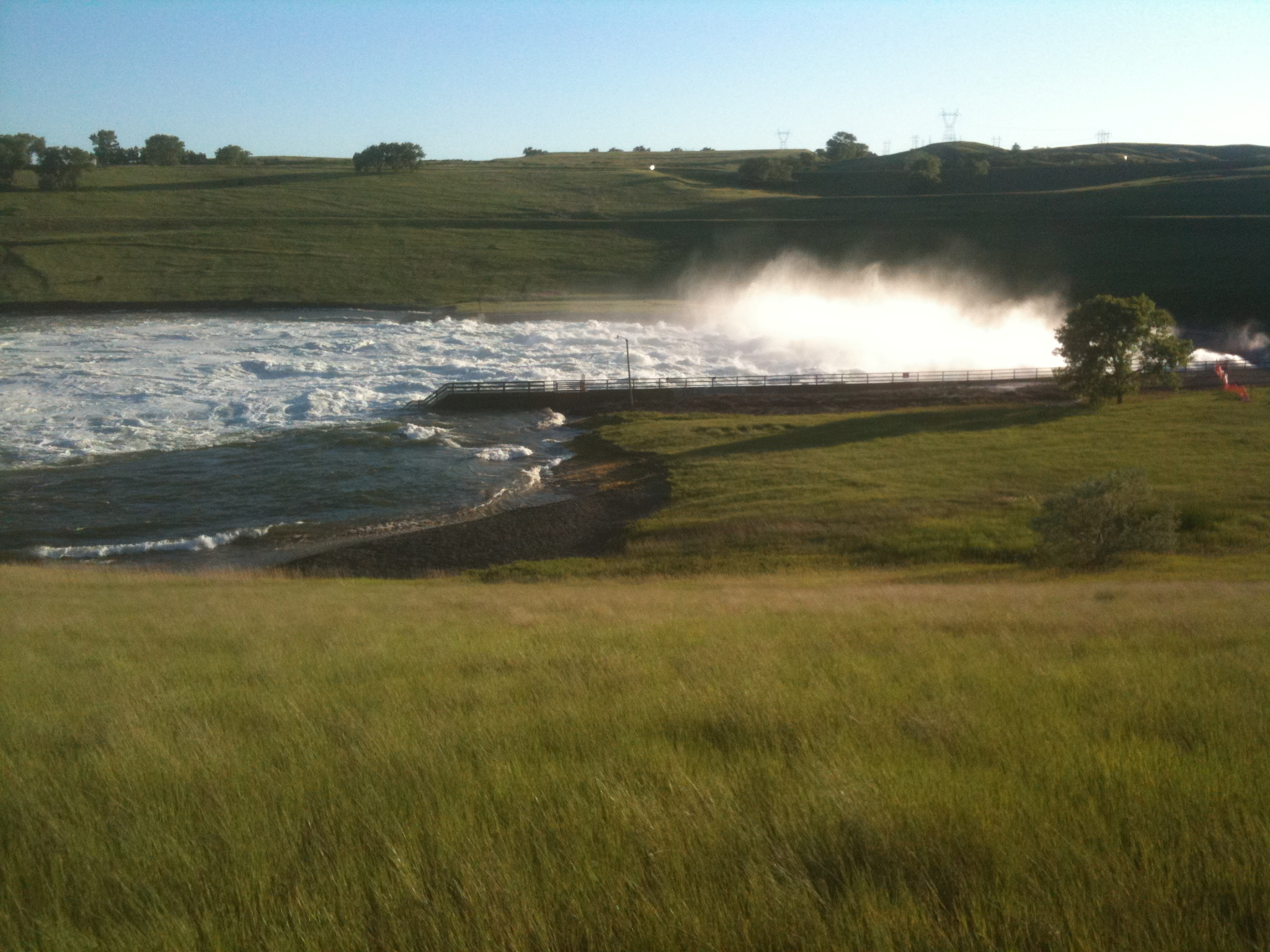
Oahe Dam release gates discharging floodwater at a record 160,000 cubic feet/second in June, 2011.

Excessive precipitation in the spring, along with melting snow from the Rocky Mountains forced the dam to open the release gates (not the spillway), releasing 110,000 cu ft/s (3,115 m^{3}/s) in June with another 50,000 cu ft/s (1,416 m^{3}/s) through the power plant totaling 160,000 cu ft/s (4,531 m^{3}/s). The previous release record was 53,900 cu ft/s (1,526 m^{3}/s) in 1997.

== See also ==
- Keystone Pipeline
- List of reservoirs and dams in the United States
