= Fort Thompson Mounds =

- U.S. National Register of Historic Places
- U.S. National Historic Landmark District
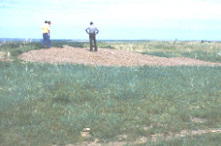
- One of the mounds

- Location within South Dakota Location within the United States
- Nearest city: Fort Thompson, South Dakota
- Coordinates: 44°2′0″N 99°22′40″W
- Area: 19.1 acres (7.7 ha)
- NRHP reference No.: 66000711

Significant dates
- Added to NRHP: October 15, 1966
- Designated NHLD: July 19, 1964

The Fort Thompson Mounds are a complex of ancient archaeological sites in Buffalo County, South Dakota, near Fort Thompson and within the Crow Creek Reservation. Declared a National Historic Landmark in 1964 by the US Department of Interior, the mound complex extends for a distance of about 6 miles (9.7 km) along the east bank of the Missouri River. It is one of the largest known complex of burial mounds in the Plains region north of Kansas.

One of the sites excavated in the 1950s was radiocarbon dated to c. 2450 BCE, showing nearly 5,000 years of indigenous human settlement. The mounds are believed to have been constructed in the Plains-Woodland period, beginning c. 800 CE.

== Description ==
The Fort Thompson Mounds are a series of low earthen mounds, extending from the eastern (downstream) end of the Missouri River's Big Bend, downriver along the eastern bank, past Fort Thompson and the Big Bend Dam. They are generally located on a terrace above the river's bottomlands, roughly 50 feet (15 m) above the river's typical level in the early 1960s. All of these are believed to be burial mounds, which in some cases overlay older cultural materials. The mounds generally date from Plains-Woodland times (c. 800) and were found to contain evidence of the first pottery-making peoples in the area.

The sites were known but not studied prior to the 1950s, when the United States Army Corps of Engineers began planning the construction of Big Bend Dam as part of a major flood control project of several dams on the Missouri River.

Beginning in 1957, archaeologists engaged in a series of digs to understand the sites better, and to perform salvage archaeology on sites that were likely to be inundated by the waters the dam would impound. In addition to burials found in the mounds, features of habitation were also discovered. These include stone hearths, pottery fragments, and stone tools. One of the sites excavated gave radiocarbon dates of c. 2450 BCE.

== See also ==
- List of burial mounds in the United States
- List of National Historic Landmarks in South Dakota
- National Register of Historic Places listings in Buffalo County, South Dakota
