= West Brule, South Dakota =

- Census-designated place
- Location within South Dakota Location within the United States
- Coordinates: 44°04′22″N 99°38′18″W
- Country: United States
- State: South Dakota
- County: Lyman

Area
  - Total: 1.18 sq mi (3.06 km^{2})
  - Land: 1.18 sq mi (3.06 km^{2})
  - Water: 0 sq mi (0.00 km^{2})
- Elevation: 1,778 ft (542 m)

Population (2020)
  - Total: 538
  - Density: 455.6/sq mi (175.89/km^{2})
- Time zone: UTC-6 (Central (CST))
  - Summer (DST): UTC-5 (CDT)
- ZIP Code: 57548 (Lower Brule)
- Area code: 605
- FIPS code: 46-70284
- GNIS feature ID: 2813043

West Brule is an unincorporated community and census-designated place (CDP) within the Lower Brule Indian Reservation in Lyman County, South Dakota, United States. It was first listed as a CDP prior to the 2020 census. The population of the CDP was 538 at the 2020 census.

It is in the northeast part of the county, 3 miles (5 km) west of Lower Brule and 1 mile (1.6 km) south of Lake Sharpe on the Missouri River.

== Demographics ==
Historical population
Census	Pop.	Note	%±
2020	538		—
U.S. Decennial Census
