= Iron Nation, South Dakota =

Iron Nation is an extinct town in Lyman County, in the U.S. state of South Dakota.

== History ==
A post office called Iron Nation was established in 1923, and remained in operation until 1938. The post office coords were 44.1233206°N 99.7492811°W. The town had the name of Iron Nation, a Brulé Lakota chief.
