= Big Bend Dam =

Dam on the Missouri River in South Dakota, US

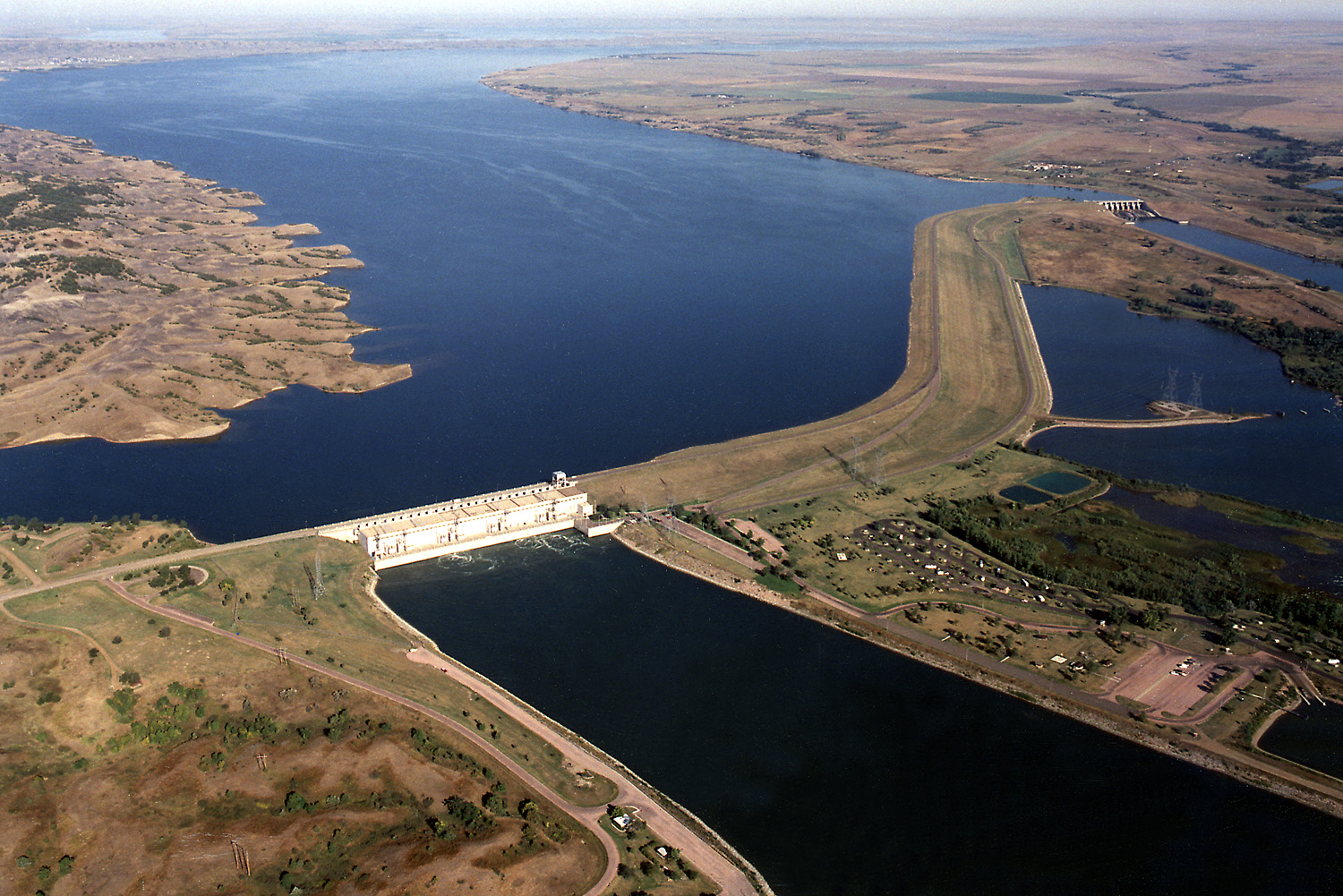
- Big Bend Dam on the Missouri River, with Lake Sharpe in the background.

- Location of Big Bend Dam in the State of South Dakota.
- Official name: Big Dam
- Country: United States
- Location: Buffalo/Lyman Counties, South Dakota.
- Coordinates: 44.049473°N 99.448586°W
- Status: Operational
- Construction began: 1959; 67 years ago
- Opening date: 1963; 63 years ago
- Construction cost: $107 million
- Owners: U.S. Army Corps of Engineers, Omaha District

Dam and spillways
- Type of dam: Embankment, Rolled-earth shale fill & chalk fill
- Impounds: Missouri River
- Height: 95 ft (29 m)
- Length: 10,570 ft (3,222 m) (including spillway)
- Elevation at crest: 1,423 feet msl
- Width (base): 1,200 ft (366 m)
- Dam volume: 17,000,000 cu yd (12,997,433 m^{3})
- Spillways: 8 - 40-foot x 38-foot tainter gates
- Spillway type: controlled (gated)
- Spillway capacity: 270,000 cfs at 1,423 feet msl

Reservoir
- Creates: Lake Sharpe
- Total capacity: 1,798,000 acre⋅ft (2.217800344×10^{9} m^{3})
- Catchment area: 5,840 sq mi (15,126 km^{2})
- Surface area: 56,884 acres (23,020 ha)
- Maximum length: 80 mi (129 km)
- Maximum water depth: 78 ft (24 m)
- Normal elevation: 1,420-1,423 feet msl

Power Station
- Operator: U.S. Army Corps of Engineers
- Commission date: October 1964
- Turbines: 8 Fixed blade, 81.8 rpm
- Installed capacity: 494,320 kW
- Annual generation: 969 million kilowatt hours
- Website; U.S. Army Corps of Engineers - Big Bend Dam / Lake Sharpe

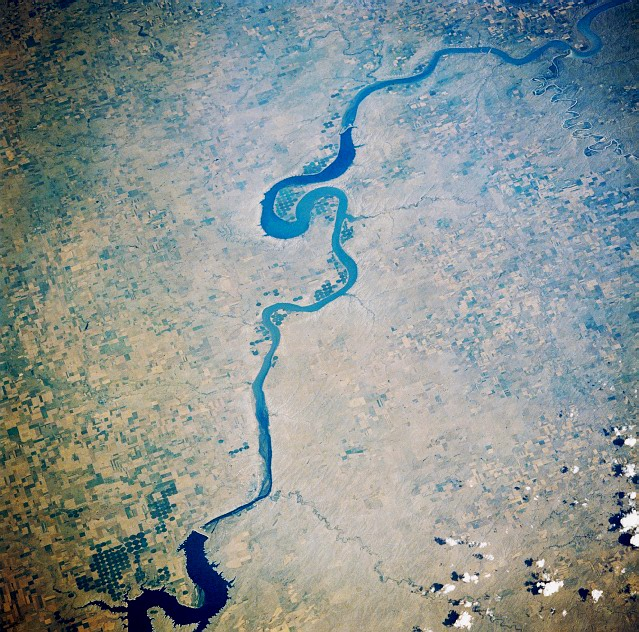
Lake Sharpe with visible Big Bend Dam from space, August 1989. View is to the east-southeast.

Big Bend Dam is a major embankment rolled-earth dam on the Missouri River in Central South Dakota, United States, creating Lake Sharpe. The dam was constructed by the U.S. Army Corps of Engineers as part of the Pick-Sloan Plan for Missouri watershed development authorized by the Flood Control Act of 1944. Construction began in 1959 and the embankment was completed in July 1963. Power generation began at the facility in 1964 and the entire complex was completed in 1966 at a total cost of $107 million. The hydroelectric plant generates 493,300 kilowatts of electricity at maximum capacity, with an annual production of 969 million kilowatt hours, and meets peak-hour demand for power within the Missouri River Basin.

Located near Fort Thompson, South Dakota, just south of the Big Bend of the Missouri River, a large meander, Big Bend Dam creates Lake Sharpe, named after South Dakota Governor Merrill Q. Sharpe. The lake extends for 80 miles (130 km) up the course of the Missouri River passing through Pierre, the State Capitol, to Oahe Dam, another major power-generating and flood control dam. Lake Sharpe covers a total of 56,884 acres (23,020 ha) and drains an area just under 250,000 square miles (650,000 km^{2}).

South Dakota Highway 47 crosses over the dam, connecting Lyman and Buffalo Counties. Big Bend Dam is located approximately 17 miles (27 km) north of I-90, and approximately 60 miles (97 km) southeast of Pierre.

The next dam upstream is Oahe Dam, near Pierre, and the next dam downstream is Fort Randall Dam, near Pickstown.

== Native American tribes ==
The construction of the dam resulted in the dislocation of people on the Crow Creek and Lower Brule Reservations. The flooding of the land for the reservoir also resulted in the loss of limited plant life resources used by them for food and medicine.

A monument at Big Bend Dam dedicated in 2002, the Spirit of the Circle Monument, honors the more than 1,300 people who died over a three-year period in the 1860s at the Crow Creek Reservation near the present site of the dam.

== 2011 Missouri River flood ==
For the first time in the dam's history, the US Army Corps of Engineers opened the dam's spillway gates on the morning of June 3, 2011. In response to the 2011 Missouri River Floods, the dam was releasing 150,000 cubic feet per second (4,200 m^{3}/s), which greatly exceeded its previous record release of 74,000 cu ft/s (2,100 m^{3}/s) set in 1997.

== See also ==
- Lake Sharpe
- Pick-Sloan Plan
- U.S. Army Corps of Engineers
- Crow Creek Indian Reservation
- Lower Brule Indian Reservation
