= William Glenn Sloan =

American civil engineer (1888–1987)

William Glenn Sloan (August 21, 1888 – August 13, 1987) was an American inventor and scientist who was co-author of the Pick-Sloan Missouri Basin Program to dam the upper Missouri River.

Sloan was born in Paris, Illinois. His father, a Presbyterian minister, moved to Helena, Montana in 1910. He graduated from Montana State College with a Bachelor of Science degree in civil engineering in 1910.

Sloan joined the United States Department of Agriculture and became a drainage engineer in Idaho in 1910. During World War I he was a lieutenant in the U.S. Army Corps of Engineers.

After the war, he was a private consultant on irrigation engineering projects until 1936, when he joined the United States Bureau of Reclamation, first in the Rio Grande Valley.

In 1943 he was named Regional Director of the Billings, Montana Reclamation office when he proposed using water from proposed dams on the Missouri River for 3,700,000 acres (15,000 km^{2}) of irrigation.

Sloan's proposal was to be carried out in conjunction with a United States Army Corps of Engineers plan proposed by Lewis A. Pick to build dams on the Missouri to alleviate flooding and improve navigation (known as the "Pick Plan").

The two plans, which became known as the Pick-Sloan Missouri Basin Program, were initially enacted in the Flood Control Act of 1944. The project resulted in a series of dams on the Upper Missouri and its tributaries in Montana, North Dakota, South Dakota, and Nebraska, which among other things generate 2.5 million kilowatts of electricity.

Among Sloan's other accomplishments is a patent on the airlift pump.
