= Davis Creek Dam =

- Location within Nebraska Location within the United States
- Country: United States
- Location: Nebraska
- Coordinates: 41°24′57″N 98°44′57″W
- Status: Operational
- Opening date: 1991
- Designed by: United States Bureau of Reclamation
- Operator: Twin Loups Irrigation District

Dam and spillways
- Impounds: Davis Creek
- Height: 153 ft (47 m)
- Length: 2,900 ft (880 m)
- Elevation at crest: 2,094 ft (638 m)

Reservoir
- Creates: Davis Creek Reservoir
- Total capacity: 44,918 acre⋅ft (55,406,000 m^{3})
- Catchment area: 6.32 sq mi (16.4 km^{2})
- Surface area: 1,145 acres (463 ha)
- Normal elevation: 2,064 ft (629 m)

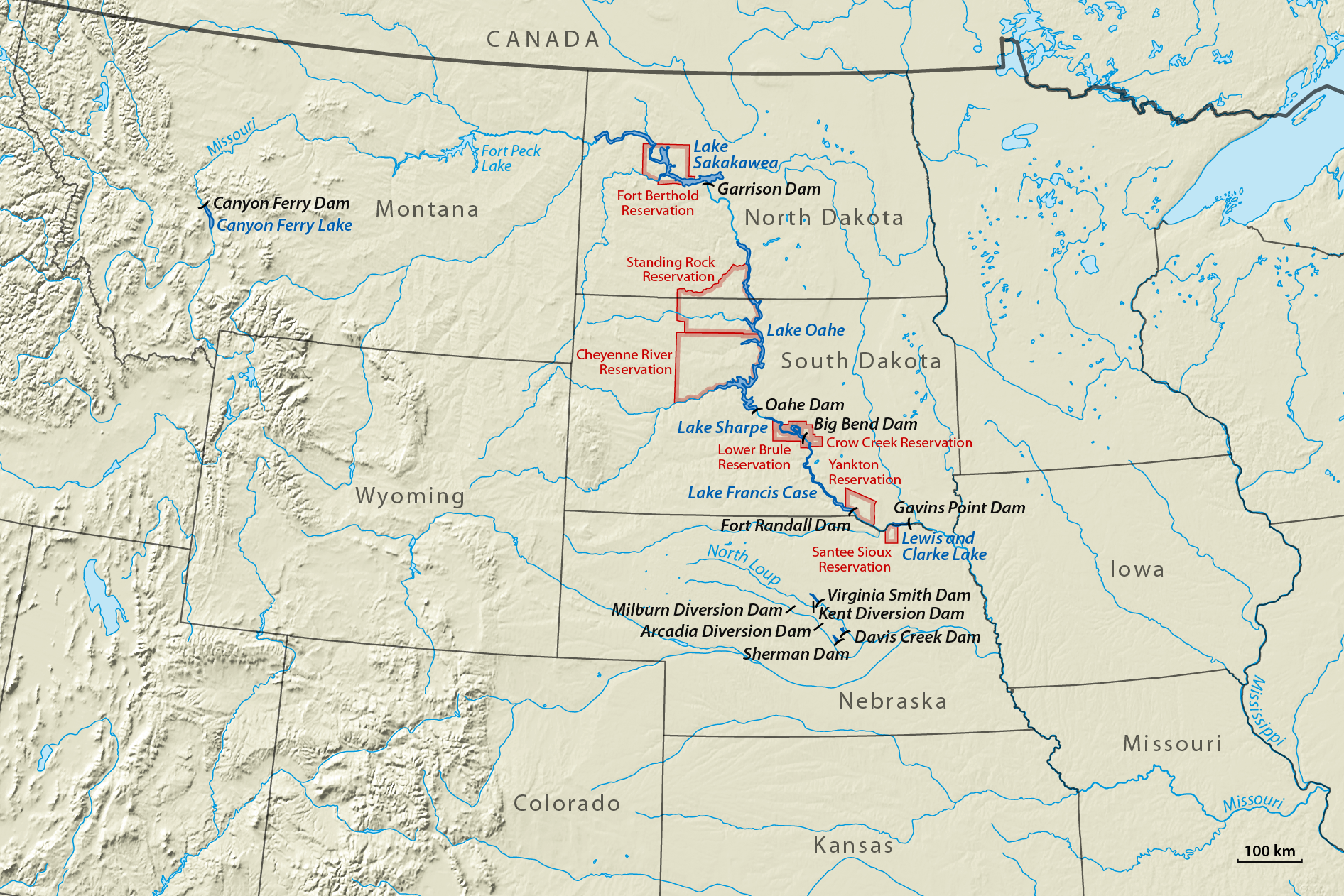
Location of Davis Creek Dam in Nebraska. The map shows dams and reservoirs built in the Pick–Sloan Program since the 1940s

Davis Creek Dam (National ID # NE82901) is a dam located at the county line between Greeley County and Valley County, in the middle part of the state of Nebraska.

The earthen dam was completed in 1991 by the United States Bureau of Reclamation with a height of 153 feet (47 m) and 2,900 feet (880 m) long at its crest. It impounds Davis Creek for flood control, part of the North Loup Division of the Bureau's extensive Pick-Sloan Missouri Basin Program. The dam is owned by the Bureau and is operated by the local Twin Loups Irrigation District.

The reservoir it creates, Davis Creek Reservoir, has a water surface of 1,145 acres (463 ha) and has a capacity of 44,918 acre-feet (55,406,000 m^{3}). Recreation includes fishing (for largemouth bass, walleye, crappie, yellow perch, etc.), hunting, boating, camping and hiking. The northern shore borders the Davis Creek State Wildlife Recreational Area.
