= Iron Nation =

Leader of the Lower Brulé Lakota

Solomon Iron Nation
- Ma'-Zu-Oya'-Te
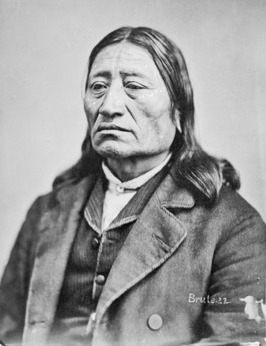
- Chief Iron Nation

Brulé, Lakota leader

Personal details
- Born: February 1815
- Died: November 15, 1894 Lower Brule Indian Reservation, South Dakota
- Cause of death: Pneumonia
- Resting place: Messiah Episcopal Church Cemetery, Lower Brule Indian Reservation, South Dakota

Solomon Iron Nation (Lakota: Ma'-Zu-Oya'-Te; February 1815 – November 15, 1894), often just referred to as Iron Nation, was a principal chief—and the last Head Chief—of the Lower Brule Lakota. He signed multiple treaties with the United States government, including the Fort Laramie Treaties of 1851 and 1868. His leadership oversaw the creation of the Lower Brule Indian Reservation.

== Early life ==
Very little is known about Iron Nation's early life. He was born in February 1815 in what is now South Dakota, somewhere west of the Missouri River. Until about 1840, only intermittent contact was made between his tribe and the white settlers, who usually appeared in the form of fur traders. At this time, the Sioux dominated this area of the Great Plains.

== Chief of the Lower Brule ==
=== Fort Laramie and Fort Sully Treaties ===
By the 1850s, however, tensions between Native Americans and the increasingly-present pioneers were growing, and conflicts began to break out. Iron Nation was one of the signers of the September 17, 1851, Treaty of Fort Laramie, along with people from Lakota, Cheyenne, Arapaho, and other tribes. This allowed settlers to pass through tribal territory for an annuity. When exactly Iron Nation became chief is unknown, but it is believed to be by 1860.

Iron Nation also signed the October 14, 1865, Fort Sully Treaty with other Lakota chiefs, which established the Lower Brule Indian Reservation. A state historic marker near the Lower Brule Agency reads:

On October 14, 1865, at Fort Sully (5 miles E of Pierre) the Lower Brule Band by Iron Nation, White Buffalo Cow, Little Pheasant and 12 others, signed a treaty. It differed from the others signed there in that it set up a reservation 20 miles long and 10 back from the river between White River and Fort Lookout. The 1,800 Lower Brules were to get $6,000 a year and families who went to farming were to get $25.00 bonus. In 1866, they planted some acreage and to their great surprise got 2,000 bushels of grain.

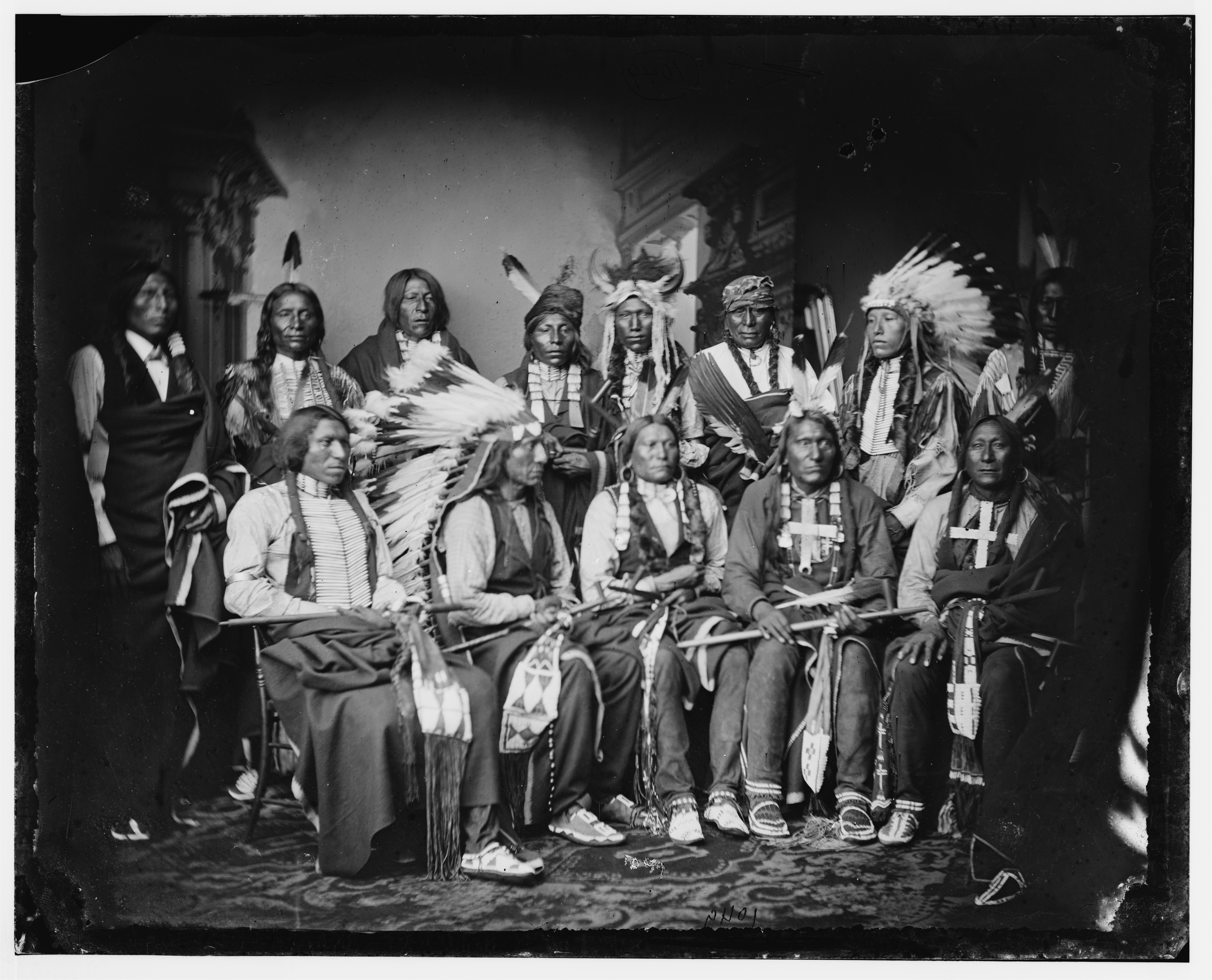
Chief Iron Nation (far right, standing) with other Lakota leaders

Three years later, he signed the 1868 Treaty of Fort Laramie, which eliminated U.S. forts along the Bozeman Trail in Montana and established the Great Sioux Reservation, permanently locating the Lower Brule tribe along the Missouri River in modern-day south-central South Dakota. Iron Nation ultimately hoped this would allow his tribe to avoid involvement in the Sioux Wars, and he settled into a homestead on the reservation.

Chief Iron Nation also signed the Black Hills agreement in September 1876. U.S. government agents went to the various Indian agencies to obtain signatures signing away Lakota rights to the Black Hills, which the Lakota consider sacred. The Black Hills had been guaranteed to the Lakota by the 1868 treaty signed at Fort Laramie, but this was before gold was found, which resulted in the Black Hills Gold Rush.

In 1882, the tribe was approached by the Teller Commission, who intended to buy the reservation and move the Lower Brule onto a shared reservation with the Upper Brule band at Rosebud Indian Reservation. Iron Nation and other chiefs resisted their efforts, and they were ultimately successful at retaining their own land. Seven years later, in 1889, Iron Nation signed one last treaty, which divided the Great Sioux Reservation among the Sioux, creating the much-smaller Lower Brule Indian Reservation.

== Death and legacy ==
- Iron Nation's Gravesite
- U.S. National Register of Historic Places
- Location within South Dakota Location within the United States
- Location: Messiah Episcopal Church Cemetery, Lower Brule Indian Reservation, South Dakota
- Coordinates: 44.100731°N 99.737617°W
- Built: 1934
- NRHP reference No.: 14000032
- Added to NRHP: February 24, 2014

Chief Iron Nation died of pneumonia at his home on the reservation on November 15, 1894. This house, located in Oacoma, burned down about 2005. He was subsequently buried in his family plot at the nearby Messiah Episcopal Church Cemetery. An obelisk was dedicated at his gravesite by the tribe in 1934, which was listed on the National Register of Historic Places on February 24, 2014. This monument was the first known Christian-style funerary monument erected for a Sioux chief in South Dakota. The inscription reads:

We, the Lower Brule Indians
put up this stone in memory of our
dear Head Chief
Solomon Iron Nation
Who died November 14, 1894,
Aged 79 years.
Children, Love one another.

The South Dakota Department of Tribal Government Relations website notes, "He has been described as a just and noble leader." He was inducted into the South Dakota Hall of Fame in 2006.

An 1867 photograph of Iron Nation by Alexander Gardner is held in the collections of the Princeton University Library.

Two members of the Lower Brule Sioux Tribe produced a 12-minute animated film about Iron Nation in 1997.
