= Lower Brule Indian Reservation =

Indian reservation in South Dakota, United States

Lower Brule Indian Reservation Khulwíčhaša Oyáte (Lakota)
- Reservation
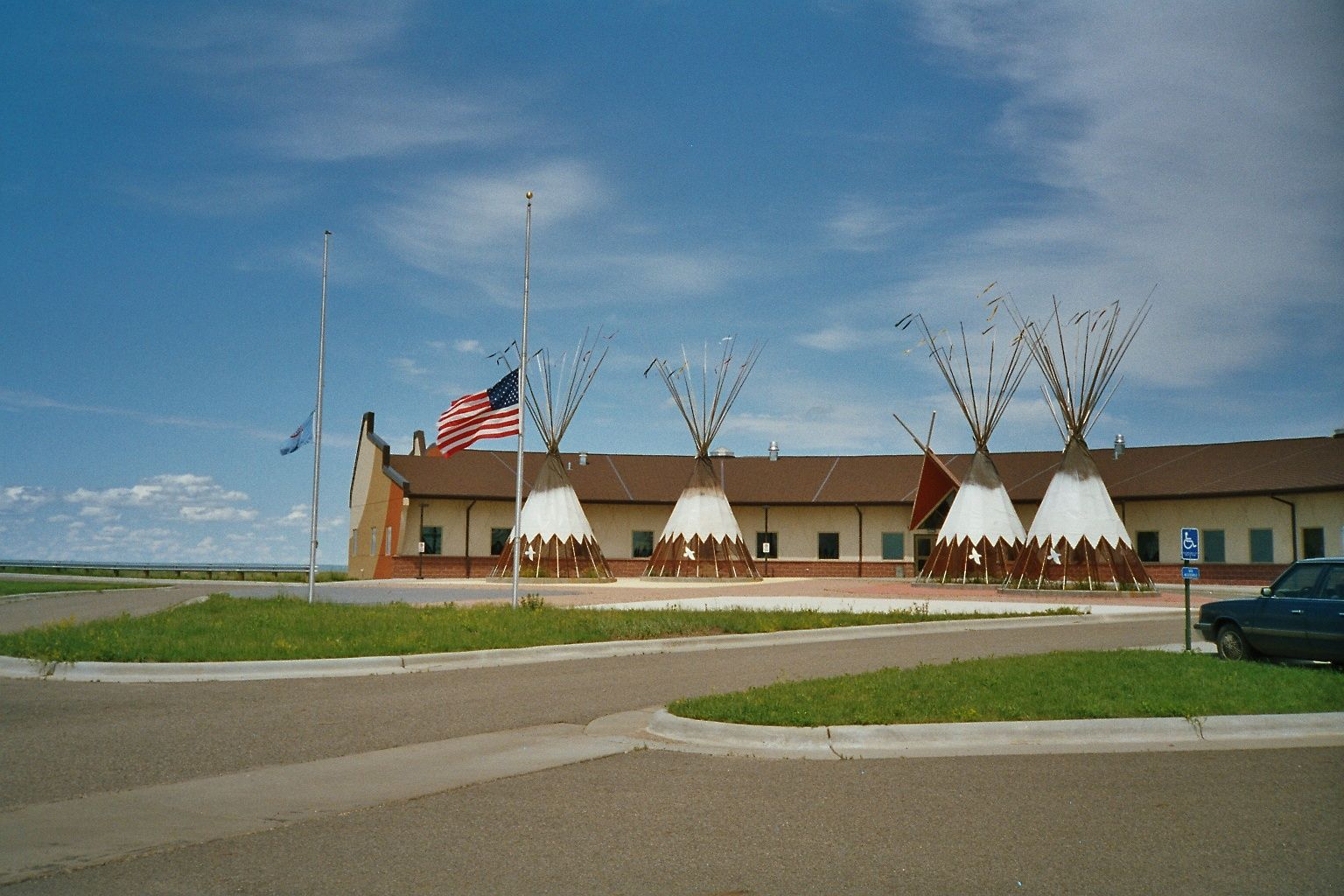
- Administration Center, Lower Brule Indian Reservation

- Location of Lower Brule Indian Reservation, South Dakota
- Coordinates: 44.08°N 99.78°W
- Country: United States
- State: South Dakota
- Counties: Lyman / Stanley

Government
  - Type: Tribal Council
  - Chairman: Boyd Gourneau

Area
  - Total: 207.189 sq mi (536.617 km^{2})

Population (2020)
  - Total: 1,630
- Time zone: UTC-6 (CST)
  - Summer (DST): UTC-6 (CDT)
- Website: Lower Brule Sioux Tribe Official Website

The Lower Brule Indian Reservation (Khulwíčhaša Oyáte, 'lower people nation') is an Indian reservation that belongs to the Lower Brule Sioux Tribe. It is located on the west bank of the Missouri River in Lyman and Stanley counties in central South Dakota in the United States. The Crow Creek Indian Reservation is on the east bank of the river. The Lower Brule Sioux are considered a band of the Sicangu, one of the tribes of the Lakota people, though a separate group. Tribal headquarters is in Lower Brule.

== History ==
The Sioux consist of a group of self-governing tribes speaking one of three Siouan languages: Eastern Dakota, Western Dakota and Lakota. The Eastern Dakota or Santee, who use the autonyms Mdewakantonwan, Wahpetowan, Wahpekute, or Sisseton, range in territory from the Ohio River valley to South Dakota. The Western Dakota, known as the Ihanktonwan/Yankton or Yanktonai/Ihanktonwanna, range from eastern Minnesota to the Missouri River valley. The Lakota, or Western Teton/Tituwan Sioux, consisting of the Oglala, Miniconjou, Sicangu, Sihasapa, Two Kettles, Hunkpapa, and Itazipco, traditionally ranged from lands east of the Missouri River valley to the Rocky Mountains. A common history and language, a strong respect for the land and nature, the common use of pipestone and the reverence held for the stone, and ceremonies such as the Sun Dance, sweat lodges, and vision quests, bind these peoples together.

The name "Brule" comes from the French word brûlé (burnt), the name French fur traders used for the Sicangu in the late 17th century. The Sicangu divided into the Lower Brule and the Heyata Wicasa, or Upper Brule, in the late 18th century. The Lower Brule favored lands at the confluence of the White River and the Missouri River, while the Upper Brule lived further south and west.

The tribe has been working to improve the environment of the reservation and to protect its sacred places. In 2013, the tribe requested that the KELO-TV station find a new site for a transmission tower on Medicine Butte that had fallen. Medicine Butte rises about 200 feet (61 m) above the prairie and is sacred to the Sicangu. The town of Reliance developed nearby. KELO-TV agreed to the tribe's request and placed a new tower elsewhere.

== Employment ==
Major employers are the Lower Brule Sioux Tribe, its Golden Buffalo Casino, Bureau of Indian Affairs, and Indian Health Service. The gaming casino has generated new revenue for the tribe.

== Government ==
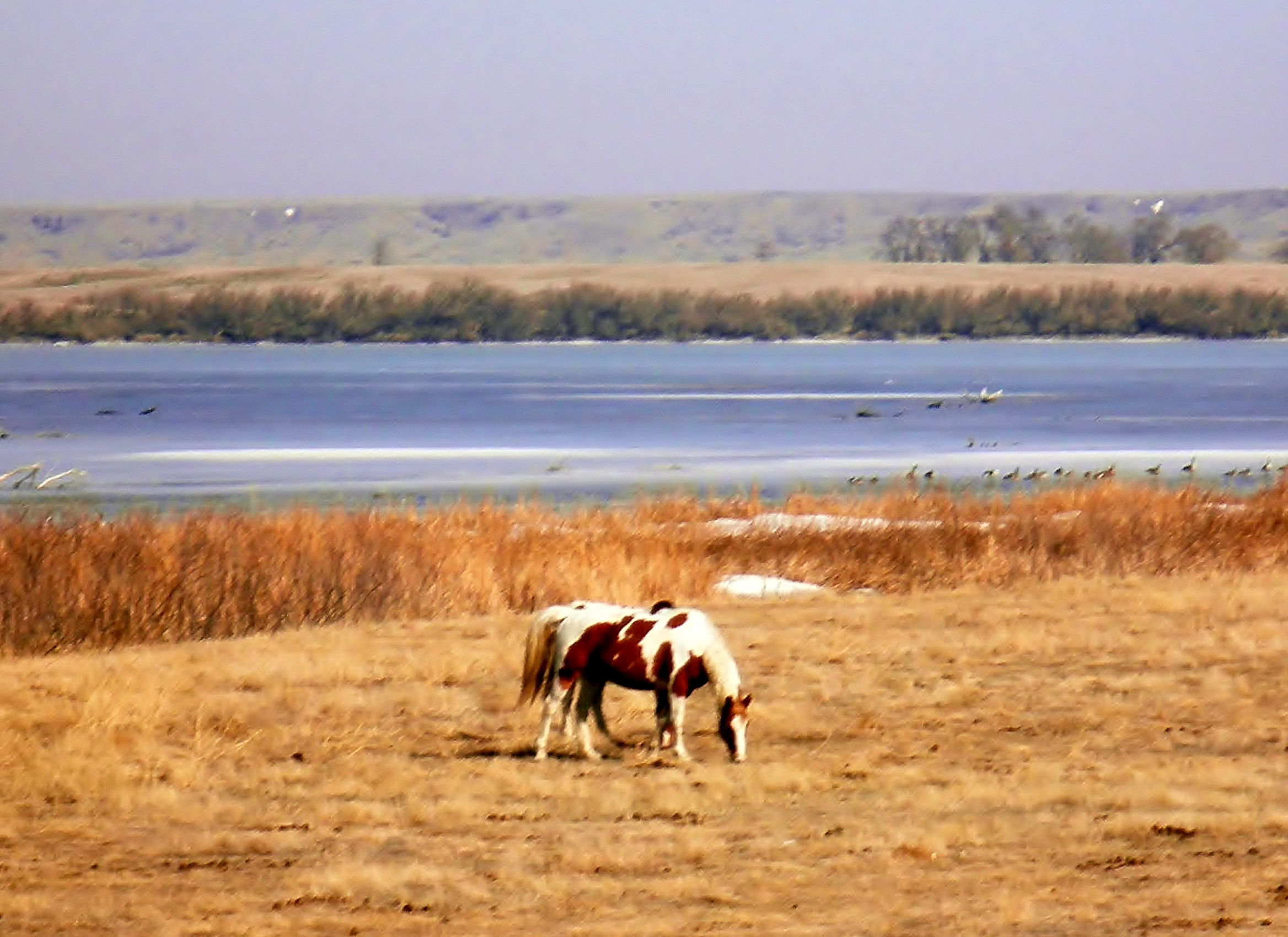
Two "painted horses" grazing near the Missouri River on the Lower Brule Indian Reservation

The Lower Brule Sioux Tribe is a sovereign nation defined by its government-to-government relationship with the United States. As part of the Great Sioux Nation, the tribe signed treaties in 1824, 1851, 1865 and 1868 with the federal government that constitute the legal documents establishing boundaries and recognizing the rights of sovereign tribal governments.

The Tribe was chartered under the Indian Reorganization Act of June 18, 1934. Its constitution was ratified on July 11, 1936, and bylaws were approved in 1960. The tribe has contracted several aspects of self-government under the 1975 Indian Self Determination and Education Assistance Act, PL 93-638. On June 17, 1974, the constitution and bylaws were amended, and on September 2, 1986, they were again amended and a code of ethics adopted.

Tribal affairs are conducted by a six-member tribal council who are elected to serve two-year terms. Council offices include the chairman, vice-chairman, secretary/treasurer, and three council members. The tribal council chairman serves as the chief executive officer and administrative head of the tribe.

=== Elections ===
A general election is held on the first Tuesday of September in even-numbered years. Chairman, vice-chairman, and secretary and treasurer are elected at-large. The tribal council appoints a sergeant at arms, a chaplain, and other officers as necessary. Offices are held for two years. Elections consist of a primary and general election. The primaries are held in August and the general is held in September, with officials being seated during the October regular meeting. Council members also serve as officers or council representatives on various boards and committees.

=== Council meetings ===
Meetings are held the first Wednesday of each month with a quorum of five members.

== Courts ==
The Lower Brule Sioux Tribal courts are established under a quasi-separation of power relationship with the tribal government. The 1986 constitution/by-law amendments created the chief judge as an elected position with a 4-year term. While the tribal council is the final authority on the reservation, it has formally acknowledged the legal authority necessarily vested in the tribal courts.

The Lower Brule Sioux Court system also has established an appellate court and attendant processes. The court hears all civil and minor criminal cases, while the federal courts hear all major felony cases.

== Infrastructure ==
As part of the Pick-Sloan Missouri River Basin program, authorized by Congress in 1944 for flood control, two major dams and other flood control projects were built in this area by the federal government. It acquired property on the Lower Brule Indian Reservation for two dam projects: 7,997 acres of Indian land for the Fort Randall Dam project and 14,299 acres for the Big Bend Dam project.

In 1963, the Big Bend Dam on the Missouri River was completed by the Army Corps of Engineers. The operation of the dam caused flooding of the Lower Brule community and surrounding bottomlands in the heart of the reservation. The waters inundated miles of roadways and a significant amount of the most productive and fertile farmland of the Reservation; it destroyed most of the Reservation’s native trees, shrubs and medicinal plants, which were located chiefly along the river bottomlands. By Public Law 87-734 (76 Stat. 698 et seq.), the Secretary of the Army was to provide mitigation for such damages, including replacing roads and facilities. The government failed to carry out its obligations under the act.

In 1997 the federal government enacted the Lower Brule Infrastructure Development Trust Fund Act in compensation for the lands and infrastructure lost due to construction of the Big Bend Dam and flooding of the reservoir. The act was also intended to enable the tribe to share in the benefits of these projects. It provided for payments to the tribe of amounts beginning in 1998 and annually until the aggregated of $39.3 million had been accumulated in the trust fund.

In response, the tribe created a plan for how it would use such funds for facilities and development to aid the tribe. It also established the Infrastructure Development Authority, a committee of tribal members who oversee the trust fund, and recommend action and expenditures to the tribal council. Since establishment of the trust fund, the authority has supervised development of the administration building and community center located in Lower Brule. The authority is also overseeing construction of the Lower Brule Justice Center.

The tribe has established the Buffalo Interpretive Center, providing insight into the people and their customs but has since been abandoned due to lack of funding and interest.

Local telephone service is furnished by the Golden West Telephone Company, as well as various cell phone providers. Internet services are available through Golden West and the West Central Rural Electric Cooperative. The Lower Brule Sioux Tribe is a member of the West Central Rural Electric Cooperative. The majority of tribal members are also Cooperative members, as it is the major electricity provider in west central South Dakota.

The reservation has approximately 200 miles (320 km) of roads. These include 107 miles (172 km) of gravel roads, 65 miles (105 km) of asphalt, 11 miles (18 km) of graded dirt roads, and 10 miles (16 km) of unimproved roads.

The Tribe operates a propane company and serves all residences within the reservation, as well as areas adjacent to the reservation. Unleaded gasoline, E-10, and diesel” are available at the local Buche’s Gus Stop. Fuel oil is available from the nearest Fanners Union in Reliance (15 miles (24 km)). Lake Sharpe serves as a virtually unlimited water source for the Lower Brule community. The Lower Brule Sioux Tribe's Rural Water System (RWSS) supplies clean water to the communities of Lower Brule and West Brule for both domestic and agricultural use. This system is a part of the Mni Wiconi Water Project, authorized to provide water for the Pine Ridge Reservation, Rosebud Reservation, Lower Brule Reservation and counties located in west-central South Dakota.

The Lower Brule Sioux Tribe, in coordination with the Indian Health Service, operates a solid waste collection and transfer facility. The Solid Waste Program gathers all solid waste from receptacles located throughout the reservation. All solid waste is disposed in approved landfill facilities in Pierre and Pukwana. The Lower Brule Sioux Tribe, in coordination with the Indian Health Service, operates a sewage disposal and treatment system for the towns of Lower Brule and West Brule. The major treatment for wastewater is evaporation and settling in evaporation and settling ponds in two lagoon areas; the system uses limited aeration.

== Housing ==
There are 392 residences on the reservation, 300 of them constructed with U.S. Department of Housing and Urban Development funds. The Lower Brule Housing Authority manages 228 of the homes. Only 36.8 percent of the units on the reservation are owner-occupied, compared to a state average of 68.2 percent. The housing market is very tight on the reservation, with the majority of housing intended for low-income residents. The tribe is planning to develop additional market-rate housing to meet the needs of tribal residents who do not satisfy the low-income requirements.

== Other services ==
Lower Brule has an elderly center that provides an elderly nutrition program and other activities and a teen center that sponsors youth recreational activities. The tribe’s $5.8 million Veteran's Memorial Community Center has a swimming pool, full-size basketball court, weight and exercise rooms and a large kitchen.

The tribe contracts with Indian Health Services to operate a Tribal Health Department that oversees the tribal ambulance services and employs Community Health Representatives. The Tribal Health Department provides examinations and eyeglasses to tribal members at reduced costs, as well as coordinating health delivery services. The Lower Brule IHS Service Unit operates a medical clinic and conducts several outreach programs, which provide services to the members of the Lower Brule Sioux Tribe on a regular basis, and to anyone in an emergency. Full-service hospital facilities are available in the neighboring communities of Chamberlain and Pierre.

== Recreation ==
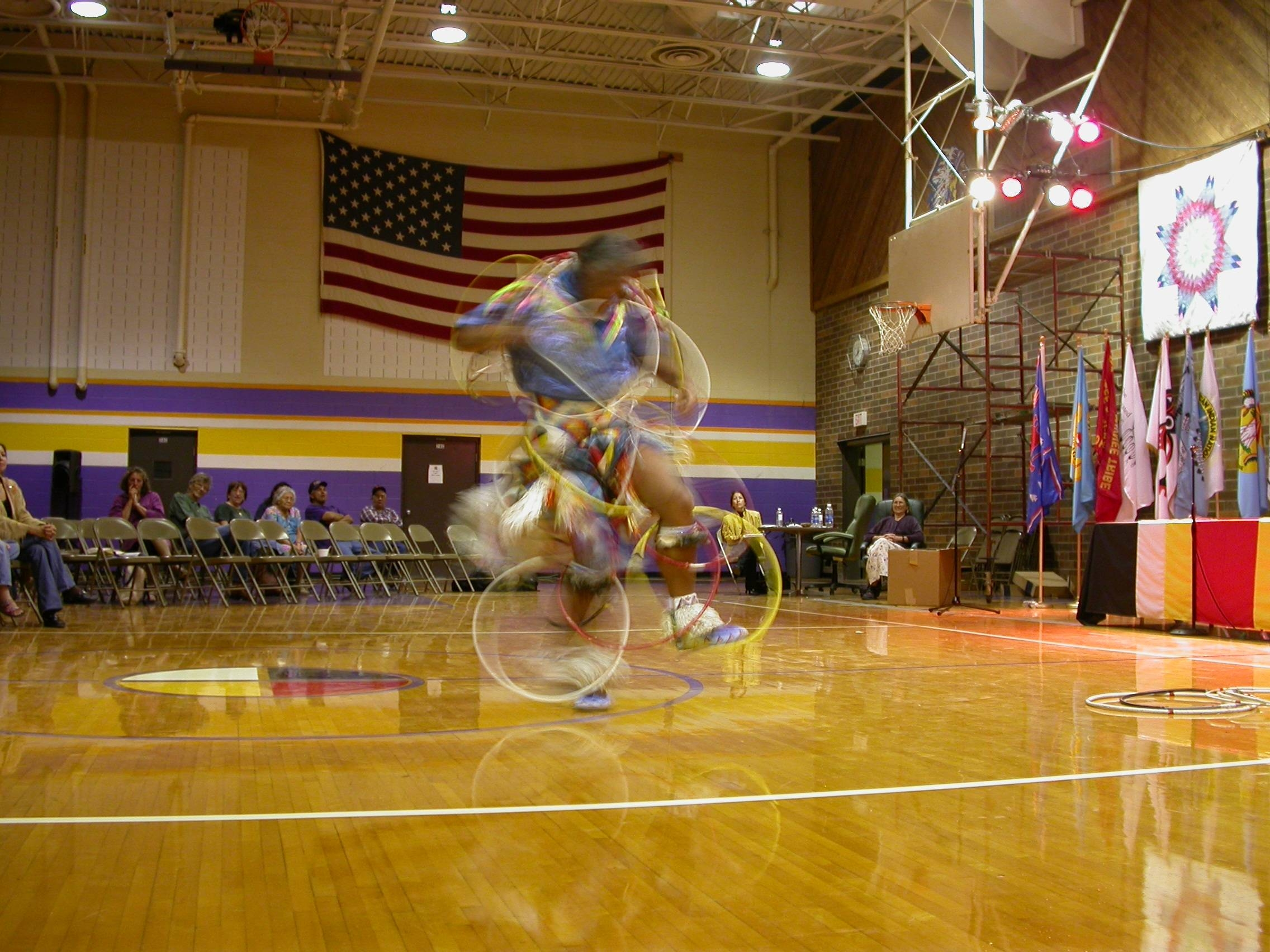
Hoop dance

The Golden Buffalo Casino operates a convention center with a capacity of 120 people. A horseman's club sponsors several "Play Days" throughout the summer. The tribe has a recreational area and boat launch at South Iron Nation and other informal beach areas, and boat ramps along the shoreline of the Missouri River.

== Transportation ==
Commercial airline and freight train services are available in Pierre. The town of Chamberlain provides the nearest landing strip and bus service. Truck service is available locally, and most retail businesses on the reservation receive service from suppliers in distributor-owned trucks. Greyhound Lines terminals are located in Chamberlain and Pierre. River City Transit runs a daily bus/van transportation service between Lower Brule and Pierre.

== Education ==
The Lower Brule education system consists of a Head Start program, a K-5 elementary school, a 6-8 middle school, and a 9-12 high school. The tribe also operates the Lower Brule Community College, accredited under Sinte Gleska University of the Rosebud Sioux Tribe. In addition, the tribe is involved in a video-cultural program in which students, teachers and elders document important cultural activities and histories.

== Notable tribal members ==
- Chief Iron Nation (1815–1894) led the Lower Brule Sioux Tribe through some of its most challenging years. He worked both as a warrior and statesman to ensure the survival of his people. Iron Nation signed the treaty to establish the Great Sioux Reservation in 1868.
- Michael Jandreau (1943–2015) helped lead the Lower Brule Sioux Tribe during difficult years of transition immediately prior to, and 40 continuous years after, the passage of the Indian Self-Determination and Education Assistance Act of 1975. Jandreau was elected to the Lower Brule Sioux Tribal Council an unprecedented 22 consecutive two-year terms. He served as chairman for 18 terms; his final term was only six months as he died while in office.

== Representation in other media ==
Jim Miller, a spiritual leader and Vietnam War veteran, organized a group ride by horseback in 2012 following a vivid dream. They traveled from South Brule to Mankato, Minnesota, reaching it by December 26, the 150th anniversary of the largest mass execution in United States history. After bands surrendered at the end of the Dakota War of 1862, warriors were tried by a US military tribunal. Thirty-nine Dakota warriors were sentenced to be executed by hanging, and one was spared. More than 250 men were held several years as prisoners. The group from South Brule made their ride to encourage healing and reconciliation, both within their group, and for the people they encountered. A documentary film, Dakota 38, was made of their journey, and they are distributing it for free, as part of the healing.
