= Crow Creek Indian Reservation =

Indian reservation in South Dakota, United States

Coordinates: 44°07′44″N 99°28′26″W

Crow Creek Indian Reservation Khąǧí Wakpá Okášpe (Dakota) Kȟaŋğí Wakpá Oyáŋke (Lakota)
- Reservation
- Location of Crow Creek Indian Reservation, South Dakota
- Country: United States
- State: South Dakota
- Counties: Buffalo / Hughes / Hyde

Government
  - Governing body: Crow Creek Sioux Tribal Council

Area
  - Total: 196.236 sq mi (508.248 km^{2})

Population (2004)
  - Total: 1,230
- Time zone: UTC-6 (CST)
  - Summer (DST): UTC-5 (CDT)
- Website: hunkpatioyate.org

The Crow Creek Indian Reservation (Dakota: Khąǧí wakpá okášpe, Lakota: Kȟaŋğí Wakpá Oyáŋke), home to Crow Creek Sioux Tribe (Dakota: Khąǧí wakpá oyáte or Húŋkpathi Oyáte) is located in parts of Buffalo, Hughes, and Hyde counties on the east bank of the Missouri River in central South Dakota in the United States. It has a land area of 421.658 square miles (1,092.09 km^{2}) and a 2000 census population of 2,225 persons. The major town and capital of the federally recognized Crow Creek Sioux Tribe is Fort Thompson.

The town is located adjacent to the Big Bend Dam, which holds back Big Bend Reservoir (also known as Lake Sharpe), one of the four Missouri Mainstem reservoirs constructed by the US Army Corps of Engineers in the Pick-Sloan Plan. Authorized in 1944 for flood control and hydropower, the dam and lake were completed in the 1960s.

== History ==
The people of the Crow Creek Sioux Tribe are mostly descendants of the Mdewakanton of south and central present-day Minnesota. They were expelled from Minnesota, along with the Santee Dakota and Ho-Chunk after all reservations in the southern part of that state were abolished in December 1862 following the Dakota War.

The land was poorly suited for people accustomed to their former woodland terrain, as it was dry and lacked game for hunting. For six weeks after their arrival at Crow Creek, three or four expelled people died every day from starvation or disease. This caused the Santee and Ho-Chunk to flee the reservation downriver, the Santee settling at what is now the Santee Sioux Reservation in north-central Nebraska and the Ho-Chunk settling on part of the Omaha Reservation in northeast Nebraska, later purchasing that part from the Omaha.

Some Yankton and lower Yanktonai Dakota also reside on the reservation. Although some writers consider this to have been part of the Great Sioux Reservation, which was established west of the Missouri River, the Crow Creek Reservation, founded in 1862, has always been separate.

The reservation originally included bottomlands along the Missouri, which had been farmed previously by Mandan and Arikara, and other indigenous peoples prior to these tribes. These peoples were decimated in smallpox and other infectious disease epidemics in the 18th century. Surviving Mandan, Hidatsa and Arikara moved northwest and formed the Affiliated Tribes, whose descendants have occupied the Fort Berthold Indian Reservation in North Dakota. Today several former Mandan and Arikara villages within the Crow Creek Reservation are preserved as archaeological sites.

=== Earlier cultures ===
Within the reservation are two pre-contact archeological sites that have been designated as National Historic Landmarks. Fort Thompson Mounds is an archeological site consisting of six miles of burial mounds along the river, constructed from c. 800 CE. They have yielded evidence of some of the first pottery makers on the plains. During salvage excavation of one site, some older materials were radiocarbon dated to c. 2450 BCE, showing nearly 5,000 years of indigenous settlement.

The Crow Creek Massacre Site has revealed evidence of fierce conflict between Native American cultures about 1325 CE, likely when they were competing for resources at a time of climate and habitat change. They are believed to have been Siouan-speaking and Caddoan-speaking indigenous peoples who were ancestral to known historic tribes.

=== 20th century to present ===
The 20th-century development of Lake Sharpe following completion of the Big Bend Dam flooded much of this bottomland. It also forced relocation of Fort Thompson and other settlements. Loss of the most productive, fertile bottomlands worsened the economic conditions for the Mdewakanton and other Native Americans. Allotment and land sales since the late nineteenth century had reduced the amount of land in both tribal and Indian ownership, and the size of the Reservation was reduced by governmental action between its establishment in 1862 and modern times.

The reservation and the Crow Creek Sioux Tribe is organized into three districts. The tribe runs its own school, the Crow Creek Tribal Schools system, with an elementary school at Fort Thompson and a K-12 boarding and day school at Stephan, approximately 10 miles (16 km) north of Fort Thompson. The tribe leases most of its land for grazing to a few large ranching families, as it is not suitable for subsistence farming. Unemployment is high.

The tribe operates the Lode Star Casino and Hotel on its reservation, attracting tourists and area residents. The archeological sites are also featured for heritage tourism. Recreational travelers use Lake Sharpe's fishing and boating.

The Lower Brule Indian Reservation, originally part of the Great Sioux Reservation, is located on the west bank of the Missouri River. It is directly across from the Crow Creek Reservation. Its people also lost fertile bottomlands in the flooding that accompanied the construction of the dam.

== Monuments and commemorations of the Dakota War of 1862 and its aftermath ==
In 2002 a monument was dedicated at Big Bend Dam. The Spirit of the Circle Monument honors the more than 1,300 people who died of malnutrition and exposure over a three-year period in the 1860s at the reservation after the Santee Dakota had been expelled from Minnesota. Deaths in early years at Crow Creek included many members of the Ho-Chunk nation, who had also been forced to relocate to Crow Creek by an act of Congress—even though they were uninvolved in the Dakota War of 1862.

On May 10, 2013, about 150 years after Minnesota State Governor Alexander Ramsey had called for the extermination or removal of the Dakota people from Minnesota, his modern-day successor Mark Dayton observed a "day of reconciliation". He repudiated his predecessor's encouragement of vigilante violence against innocent people, and offered condolences to descendants who had lost ancestors in the Dakota War of 1862.

== Tribal information ==
- Reservation: Crow Creek Reservation; Buffalo, Hyde, and Hughes counties
- Division: Yanktonai, Santee
- Bands: Ihanktonwanna (Little end village dwellers), Mdewakanton (People of Spirit Lake)
- Land Area: 125,591 acres (508.25 km^{2})
- Tribal Headquarters: Fort Thompson, SD
- Time Zone: Central
- Traditional Language: Dakota
- Enrolled members living on reservation: 1,230
- Major industry: Agriculture

== Government ==
- Charter: None;
- Constitution and bylaws: Yes
- Date approved: April 26, 1949
- Name of governing body: Crow Creek Sioux Tribal Council
- Number of members: Six council members
- Dates of constitutional amendments: February 25, 1963, June 23, 1980, February 4, 1986
- Number of executive officers: One chairman

== Elections ==
- Election of all six council members and the chair are held every two years on the third Tuesday in April. The chairman is elected at-large by all districts. Council members are elected two each from three districts. The Tribal Council elects from within a vice-chairman, Treasurer and Secretary.

== Council meetings ==
- Regular meetings are held once a month.
- Quorum number: 4 members

== Notable tribal members ==
- Oscar Howe (1915–1983), Yanktonai, modernist painter. Howe was born and grew up on the Crow Creek Reservation. He received many honors, including being chosen as Artist Laureate of South Dakota. More than 20 Oscar Howe originals are on display at the Oscar Howe Art Center in Mitchell, South Dakota. One of his works was adapted as a tapestry that hangs behind the altar at the chapel at St. Joseph's Indian School in Chamberlain, South Dakota.
- Elizabeth Cook-Lynn taught Native American Studies for twenty years before becoming a full-time writer. She has written two novels and a collection of short stories. She edits the Wicazo Sa (Red Pencil) Review, an international Native American studies journal. She is also a traditional dancer on the powwow circuit. Cook-Lynn grew up on the Crow Creek Reservation.
- Shawn Hawk, world-rated professional boxer, has some roots at Crow Creek.
- Vernon Ashley was the oldest member of the Crow Creek Sioux Tribe at his death at age 99 in November 2015; he had been inducted into the South Dakota Hall of Fame in 1991. He had extensive knowledge of Native American laws and treaties, as well as the Dakota Sioux language. Ashley helped in developing the 1948 constitution and by-laws (red book), which the Crow Creek Sioux Tribe has used since it established elected government. In his state position, he worked on leadership and training for tribal councils.

== See also ==
- Crow Creek massacre
