= Flood Control Act of 1944 =

United States federal law

- Long title: An Act authorizing the construction of certain public works on rivers and harbors for flood control, and for other purposes.
- Nicknames: Pick-Sloan Flood Control Act of 1944
- Enacted by: the 78th United States Congress
- Effective: December 22, 1944

Citations
- Public law: Pub. L. 78–534
- Statutes at Large: 58 Stat. 887, Chap. 665

Legislative history
- Introduced in the House as H.R. 4485 by William Madison Whittington (D–MS) on March 27, 1944; Passed the House on May 9, 1944 (Passed); Passed the Senate on December 1, 1944 (Passed); Reported by the joint conference committee on December 4, 1944; agreed to by the House on December 12, 1944 (Agreed) and by the Senate on December 12, 1944 (Agreed); Signed into law by President Franklin D. Roosevelt on December 22, 1944

The Pick-Sloan Flood Control Act of 1944 (P.L. 78–534), enacted in the 2nd session of the 78th Congress, is U.S. legislation that authorized the construction of numerous dams and modifications to previously existing dams, as well as levees across the United States. Among its various provisions, it established the Southeastern Power Administration and the Southwestern Power Administration, and led to the establishment of the Pick-Sloan Missouri Basin Program.

The Pick-Sloan legislation managed the Missouri River with six intents: hydropower, recreation, water supply, navigation, flood control and fish and wildlife. Over 50 dams and lakes have been built due to this legislation, not just on the mainly affected river but also on tributaries and other connected rivers. Nebraska, as an example, has seen more than eight new lakes created due to the damming of the Missouri and tributaries. The Act also recognized the legitimate rights of states, through the Governor, to impact flood control projects. See 33 US, section 701-1, which declared it to be the policy of the Congress

to recognize the interests and rights of the States in determining the development of the watersheds within their borders and likewise their interests and rights in water utilization and control.

The Act was signed by President Franklin D. Roosevelt on December 22, 1944. It was named for General Lewis A. Pick, head of the Army Corps of Engineers, and W. Glenn Sloan of the Interior Department's Bureau of Reclamation.

== Effects ==
The Lakota, Dakota and Nakota tribes lost 202,000 acres (820 km^{2}). The Three Affiliated Tribes, specifically, lost 155,000 acres (630 km^{2}) in their Fort Berthold Reservation due to the building of the Garrison Dam. The project caused more than 1,500 Native Americans to relocate from the river bottoms of the Missouri river due to the flooding.

The project has successfully controlled flooding throughout the Missouri River basin, provided water for irrigation and municipalities, generated baseload power throughout the central US.

However, the Missouri River dumped millions of cubic feet of soil into the Mississippi River every year, which, deposited the silt into the gulf and formed a string of barrier islands. When the silt was eliminated, the island-building stopped. Biologists sounded the alarm in the 1970s. By the 1990s, the barrier islands were almost gone, and Louisiana was left unprotected from storm surges and oil spills.

== See also ==
- Flood Control Act
- Flood Control Act of 1937
- Missouri River Valley
- Water Resources Development Act
- Rivers and Harbors Act
