= Lake Sharpe =

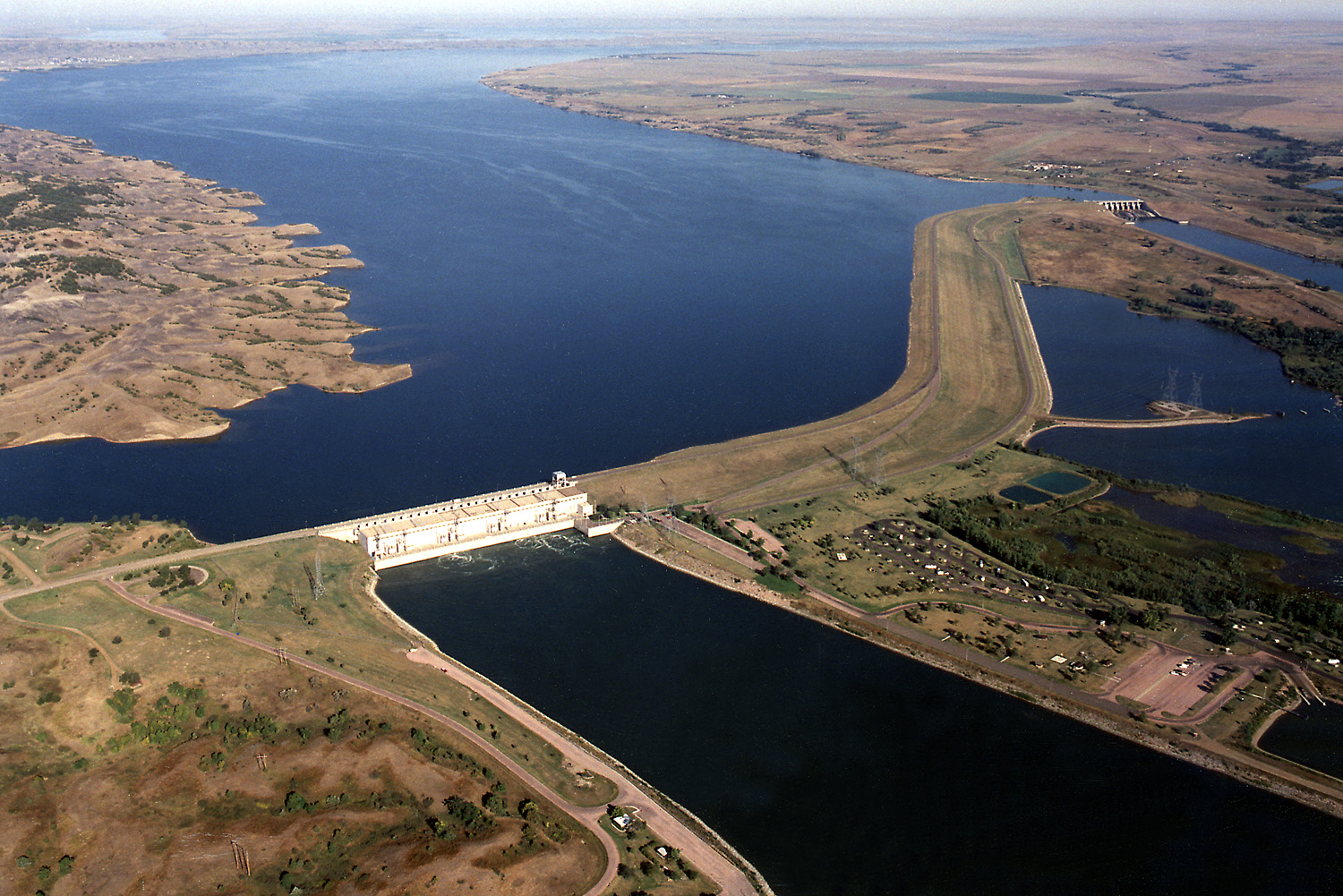
- Lake Sharpe behind Big Bend Dam

- Location within South Dakota Location within the United States
- Location: South Dakota, United States
- Coordinates: 44°03′06″N 99°27′08″W
- Lake type: reservoir
- Primary inflows: Missouri River
- Primary outflows: Missouri River
- Catchment area: 249,330 sq mi (645,800 km^{2})
- Basin countries: United States
- Max. length: 80 miles (130 km)
- Surface area: 56,884 acres (23,020 ha)
- Max. depth: 78 ft (24 m)
- Water volume: 1,910,000 acre⋅ft (2.36 km^{3})
- Shore length^{1}: 200 mi (320 km)
- Surface elevation: 1,444 ft (440 m)
- Islands: Farm Island and La Framboise Island, near Pierre
- Settlements: Pierre, Ft. Pierre, Ft. Thompson, and Lower Brule, South Dakota
- ^{1} Shore length is not a well-defined measure.

Lake Sharpe is a large reservoir impounded by Big Bend Dam on the Missouri River in central South Dakota, United States. The lake has an area of 56,884 acres (230.20 km^{2}) and a maximum depth of 78 ft (24 m). Lake Sharpe is approximately 80 mi (130 km) long, with a shoreline of 200 mi (320 km). Lake Sharpe is the 54th largest reservoir in the United States. The lake starts near Ft. Thompson and stretches upstream to Oahe Dam, near Pierre. The lake is located within the following counties: Buffalo, Lyman, Hyde, Hughes, and Stanley. The Big Bend of the Missouri is about 7 miles (11 km) north of the dam.

Construction of Big Bend Dam began in 1959, and Lake Sharpe was named for Merrill Q. Sharpe, the 17th Governor of South Dakota.

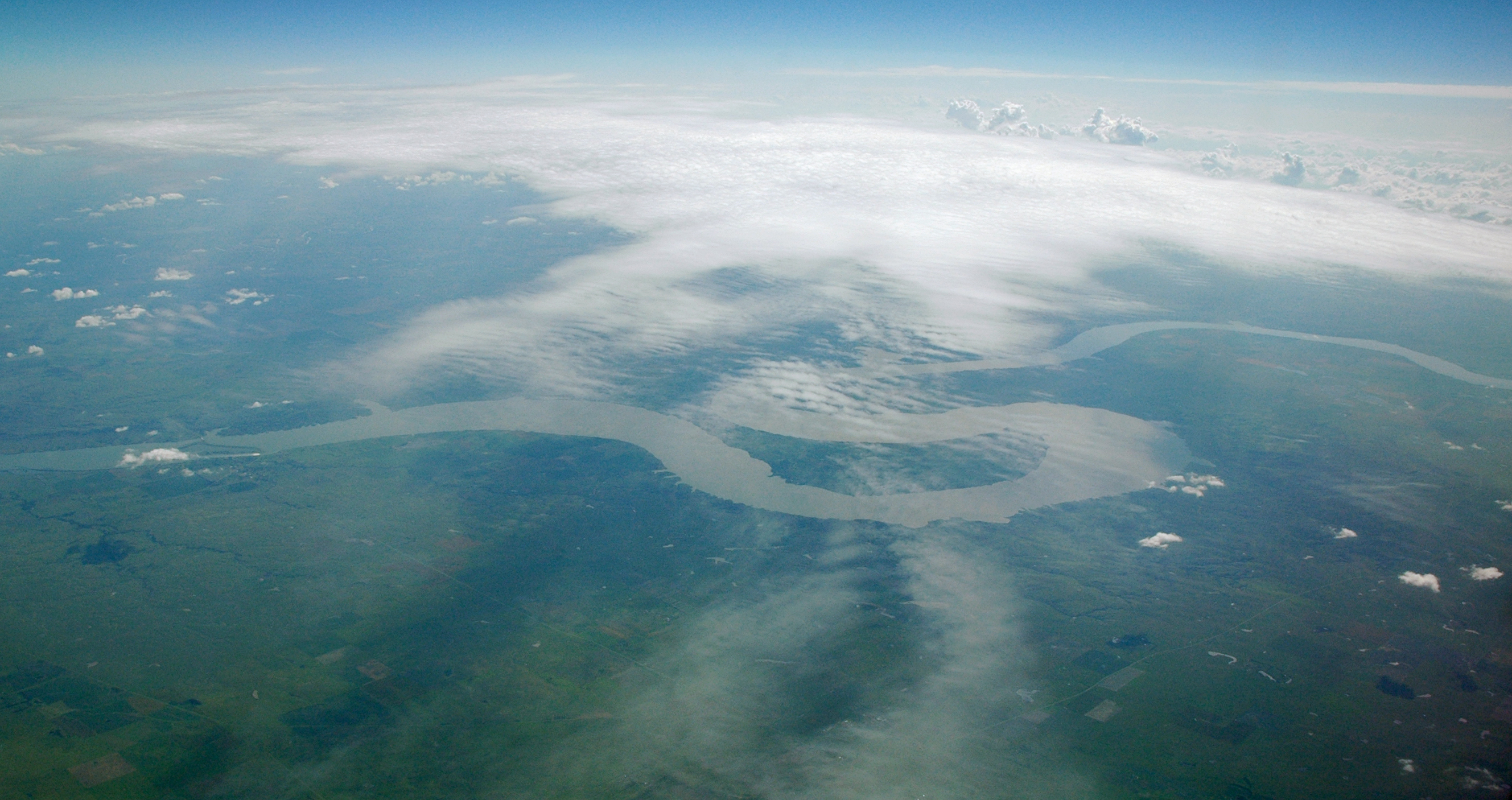
Aerial photograph of the Big Bend in Lake Sharpe, 2011

Species of fish in the reservoir include walleye, sauger, smallmouth bass, channel catfish, flathead catfish, northern pike, white bass, yellow perch, black crappie, and rainbow trout. Walleye are the primary gamefish in the lake, and gizzard shad are the main food source for the walleye. Big game animals include whitetail and mule deer, elk, bison, coyotes and wild turkeys. Waterfowl and upland game birds include ducks, geese, pheasants, prairie chickens, and grouse.

There is over 80,000 acres of public land and water associated around Lake Sharpe. The South Dakota Department of Game, Fish, and Parks maintains several recreation areas and boat launching facilities around the lake. West Bend Recreation Area and Farm Island State Recreation Area are both located on the lake.

The U.S. Army Corps of Engineers maintains recreation areas and wildlife areas near Big Bend Dam, including Left Tailrace Campground.

Much of the western shore of the lake is within the Lower Brule Indian Reservation, while the Crow Creek Indian Reservation lies along the eastern shore. Both tribes lost extensive fertile bottomlands when the government acquired property that would be inundated by the manmade lake. This loss of agricultural lands adversely affected each of the tribes and the ability of their peoples to support themselves on the reservations.

== See also ==
- U.S. Army Corps of Engineers
- Pick-Sloan Plan
- Lake Oahe
- Lake Francis Case
- Lewis and Clark Lake
- List of lakes in South Dakota
