= Fort Thompson, South Dakota =

- CDP
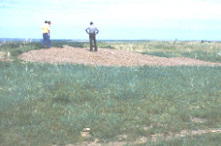
- Fort Thompson Mounds

- Location in Buffalo County and the state of South Dakota
- Coordinates: 44°03′10″N 99°24′48″W
- Country: United States
- State: South Dakota
- County: Buffalo
- Incorporated: 1889

Area
  - Total: 12.60 sq mi (32.63 km^{2})
  - Land: 10.38 sq mi (26.88 km^{2})
  - Water: 2.22 sq mi (5.75 km^{2})
- Elevation: 1,437 ft (438 m)

Population (2020)
  - Total: 1,224
  - Density: 117.9/sq mi (45.54/km^{2})
- Time zone: UTC−6 (Central (CST))
  - Summer (DST): UTC−5 (CDT)
- ZIP code: 57339
- Area code: 605
- FIPS code: 46-22340
- GNIS feature ID: 2393006

Fort Thompson (Lakota/ Dakota: Čhúŋkičakse) is a census-designated place (CDP) in Buffalo County, South Dakota, United States. As of the 2020 census, Fort Thompson had a population of 1,224, making it the largest settlement on the Crow Creek Reservation.

Fort Thompson was named in honor of Clark W. Thompson, superintendent of Indian Affairs.

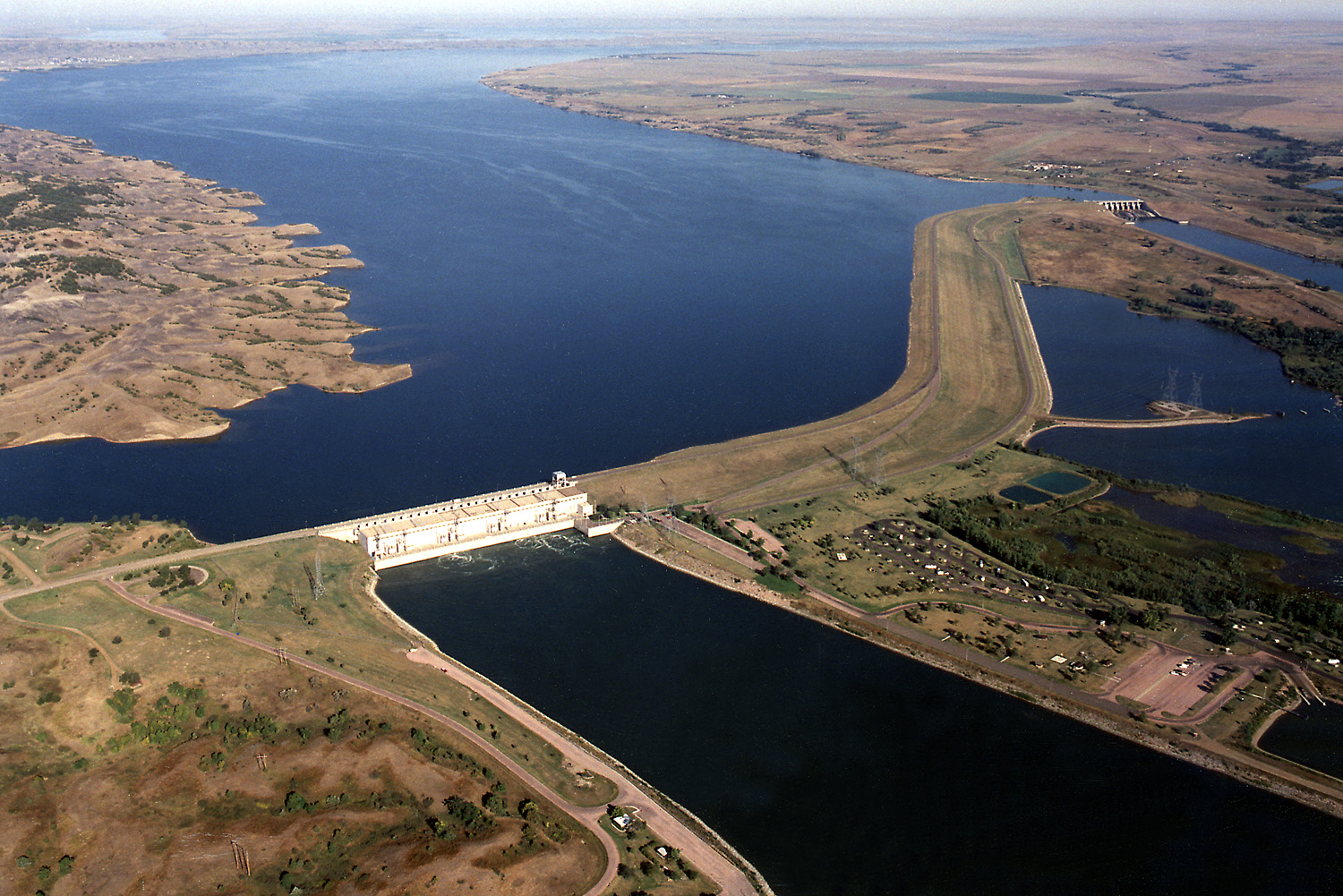
The Big Bend Dam, located near Fort Thompson, July 1998

== Geography ==
According to the United States Census Bureau, the CDP has a total area of 12.6 square miles (33 km^{2}), of which 10.3 square miles (27 km^{2}) is land and 2.3 square miles (6.0 km^{2}) (17.98%) is water.

Big Bend Dam is located just south of Ft. Thompson and impounds Lake Sharpe.

== Demographics ==
Historical population
Census	Pop.	Note	%±
1990	1,088		—
2000	1,375		26.4%
2010	1,282		−6.8%
2020	1,224		−4.5%
U.S. Decennial Census

As of the census of 2000, there were 1,375 people, 325 households, and 265 families residing in the CDP. The population density was 133.5 inhabitants per square mile (51.5/km^{2}). There were 355 housing units at an average density of 34.5 per square mile (13.3/km^{2}). The racial makeup of the CDP was 96.36% Native American, 2.62% White, 0.07% African American, and 0.95% from two or more races. Hispanic or Latino of any race were 0.51% of the population.

There were 325 households, out of which 52.9% had children under the age of 18 living with them, 28.0% were married couples living together, 39.1% had a female householder with no husband present, and 18.2% were non-families. 13.8% of all households were made up of individuals, and 4.9% had someone living alone who was 65 years of age or older. The average household size was 4.18 and the average family size was 4.54.

In the CDP, the population was spread out, with 45.0% under the age of 18, 11.5% from 18 to 24, 24.9% from 25 to 44, 14.0% from 45 to 64, and 4.7% who were 65 years of age or older. The median age was 20 years. For every 100 females, there were 104.6 males. For every 100 females age 18 and over, there were 95.3 males.

The median income for a household in the CDP was $9,191, and the median income for a family was $9,191. Males had a median income of $19,375 versus $18,750 for females. The per capita income for the CDP was $4,030. About 64.0% of families and 64.6% of the population were below the poverty line, including 70.1% of those under age 18 and 58.1% of those age 65 or over.

=== Poverty ===
With such high rates of poverty, unemployment, and other negative social indicators, the living conditions found in the town and county are often compared to a third world nation. Accounts of the town report rundown neighborhoods with old newspapers, tin foil, or old sheets covering windows of some homes. The latest census figures show that 21% of houses do not have a kitchen or plumbing. The housing stock is largely overcrowded, with cases of 15 to 20 people living in a modest house. 2000 census figures show that more than 21% of houses are overcrowded. A quarter of the residents do not have an automobile and have to walk or bicycle very long distances to work or services in the low density area.

== See also ==
- List of census-designated places in South Dakota
