= List of South Dakota state parks =

South Dakota State Parks (Hover mouse over pog to popup clickable link)

The U.S. state of South Dakota operates 13 state parks, 43 recreation areas, 6 nature areas, and 1 trail, totaling approximately 96,000 acres. These sites are administered by the South Dakota Department of Game, Fish, and Parks.

These areas preserve natural geologic features, historic and sacred Plains Indian sites, and historic pioneer settlements and forts. They also provide recreational facilities and access to waterbodies, including the Missouri River, on which there are 25 recreation areas.

South Dakota State Parks and recreation areas range in size from the 19-acre Sandy Shore Recreation Area to the 71,000-acre Custer State Park. It was the first park established in the system, in 1919. Good Earth State Park at Blood Run is the most recent park, added in 2013. System-wide visitation in 2016 was 7,500,000.

== State parks ==
Name	County	Size		Coordinates	Estab- lished	Image	Remarks
Name	County	acres	ha	Coordinates	Estab- lished	Image	Remarks
Bear Butte State Park	Meade	1,935	783	44.45989°N 103.45085°W	1961		Geological laccolith, traditional landmark and sacred religious site for the Lakota Indians.
Custer State Park	Custer	71,000	29,000	43.7706°N 103.3964°W	1919		South Dakota's first and largest state park. Located in the southern Black Hills and known for the scenic Needles Highway, Sylvan Lake, and as a wildlife habitat with a famous herd of bison.
Fisher Grove State Park	Spink	277	112	44.883461°N 98.356702°W	1946		The first stagecoach road from Watertown to Pierre crossed the James River at this location.
Fort Sisseton Historic State Park	Marshall	125	51	45.659398°N 97.528266°W	1959		The remains of historic Fort Sisseton, established in 1864, are preserved within the park.
Good Earth State Park at Blood Run	Lincoln	650	260	43.475595°N 96.5942°W	2013		The largest Oneota cultural site discovered to date in the upper Midwest.
Hartford Beach State Park	Roberts	331	134	45.402196°N 96.673074°W	1945		American Indian burial mounds and former trading post on Big Stone Lake.
Lake Herman State Park	Lake	227	92	43.992878°N 97.160426°W	1946		Wildlife habitat and historic Herman Luce settler's cabin on the eastern shore of Lake Herman.
Newton Hills State Park	Lincoln	948	384	43.219041°N 96.570193°W	1949		Rolling hills and woodland on the southern end of the Coteau des Prairies geological formation.
Oakwood Lakes State Park	Brookings	293	119	44.449753°N 96.981982°W	1945		A former gathering spot for American Indians, the park is nestled among eight connected lakes and contains a historic 1869 log cabin.
Palisades State Park	Minnehaha	434.5	175.8	43.687645°N 96.517166°W	1972		Distinctive Sioux quartzite rock formations along Split Rock Creek.
Roy Lake State Park	Marshall	560	230	45.709686°N 97.448803°W	1946		Fishing, beaches and campgrounds on Roy Lake in the glacial lakes area of South Dakota.
Sica Hollow State Park	Marshall, Roberts	900	360	45.7421°N 97.242668°W	1968		A significant historical site for the Sioux Indians, the park's name comes from the word for evil or bad in Dakota, referring to the red-tinted bogs in the area.
Union Grove State Park	Union	282	114	42.920242°N 96.785321°W	1947		Prairie woodland along Brule Creek with rich birdwatching and fall foliage.

== State recreation areas ==
Name	County	Size		Coordinates	Estab- lished	Image	Remarks
Name	County	acres	ha	Coordinates	Estab- lished	Image	Remarks
Angostura Recreation Area	Fall River	1,125	455	43.345873°N 103.42202°W	1954		Shoreline and beaches on the eastern edge of Angostura Reservoir.
Big Sioux Recreation Area	Minnehaha	430	170	43.57305°N 96.594378°W	1978		Recreation area along the Big Sioux River hosting some of the largest trees in the state.
Burke Lake Recreation Area	Gregory	106	43	43.183192°N 99.260023°W	1947		Recreation area surrounding the 25-acre Burke Lake.
Buryanek Recreation Area	Gregory	166	67	43.415231°N 99.173167°W	1983		Missouri River area where George Shannon of the Lewis and Clark Expedition was lost in 1804.
Chief White Crane Recreation Area	Yankton	186	75	42.851249°N 97.460067°W	2001		Located on the Missouri River and known for its bald eagle habitat, the site is named for a Plains Indian leader who met the Lewis and Clark Expedition nearby in 1804.
Cow Creek Recreation Area	Sully	257	104	44.555685°N 100.47618°W	2001		Fishing area and boat launch on the shore of Lake Oahe on the Missouri River.
Farm Island Recreation Area	Hughes	1,800	730	44.345921°N 100.27995°W	1946		A former island (now connected to mainland via causeway) located on the Missouri River.
Indian Creek Recreation Area	Walworth	187	76	45.522137°N 100.38682°W	2001		Camping area and boat launch on the Missouri River.
Lake Alvin Recreation Area	Lincoln	59	24		1957		Beach and fishing area surrounding Lake Alvin.
Lake Cochrane Recreation Area	Deuel	88	36	44.714191°N 96.478932°W	1974		Recreation area nestled between Lake Cochrane and Lake Oliver.
Lake Hiddenwood Recreation Area	Walworth	332	134	45.549856°N 99.985001°W	1947		One of the earliest artificial lakes in South Dakota, established in 1927.
Lake Louise Recreation Area	Hand	320	130	44.620547°N 99.140553°W	1945		Area adjacent to the 164-acre Lake Louise.
Lake Poinsett Recreation Area	Brookings	196	79	44.534183°N 97.083956°W	1976		Camping area and boat launch on the southern shore of Lake Poinsett.
Lake Thompson Recreation Area	Kingsbury	416	168	44.323468°N 97.434631°W	1998		Located on the northern shore of Lake Thompson, better known as one of the "Twin Lakes" in Laura Ingalls Wilder's Little House on the Prairie book series.
Lake Vermillion Recreation Area	McCook	267	108	43.594764°N 97.185172°W	1967		Fishing, swimming and boating area on the southern end of the 512-acre Lake Vermillion.
Lewis & Clark Recreation Area	Yankton	928	376	42.867723°N 97.521526°W	1966		Located upriver and adjacent to Gavins Point Dam on the former site of Fort Yankton.
Little Moreau Recreation Area	Dewey	160	65	45.349193°N 101.08448°W	1962		Grassland and former winter campgrounds of Plains Indian tribes.
Llewellyn Johns Recreation Area	Perkins	114	46	45.775402°N 102.17742°W	1945		Campground located where explorer Hugh Glass was attacked by a grizzly bear in 1823 and near the passage of George Armstrong Custer's 1874 expedition to the Black Hills.
Mina Lake Recreation Area	Edmonds	300	120	45.447464°N 98.74082°W	1950		Boating, fishing and swimming area on the shore of the man-made Mina Lake reservoir.
North Point Recreation Area	Charles Mix	1,055	427	43.083064°N 98.550327°W	2001		Located on the eastern shore of Lake Francis Case on the Missouri River above Fort Randall Dam.
North Wheeler Recreation Area	Charles Mix			43.171927°N 98.825552°W	2001		Small park and campground with access to Lake Francis Case on the Missouri River.
Oahe Downstream Recreation Area	Stanley	933	378	44.436944°N 100.39978°W	2002		Located on the Missouri River just below Oahe Dam.
Okobojo Point Recreation Area	Sully	135	55	44.57596°N 100.49547°W	2001		A sandy peninsula on the shore of Lake Oahe on the Missouri River.
Pease Creek Recreation Area	Charles Mix	600	240	43.140208°N 98.731855°W	2001		River access at the confluence of Pease Creek and the Missouri River.
Pelican Lake Recreation Area	Codington	152	62	44.852222°N 97.208448°W	1978		Camping, boating and other activities on the southern shore of Pelican Lake.
Pickerel Lake Recreation Area	Day	368	149	45.485552°N 97.248138°W	1949		Comprising east and west sections on the 955-acre Pickerel Lake.
Pierson Ranch Recreation Area	Yankton	60	24	42.873642°N 97.482167°W	2001		Primarily a campground located between Lewis & Clark Recreation Area and Chief White Crane Recreation Area on Gavins Point Dam.
Platte Creek Recreation Area	Charles Mix	252	102	43.298531°N 98.997651°W	1983		Fishing and river access at the junction of Platte Creek and Lake Francis Case on the Missouri River.
Randall Creek Recreation Area	Gregory	184	74	43.051021°N 98.555139°W	2002		Just downstream from Fort Randall Dam on the Missouri River and noted as a habitat for bald eagles.
Revheim Bay Recreation Area	Walworth	296	120	45.522778°N 100.4074°W	2001		Day-use park on the Missouri River near Mobridge.
Richmond Lake Recreation Area	Brown	349	141	45.539902°N 98.611093°W	1947		Recreation area on Richmond Lake with separate units for camping, wildlife viewing and boat access.
Rocky Point Recreation Area	Butte	350	140	44.709229°N 103.71253°W	2005		Located on the 8,000-acre Belle Fourche Reservoir.
Sandy Shore Recreation Area	Codington	19	7.7	44.893844°N 97.240953°W	1969		Beach area on the banks of Lake Kampeska.
Shadehill Recreation Area	Perkins	2,150	870	45.761144°N 102.21849°W	1952		Extensive shoreline of Shadehill Reservoir, one of the larger lakes in western South Dakota.
Sheps Canyon Recreation Area	Fall River	6,565	2,657				Campground, water access and horse riding trails on the western side of Angostura Reservoir.
Snake Creek Recreation Area	Charles Mix	695	281	43.389979°N 99.119491°W	1983		Access and activities on Lake Francis Case on the Missouri River.
Spring Creek Recreation Area	Hughes	149	60	44.546055°N 100.486216°W	2001		A day-use park at the junction of Spring Creek and Lake Oahe on the Missouri River.
Springfield Recreation Area	Bon Homme	24	9.7	42.855881°N 97.884586°W	1957		Access to Lake Oahe on the Missouri River.
Swan Creek Recreation Area	Walworth	106	43	45.319177°N 100.3°W	1983		Bluffs and water access on the eastern shore of Lake Oahe on the Missouri River.
Walkers Point Recreation Area	Lake	41	17	43.956806°N 97.028614°W	1990		Camping and access to the 2,800-acre Lake Madison.
West Bend Recreation Area	Hughes	154	62	44.170744°N 99.721021°W	1984		Recreation area with marina on Lake Sharpe of the Missouri River.
West Pollock Recreation Area	Campbell	243	98	45.884314°N 100.33565°W	2001		Water access and hunting area on Lake Oahe of the Missouri River.
West Whitlock Recreation Area	Potter	260	110	45.048094°N 100.26607°W	1983		Missouri River access and historic campsite for Arikara and Mandan Plains Indians.

== State nature areas, trails and other areas ==
Name	County	Size		Coordinates	Estab- lished	Image	Remarks
Name	County	acres	ha	Coordinates	Estab- lished	Image	Remarks
Adams Homestead and Nature Preserve	Union	1,600	650	42.53905°N 96.528179°W	1997		Homestead and nature preserve on the Missouri River, this area contains one of the largest stands of cottonwood trees in the state.
Beaver Creek Nature Area	Minnehaha	165	67	43.558174°N 96.541611°W	1967		Natural prairie, tilled field and a historic 1870s log cabin.
Big Stone Island Nature Area	Roberts	100	40	45.34723°N 96.487953°W	1976		Island in Big Stone Lake that was previously a Plains Indian village and later a resort.
LaFramboise Island Nature Area	Hughes	555	225	44.361169°N 100.36242°W	2002		Sand bar island in the Missouri River.
George S. Mickelson Trail	Lawrence, Pennington, Custer, Fall River				1998		A 109-mile long mixed-use trail running from Bear Butte to Edgemont along the historic Burlington Northern rail line through the Black Hills.
Spearfish Canyon Nature Area	Lawrence	127	51	44.349956°N 103.94432°W	2008		Popular waterfall viewing area in Spearfish Canyon.
Spirit Mound Historic Prairie	Clay	320	130	42.867608°N 96.954431°W	2001		A prominent hill on the prairie, Spirit Mound is the site of Plains Indian legends and was visited by members of the Lewis and Clark Expedition.

== Proposed expansion ==
The state is currently exploring establishing a new state park in Spearfish Canyon. The proposed Spearfish Canyon State Park would encompass 1,600-acres including Spearfish Falls, Roughlock Falls, and portions of Little Spearfish Canyon. The land is currently owned by the state of South Dakota and the federal government.

== See also ==
- List of U.S. national parks
