= Shadehill, South Dakota =

Unincorporated community in South Dakota, U.S.

Coordinates: 45°45′56″N 102°10′46″W

Shadehill is an unincorporated community in Perkins County, in the U.S. state of South Dakota.

== History ==
Shadehill was founded in 1916. The community is reportedly named after a nearby hill which, in turn, was named for a Col. L.M. Shade, who was a member of the State Highway Commission when South Dakota Highway 73 was being built through the vicinity. A post office called Shadehill was established in 1918, and remained in operation until 1965.

Shadehill Dam and Shadehill Reservoir, completed in 1951, are near the town site.
