= Chief White Crane Recreation Area =

State recreation area in South Dakota, United States

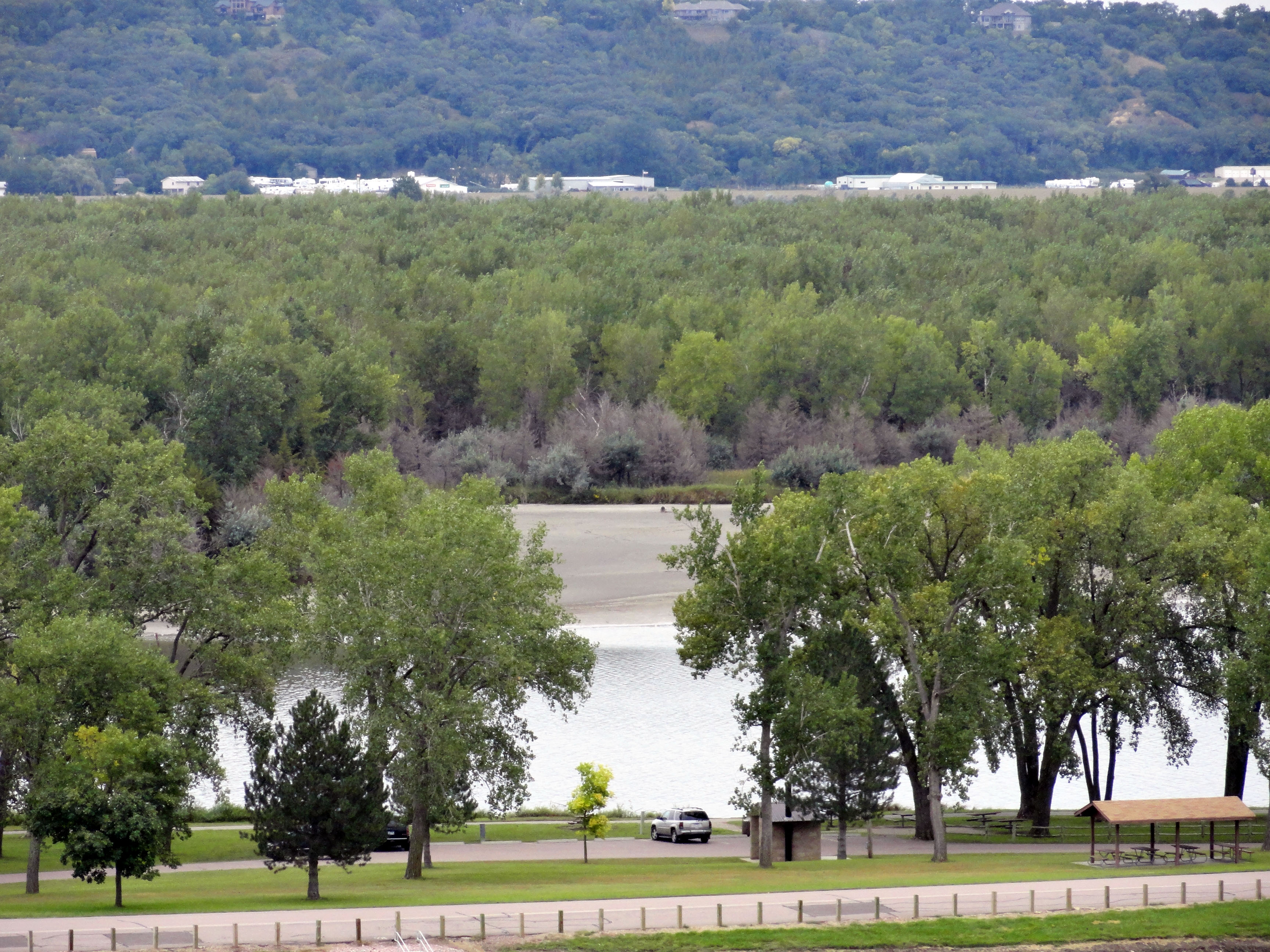
- Lake Yankton

- Location within South Dakota
- Location: Yankton County, South Dakota, United States
- Coordinates: 42°51′05″N 97°27′36″W
- Area: 186 acres (75 ha)
- Established: 2001 (as South Dakota State Recreation Area)
- Administrator: South Dakota Department of Game, Fish and Parks
- Website: Official website

Chief White Crane Recreation Area is a state recreation area in southeastern South Dakota, United States. It is located about 5 miles (8.0 km) west of Yankton and located on the shores of the Missouri River and Lake Yankton. The recreation area is located about 1.5 miles (2.4 km) downstream of Gavins Point Dam and Lewis and Clark Lake.

== Recreation ==
There are 145 campsites and 10 camper cabins. The area is popular for fishing, kayaking, and canoeing on Lake Yankton and the Missouri River. In winter months the area is a well-known roosting spot for the Bald eagle along the Missouri River. The campground and recreation area were constructed by the U.S. Army Corps of Engineers (USACE) following construction of the nearby Gavins Point Dam. In 2001 legislation transferred ownership of the recreation area from the USACE to the South Dakota Department of Game, Fish and Parks as a part of the Lewis & Clark Recreation Area.

The area is adjacent to Training Dike Recreation Area, along the Missouri River.

== See also ==
- List of South Dakota state parks
