= Lake Alvin Recreation Area =

State recreation area in South Dakota, United States

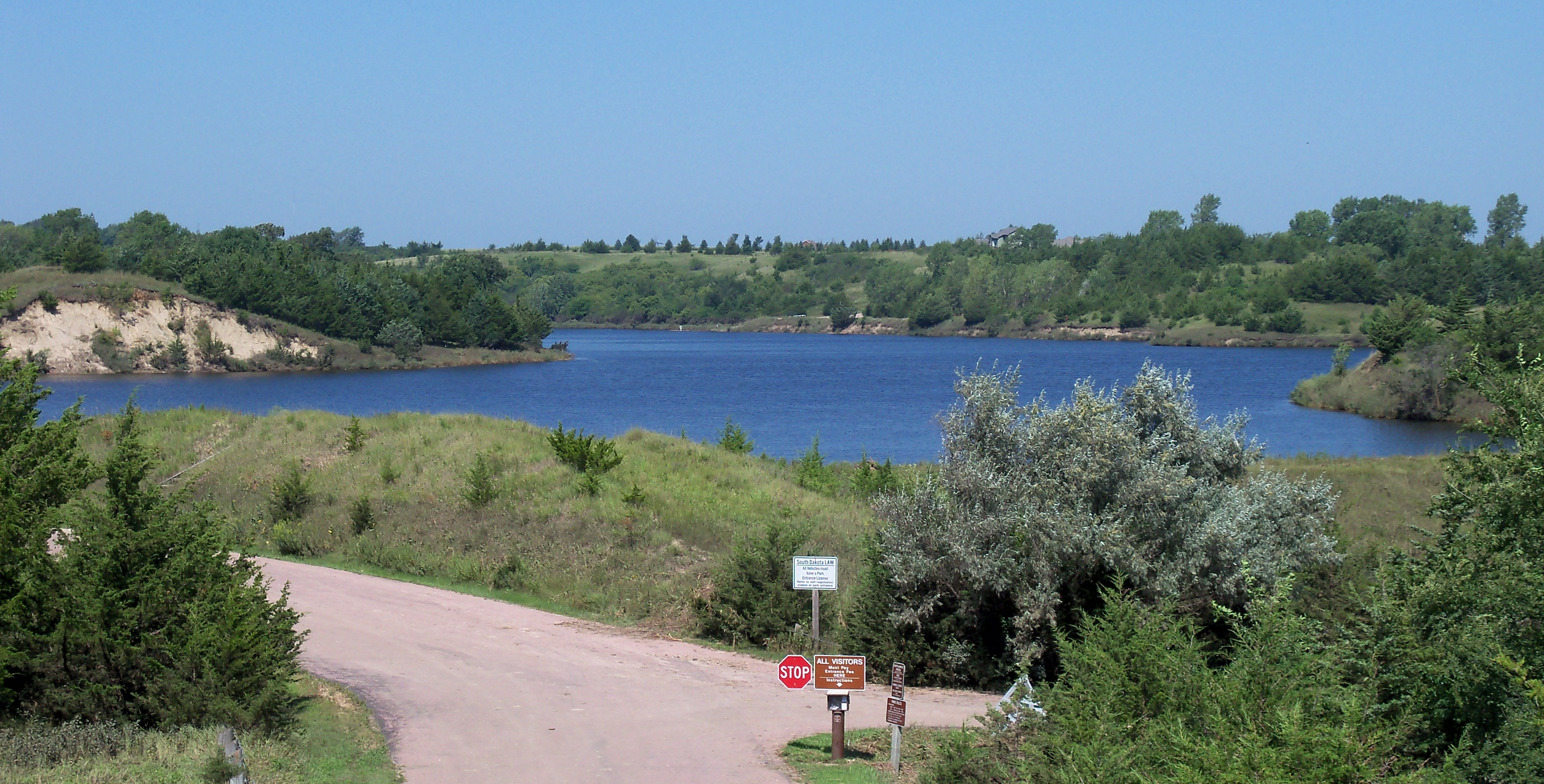

- Location within South Dakota
- Location: Lincoln County, South Dakota, United States
- Coordinates: 43°26′21″N 96°37′08″W
- Area: 59 acres (24 ha)
- Established: 1957
- Administrator: South Dakota Department of Game, Fish and Parks
- Website: Official website

Lake Alvin Recreation Area is a state recreation area in Lincoln County, South Dakota in the United States. The recreation area is popular for fishing, hiking, and swimming at Lake Alvin. It is approximately 13 miles southeast of Sioux Falls and just west of the Iowa border and the Big Sioux River.

== History ==
The park was created in 1957 after construction of a dam across the lower end of Nine Mile Creek created Lake Alvin. The lake and its associated recreation area bear the first name of Alvin Dempewolf, a soldier from Harrisburg, South Dakota, who died at the age of 25 while serving overseas during World War I.

== See also ==
- List of South Dakota state parks
