= Training Dike Recreation Area =

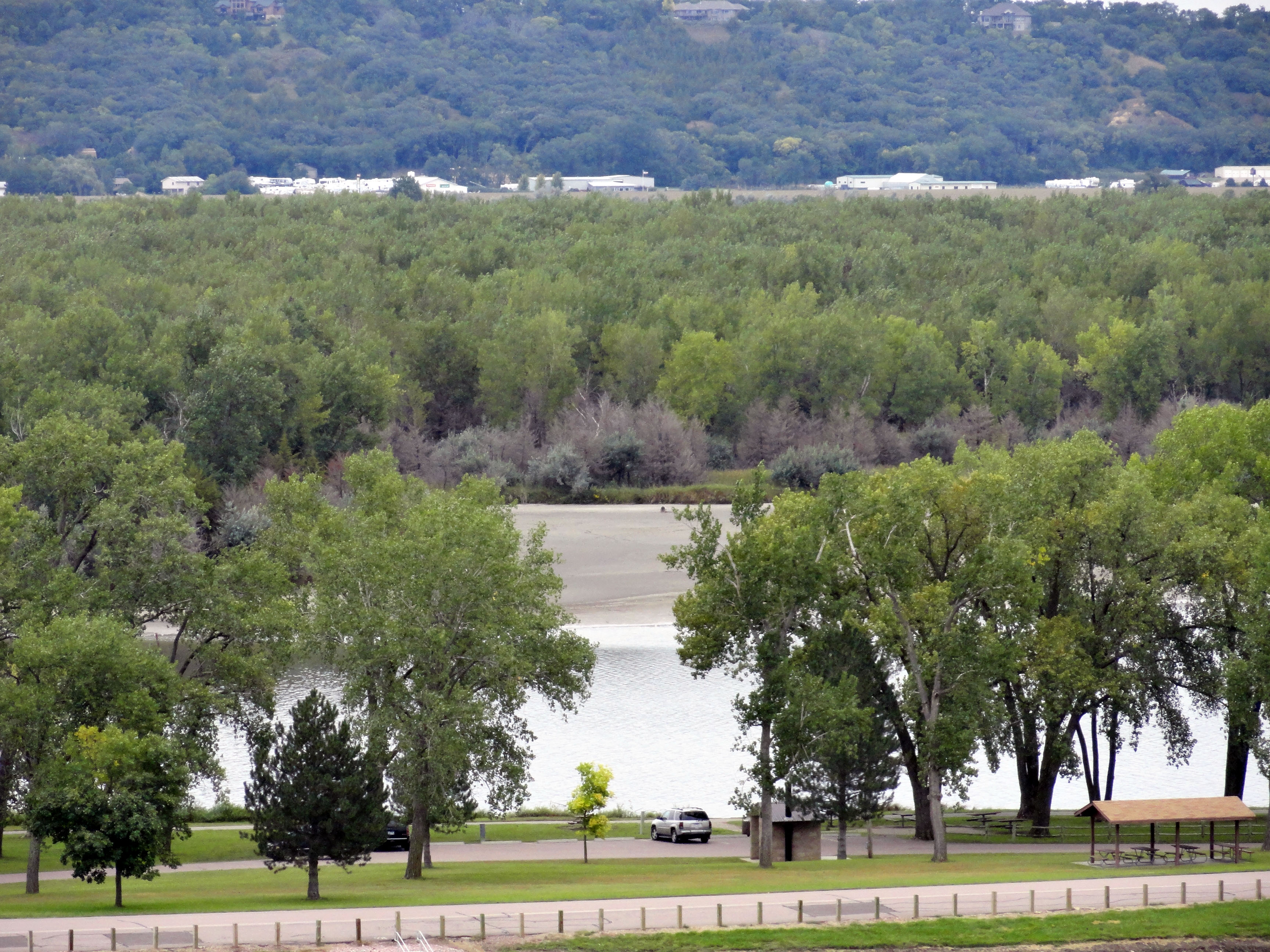
- Training Dike Recreation Area, with Lake Yankton in the background.

- Location within Nebraska Location within the United States
- Location: Cedar County, Nebraska and Yankton County, South Dakota, U.S.
- Nearest city: Yankton, South Dakota
- Coordinates: 42.852524°N 97.473053°W
- Established: 1958
- Governing body: U.S. Army Corps of Engineers
- Website: U.S. Army Corps of Engineers - Gavins Point Project

Training Dike Recreation Area, also called Training Dike Day-Use Area is a U.S. Army Corps of Engineers public recreation area located immediately downstream of Gavins Point Dam and Lewis and Clark Lake on the north bank of the Missouri River. The area is about 4.5 miles (7.2 km) west of Yankton. The area is located mostly in Cedar County, Nebraska, with a small portion located in Yankton County, South Dakota.

== History and background ==
The area is located on a long and narrow strip of land called the Training Dike between the Missouri River and Lake Yankton. The Training Dike was constructed following construction of Gavins Point Dam in order to "train" the river flowing out of the dam and power plant to its current flow, channelizing the river. Although the area is located on the north bank of the Missouri River, it is often incorrectly assumed the area is a part of South Dakota. However upon Nebraska Statehood, the original midpoint of the main channel of the Missouri River was determined to be the state line - which would put the stateline between Cottonwood Recreation Area and Pierson Ranch Recreation Area about 1 mile north of Training Dike.

== Recreation ==
Training Dike Recreation Area is popular for public recreation access along the shoreline of both the Missouri River and Gavins Point Dam tailrace, along with Lake Yankton. The area is popular for fishing immediately downstream of the dam, and the area known as "The Bubble" which is the local name for the outlet of Lake Yankton. There are numerous shore fishing access areas, two boat ramps - one for the Missouri River and Lake Yankton. There are also kayak/canoe launches, a multi-purpose paved trail, picnic areas, swim beach and a demonstration prairie restoration area. There are no camping or overnight facilities located in this recreation area, however multiple campgrounds and additional parks are located within a few miles of the area, including Lewis & Clark Recreation Area, Chief White Crane Recreation Area, Cottonwood Recreation Area, Nebraska Tailwaters Recreation Area and Pierson Ranch Recreation Area.
