= Adams Homestead and Nature Preserve =

- Location within South Dakota
- Interactive map of Adams Homestead and Nature Preserve
- Location: Union County, South Dakota, United States
- Coordinates: 42°32′21″N 96°31′41″W
- Area: 1,500 acres (610 ha)
- Established: 1997
- Administrator: South Dakota Department of Game, Fish and Parks
- Website: Official website

Adams Homestead and Nature Preserve is a South Dakota state park in Union County, South Dakota in the United States. The former Stephen Searls Adams homestead property dates to 1872 and covers 1500 acres on the Missouri River. The property was donated in 1984 and the park was established in 1997. The park is open for year-round recreation including hiking and cross country skiing.

== See also ==
- List of South Dakota state parks
