= Springfield Recreation Area =

State recreation area in South Dakota, United States

- Location within South Dakota
- Location: Bon Homme County, South Dakota, United States
- Coordinates: 42°51′21″N 97°53′04″W
- Area: 24 acres (9.7 ha)
- Established: 1957
- Administrator: South Dakota Department of Game, Fish and Parks
- Website: Official website

Springfield Recreation Area is a state recreation area in Bon Homme County, South Dakota in the United States. The recreation area is located on the upper part of Lewis and Clark Lake, and is popular for boating, fishing, and hunting. There is a 20-site campground and a boat launch to access the lake and the Missouri River. The area is about 30 miles west of Yankton. Ownership was transferred from the U.S. Army Corps of Engineers to South Dakota Game, Fish and Parks in 2002.

== See also ==
- List of South Dakota state parks
- Gavins Point Dam
