= Good Earth State Park =

State park in South Dakota, United States

- Location within South Dakota
- Location: Lincoln County, South Dakota, United States
- Coordinates: 43°28′48″N 96°36′49″W
- Area: 588 acres (238 ha)
- Established: 2013
- Administrator: South Dakota Department of Game, Fish and Parks
- Website: Official website

Good Earth State Park is a South Dakota State Park in Lincoln County, South Dakota in the United States along the Big Sioux River. The park includes the Blood Run Site, a National Historic Landmark significant for its history as a settlement for thousands of Native Americans. A visitor center offers displays about the site's significance. The park was dedicated on July 19, 2013, and is open for year-round recreation including hiking.

== History ==
Good Earth State Park occupies part of the Blood Run site which is an area that has been inhabited from the 1300's to the early 1700's. it is one of the largest known Oneota habitation in North America, and the National Park Service designated it a historical landmark. Archaeologist Adrien Hannus has said the village's population of a few hundred could swell to several thousands when people would gather around the Big Sioux River to trade, burials were held on both sides of the river. The ancestors of the tribes that lived there were there before any state boundary existed.

The park was dedicated in July 2013 by the South Dakota Governor Dennis Daugaard. The visitor center was created in 2017 which features life sized displays and hand painted murals that depict the lives of the Oneota people. It also includes a theater with a 20 minute film displaying cultural history.

In 2021, Game, Fish and Parks announced that the Foundation would acquire the Spring Creek gold course. Hannus noted that about 1,000 artifacts had been flagged when the course was built in the 1990's and cautioned that moving soil there could disturb more. Parks director Scott Simpson said no ground would be disturbed without prior cultural clearance, and that the department hosts representatives of the tribes with ties to the site each year.

== See also ==
- List of South Dakota state parks
