= Platte Creek Recreation Area =

State recreation area in South Dakota, United States

- Location within South Dakota
- Location: Charles Mix County, South Dakota, United States
- Coordinates: 43°17′55″N 98°59′52″W
- Area: 252 acres (102 ha)
- Established: 1983
- Administrator: South Dakota Department of Game, Fish and Parks
- Website: Official website

Platte Creek Recreation Area is a South Dakota state recreation area located on the eastern shore of Lake Francis Case, a Missouri River Reservoir in Gregory County, South Dakota in the United States. The recreation area is 252 acres (102 ha). The area is open for year-round recreation including camping, swimming, fishing, hiking and boating.

== See also ==
- Fort Randall
- List of South Dakota state parks
