= Union Grove State Park (South Dakota) =

State park in South Dakota, United States

- Location within South Dakota
- Location: Union County, South Dakota, United States
- Coordinates: 42°55′13″N 96°47′07″W
- Area: 499 acres (202 ha)
- Established: 1946
- Administrator: South Dakota Department of Game, Fish and Parks
- Website: Official website

Union Grove State Park is a South Dakota state park located 11 miles south of Beresford in Union County, South Dakota, United States. The park is open for year-round recreation including camping, horseback riding, biking, hiking and cross country skiing.
