= Farm Island Recreation Area =

State recreation area in South Dakota, United States

- Location within South Dakota
- Location: Hughes County, South Dakota, United States
- Coordinates: 44°20′45″N 100°16′48″W
- Area: 1,800 acres (730 ha)
- Established: 1946
- Administrator: South Dakota Department of Game, Fish and Parks
- Website: Official website

Farm Island Recreation Area is a state recreation area in Hughes County, South Dakota in the United States. It is named for Farm Island located in the Missouri River, just downstream of Pierre, the state capitol. The island is now connected to the main shore via a causeway. The area is popular for camping, hiking, fishing, boating, and other water-based recreational opportunities.

== See also ==
- List of South Dakota state parks
