= Big Stone Island Nature Area =

- Location within South Dakota
- Interactive map of Big Stone Island Nature Area
- Location: Roberts County, South Dakota, United States
- Coordinates: 45°20′50″N 96°29′17″W
- Area: 100 acres (40 ha)
- Established: 1976
- Administrator: South Dakota Department of Game, Fish and Parks
- Website: Official website

Big Stone Island Nature Area is a nature area on Big Stone Island in Big Stone Lake in Roberts County, South Dakota. The island is also known as Kite Island and Big Island and is near the border with Minnesota. Originally the island was a village used by the Plains Indians. During the late 1800s and early 1900s several resorts were located on the island but were abandoned. In the 1940s during World War II the island was used by military aircraft to practice take-offs and landings. The area is only accessible by boat or canoe and today preserves the island for wildlife.

== See also ==
- List of South Dakota state parks
