= Shadehill Recreation Area =

State recreation area in South Dakota, United States

- Location within South Dakota
- Location: Perkins County, South Dakota, United States
- Coordinates: 45°45′40″N 102°13′07″W
- Area: 2,150 acres (870 ha)
- Established: 1952
- Administrator: South Dakota Department of Game, Fish and Parks
- Website: Official website

Shadehill Recreation Area is a state recreation area in South Dakota located around the Shadehill Reservoir in Perkins County. The recreation area is administered by the South Dakota Department of Game, Fish, and Parks. It covers 2,287 acres and offers campgrounds, beaches, access for boating, fishing and other water activities.

== See also ==
- List of South Dakota state parks
