= Oahe Downstream Recreation Area =

State recreation area in South Dakota, United States

- Location within South Dakota
- Location: Stanley County, South Dakota, United States
- Coordinates: 44°26′13″N 100°23′59″W
- Area: 456 acres (185 ha)
- Established: 2002 (as a state recreation area)
- Administrator: South Dakota Department of Game, Fish and Parks
- Website: Official website

Oahe Downstream Recreation Area is a state recreation area in Stanley County, South Dakota in the United States. The recreation area is named for being immediately downstream of the Oahe Dam and Lake Oahe, a U.S. Army Corps of Engineers dam and reservoir. The recreation area is located along the Missouri River seven miles upstream of the state capitol of Pierre, and is popular for camping, fishing and other water-based recreation.

== History ==
The recreation area was developed by the U.S. Army Corps of Engineers following construction of Oahe Dam. Legislation passed by Congress in 2002 transferred management of the recreation area to the State of South Dakota under terms of a lease in perpetuity from the Army Corps of Engineers.
