= Gold cyanidation ban =

A gold cyanidation ban refers to the legislation that bans mining gold through the gold cyanidation technique.

Germany, Czech Republic, Hungary and Costa Rica have such bans, as well as the US states of Montana and Wisconsin and several Argentine provinces.

== Americas ==
=== Argentina ===
A number of Argentine provinces banned cyanide mining, but there is no ban at the federal level.

- Chubut Province banned both the cyanide mining as well as open-pit mining to extract metals (law 5001/August 5, 2003)
- Río Negro Province banned the usage of cyanides in the extraction, development and industrialization of metals (law 3981/July 21, 2005)
- Tucumán Province banned both the cyanide mining as well as open-pit mining to extract metals (law 7879/April 20, 2007)
- Mendoza Province banned the usage of cyanides in the exploration, prospecting, development and industrialization of metals (law 7722/June 20, 2007)
- La Pampa Province banned open-pit mining to extract metals, as well as the usage of cyanides for prospecting, exploring, developing, extracting, storing and industrializing metals obtained through any extraction method, (law 2349/August 16, 2007)
- Cordoba Province banned open-pit mining to extract metals, as well as using cyanides for prospecting, exploring, developing, extracting, storing and industrializing metals (law 9526/September 24, 2008)
- San Luis Province banned the usage of cyanides in prospecting, exploration, developing and industrializing metals (law 634/January 10, 2008)
- La Rioja Province banned the usage of cyanides to extract metals (law 8137/August 3, 2007), however the ban was repealed (law 8355/September 26, 2008)

=== Costa Rica ===
In 2002, Costa Rica passed a moratorium on open-pit cyanide-leach mining.

=== United States ===
In 1998 Mono County in California effectively banned the usage of cyanide and other chemicals for mining or processing ore through a county ordinance.,

The US state of Montana banned open pit heap leaching and vat leaching using cyanide for gold mining following a citizen's initiative, Initiative 137, proposed by the Montana Environmental Information Center that was approved through a referendum on November 6, 1998. The law was codified in MCA 82-4-390. In the Seven Up Pete Venture v. State case, the Supreme Court of Montana found that the ban does not constitute a violation of the Contract Clause of the US Constitution.

The US state of Wisconsin banned in 2001 the usage of cyanides for mining or ore processing.

The Summit, Costilla, Gunnison, Conejos and Gilpin counties in Colorado banned cyanide mining. However, the Colorado Supreme Court ruled in Colorado Mining Association v. Board of Commissioners of Summit County that the counties, as subdivisions of the state, may not ban chemicals allowed by the Colorado Mined Land Reclamation Act.

The voters of Lawrence County, South Dakota voted for a local ordinance banning new permits for surface mining on public land in a national forest. This was meant to ban extraction of gold and silver in the Spearfish Canyon area of the Black Hills National Forest. The courts decided in the South Dakota Mining Association Inc. v. Lawrence County that the federal law (which encourages exploration, mining and extraction of valuable minerals) overrides county regulations.

== Europe ==
=== European Union ===
The European Parliament voted in 2010 a motion for a resolution urging the European Commission to initiate a complete ban of cyanide mining, however the European Commission refused to propose legislation to implement such a ban. Janez Potočnik, European Commissioner for Environment, argued that a ban would not be "justified from environmental and health point of views" and that closing down gold mines using cyanides in Europe would be "detrimental to employment".

=== Czech Republic ===
In 2002, the Czech Parliament decided to ban gold cyanide leaching.

=== Germany ===
In 2006, Germany established a gradual reduction of allowed cyanides in mining.

=== Hungary ===
In December 2009, the Hungarian Parliament voted for a complete ban of cyanide mining in the country following a campaign organized by the "Cyanide-Free Hungary!" coalition which was organized following the 2000 Baia Mare cyanide spill which affected Hungary's rivers.
