= Sandy Shore Recreation Area =

State recreation area in South Dakota, United States

- Location within South Dakota
- Location: Codington County, South Dakota, United States
- Coordinates: 44°53′38″N 97°14′27″W
- Area: 19 acres (7.7 ha)
- Established: 1969
- Administrator: South Dakota Department of Game, Fish and Parks
- Website: Official website

Sandy Shore Recreation Area is a South Dakota State Recreation Area in east-central South Dakota, United States, near Watertown. The recreation area is located on the shore of Lake Kampeska, a 5,250-acre (21 km2) inland glacial lake. Within the recreation area is a beach, boat ramp, 17-site campground and canoe/kayak rentals. At 19 acres in size, it is South Dakota's smallest state park.

== See also ==
- List of South Dakota state parks
