= Newton Hills State Park =

State park in South Dakota, United States

- Location within South Dakota
- Location: Lincoln County, South Dakota, United States
- Coordinates: 43°13′09″N 96°34′13″W
- Area: 1,063 acres (430 ha)
- Elevation: 1,309 ft (399 m)
- Established: 1945
- Administrator: South Dakota Department of Game, Fish and Parks
- Website: Official website

Newton Hills State Park is a South Dakota state park in Lincoln County, South Dakota in the United States. The park is 1,063 acres (430 ha) and sits at an elevation of 1,309 feet (399 m). The park is open for year-round recreation including camping, swimming, fishing, hiking and boating. It is 12 miles (19 km) east of Interstate 29 and south of Canton.

== History ==
Newton Hills State Park is named for William Newton who was one of the first European American settlers to make a home in the area. Newton made his homestead in Lincoln County in the 1850s. His wife was a mid-wife and until the 1870s she was the only white person in the area who had the skills to deliver a baby or provide health care for the sick.

Some of the first people to live in the area were Native Americans from the Woodland Indian Culture. Archaeologists have discovered burial mounds and artifacts that have been dated back to 300 BC to 900 AD. The park is surrounded by a vast open prairie. But it is heavily forested making it a unique setting. The dark forests of the park have prompted many legends. Tales of buried gold and hideaways for horse thieves and robbers have been passed on through the years. In 1859 a small unit of the United States Cavalry was chased into the forest by a group of Lakota warriors. Legend holds that the soldiers had a supply of gold which they buried in the park before they were killed by the Native Americans. Several searches have been made to locate the site of the battle and the gold, but so far nothing has been found. Frank and Jesse James used the forests of what is now the park as a temporary hideout after their famous robbery of a bank in Northfield, Minnesota

In 2021, the park expanded, absorbing land that had been owned by the Boy Scouts of America, Sioux Council. The land had been used by the council for scouting programs since the 1930s, but was falling behind the national Boy Scouts of America standards for such sites. The acquisition was facilitated by The Conservation Fund with additional funding from the US Forest Service's Forest Legacy Program.

== Recreation ==
Newton Hills State Park's year-round recreational opportunities include cabins, group lodge, seasonal campground, horse and mountain bike trails, cross-country skiing and snowshoeing.

Lake Lakota is open to fishing, swimming and boating. The common game fish are perch, bass, catfish and a variety of panfish. Newton Hills State Park is open to hunting. White-tailed deer and wild turkey may be taken with a bow and arrow. Other animals seen in the park include marmots, rabbits, squirrels and foxes.

The park has long been the host location for the Sioux River Folk Fest.
