= Lake Yankton (South Dakota) =

- Cottonwood Lake
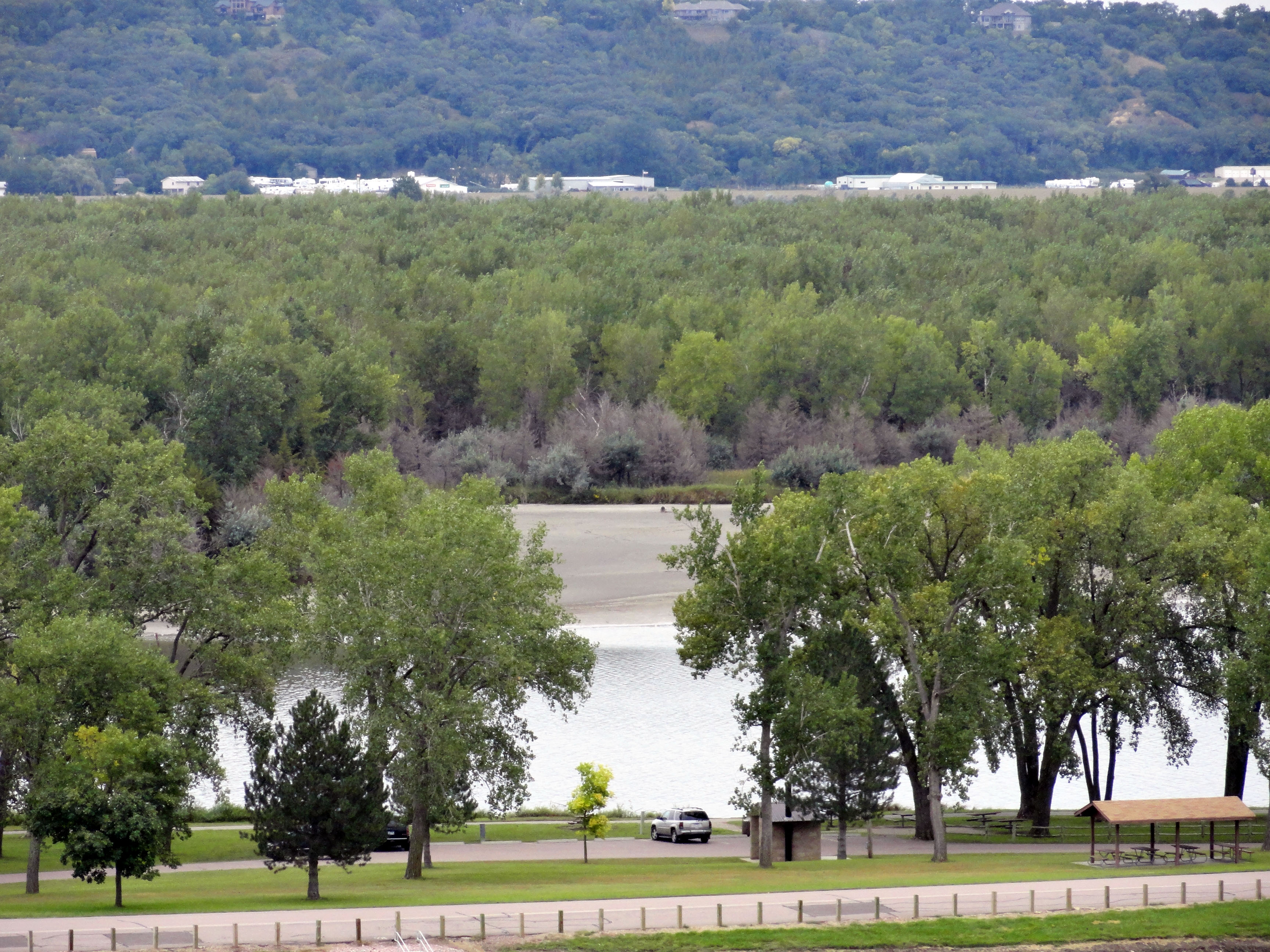
- Lake Yankton, as seen from the Lewis & Clark Visitor Center.

- Location within South Dakota Location within the United States
- Location: Cedar County, Nebraska and Yankton County, South Dakota
- Coordinates: 42°51′20″N 97°28′21″W
- Type: reservoir
- Primary outflows: Missouri River
- Basin countries: United States
- Max. length: 1 mi (1.6 km)
- Max. width: 0.75 mi (1.21 km)
- Surface area: 250 acres (100 ha)
- Max. depth: 18 ft (5.5 m)
- Surface elevation: 1,168 ft (356 m)
- Islands: Lake Yankton Island

Lake Yankton, also called Cottonwood Lake, is an artificial lake that was originally part of the main channel of the Missouri River on the border of the U.S. States of Nebraska and South Dakota, near Yankton, South Dakota. The lake has an approximate surface area of 250 acres (100 ha) and has a maximum depth of 18 feet (5.5 m). The lake is located immediately downstream (east) of Gavins Point Dam and Lewis and Clark Lake, located just north of the current location of the main channel of the Missouri River.

== History ==
Originally the area now known as Lake Yankton was part of the main channel of the Missouri River. During the construction of Gavins Point Dam (1952-1957), the U.S. Army Corps of Engineers redirected the main channel of the Missouri south to its current location, just south of the Training Dike. The state line between Nebraska and South Dakota is located the mid-point of the original historical (at Nebraska Statehood) main channel. Therefore the lake is located in both Cedar County, Nebraska and Yankton County, South Dakota, even though it is widely incorrectly assumed that the lake is located entirely in South Dakota. Most of the northern and eastern portions of the lake and shoreline are in South Dakota, and most of the southern and western portions of the lake and shoreline are in Nebraska.

After dam construction completion a dike, called the Training Dike, was constructed by the Corps to "train" the river to its current location and flow, thus creating a land barrier separating Lake Yankton from the Missouri River. The lake was then impounded in order to control the lake level for fish and wildlife enhancement, along with recreational opportunities. The outlet from the lake known locally as "The Bubble" is a popular fishing spot, where the lake flows into the Missouri River. The lake is a public water managed by the U.S. Army Corps of Engineers, and fisheries are managed jointly between the Nebraska Game and Parks Commission and the South Dakota Department of Game, Fish, and Parks.

== Recreation and wildlife ==
Lake Yankton is a very popular public recreational and fishing lake with good populations of Largemouth Bass, Bluegill, Walleye, Black Crappie and Channel Catfish. There are two boat ramps for boat access to the lake, along with two kayak/canoe launches. There are also two fishing piers and two fishing jetties with handicapped fishing accesses.

=== No gasoline-motors restriction ===
The U.S. Army Corps of Engineers (USACE) placed an "electric-motors only" restriction on the lake in the 1980s due to its size and for environmental considerations. Therefore the use of gasoline-powered boat motors on the water is prohibited. This regulation is enforced by USACE Park Rangers, Conservation Officers and other law enforcement that may issue fine(s) to violators. This has led to the lake being very popular for swimming, kayaking, canoeing, paddleboarding and bird watching.

=== Public recreation areas ===
Four popular recreation areas surround the lake, two are managed by USACE: Cottonwood Recreation Area and Training Dike Recreation Area, and two are managed by South Dakota GFP : Chief White Crane Recreation Area and Pierson Ranch Recreation Area. Camping, hiking, biking, bird watching, fishing and hunting are popular activities around the lake. Lake Yankton Beach, located within Training Dike Day-Use Area is a popular swimming beach in summer months.

Lake Yankton Island is located within the lake and is approximately 120 acres (49 ha) in size. This Cottonwood-dominated island was originally a sandbar in the Missouri River. This wildlife management area is managed by the U.S. Army Corps of Engineers and is open to the public for wildlife watching and hunting. The island can be accessed by foot via Chief White Crane Recreation Area or the Gavins Point National Fish Hatchery.

=== 2011 Flood and fisheries restoration ===
During the 2011 Missouri River Floods the Missouri River water rose high enough that the river had backed into Lake Yankton, as a result the lake was infiltrated with Asian Carp, an aquatic invasive species not native to South Dakota/Nebraska that are well-established in the Missouri River below Gavins Point Dam. The lake fisheries and water quality began to decline. Therefore in 2014 a cooperative effort between the U.S. Army Corps of Engineers, the Nebraska Game and Parks Commission and the South Dakota Department of Game, Fish, and Parks completed a controlled fish kill to rid the lake of the invasive carp. Restocking efforts by the Nebraska Game and Parks Commission began following the fish kill. The kill was hailed as a success by agencies involved and the fisheries and water quality have increased to exceptionally good levels.

=== Further reading ===
- "Environmental Assessment for Lake Yankton Fish Population Renovation Project" By U.S. Army Corps of Engineers, Omaha District
- "The Restoration: Fish Kill done at Lake Yankton" - Yankton Press & Dakotan
- "Officials poison Lake Yankton to Kill Fish" - Argus Leader
- "Lake Yankton coming back to life after poisoning" - Omaha World Herald

== See also ==
- List of Nebraska lakes
- List of South Dakota lakes
