= West Bend Recreation Area =

State recreation area in South Dakota, United States

- Location within South Dakota
- Location: Hughes County, South Dakota, United States
- Coordinates: 44°10′15″N 99°43′16″W
- Area: 172.8 acres (69.9 ha)
- Administrator: South Dakota Department of Game, Fish and Parks
- Website: Official website

West Bend Recreation Area is a South Dakota State Recreation Area located along the shore of Lake Sharpe, a Missouri River Reservoir. The area is located in Hughes County. The park is open for year-round recreation including camping, horseback riding, biking, hiking and cross-country skiing.
