= Randall Creek Recreation Area =

State recreation area in South Dakota, United States

- Location within South Dakota
- Location: Gregory County, South Dakota, United States
- Coordinates: 43°03′04″N 98°33′19″W
- Area: 184 acres (74 ha)
- Established: 2002 (as state recreation area, previously U.S. Army Corps of Engineers-managed recreation area)
- Administrator: South Dakota Department of Game, Fish and Parks
- Website: Official website

Randall Creek Recreation Area is a South Dakota state recreation area in Gregory County, South Dakota in the United States. The recreation area is 184 acres (74 ha) and lies directly below Fort Randall Dam, along the banks of the Missouri River. The area is open for year-round recreation including camping, swimming, fishing, hiking and boating.

== See also ==
- Fort Randall
- List of South Dakota state parks
