= Roughlock Falls Nature Area =

Nature area in South Dakota, United States

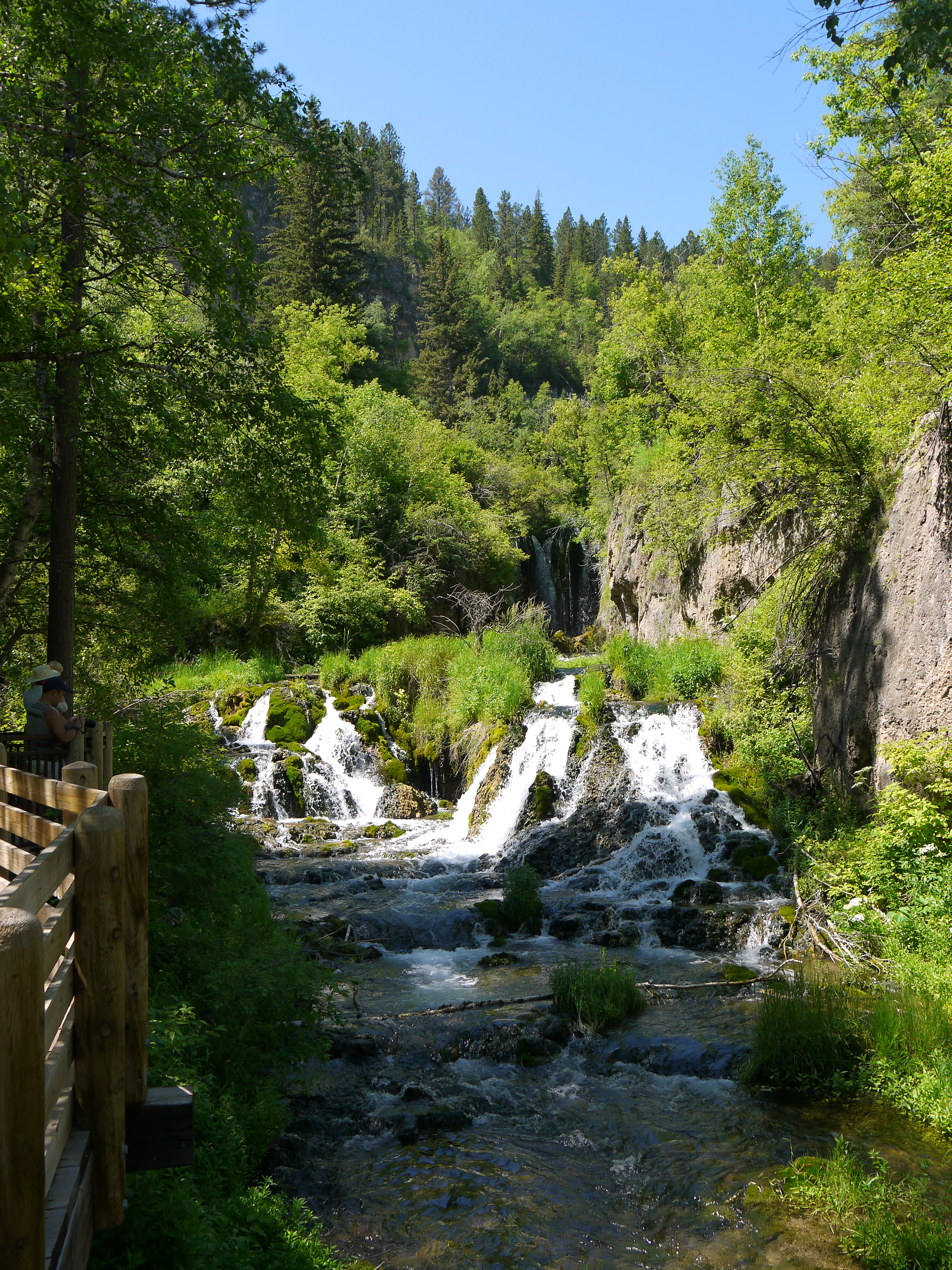
- Roughlock Falls in Little Spearfish Canyon

- Location within South Dakota
- Location: Lawrence, South Dakota, United States
- Coordinates: 44.349960°N 103.944300°W
- Established: 2008
- Governing body: South Dakota Department of Game, Fish, and Parks
- Website: Official website

Roughlock Falls Nature Area is a nature area in Lawrence County, South Dakota, in the United States. It is located in Spearfish Canyon, near Little Spearfish Creek, just before the creek joins Spearfish Creek, within the Black Hills National Forest. The area is managed by the South Dakota Department of Game, Fish, and Parks. Birdwatching, fishing, hiking, and snowmobiling are popular activities within this area. The area is about 15 miles (24 km) southwest of Spearfish or about 14.5 miles (23.3 km) west of Lead, just west of Spearfish Canyon Scenic Byway (U.S. 14A).

Wildlife found in the area include: Elk, Bald eagle, White-tailed deer, Mule deer, Coyote, Beaver, Bighorn sheep, Mountain goat, and Mountain lion.

== See also ==
- Spearfish Canyon
- Black Hills
- Black Hills Gold Rush
- Homestake Mine
