= Snake Creek Recreation Area =

State recreation area in South Dakota, United States

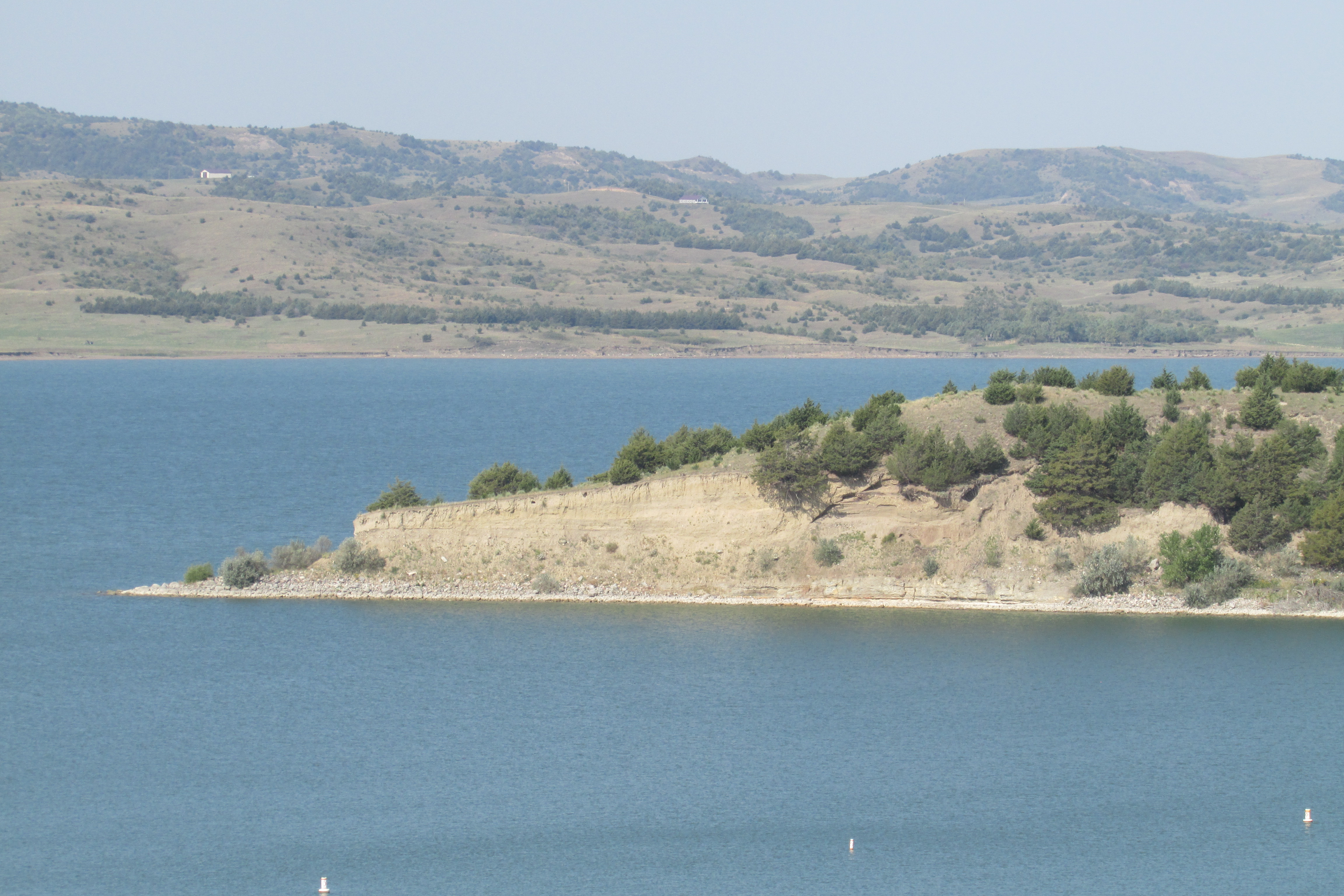

- Location within South Dakota
- Location: Charles Mix, South Dakota, United States
- Coordinates: 43.38998°N 99.11949°W
- Area: 695 acres (281 ha)
- Established: 1983
- Governing body: South Dakota Department of Game, Fish, and Parks
- Website: Snake Creek Recreation Area

Snake Creek Recreation Area is a South Dakota state recreation area in Charles Mix County, South Dakota in the United States. The recreation area is 695 acres (281 ha) and lies along the shores of Lake Francis Case, a reservoir on the Missouri River. The area is open for year-round recreation including camping, swimming, fishing, hiking and boating. There are 115 campsites, 10 camper cabins, and a full-service marina. The recreation area is 14 miles (23 km) west of Platte.

== See also ==
- Lake Francis Case
