= 1998 Montana Initiative 137 =

Referendum on mining

Montana Cyanide Process Open Pit Mining Prohibition Initiative (I-137)
- November 3, 1998
- Concerns mining

Results
Choice	Votes	%
Yes	169,991	52.30%
No	155,034	47.70%
Yes
60–70%
50–60%
No
70–80%
60–70%
50–60%

The Montana Cyanide Process Open Pit Mining Prohibition Initiative, also known as I-137, was a successful initiative on the November 3, 1998 ballot in Montana. It sought to prohibit "new open-pit gold and silver mines that used heap and vat cyanide leach processing".

== Text of measure ==
The text of the measure was as follows:

Cyanide leach mineral processing is the procedure used in mining operations that applies a cyanide-based solution over gold or silver ore to remove the precious metals from the waste rock, so the metals can be recovered. This measure would prohibit new open-pit gold and silver mines in Montana that use heap and vat cyanide leach processing. Any open-pit mines currently operating and permitted to use cyanide leach processing could continue to do so, but this measure would prohibit any expansion of these mines. If approved, this measure would be effective immediately. If approved, Montana would potentially lose taxes and royalties from new or expanded mining development. There would also be a potential reduction in the number of new mining jobs in Montana. However, the potential for state environmental liabilities may be reduced if cyanide leach mineral processing is eliminated.

== Support ==
The Montana Environmental Information Center (MEIC) was one of several non-profits who supported the measure, stating that it "was a response to the abysmal track record of open pit cyanide leach mining in Montana and the Montana Department of Environmental Quality's failure to adequately regulate such mines as required by state law."

== Results ==
The measure passed with 52.3% in support, making Montana the first state to prohibit such a mining practice.

In 2005, the Montana Supreme Court unanimously upheld the initiative.

The Montana State Legislature passed a bill in 2011 to amend the law, but it was vetoed by Governor Brian Schweitzer using a branding iron.

== See also ==
- Gold cyanidation ban
