= Pierson Ranch Recreation Area =

State recreation area in South Dakota, United States

- Location within South Dakota
- Location: Yankton County, South Dakota, United States
- Coordinates: 42°52′25″N 97°28′56″W
- Area: 60 acres (24 ha)
- Established: 1959 (as Corps recreation area); 2001 (as state recreation area)
- Administrator: South Dakota Department of Game, Fish and Parks
- Website: Official website

Pierson Ranch Recreation Area is a state recreation area in Yankton County, South Dakota in the United States. The recreation area is 60 acres (24 ha) and lies directly below Gavins Point Dam and Lewis and Clark Lake and is adjacent to Lake Yankton. The area is open for year-round recreation including camping, swimming, fishing, hiking and boating. It is 4 miles (6.4 km) west of Yankton.

== History ==
The campground was the first one constructed by the U.S. Army Corps of Engineers in 1959 following construction of the nearby Gavins Point Dam. In 2001, legislation transferred management of the recreation area from the Army Corps of Engineers to the South Dakota Department of Game, Fish and Parks under terms of a lease in perpetuity.
