= Brooklyn Township, Lincoln County, South Dakota =

Township in Lincoln County, South Dakota

Coordinates: 43°07′12″N 96°51′18″W

Brooklyn Township is a township in Lincoln County, South Dakota, United States, in the Sioux Falls metropolitan area. Its population was 233 at the 2000 census.

Located in the southwestern corner of Lincoln County, Brooklyn Township borders the following other townships:

- Delaware Township — north
- Lincoln Township — northeastern corner
- Pleasant Township — east
- Prairie Township, Union County — southeastern corner
- Glenwood Township, Clay County — south
- Riverside Township, Clay County — southwestern corner
- Centerville Township, Turner County — west
- Turner Township, Turner County — northwestern corner
