= Fisher Grove State Park =

State park in South Dakota, United States

- Location within South Dakota
- Location: Spink County, South Dakota, United States
- Coordinates: 44°53′00″N 98°21′17″W
- Established: 1946
- Operator: Fisher Grove Country Club
- Named for: Frank I. Fisher
- Website: Official website

Fisher Grove State Park is a public recreation area located on the James River, eight miles (13 km) east of Redfield in Spink County, South Dakota, United States. The state park is named for Frank I. Fisher, the first permanent European settler in Spink County. The park offers camping, swimming, fishing, hiking and canoeing. It is managed and maintained by the Fisher Grove Country Club, which also manages a ten-hole golf course adjacent to the park.

== See also ==
- List of South Dakota state parks
