= Fairview, South Dakota =

- Town
- Location in Lincoln County and the state of South Dakota
- Coordinates: 43°13′19″N 96°29′15″W
- Country: United States
- State: South Dakota
- County: Lincoln
- Founded: 1886

Area
  - Total: 0.085 sq mi (0.22 km^{2})
  - Land: 0.085 sq mi (0.22 km^{2})
  - Water: 0 sq mi (0.00 km^{2})
- Elevation: 1,234 ft (376 m)

Population (2020)
  - Total: 61
  - Density: 713.6/sq mi (275.54/km^{2})
- Time zone: UTC-6 (Central (CST))
  - Summer (DST): UTC-5 (CDT)
- ZIP code: 57027
- Area code: 605
- FIPS code: 46-20780
- GNIS feature ID: 1267387

Fairview is a town in Lincoln County, South Dakota, United States. The population was 61 at the 2020 census.

Fairview was laid out in 1886, and named for the scenic valley setting of the site.

== Geography ==
Fairview is located along the Big Sioux River.

According to the United States Census Bureau, the town has a total area of 0.09 square miles (0.23 km^{2}), all land.

== Demographics ==
Historical population
Census	Pop.	Note	%±
1910	107		—
1920	174		62.6%
1930	156		−10.3%
1940	150		−3.8%
1950	155		3.3%
1960	101		−34.8%
1970	72		−28.7%
1980	90		25.0%
1990	73		−18.9%
2000	94		28.8%
2010	60		−36.2%
2020	61		1.7%
U.S. Decennial Census; 2015 Estimate

=== 2010 census ===
As of the census of 2010, there were 60 people, 27 households, and 18 families residing in the town. The population density was 666.7 inhabitants per square mile (257.4/km^{2}). There were 31 housing units at an average density of 344.4 per square mile (133.0/km^{2}). The racial makeup of the town was 100.0% White.

There were 27 households, of which 29.6% had children under the age of 18 living with them, 55.6% were married couples living together, 3.7% had a female householder with no husband present, 7.4% had a male householder with no wife present, and 33.3% were non-families. 29.6% of all households were made up of individuals, and 18.5% had someone living alone who was 65 years of age or older. The average household size was 2.22 and the average family size was 2.67.

The median age in the town was 46 years. 18.3% of residents were under the age of 18; 11.8% were between the ages of 18 and 24; 16.6% were from 25 to 44; 28.3% were from 45 to 64; and 25% were 65 years of age or older. The gender makeup of the town was 55.0% male and 45.0% female.

=== 2000 census ===
As of the census of 2000, there were 94 people, 31 households, and 23 families residing in the town. The population density was 886.1 inhabitants per square mile (342.1/km^{2}). There were 34 housing units at an average density of 320.5 per square mile (123.7/km^{2}). The racial makeup of the town was 96.81% White, 2.13% Native American, and 1.06% from two or more races.

There were 31 households, out of which 41.9% had children under the age of 18 living with them, 71.0% were married couples living together, and 22.6% were non-families. 19.4% of all households were made up of individuals, and 3.2% had someone living alone who was 65 years of age or older. The average household size was 3.03 and the average family size was 3.38.

In the town, the population was spread out, with 33.0% under the age of 18, 8.5% from 18 to 24, 28.7% from 25 to 44, 21.3% from 45 to 64, and 8.5% who were 65 years of age or older. The median age was 31 years. For every 100 females, there were 88.0 males. For every 100 females age 18 and over, there were 96.9 males.

The median income for a household in the town was $29,063, and the median income for a family was $28,750. Males had a median income of $25,625 versus $21,250 for females. The per capita income for the town was $14,471. There were no families and 9.2% of the population living below the poverty line, including no under eighteens and 22.2% of those over 64.
