= Sica Hollow State Park =

State park in South Dakota, United States

- Location within South Dakota
- Location: Roberts and Marshall counties, South Dakota, United States
- Coordinates: 45°44′32″N 97°14′34″W
- Elevation: 1,247 ft (380 m)
- Established: 1968
- Administrator: South Dakota Department of Game, Fish and Parks
- Website: Official website

Sica Hollow State Park (also Sieche Hollow State Park) is a public recreation area located 15 miles northwest of Sisseton, South Dakota, United States. The state park was named Sica (pronounced shee-chah), a Dakota word for bad or evil, due to the iron-red tinted water which was seen as blood by the Dakota tribe in the area.

In 1967, Sica Hollow was designated as a National Natural Landmark by the National Park Service.

== The Legend of Sica Hollow ==
Sica Hollow once protected many peaceful Indian camps. Its trees blocked the North Wind. But, a stranger named Hand came. He scared the females of the tribe. The old men said he would leave come spring.

However Hand did not leave when expected. Instead he taught the young boys to strike and kill. The old men sought help from Wicasa Wakan (wee-cha-sha wah-kahn), Medicine Man. They wanted to know what should be sacrificed to make the Hollow as it was.

Wicasa Wakan returned to his lodge and waited for Wakantanka (wah-kahn-tahn-kah), the Great Spirit, to reply. Soon Wakantanka sent his messenger, Thunderer. Thunderer's eyes flashed. His dark wings beat the air, and he brought a cloud that rained over the Hollow. Madness seized Hand. He tried to run, but vines encircled his ankles. The water filled his screaming mouth. Thunderer's talons ripped out his eyes so he would never see the Happy Hunting Ground.

Of all the people in the Hollow, only a raven-haired maiden called Fawn was saved from the rising water. She fled to the top of the highest hill and sang her grief and remorse to the Great Spirit. Then she slept many days. When she awoke, the Hollow was clean and bright. Yet the memory and the evil name linger.
