= Lincoln County, South Dakota =

County in South Dakota, United States

- County
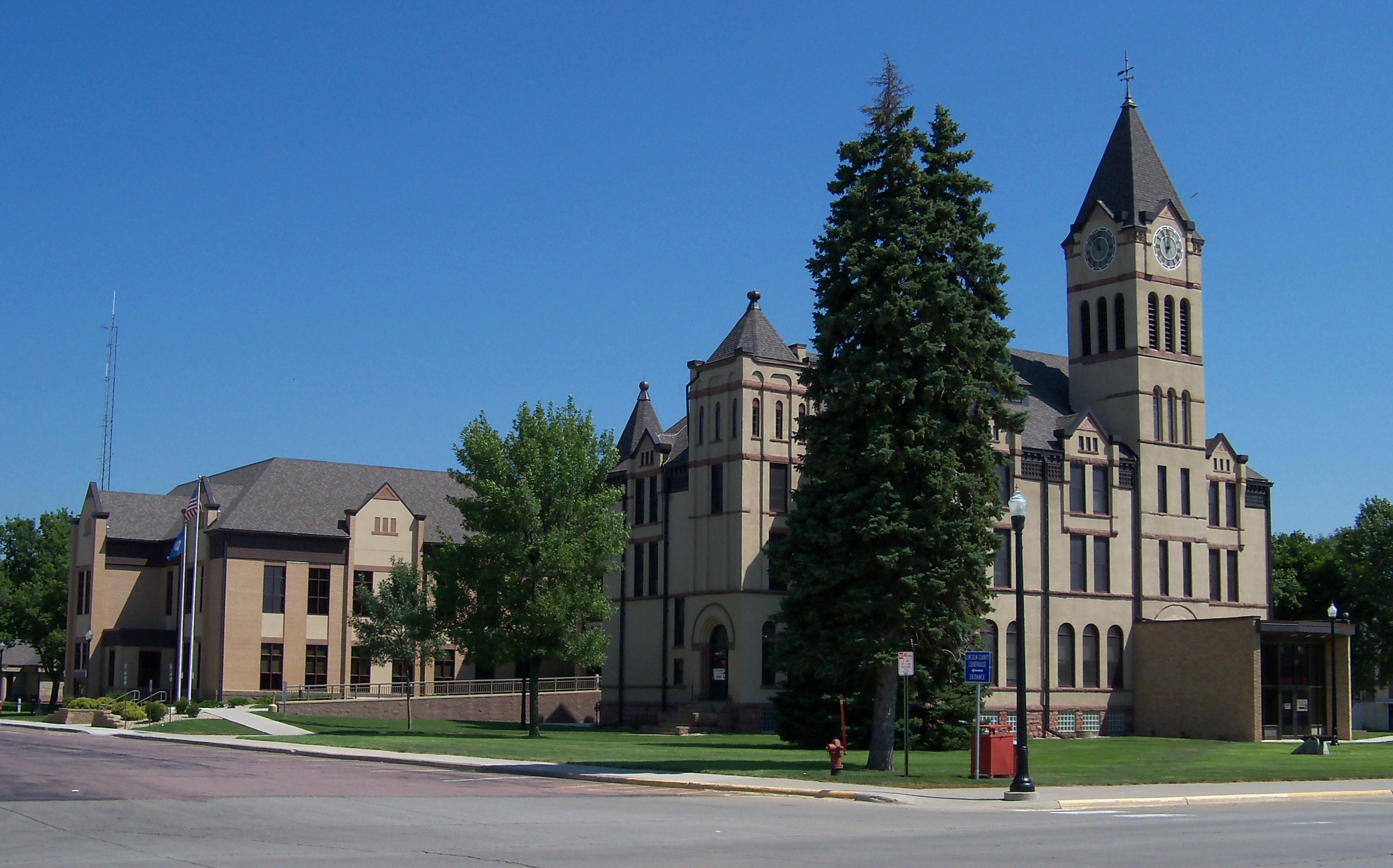
- Lincoln County Courthouse in Canton

- Location within the U.S. state of South Dakota
- Coordinates: 43°17′N 96°43′W
- Country: United States
- State: South Dakota
- Founded: December 30, 1867
- Named for: Abraham Lincoln
- Seat: Canton
- Largest city: Sioux Falls

Area
  - Total: 578 sq mi (1,500 km^{2})
  - Land: 577 sq mi (1,490 km^{2})
  - Water: 0.5 sq mi (1.3 km^{2}) 0.08%

Population (2020)
  - Total: 65,161
  - Estimate (2025): 77,145 ▲
  - Density: 113/sq mi (43.6/km^{2})
- Time zone: UTC−6 (Central)
  - Summer (DST): UTC−5 (CDT)
- Congressional district: At-large
- Website: lincolncountysd.gov

Lincoln County is a county in the U.S. state of South Dakota. As of the 2020 census, the population was 65,161, making it the third most populous county in South Dakota. Its county seat is Canton. The county was named for Abraham Lincoln, 16th President of the United States. Lincoln County is included in the Sioux Falls Metropolitan Statistical Area. It is one of the top 10 fastest-growing counties in the United States in terms of rate of population increase, rate of housing unit increase, and many other factors. This is due to the southward growth of Sioux Falls, and the expansion of its suburbs.

== Geography ==
The Big Sioux River flows south-southeastward along the east line of Lincoln County. Lincoln County is on the eastern line of South Dakota. Its east boundary line abuts the west boundary line of the state of Iowa (across the river).

The county terrain consists of low rolling hills. The county area is largely devoted to agriculture. The terrain slopes to the southeast, and drops off to the river valley along its east edge. The county has a total area of 578 square miles (1,500 km^{2}), of which 577 square miles (1,490 km^{2}) is land and 0.5 square miles (1.3 km^{2}) (0.08%) is water.

=== Lakes ===
- Lake Alvin
- Lake Lakota

=== Protected areas ===
- Atkins Waterfowl Production Area
- Fish State Game Production Area
- Good Earth State Park
- Johnson State Game Production Area
- Klondike State Game Production Area
- Lake Alvin State Game Production Area
- Lake Alvin State Recreation Area
- McKee State Game Production Area
- Newton Hills State Park
- Nine Mile Creek State Game Production Area
- Oak Ridge State Game Production Area
- Pattee Lake State Game Production Area
- Rolling State Game Production Area
- Watershed Lake State Game Production Area
- Worthing State Game Production Area

=== Major highways ===
- Interstate 29
- Interstate 229
- U.S. Highway 18
- South Dakota Highway 11
- South Dakota Highway 17
- South Dakota Highway 44
- South Dakota Highway 46
- South Dakota Highway 115

=== Adjacent counties ===
- Minnehaha County – north
- Lyon County, Iowa – northeast
- Sioux County, Iowa – southeast
- Union County – south
- Clay County – southwest
- Turner County – west

== Demographics ==
Historical population
Census	Pop.	Note	%±
1870	712		—
1880	5,896		728.1%
1890	9,148		55.2%
1900	12,161		32.9%
1910	12,712		4.5%
1920	13,893		9.3%
1930	13,918		0.2%
1940	13,171		−5.4%
1950	12,767		−3.1%
1960	12,371		−3.1%
1970	11,761		−4.9%
1980	13,942		18.5%
1990	15,427		10.7%
2000	24,131		56.4%
2010	44,828		85.8%
2020	65,161		45.4%
2025 (est.)	77,145	▲	18.4%
U.S. Decennial Census; 1790–1960 1900–1990; 1990–2000 2010–2020

=== 2020 census ===
As of the 2020 census, there were 65,161 people, 24,877 households, and 17,239 families residing in the county. The population density was 112.9 inhabitants per square mile (43.6/km^{2}). Of the residents, 28.2% were under the age of 18 and 13.1% were 65 years of age or older; the median age was 35.0 years. For every 100 females there were 97.0 males, and for every 100 females age 18 and over there were 94.2 males.

The racial makeup of the county was 90.5% White, 1.7% Black or African American, 0.7% American Indian and Alaska Native, 1.5% Asian, 1.0% from some other race, and 4.5% from two or more races. Hispanic or Latino residents of any race comprised 2.6% of the population.

Of the 24,877 households, 36.8% had children under the age of 18 living with them and 21.3% had a female householder with no spouse or partner present. About 23.9% of all households were made up of individuals and 8.2% had someone living alone who was 65 years of age or older.

There were 26,227 housing units, of which 5.1% were vacant. Among occupied housing units, 71.7% were owner-occupied and 28.3% were renter-occupied. The homeowner vacancy rate was 1.5% and the rental vacancy rate was 8.5%.

=== 2010 census ===
As of the 2010 census, there were 44,828 people, 16,649 households, and 12,287 families in the county. The population density was 77.7 inhabitants per square mile (30.0/km^{2}). There were 17,875 housing units at an average density of 31.0 per square mile (12.0/km^{2}). The racial makeup of the county was 96.1% white, 1.0% Asian, 0.7% black or African American, 0.5% American Indian, 0.3% from other races, and 1.4% from two or more races. Those of Hispanic or Latino origin made up 1.2% of the population. In terms of ancestry, 47.1% were German, 20.9% were Norwegian, 11.7% were Irish, 7.2% were Dutch, 5.2% were English, and 3.9% were American.

Of the 16,649 households, 41.0% had children under the age of 18 living with them, 63.3% were married couples living together, 7.3% had a female householder with no husband present, 26.2% were non-families, and 20.2% of all households were made up of individuals. The average household size was 2.68 and the average family size was 3.11. The median age was 32.8 years.

The median income for a household in the county was $67,365 and the median income for a family was $75,231. Males had a median income of $43,537 versus $34,715 for females. The per capita income for the county was $33,261. About 2.7% of families and 4.3% of the population were below the poverty line, including 4.9% of those under age 18 and 7.5% of those age 65 or over.

== Communities ==
=== Cities ===
- Beresford (partial)
- Canton (county seat)
- Harrisburg
- Lennox
- Sioux Falls (partial)
- Tea
- Worthing

=== Towns ===
- Fairview
- Hudson

=== Census-designated place ===
- Shindler

=== Unincorporated communities ===
- Naomi (partial)
- Norway Center

=== Townships ===
- Brooklyn
- Canton
- Dayton
- Delapre
- Delaware
- Eden
- Grant
- Fairview
- Highland
- La Valley
- Lincoln
- Lynn
- Norway
- Perry
- Pleasant
- Springdale

== Politics ==
Lincoln County voters have been reliably Republican for decades. In no national election since 1964 has the county selected a Democratic Party candidate. Only three times in its history has it voted for a different party, twice for the Democratic Party and once for the Progressive Party. In 1924 the county voted for independent candidate LaFollete who was nominated by the progressive party but ran without a label in South Dakota.

United States presidential election results for Lincoln County, South Dakota
Year	Republican		Democratic		Third party(ies)	
Year	No.	%	No.	%	No.	%
1892	1,130	55.53%	206	10.12%	699	34.35%
1896	1,516	51.86%	1,393	47.66%	14	0.48%
1900	1,908	59.96%	1,226	38.53%	48	1.51%
1904	2,471	80.49%	378	12.31%	221	7.20%
1908	1,887	69.40%	699	25.71%	133	4.89%
1912	0	0.00%	719	28.52%	1,802	71.48%
1916	1,591	60.29%	936	35.47%	112	4.24%
1920	2,790	73.54%	441	11.62%	563	14.84%
1924	1,825	43.81%	265	6.36%	2,076	49.83%
1928	3,463	71.40%	1,364	28.12%	23	0.47%
1932	2,160	38.85%	3,300	59.35%	100	1.80%
1936	2,918	48.42%	2,541	42.17%	567	9.41%
1940	4,081	66.59%	2,048	33.41%	0	0.00%
1944	3,298	66.99%	1,625	33.01%	0	0.00%
1948	2,771	59.51%	1,826	39.22%	59	1.27%
1952	4,387	78.35%	1,212	21.65%	0	0.00%
1956	3,529	62.24%	2,141	37.76%	0	0.00%
1960	3,553	64.16%	1,985	35.84%	0	0.00%
1964	2,740	49.14%	2,836	50.86%	0	0.00%
1968	3,259	59.89%	1,961	36.03%	222	4.08%
1972	3,201	54.92%	2,617	44.90%	10	0.17%
1976	3,105	51.04%	2,957	48.60%	22	0.36%
1980	3,848	57.45%	2,261	33.76%	589	8.79%
1984	3,988	60.10%	2,626	39.57%	22	0.33%
1988	3,537	52.35%	3,190	47.21%	30	0.44%
1992	3,365	42.47%	2,943	37.15%	1,615	20.38%
1996	4,201	48.92%	3,643	42.42%	743	8.65%
2000	6,546	62.01%	3,844	36.42%	166	1.57%
2004	11,161	65.40%	5,703	33.42%	202	1.18%
2008	11,803	56.84%	8,642	41.61%	322	1.55%
2012	13,611	62.00%	7,982	36.36%	359	1.64%
2016	15,499	61.43%	8,076	32.01%	1,656	6.56%
2020	19,617	60.55%	11,981	36.98%	798	2.46%
2024	22,621	62.16%	12,981	35.67%	791	2.17%

== Education ==
School districts include:

- Alcester-Hudson School District 61-1
- Beresford School District 61-2
- Canton School District 41-1
- Centerville School District 60-1
- Harrisburg School District
- Lennox School District 41-4
- Sioux Falls School District 49-5
- Tea Area School District

== See also ==
- National Register of Historic Places listings in Lincoln County, South Dakota
