= Shadehill Reservoir =

- Location within South Dakota Location within the United States
- Location: Perkins County, South Dakota
- Coordinates: 45°45′09″N 102°12′07″W
- Type: artificial lake
- Primary inflows: North Fork Grand River, South Fork Grand River Lodgepole Creek
- Primary outflows: Grand River
- Catchment area: 2,176,000 acres (8,810 km^{2})
- Basin countries: United States
- Surface area: 4,693 acres (18.99 km^{2})
- Max. depth: 62 ft (19 m)
- Water volume: 121,483 acre⋅ft (0.149847 km^{3})
- Surface elevation: 2,287 ft (697 m)

Shadehill Reservoir is a reservoir on the Grand River in Perkins County, South Dakota, USA. The lake was created by the construction of Shadehill Dam by the United States Bureau of Reclamation in 1951.

The reservoir has two primary inflows: North Fork Grand River and South Fork Grand River. The single Grand River serves as the only outflow.

Species of fish in the lake include walleye, smallmouth bass, channel catfish, yellow perch, northern pike, and common carp.

Shadehill Reservoir is the location of the Shadehill Recreation Area. Also nearby is the smaller Llewellyn Johns Recreation Area, with both managed by the South Dakota Department of Game, Fish, and Parks. The recreation area includes facilities for camping, swimming, picnicking and boating.

Also, located around the reservoir is the Hugh Glass Lakeside Use Area, named for the mountain man, Hugh Glass, which is also operated by the Game, Fish, and Parks as a free campground, boat launch and picnic area. A historical monument to Hugh Glass stands near the site of his mauling on the southern shore of Shadehill Reservoir, at the forks of the Grand River.

== See also ==
- List of lakes in South Dakota
- Hugh Glass, American frontiersman, fur trapper and trader, hunter, and explorer.
