= Pease Creek =

Stream in South Dakota, United States

Coordinates: 43°08′15″N 98°44′35″W

Pease Creek is a stream in South Dakota. It is named after F. D. Pease, an early settler and later territorial politician.

== See also ==
- List of rivers of South Dakota
