= Lake Alvin =

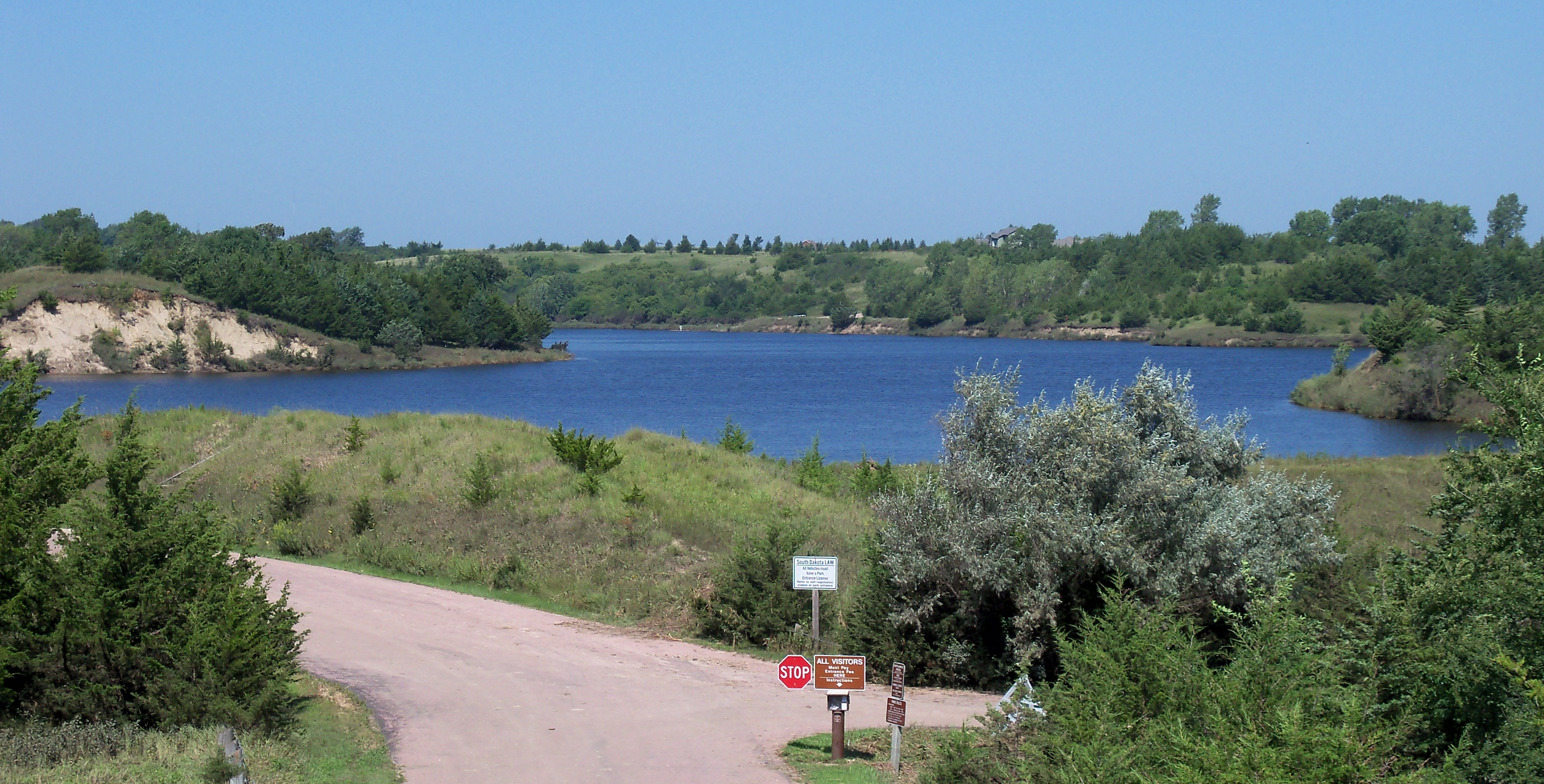
- Eastern portion of Lake Alvin

- Location within South Dakota Location within the United States
- Location: Lincoln County, South Dakota
- Coordinates: 43°26′27″N 096°36′40″W
- Type: artificial lake
- Primary inflows: Nine Mile Creek
- Primary outflows: Nine Mile Creek
- Basin countries: United States
- Surface elevation: 1,273 ft (388 m)

Lake Alvin is an artificial lake in Lincoln County, South Dakota between Harrisburg, South Dakota and Granite, Iowa. The lake is formed by a dam on Nine Mile Creek just before it enters the Big Sioux River, east of Harrisburg. It is part of a 59-acre (240,000 m^{2}) recreational area.

== History ==
Lake Alvin has always been a popular swimming location for those looking for a mid-sized beach. However, in 2005, the South Dakota GFP closed the swimming beach to the public due to high levels of coliform bacteria in the lake. A shutdown was again issued in 2009, 2013, 2014, and 2020 due to high levels of coliform bacteria.
