= Cottonwood Recreation Area (Nebraska) =

Public recreation area in Cedar County, Nebraska, USA

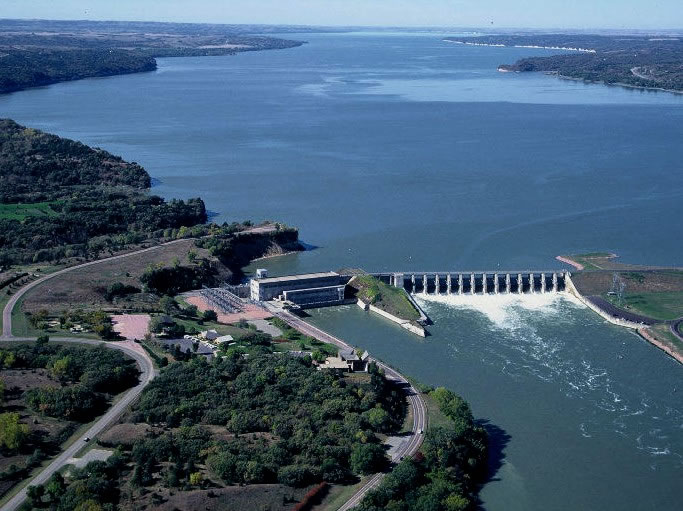
- Cottonwood Recreation Area is located directly below Gavins Point Dam.

- Location within Nebraska Location within the United States
- Location: Cedar County, Nebraska, United States
- Nearest city: Yankton, South Dakota
- Coordinates: 42.860802°N 97.482453°W
- Area: 42 acres (17 ha)
- Governing body: U.S. Army Corps of Engineers
- Website: U.S. Army Corps of Engineers - Gavins Point Project

Cottonwood Recreation Area is a public recreation area located in Cedar County, Nebraska, U.S. It is located about 5 miles (8.0 km) west of Yankton and located on the shores of Lake Yankton. The recreation area is located immediately downstream of Gavins Point Dam and Lewis and Clark Lake. It is named for Cottonwood Island, an original island located in the Missouri River, for the large number of cottonwood trees that dominate the area. The recreation area is owned and managed by the U.S. Army Corps of Engineers.

Although the area is located north of the Missouri River, it is often incorrectly assumed the area is a part of South Dakota. The original main channel of the Missouri River is now what is Lake Yankton, and upon Nebraska Statehood the original midpoint of the main channel of the Missouri River was determined to be the state line. Since Cottonwood Recreation Area is located south and west of Lake Yankton, it is actually entirely within Nebraska. The river was relocated to its present location following the construction of Gavins Point Dam.

== Recreational opportunities ==
Cottonwood Recreation area is popular for camping, disc golf, picnicking, fishing, bird watching, and access to Lake Yankton. Typically this lake is less busy and more quiet than Lewis and Clark Lake, located just upstream of the dam. There are 77 campsites with electric hook-ups available.
