= Shadehill Dam =

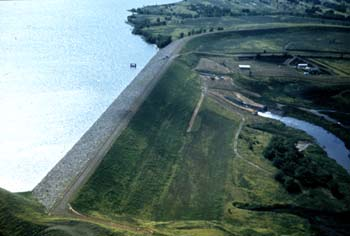
- Shadehill Dam and Reservoir

- Location within South Dakota
- Country: United States
- Location: Perkins County in northwestern South Dakota
- Coordinates: 45.752534°N 102.202283°W
- Status: Operational
- Opening date: 1951
- Owner: United States Bureau of Reclamation

Dam and spillways
- Type of dam: Embankment
- Impounds: Grand River
- Height: 145 ft (44 m)
- Length: 12,843 ft (3,915 m)
- Elevation at crest: 2,318 ft (707 m) above msl

Reservoir
- Creates: Shadehill Reservoir
- Total capacity: 468,585 acre⋅ft (0.577991 km^{3}) (Maximum Pool)
- Active capacity: 81,443 acre⋅ft (0.100458 km^{3}) (Normal Pool)
- Catchment area: 3,120 square miles (8,100 km2)
- Surface area: 12,150 acres (49 km^{2})
- Website; Shadehill Dam - USBR

Shadehill Dam is a dam (constructed 1951) on the Grand River in Perkins County in northwestern South Dakota in the United States, about 10 miles (16 km) south of Lemmon. The dam and its impoundment, Shadehill Reservoir, serve mainly for flood and silt control, wildlife conservation and recreation. Located directly below the confluence of the North and South Forks of the Grand River, the dam is operated by the U.S. Bureau of Reclamation, and is part of the Shadehill Unit of the Pick-Sloan Missouri Basin Program.

The dam is an embankment structure 145 feet (44 m) high and 12,843 feet (3,915 m) long, with an elevation of 2,318 feet (707 m) at the crest. A catchment area of 3,120 square miles (8,100 km^{2}) lies above the dam site. At full pool, the reservoir has a capacity of 468,585 acre-feet (0.577991 km^{3}), with a surface area of 12,150 acres (4,920 ha). Normal conservation water levels are much lower, at 81,443 acre-feet (0.100458 km^{3}). Regular water discharges pass through an outlet works with a capacity of 600 cu ft/s (17 m^{3}/s), while flood flows are released through two spillways: a morning glory inlet with a capacity of 5,700 cu ft/s (160 m^{3}/s), and an emergency overflow channel that can pass up to 127,000 cu ft/s (3,600 m^{3}/s).

Shadehill Dam was originally intended to serve irrigation purposes as well, but after determining that the water in the reservoir was too saline the Bureau of Reclamation dropped this phase from the project.

== See also ==
- List of dams in the Missouri River watershed
- Pick-Sloan Plan
- List of dams and reservoirs in South Dakota
