= Sweet Betsey Gulch =

Valley in South Dakota

Coordinates: 44°18′48″N 103°52′43″W

Sweet Betsey Gulch is a valley in the U.S. state of South Dakota.

Sweet Betsey Gulch was named after a local mine.
