= Spearfish Canyon =

Gorge in South Dakota, United States

Coordinates: 44.47750°N 103.85020°W

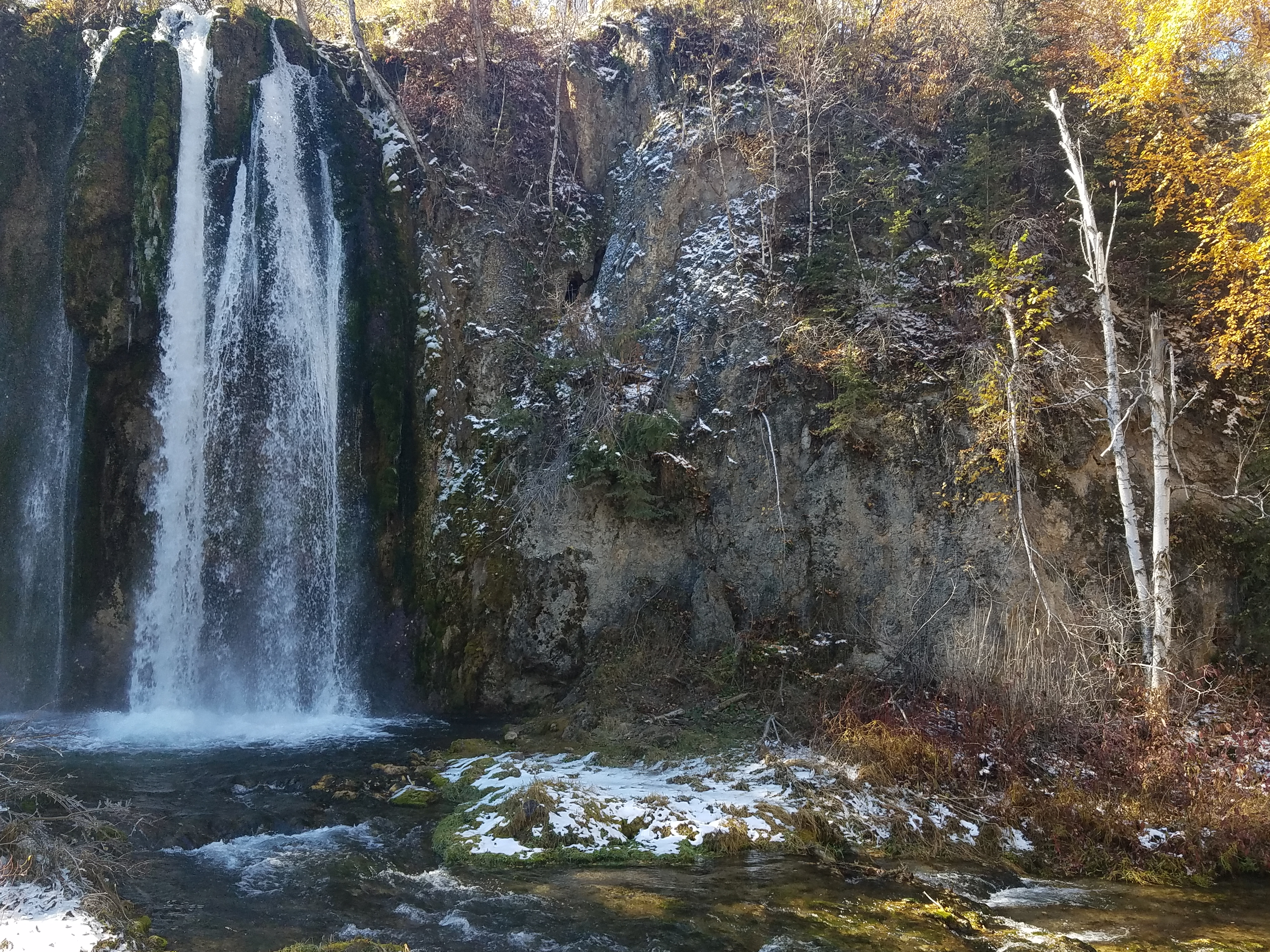
Spearfish Falls in Spearfish Canyon

Spearfish Canyon Scenic Byway, along U.S. Route 14A

Spearfish Canyon is a deep but narrow gorge carved by Spearfish Creek located in Lawrence County, South Dakota, U.S., just south of Spearfish. The canyon is located within the Black Hills, located on the northern edge of the Black Hills National Forest. The Spearfish Canyon Scenic Byway travels through the Canyon from Spearfish to Cheyenne Crossing along U.S. Route 14A. The highway follows an old railroad grade that was abandoned after massive flooding in 1933.

== Natural history ==
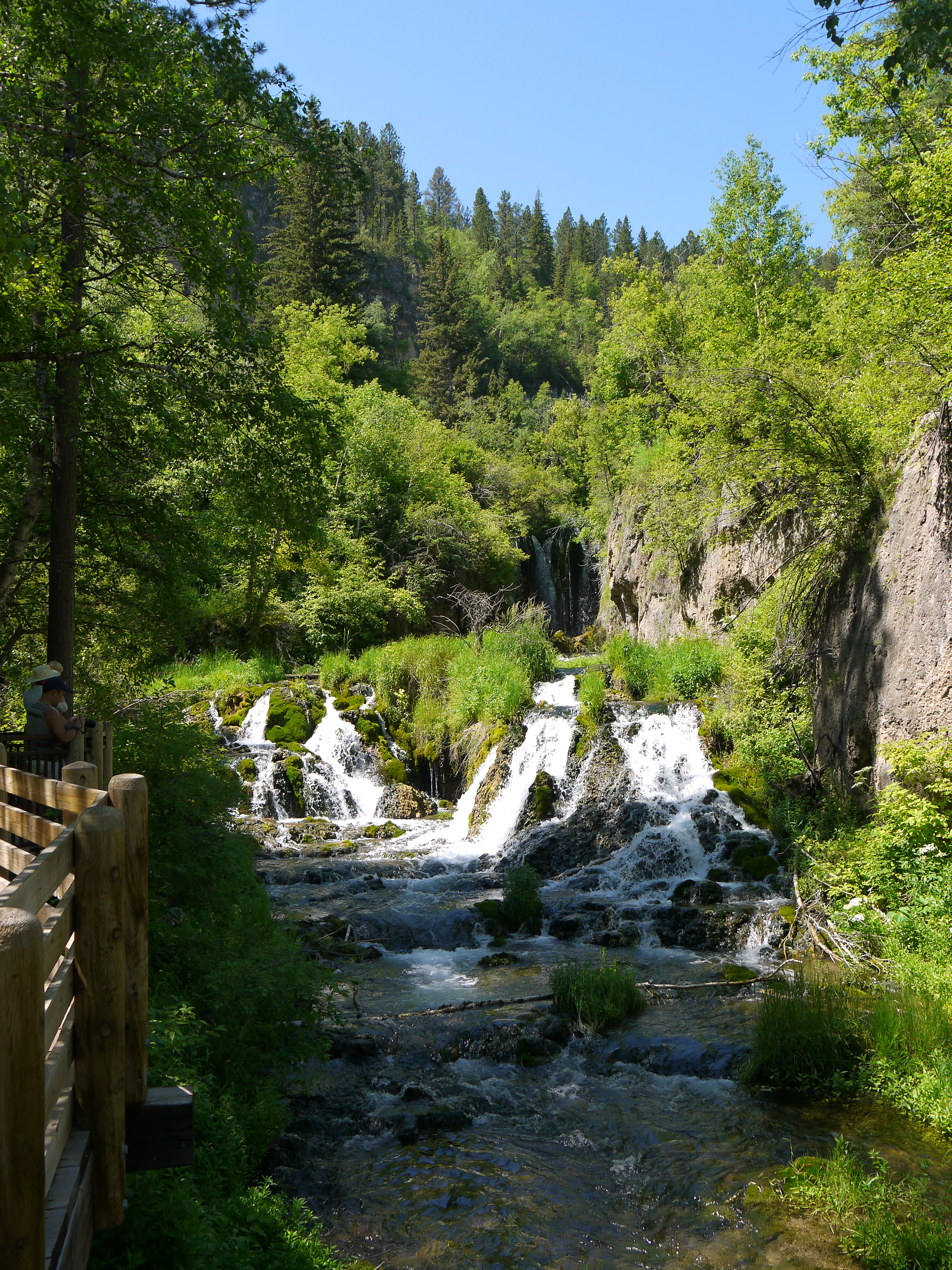
Roughlock Falls Nature Area

Approximately 600 million years ago in the Precambrian, the area was covered by a sea. As waters subsided and land masses began to appear 60 to 30 million years ago (between the Paleocene and Oligocene epochs), drainages such as Spearfish Canyon formed as softer rock was eroded away. Today, a National Scenic Byway, U.S. Route 14A, winds through the canyon. This area is truly a crossroads, as trees and plants from the Rocky Mountains, eastern woodlands, northern forests, and the Great Plains areas can be found here.

== Flora and fauna ==
Of the 1,585 plant species found in South Dakota, 1,260 species are in the Black Hills, many of which can be found in Spearfish Canyon. Ponderosa pines are the most prominent vegetation in the Black Hills. As for bird species, turkeys, bluejays, woodpeckers, cliff swallows, chickadees, and golden or bald eagles are seen in the area. The canyon supports a cross-section of four-footed animal life. White-tail and mule deer can be found throughout the drive. Porcupines, raccoons, squirrels, and chipmunks might be spotted as well as a bobcat or a yellow-bellied marmot. Mountain Goats were introduced into the Black Hills in the 1920's, and are commonly seen in the section of Spearfish Canyon near the Bridal Veil Falls.

The Pahasapa, or Black Hills, Mountain Snail (Oreohelix cooperi) is a small, terrestrial snail species endemic to the Black Hills, including the Spearfish Canyon. The species is rare, and in decline due to habitat degradation.

== Geology ==
The Spearfish Canyon region is often studied by geologists due to the extreme old age of the Precambrian rocks exposed by the creek bed. The canyon's high walls are of three dominant rock types. The Cambrian to Ordovician Deadwood Shale at the bottom lies on an unconformity above Precambrian rock and can be identified by its brown color. It is multi-layered in appearance and ranges from 10 feet (3.0 m) to 400 feet (120 m) thick. Englewood Limestone in the middle is pink to red colored and is 30 feet (9.1 m) to 60 feet (18 m) thick. The Paleogene Paha Sapa Limestone, the top layer, is the thickest (300 feet (91 m) to 600 feet (180 m)) and is buff-colored and weathered gray in appearance. Caves and fossils are frequently found in the Paha Sapa Limestone.

== See also ==
- Black Hills Gold Rush
- Homestake Mine (South Dakota)
- Peter Norbeck Scenic Byway
- Roughlock Falls Nature Area
- Sweet Betsey Gulch, left-bank dry tributary valley
