= Palisades State Park =

State park in South Dakota, United States

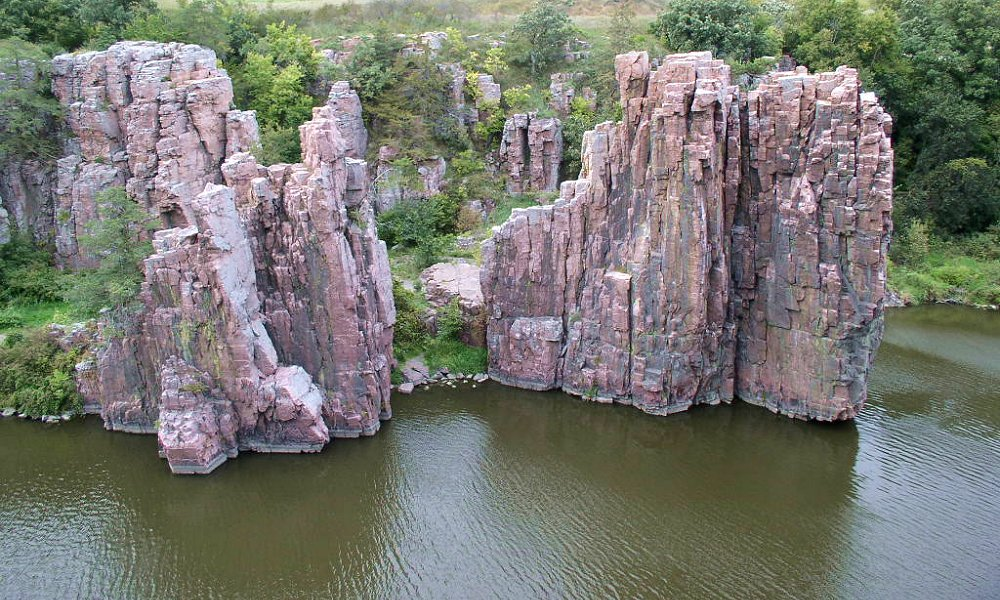
- King and Queen Rock in Palisades State Park

- Location within South Dakota
- Location: Minnehaha County, South Dakota, United States
- Nearest town: Garretson, South Dakota
- Coordinates: 43°41′16″N 96°31′02″W
- Area: 435 acres (176 ha)
- Established: 1972
- Administrator: South Dakota Department of Game, Fish and Parks
- Website: Official website

Palisades State Park is a state park of South Dakota, United States, featuring cliffs and rock formations eroded out of pink Sioux Quartzite. The park is located just south of Garretson, 10 miles (16 km) off Interstate 90. At only 435 acres (176 ha), it is South Dakota's second-smallest state park.

== Natural history ==
The Sioux Quartzite rocks are 1.2 billion years old and up to 50 feet (15 m) high. They are exposed on either side of Split Rock Creek, which also flows through Split Rock Creek State Park in Minnesota. Within the quartzite are deposits of catlinite, a softer mineral essential to many Native American groups to make ceremonial pipes. The park lies on the Coteau des Prairies, a plateau on the northern Great Plains.

The state Game, Fish, and Parks Department had acquired the land by 1947, when plans were reported for a picnic shelter and improvements to the entrance road. In July 1970 it was announced that the site would become a state park of about 100 acres, with a paved road, a new parking lot, and a campground.

In 2019, Game, Fish, and Parks and the South Dakota Parks and Wildlife Foundation announced an expansion project. The Foundation bought land to the west side of the park and gifted it to the state. The project grew the park from 167 acres to 435 acres, increased the amount of campsites from 34 to 110, and added two picnic shelters, an archery range, and a disc golf course.

== Cultural history ==
Pioneers settled in the area beginning in 1865. In the 1870s, Split Rock Creek was harnessed to power a large flour and feed mill, and a town called Palisades formed around it. Silver was discovered shortly downstream in 1886, prompting a short-lived silver rush but the ore was found to be low quality. Three years later Garretson became a railroad junction and most of Palisades relocated to the north. A steel truss bridge built over Split Rock Creek in 1908 is on the National Register of Historic Places.

== Recreation ==
The park's recreational features include campground, camper cabins, group tenting area, and lodge in addition to hiking trails, fishing, canoeing and rock climbing. The quartzite formations make the park popular with rock climbers and Split Rock Creek is mainly used for fishing, swimming, and kayaking. the park itself has hiking trails and is a common places for wedding's, family reunions, and photography.
