= Lake Yankton =

Lake in the state of Minnesota, United States

- Location within Minnesota
- Location: Lyon County, Minnesota
- Coordinates: 44°14′47″N 95°51′51″W
- Type: lake

Lake Yankton is a lake in Lyon County, in the U.S. state of Minnesota.

Lake Yankton was named for the Yankton Dakota.
