= South Dakota Department of Game, Fish, and Parks =

- Official Logo of the South Dakota GFP

Agency overview
- Formed: 1918
- Type: Fish and Wildlife Management, Parks and Recreation, Law Enforcement Agency
- Jurisdiction: State of South Dakota, U.S.
- Headquarters: 523 E. Capitol Ave, Pierre, South Dakota 57501; 44.365453°N 100.345622°W
- Employees: 486 permanent, 513 seasonal, 174 interns (as of 2018)
- Annual budget: $56,246,035 (FY 2018)
- Agency executives: Kelly Hepler, Secretary of Game, Fish, and Parks; Tony Leif, Director of Wildlife; Katie Ceroll, Director of Parks and Recreation; Chris Petersen, Director of Administration
- Child agencies: Wildlife Division; Parks and Recreation Division
- Website: gfp.sd.gov

Map
- Jurisdiction of South Dakota GFP

The South Dakota Department of Game, Fish, and Parks (GFP) is the U.S. State of South Dakota's state agency charged with the management of the state's public recreational and outdoor resources. The GFP manages the 13 state parks and 43 state recreation areas within the state parks system, totaling over 96,000 acres of public lands. The agency manages the hunting of game and the state's fisheries, manages several wildlife management areas and game production areas to restore or establish habitat for a variety of species. The agency conducts public outdoor education programs, typically focusing on hunting and boating safety. The department issues hunting and fishing licenses along with issuance of boat registrations. The agency is also charged with enforcement of fish and game laws, including invasive species regulations. The agency is headquartered in Pierre, South Dakota.

== Game, Fish, and Parks Commission ==
The South Dakota Department of Game, Fish and Parks (GFP) manages the outdoor resources and associated recreational activities of the state under the authority granted by the South Dakota Constitution through South Dakota Codified Laws, Administrative Rules of South Dakota and policies of the Department. The GFP Commission serves as the advocate and liaison between the South Dakota Game, Fish and Parks and its customers and partners. The Commission consists of eight members, appointed by the Governor of South Dakota for four year terms. The commission sets rules, regulation, and policy for agency direction.

== GFP organization and divisions ==
Game, Fish & Parks is headquartered in Pierre, the state capitol. Regional offices are located in Aberdeen, Chamberlain, Ft. Pierre, Huron, Mobridge, Rapid City, Sioux Falls, Watertown, and Webster.

=== Wildlife division ===
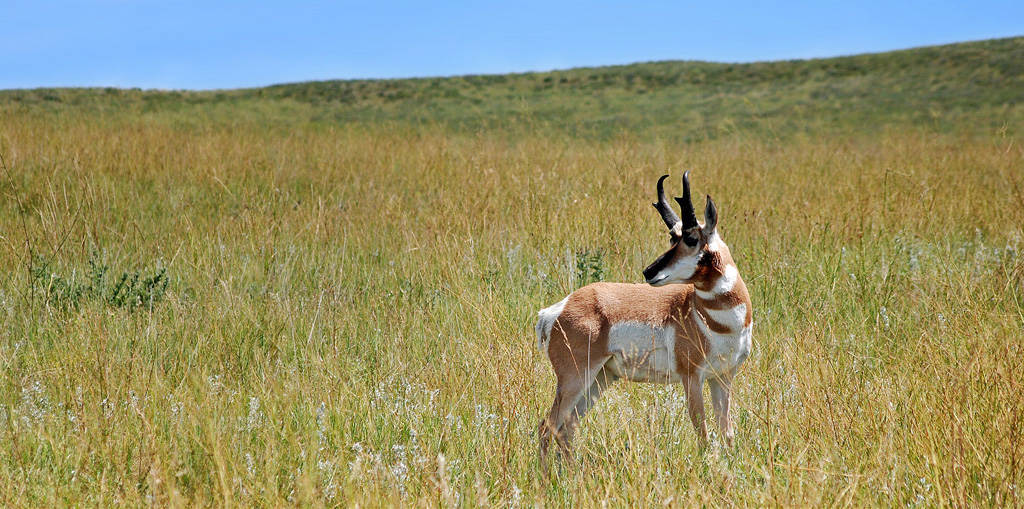
Pronghorn, a common species in western South Dakota.

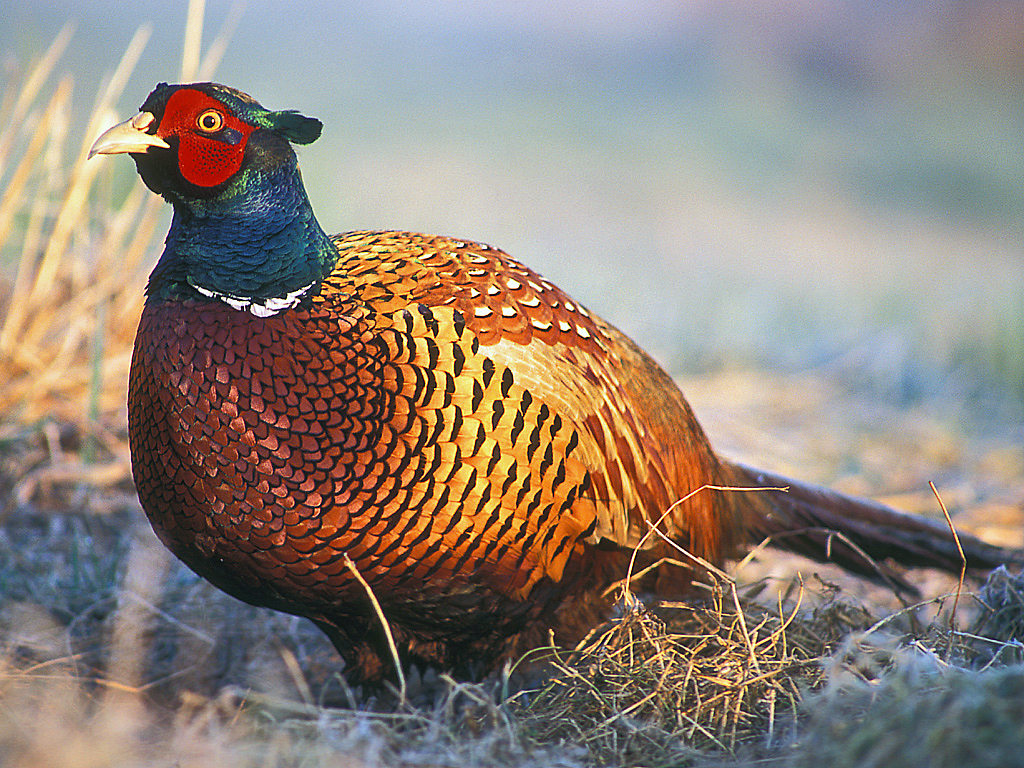
Common pheasant, the South Dakota State Bird, and a popular game species.

The wildlife division manages state wildlife areas, game production areas, and helps manage the various animal, fish, and plant species of South Dakota. The wildlife division helps monitor wildlife populations, establish hunting seasons, and manages state-owned lands for habitat for these species.

Game species managed by the GFP in South Dakota include: pronghorn, bighorn sheep, white-tailed deer, mule deer, elk, mountain goat, Mountain lion, bison, turkey, common pheasant, prairie grouse, sage grouse, ruffed grouse, partridge, mourning dove, cottontail rabbit, common snipe, American crow, quail, tree squirrel, and various waterfowl including duck, Canada goose, and snow goose. The taking or hunting of these species requires a state-issued hunting license and may only be hunted during designated hunting seasons. The GFP also regulates the Trapping of furbearing animals such as coyote, raccoon, beaver, muskrat, bobcats, mink and red fox within the state.

=== Law enforcement division ===
The law enforcement division consists of state conservation officers who are commissioned law enforcement officers. They enforce laws and conduct investigations related to hunting, fishing, boating, and other outdoor recreation activities. Officers are trained as first responders and respond to such incidents such as boating, snowmobile, and ATV accidents. They often are called to assist with search, rescue, and recovery efforts. As of 2018 there were 60 Conservation Officers stationed throughout the state.

=== Parks and recreation ===
GFP operates 13 state parks, 43 recreation areas, four nature areas, two historic sites and one trail, totaling approximately 96,000 acres. These areas preserve natural geologic features, historic and sacred Plains Indian sites, and historic pioneer settlements and forts. They also provide recreational facilities and access to waterbodies, including the Missouri River, on which there are 25 recreation areas. South Dakota State Parks and recreation areas range in size from the 19-acre Sandy Shore Recreation Area to the 71,000-acre Custer State Park. It was the first park established in the system, in 1919. Good Earth State Park at Blood Run is the most recent park, added in 2013. System-wide visitation in 2016 was 7,500,000.

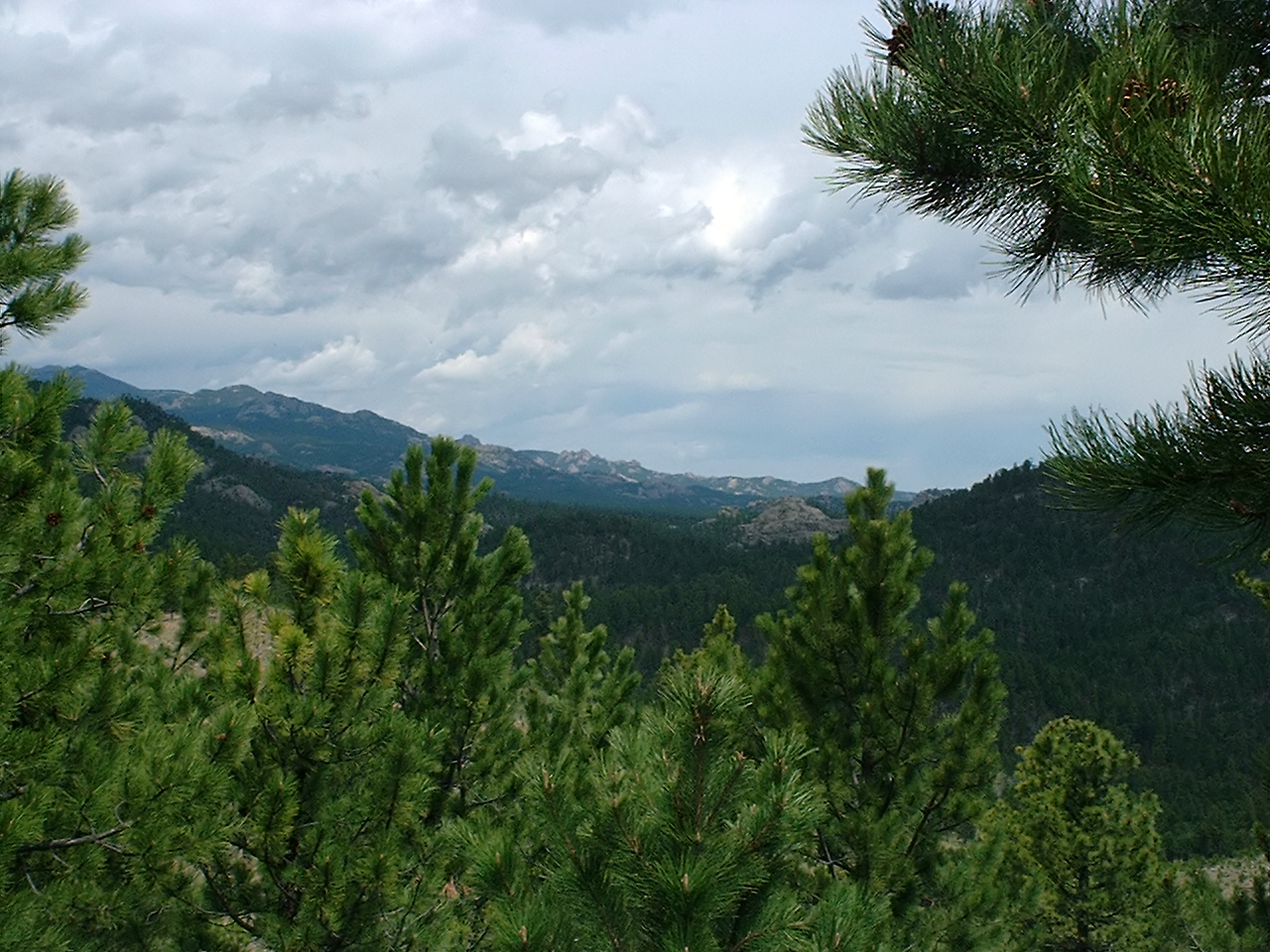
View of the Black Hills within Custer State Park

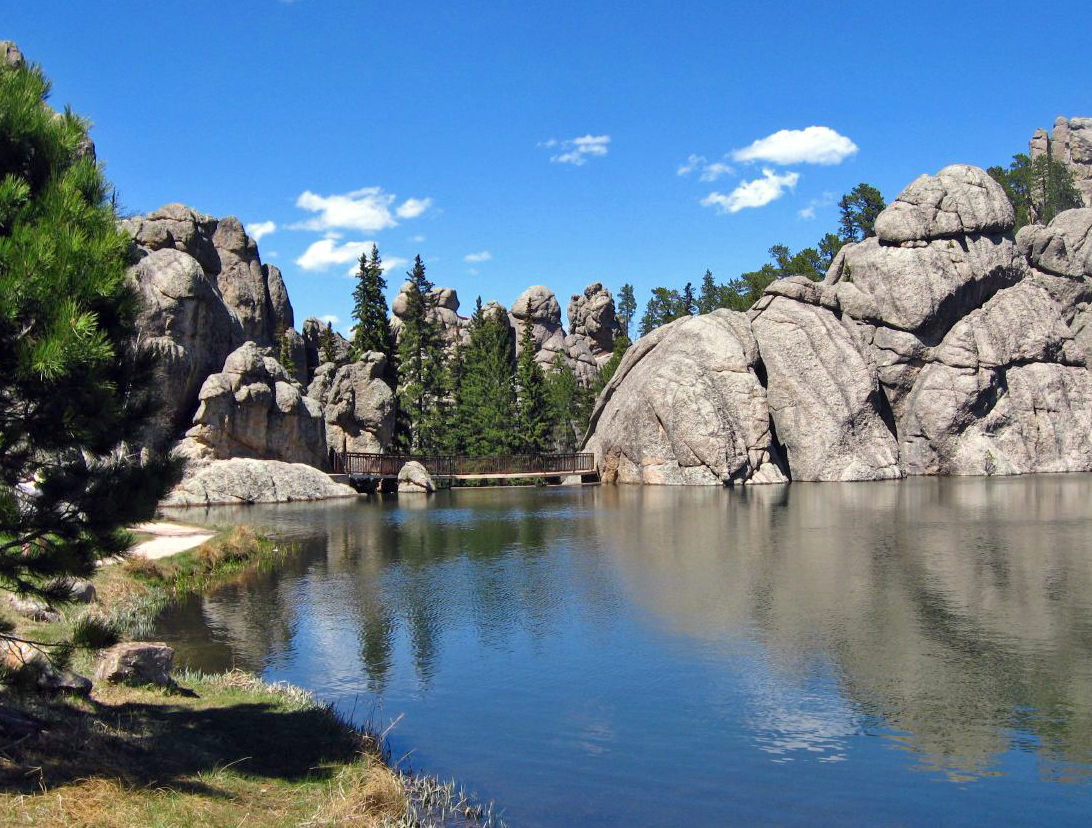
Sylvan Lake in Custer State Park

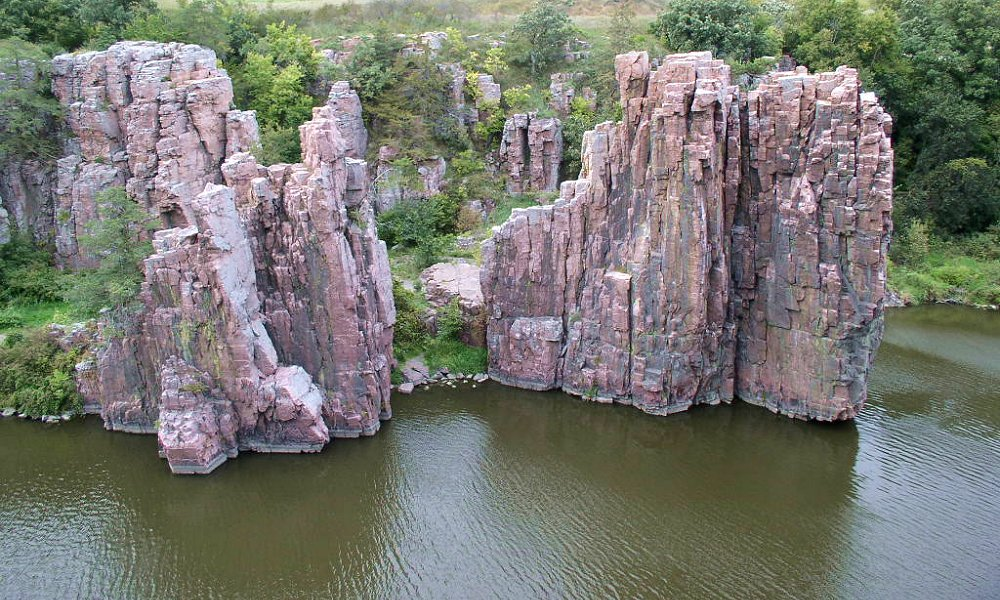
King and Queen Rock in Palisades State Park

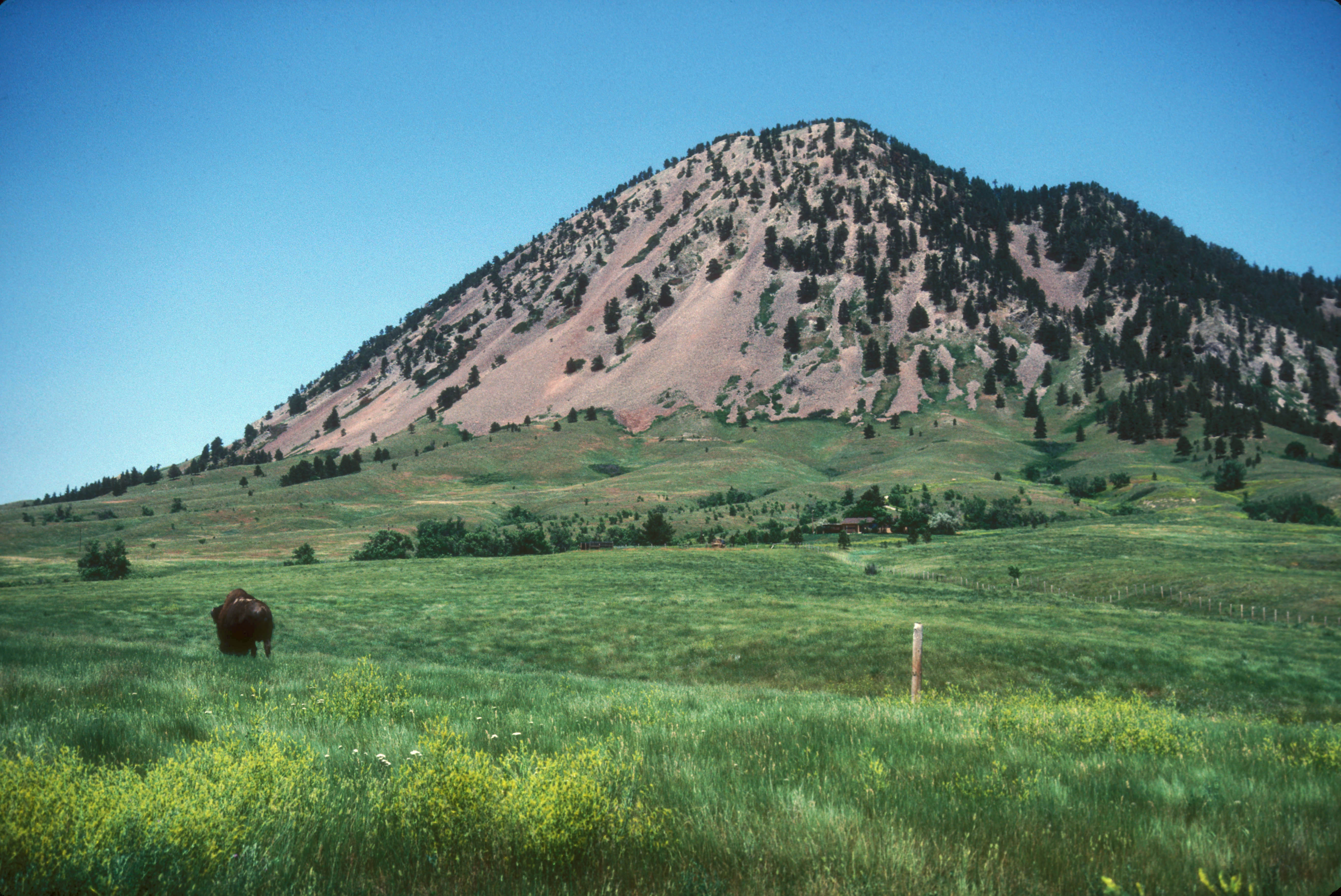
Bear Butte State Park, near Sturgis

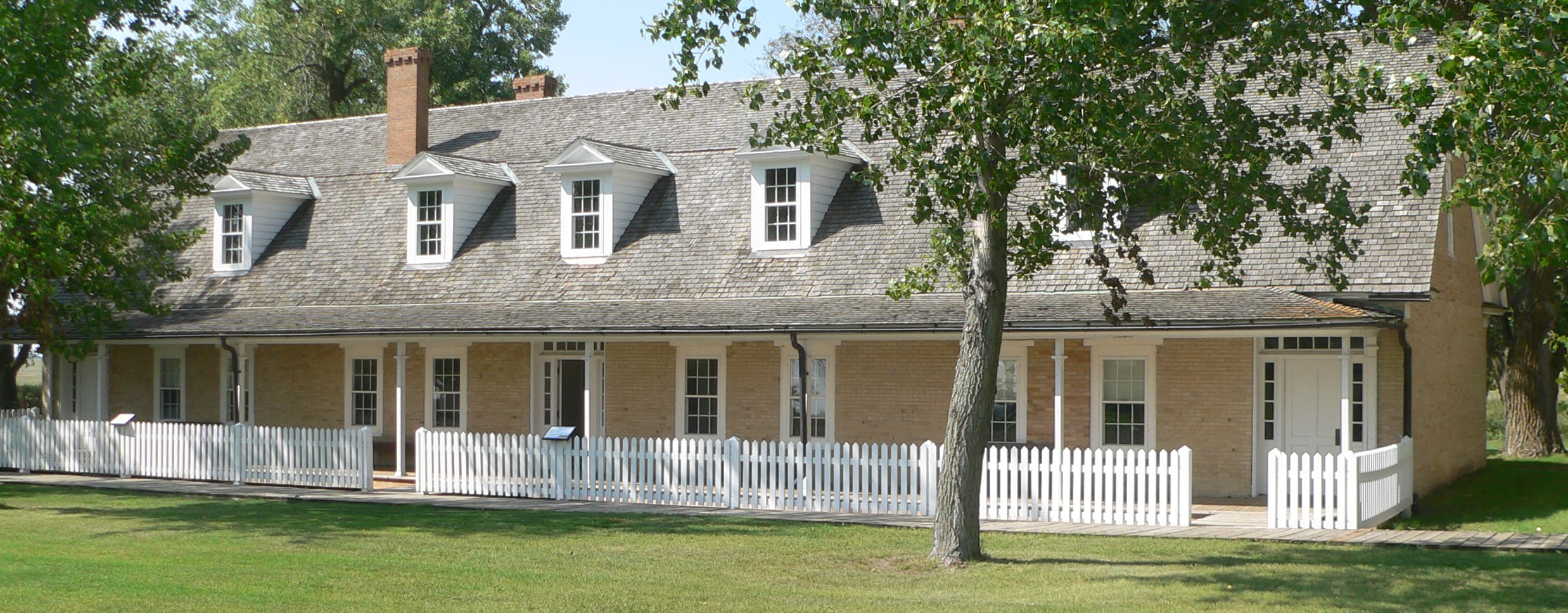
Officers' Quarters at Fort Sisseton State Historical Park.

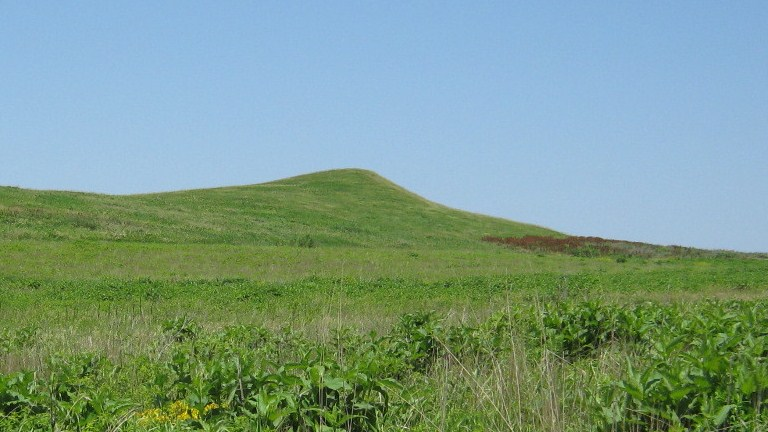
Spirit Mound Historic Prairie

=== Education and outreach ===
The GFP offers a variety of educational resources including curriculum supplements, outdoor skills and safety training, education materials (field guides, learning kits), and a variety of other resources (DNR for kids, grants). GFP operates two outdoor campus facilities, located in Sioux Falls and Rapid City for public outreach and outdoor education for the state's two largest cities.

=== Fisheries ===
The fisheries division operates state fish hatcheries, conducts fish health, population and other studies, and stocks rivers, lakes and streams. The GFP currently owns and manages four state fish hatchery facilities:

- Blue Dog State Fish Hatchery in Waubay
- Cleghorn Springs State Fish Hatchery in Rapid City
- McNenny State Fish Hatchery in Spearfish
- Whitlock Bay Salmon Spawning Station in Gettysburg

== Line of duty deaths ==
According to ODMP, 2 officers of the South Dakota GFP have been killed in the line of duty.

== See also ==
- List of law enforcement agencies in South Dakota
- List of state and territorial fish and wildlife management agencies in the United States
