= List of dams and reservoirs in Nebraska =

Following is a list of dams and reservoirs in Nebraska.

All major dams are linked below. The National Inventory of Dams defines any "major dam" as being 50 feet (15 m) tall with a storage capacity of at least 5,000 acre-feet (6,200,000 m^{3}), or of any height with a storage capacity of 25,000 acre-feet (31,000,000 m^{3}).

== Dams and reservoirs in Nebraska ==
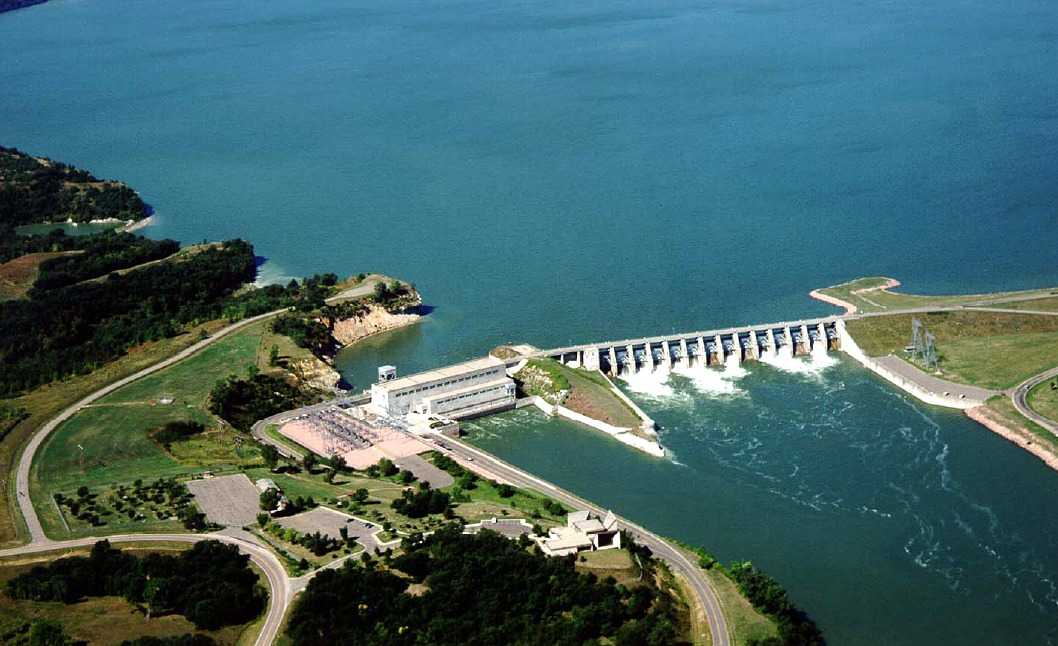
Gavins Point Dam

This list is incomplete. You can help Wikipedia by expanding it.

- Bartley Diversion Dam, Republican River, United States Bureau of Reclamation
- Box Butte Dam, Niobrara River, USBR
- Cambridge Diversion Dam, Republican River, USBR
- Culbertson Diversion Dam, Frenchman Creek, USBR
- Davis Creek Dam, Davis Creek, USBR
- Dry Spotted Tail Diversion Dam, Dry Spotted Tail Creek, USBR
- Dunlap Diversion Dam, Niobrara River, USBR
- Enders Dam, Frenchman Creek, USBR
- Gavins Point Dam (in Nebraska and South Dakota), Lewis and Clark Lake, Missouri River, United States Army Corps of Engineers
- Kent Diversion Dam, North Loup, USBR
- Harlan County Reservoir, Republican River, United States Army Corps of Engineers
- Kingsley Dam, Lake McConaughy, Central Nebraska Public Power and Irrigation District
- Lake Alice No 1 Dam, offstream equalizing reservoir, USBR
- Lake Alice No 1 and 1 Half, offstream equalizing reservoir, USBR
- Lake Alice No 2 Dam, offstream equalizing reservoir, USBR
- Medicine Creek Dam, Medicine Creek, USBR
- Merritt Dam, Snake River, USBR
- Milburn Diversion Dam, Middle Loup, USBR
- Minatare Dam, offstream equalizing reservoir, USBR
- Papio Creek Dams, Glenn Cunningham Lake, USACE
- Red Willow Creek Diversion Dam, Red Willow Creek, USBR
- Red Willow Dam, Red Willow Creek, USBR
- Sherman Dam, Sherman Reservoir, Loup Basin Reclamation District
- Spencer Dam, Niobrara River, Nebraska Public Power District
- Superior Courtland Diversion Dam, Republican River, USBR
- Trenton Dam, Republican River, USBR
- Tub Springs Creek Diversion Dam, Tub Springs Creek, USBR
- Virginia Smith Dam, Calamus River, USBR
