= Hugh Butler =

Hugh Butler may refer to:

- Hugh Butler (footballer) (1875–1939), Scottish footballer
- Hugh A. Butler (1878–1954), Nebraska politician
- Hugh Ernest Butler (1916–1978), Welsh-born astronomer
- Hugh Butler (MP), British politician

== See also ==
- Hugh Butler Lake, the reservoir created by Red Willow Dam
