= List of dams in the Missouri River watershed =

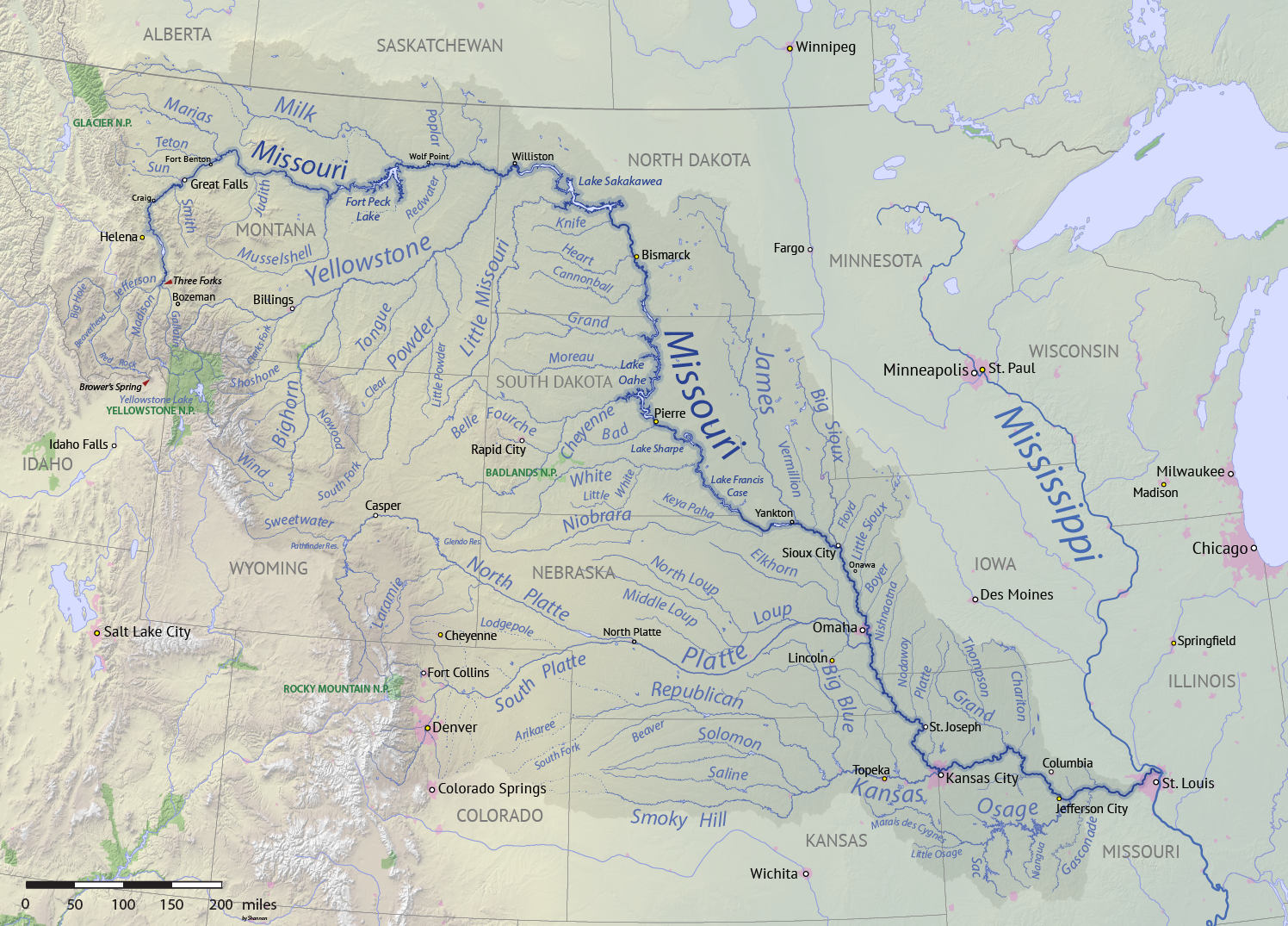
Map showing the Missouri River basin

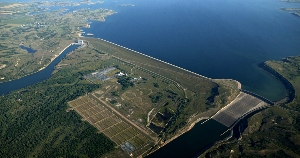
Garrison Dam, which forms Lake Sakakawea, the largest reservoir on the Missouri River

This is a list of dams in the watershed of the Missouri River, a tributary of the Mississippi River, in the United States. There are an estimated 17,200 dams and reservoirs in the basin, most of which are small, local irrigation structures. Reservoirs in the watershed total a capacity of approximately 141,000,000 acre-feet (174 km^{3}).

== Mainstem dams ==
Name	State	Reservoir	Height		Storage capacity		Capacity (MW)
			ft	m	acre.ft	km^{3}	
Toston Dam	MT		56	17	3,000	0.004	10
Canyon Ferry Dam	MT	Canyon Ferry Lake	225	69	1,973,000	2.434	50
Hauser Dam	MT	Hauser Lake	80	24	98,000	0.121	19
Holter Dam	MT	Holter Lake	124	38	243,000	0.300	48
Black Eagle Dam	MT	Long Pool	13	4	2,000	0.002	21
Rainbow Dam	MT		29	9	1,000	0.001	36
Cochrane Dam	MT		59	18	3,000	0.004	64
Ryan Dam	MT		61	19	5,000	0.006	60
Morony Dam	MT		59	18	3,000	0.004	48
Fort Peck Dam	MT	Fort Peck Lake	250	76	18,690,000	23.053	185
Garrison Dam	ND	Lake Sakakawea	210	64	23,800,000	29.356	515
Oahe Dam	SD	Lake Oahe	245	75	23,500,000	28.986	786
Big Bend Dam	SD	Lake Sharpe	95	29	1,910,000	2.356	493
Fort Randall Dam	SD	Lake Francis Case	165	50	5,700,000	7.031	320
Gavins Point Dam	NE; SD	Lewis and Clark Lake	74	23	492,000	0.607	132

== Tributary dams ==
All tributary dams with a storage capacity greater than 250,000 acre-feet (0.31 km^{3}) are listed in the table below.

Name	State	River	Reservoir	Height		Storage capacity		Capacity (MW)
				ft	m	acre.ft	km^{3}	
Bagnell Dam	MO	Osage	Lake of the Ozarks	148	45	1,927,000	2.377	215
Boysen Dam	WY	Wind	Boysen Reservoir	220	67	952,400	1.175	15
Buffalo Bill Dam	WY	Shoshone	Buffalo Bill Reservoir	350	110	623,557	0.769	30.5
Chatfield Dam	CO	South Platte	Chatfield Reservoir	147	45	350,000	0.432	0
Clark Canyon Dam	MT	Jefferson	Clark Canyon Reservoir	148	45	325,324	0.401	0
Glendo Dam	WY	North Platte	Glendo Reservoir	190	58	1,170,505	1.444	38
Harry S. Truman Dam	MO	Osage	Truman Reservoir	126	38	5,408,600	6.671	160
Hebgen Dam	MT	Madison	Hebgen Lake	85	26	325,000	0.401	0
Keyhole Dam	WY	Belle Fourche	Keyhole Reservoir	168	51	334,200	0.412	0
Kingsley Dam	NE	North Platte	Lake McConaughy	162	49	1,740,000	2.146	51.9
Melvern Dam	KS	Marais des Cygnes	Melvern Reservoir	125	38	355,300	0.438	0
Milford Dam	KS	Republican	Milford Lake	90	27	1,125,200	1.387	0
Pathfinder Dam	WY	North Platte	Pathfinder Reservoir	214	65	1,016,500	1.254	66.8
Perry Dam	KS	Delaware	Perry Lake	151	46	1,417,700	1.749	0
Pomme de Terre Dam	MO	Pomme de Terre	Pomme de Terre Lake	155	47	650,000	0.802	0
Seminoe Dam	WY	North Platte	Seminoe Reservoir	295	90	1,017,279	1.255	45
Stockton Dam	MO	Sac	Stockton Lake	131	40	1,674,000	2.065	52
Tiber Dam	MT	Marias	Lake Elwell	211	64	1,515,000	1.869	10
Tuttle Creek Dam	KS	Big Blue	Tuttle Creek Lake	137	42	3,185,700	3.929	0
Wilson Dam	KS	Saline	Wilson Lake	130	40	736,000	0.908	0
Yellowtail Dam	MT	Bighorn	Bighorn Lake	525	160	1,381,189	1.704	250

== See also ==
- List of tributaries of the Missouri River
- Pick–Sloan Missouri Basin Program
