= Lewis and Clark State Recreation Area (Nebraska) =

Recreation area in Nebraska, United States

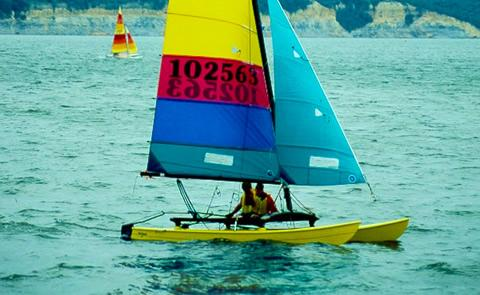
- Sailing on Lewis and Clark Lake

- Location within Nebraska Location within the United States
- Location: Knox, Nebraska, United States
- Coordinates: 42.836222°N 97.577608°W
- Area: 864 acres (350 ha)
- Elevation: 1,214 ft (370 m)
- Governing body: Nebraska Game and Parks Commission

Lewis and Clark State Recreation Area (SRA) is an 864-acre (350 ha) State Recreation Area located on the southern shore of Lewis and Clark Lake, in northeastern Nebraska. The recreation area is located in Knox County, approximately 12 miles (19 km) northwest of Crofton. The recreation area is managed by the Nebraska Game and Parks Commission.

== Background ==
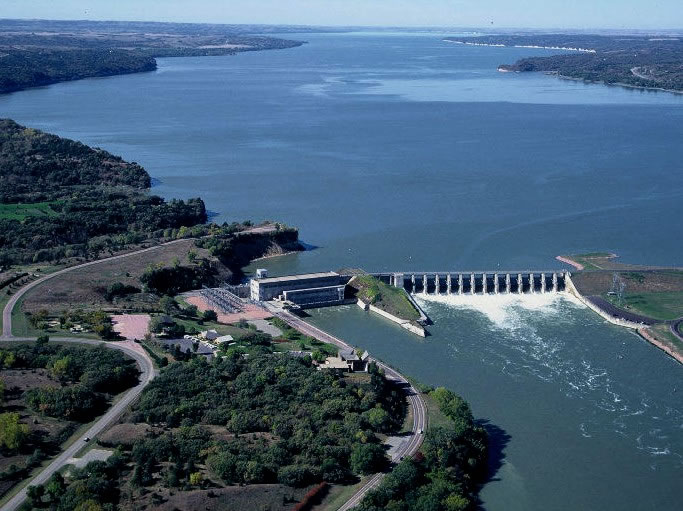
Lewis and Clark Lake and Gavins Point Dam.

Lewis and Clark Lake was created as a result of the construction of Gavins Point Dam on the Missouri River, completed in 1957. The lake is approximately 25 miles (40 km) long, with a surface area of 31,400 acres (127 km^{2}), and over 90 miles (140 km) of shoreline; it has a maximum depth of 45 feet (14 m). Following the creation of the reservoir several public recreation areas were established to allow for the access to the land and water resources of the area. The public lands that make up Lewis and Clark SRA are managed under a lease agreement from the U.S. Army Corps of Engineers to the Nebraska Game and Parks Commission.

There are several areas located within Lewis and Clark SRA including the main Weigand-Burbach Area (location of the Park Headquarters, Marina, and main campground and cabins), South Shore Recreation Area (lake access, boat ramp, multi-purpose trail, and equestrian campground) near Gavins Point Dam, Bloomfield Recreation Area (campground and boat ramp), and Miller Creek Recreation Area (campground, boat ramp, and hiking trail).

== Recreational opportunities ==
The recreation area maintains over 150 campsites with 30- and 50-amp electrical hook-ups and more than 100 primitive campsites, all located along or within walking distance of Lewis and Clark Lake. Campgrounds include showers, picnic tables, fire pits, nearby water spigots, dump stations and playground. Camping is available year-round; however modern facilities operate from April–October, weather permitting. An equestrian camping area with corrals is also located in the south shore area. Lewis and Clark offers 10 modern two-bedroom cabins on the shoreline of Lewis and Clark Lake. Cabins have two queen beds and three single beds with a maximum occupancy of eight. Cabins are equipped with linens, towels, stove, refrigerator, coffee pot, toaster, microwave and kitchen service for eight. All cabins also have a covered patio, picnic table, outdoor grill and campfire ring.

The Weigand Marina is open Memorial Day weekend through Labor Day and offers a variety of groceries, candy, snacks, soft serve ice cream, bait, tackle, firewood, fuel and other sundries. The area offers 116 leased seasonal docks and six daily rental docks that may be reserved in advance. A public boat ramp is available at the marina for boater access to Lewis and Clark Lake.

Anglers at Lewis and Clark will find a variety of species, including walleye, sauger, largemouth bass, smallmouth bass, bluegill, crappie and catfish. Boating is very popular at Lewis and Clark Lake. Sailboats, pleasure boats, and personal watercraft are all permitted on the lake. There is a playground, horseshoe pits and a sand volleyball court. There are 4.5 miles of hiking, biking, cross country skiing, snowmobiling and horseback trails in the South Shore Area. During the winter months when the ice is sufficient, the lake is open to ice fishing, ice skating and snowmobiling.

Hunting is allowed beginning the Tuesday after Labor Day. Substantial hunting opportunities are available at Lewis and Clark SRA, which include upland game, big game and waterfowl. Lewis and Clark's upland game habitat offers hunting opportunities for pheasant, quail and dove. In addition there are typically good numbers of white-tail deer and wild turkey. Hunters should contact the park office for specific regulations.

== Zebra Mussels ==
Zebra mussels, an aquatic invasive species, were found in Lewis and Clark Lake in 2014. Zebra mussels can clog water intakes, and can damage boat motors over time, along with other negative effects. Additional rules and regulations apply for boaters to help stop the spread of these invasive species and help protect the water resources of Nebraska.

== See also ==
- List of Nebraska state parks
- Lewis and Clark Lake
- Gavins Point Dam
