= Lewis & Clark Recreation Area =

State recreation area in Yankton County, South Dakota, United States

Lewis and Clark Recreation Area
- View of Lewis and Clark Lake from along a trail on the South Dakota shore.

- Location within South Dakota
- Location: Yankton County, South Dakota, United States
- Coordinates: 42°52′04″N 97°31′17″W
- Elevation: 1,214 ft (370 m)
- Established: 1966
- Administrator: South Dakota Department of Game, Fish and Parks
- Website: Official website

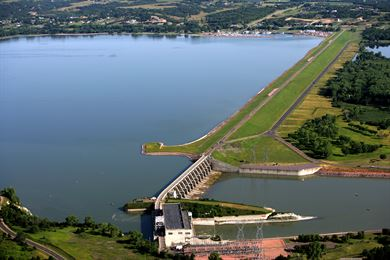
Aerial photo of Gavins Point Dam and Lewis and Clark Lake, looking north.

Lewis and Clark Recreation Area is a public recreation area near Yankton in southeastern South Dakota, located on the northern shore of Lewis and Clark Lake, a 31,400-acre (12,700 ha) Missouri River reservoir impounded by Gavins Point Dam.

== Features ==
The park features three campgrounds with a total of 418 campsites, 20 camper cabins, biking, hiking, equestrian, and nature trails, multiple beaches, boat launching facilities, disc golf course and archery range.

The Lewis and Clark Resort and Marina, located within the recreation area, is privately operated under an agreement with Division of Parks and Recreation. Amenities include a motel, cabins, swimming pool, floating fuel dock, slip and boat rentals, and a full-service restaurant.

== Environmental concerns ==
In 2014, zebra mussels, an aquatic invasive mussel, were discovered in the lake and have infested the reservoir and the Missouri River downstream of Gavins Point Dam.

== See also ==
- Chief White Crane Recreation Area
- Pierson Ranch Recreation Area
- Gavins Point National Fish Hatchery
- List of South Dakota state parks
