= South Yankton, Nebraska =

Populated place in Nebraska, U.S.

Coordinates: 42°50′58″N 97°23′54″W

South Yankton is a populated place in Cedar County, Nebraska, United States, located just south of Yankton, South Dakota, on U.S. Route 81. Gavins Point Dam is located four miles west of South Yankton on Nebraska Highway 121.
