= Nebraska Tailwaters Recreation Area =

Public recreation area

- Location within Nebraska Location within the United States
- Location: Cedar County, Nebraska, U.S.
- Nearest city: Crofton, Nebraska
- Coordinates: 42.849387°N 97.472063°W
- Governing body: U.S. Army Corps of Engineers
- Website: U.S. Army Corps of Engineers - Gavins Point Project

Nebraska Tailwaters Recreation Area is a public recreation area located on the southern bank of the Missouri River, immediately downstream of Gavins Point Dam in Cedar County, Nebraska. The area offers 42 campsites (31 RV campsites and 11 tent-only campsites), boat launch facilities, fishing pier, and shore access to the Missouri River. The recreation area is owned and managed by the U.S. Army Corps of Engineers and is open year-round, with the campground open from May–October each year. The recreation area is accessible via NE-121.
