= Lewis and Clark Lake =

Lake in Nebraska and South Dakota, U.S.

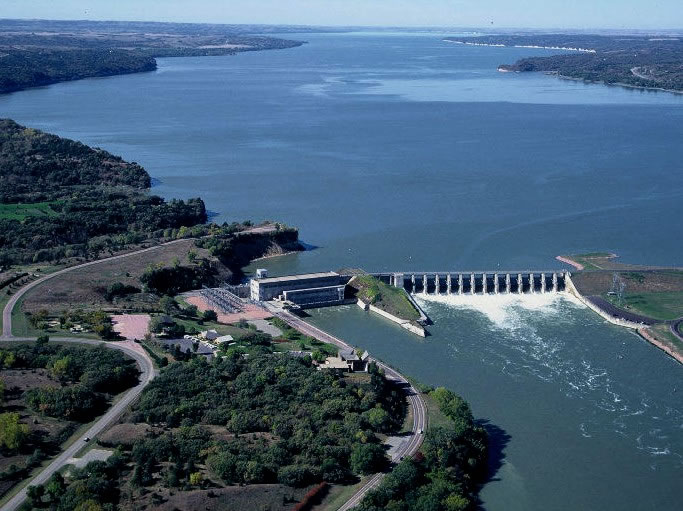
- Lewis and Clark Lake behind Gavins Point Dam, near Yankton, South Dakota, on the Missouri River

- Location within Nebraska Location within South Dakota Location within the United States
- Location: Nebraska and South Dakota, United States
- Coordinates: 42°51′45″N 97°29′30″W
- Type: reservoir (artificial lake; man-made lake)
- Primary inflows: Missouri River, Niobrara River
- Primary outflows: Missouri River
- Catchment area: 16,000 sq mi (41,000 km^{2})
- Basin countries: United States
- Max. length: 25 miles (40 km)
- Max. width: 1.8 miles (2.9 km) at dam
- Surface area: 31,400 acres (12,700 ha)
- Average depth: 15–30 ft (4.6–9.1 m)
- Max. depth: 45 ft (14 m)
- Water volume: 492,000 acre⋅ft (0.607 km^{3})
- Shore length^{1}: 90 mi (140 km)
- Surface elevation: 1,206–1,210 ft (368–369 m) msl
- Settlements: Yankton, South Dakota; Springfield, South Dakota; Running Water, South Dakota; Santee, Nebraska; Niobrara, Nebraska
- ^{1} Shore length is not a well-defined measure.

Lewis and Clark Lake is a 31,400 acre (130 km^{2}) reservoir located on the border of the U.S. states of Nebraska and South Dakota on the Missouri River. The lake is approximately 25 miles (40 km) in length with over 90 miles (140 km) of shoreline and a maximum water depth of 45 feet (14 m). The lake is impounded by Gavins Point Dam and is managed by the U.S. Army Corps of Engineers, Omaha District.

== History ==
The Missouri River Valley Area abounds with history involving several early Native American Tribes, Pioneers, and other settlers to the area due to ease of river transportation and abundant resources. Lewis and Clark Lake is named after explorers Meriwether Lewis and William Clark of the Lewis and Clark Expedition. The lake is located along the Lewis and Clark National Historic Trail.

The archaeological record in the area dates back to the Archaic Period, sometime around 3,000 to 5,000 BC. The Archaic Period people lived along small tributary streams that flow into the Missouri Valley. Later, Woodland Period people (500 BC – 1,000 AD) lived in the area. More recent inhabitants include the Ponca, Yankton Sioux and Omaha tribes in the late 18th and 19th centuries. The Minnesota Santee Sioux arrived on the river shore in the mid-1800s and remain in the area. In 1804, while traveling up the Missouri River on their epic journey to the Pacific Ocean, Lewis and Clark participated in a Grand council with the Yankton Sioux at a site below Calumet Bluff. This significant meeting was the first meeting with a Sioux tribe on their journey upstream.

In 1874, the Bon Homme Colony of Hutterites, a branch of the Mennonite movement exiled from Austria, settled on what is now the north shore of Lewis and Clark Lake. They are the first Hutterite Colony in South Dakota and the United States. The colony maintains a traditional communal way of life. The lake was filled following the completion of construction of Gavins Point Dam across the river valley in 1957.

== Location ==
The lake is an impoundment of the Missouri River, located approximately 811.1 miles (1,305.3 km) upstream of St. Louis, Missouri, where the Missouri River joins the Mississippi River. The lake is located within Cedar and Knox Counties in Nebraska and Bon Homme and Yankton Counties in South Dakota. Lake Yankton is located immediately downstream of Gavins Point Dam. The Santee Sioux Reservation is located along the southwestern shore in Knox County. The lake is located approximately 4 miles (6.4 km) west or upstream of Yankton, South Dakota.

== Lewis and Clark Visitor Center ==
The Lewis and Clark Visitor Center is located just south of Gavins Point Dam atop Calumet Bluff with views of Lewis and Clark Lake, Lake Yankton, and the Missouri River below the dam. The visitor center is open daily from Memorial Day weekend through Labor Day weekend and open weekdays during other times of the year. The visitor center interprets the history of the Missouri River Basin, including Native Americans, pioneers, the Lewis and Clark Expedition (which traveled through the area); along with local wildlife and the history of the Corps of Engineers in the area. A theater shows educational videos on the Lewis and Clark Expedition, construction of Gavins Point Dam, and the natural history of the Missouri River Region. A bookstore offers educational books, videos, and other merchandise for sale. The visitor center is known as a viewing point for the American Bald Eagle, which frequents the Missouri River below the dam, especially in winter months. The visitors center is operated and staffed by U.S. Army Corps of Engineers Park Rangers.

== Parks and recreation ==
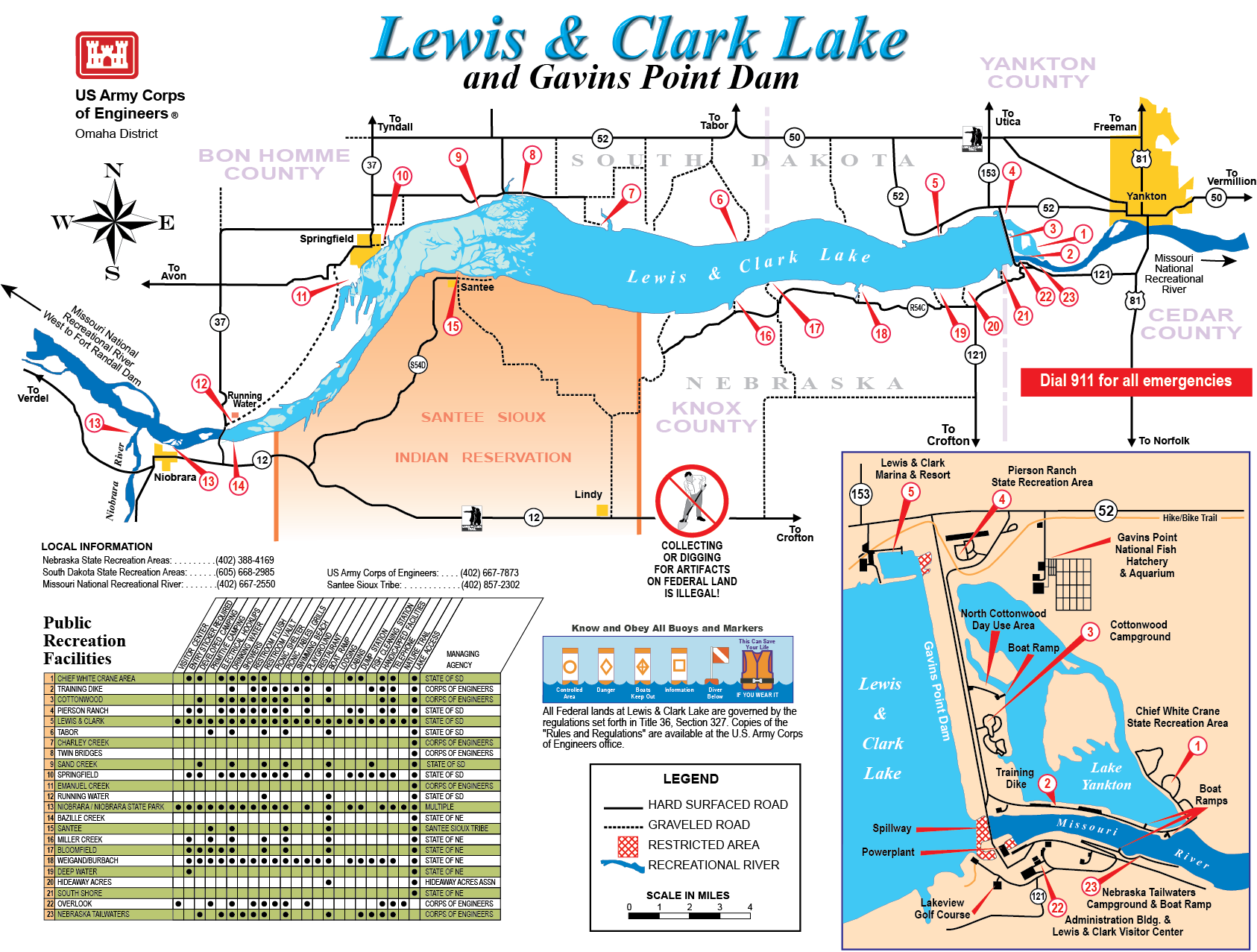
Lake Map identifying Points of Interest and Recreational Areas

View of Lewis and Clark Lake from Calumet Bluff overlook and hiking trail in Cedar County, Nebraska

View of Lewis and Clark Lake from Lewis & Clark Recreation Area along the South Dakota shore

Lewis and Clark Lake is a very popular regional tourist destination in the upper Midwest for camping, water sports, hiking, bird watching, hunting, fishing, swimming, and biking. Average annual public visitation exceeds one-million visitors per year to the lake area. Many of these recreation areas around the lake offer boat ramps, marinas, campgrounds, and day-use areas. The upper stretches of the lake are renowned for their superior waterfowl viewing and hunting opportunities along the Missouri River flyway.

Located downstream of the lake is the 59-mile reach of the Missouri National Recreational River (MNRR) which stretches eastward from the dam to Ponca State Park, upstream of the lake is the 39-mile reach of the MNRR which stretches westward to Fort Randall Dam.

=== List of recreation and public use areas ===
The following are public parks and lake access areas on Lewis and Clark Lake:

- Nebraska:
  - Lewis and Clark State Recreation Area (NE GPC)
    - Weigand-Burbach Area & Marina
    - South Shore Recreation Area
    - Bloomfield Recreation Area
    - Miller Creek Recreation Area
  - Niobrara State Park (NE GPC)
  - Niobrara Recreation Area (Village of Niobrara)
  - Calumet Bluff Trail & Overlook (USACE)
  - Hideaway Acres (Hideaway Acres Assn.)
  - Santee Recreation Area (USACE & Santee Sioux Nation)
  - Cottonwood Recreation Area (USACE)
  - Nebraska Tailwaters Recreation Area (USACE)
  - Training Dike Recreation Area (USACE)
  - Deep Water Area (USACE)
  - Devil's Nest (USACE)
  - Bazile Creek Wildlife Management Area (NE GPC)
- South Dakota:
  - Lewis & Clark Recreation Area (SD GFP)
    - Lewis & Clark Marina and Resort
    - Pierson Ranch Recreation Area
    - Chief White Crane Recreation Area
  - Gavins Point National Fish Hatchery and Aquarium (U.S. Fish & Wildlife Service)
  - Tabor Lakeside Use Area (SD GFP)
  - Charley Creek Lakeside Use Area (SD GFP)
  - Twin Bridges Lakeside Use Area (SD GFP)
  - Sand Creek Lakeside Use Area (SD GFP)
  - Springfield Recreation Area (SD GFP)
  - Springfield Bottoms Game Production Area (SD GFP)
  - Running Water Lakeside Use Area (SD GFP)
- Key:
  - NE GPC = Nebraska Game and Parks Commission
  - USACE = U.S. Army Corps of Engineers
  - SD GFP = South Dakota Department of Game, Fish and Parks

== Fish, wildlife and natural resources ==
The natural resources and public lands on and around the lake are cooperatively managed by the U.S. Army Corps of Engineers, Nebraska Game and Parks Commission, and the South Dakota Department of Game, Fish, and Parks. Common game species around the lake include White-tailed deer, Wild Turkey, many species of waterfowl, Pheasant, Cottontail rabbit, Mourning Dove, and squirrel. The American Bald Eagle is commonly seen around the dam and lake area, especially in the winter months. Each January the Lewis and Clark Visitor Center hosts "Bald Eagle Days" a live-bird program that is popular with visitors.

Species of fish present include walleye, northern pike, sauger, sunfish, yellow perch, common carp, black bullhead, channel catfish, and smallmouth bass. Fishing below Gavins Point Dam is very popular, especially for the annual paddlefish snagging season in October and bowfishing in June. The "Fishing Wall" immediately below the dam's spillway is popular for fishing year-round as the dam keeps the river free of ice in the winter months.

The U.S. Army Corps of Engineers and the U.S. Fish and Wildlife Service monitor and manage threatened and endangered species on the lake and river. Species of concern include the Pallid sturgeon, least tern, and piping plover. A branch of the Corps known as the Missouri River Recovery Program monitors these species and helps to restore native habitat that was lost as a result of dam construction and channelization of the Missouri River. The Gavins Point National Fish Hatchery is located just downstream of the lake.

=== Current lake issues ===
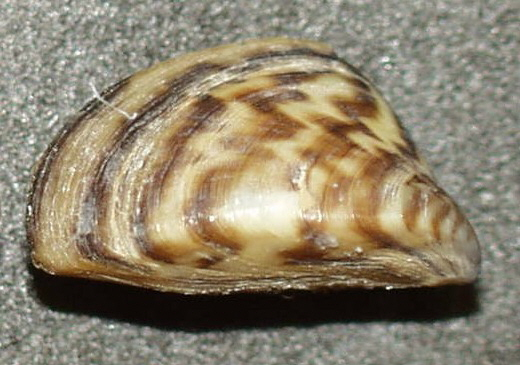
Close-up of a typical shell of a zebra mussel, an unwanted aquatic invasive species that was discovered in the lake in 2014

There are several issues impacting recreation, wildlife, and other issues. In 2014 zebra mussels, an aquatic invasive mussel were discovered in the lake and have infested the reservoir and the Missouri River downstream of Gavins Point Dam.

Lewis and Clark Lake is significantly impacted by sedimentation and siltation issues, diminishing the overall water surface area, water storage capacity, and recreational opportunities. Sediment carried by the Missouri River and Niobrara River is slowed and trapped within the reservoir due to the dam impounding and thus slowing the natural river flow. Studies show approximately 5.1 million tons of sediment are deposited in the lake each year, which contributes to the lake's increasing size of delta area on the western portions of the lake. Approximately 60% of the sediment comes from the Nebraska Sandhills via the Niobrara River. As of 2016, approximately 30% of the lake's overall surface area has diminished due to sedimentation deposits, and some figures project by 2045 approximately 50% of the lake will be diminished due to sedimentation deposits. Presently, there is no plan or solution to remove or slow the progression of the siltation within the lake.

== See also ==
- Gavins Point Dam
- Lake Yankton
- Missouri National Recreational River
- Santee Sioux Reservation
- List of dams and reservoirs in South Dakota
- List of dams and reservoirs in Nebraska
- List of dams and reservoirs in United States
