= Cedar County, Nebraska =

County in Nebraska, United States

- County
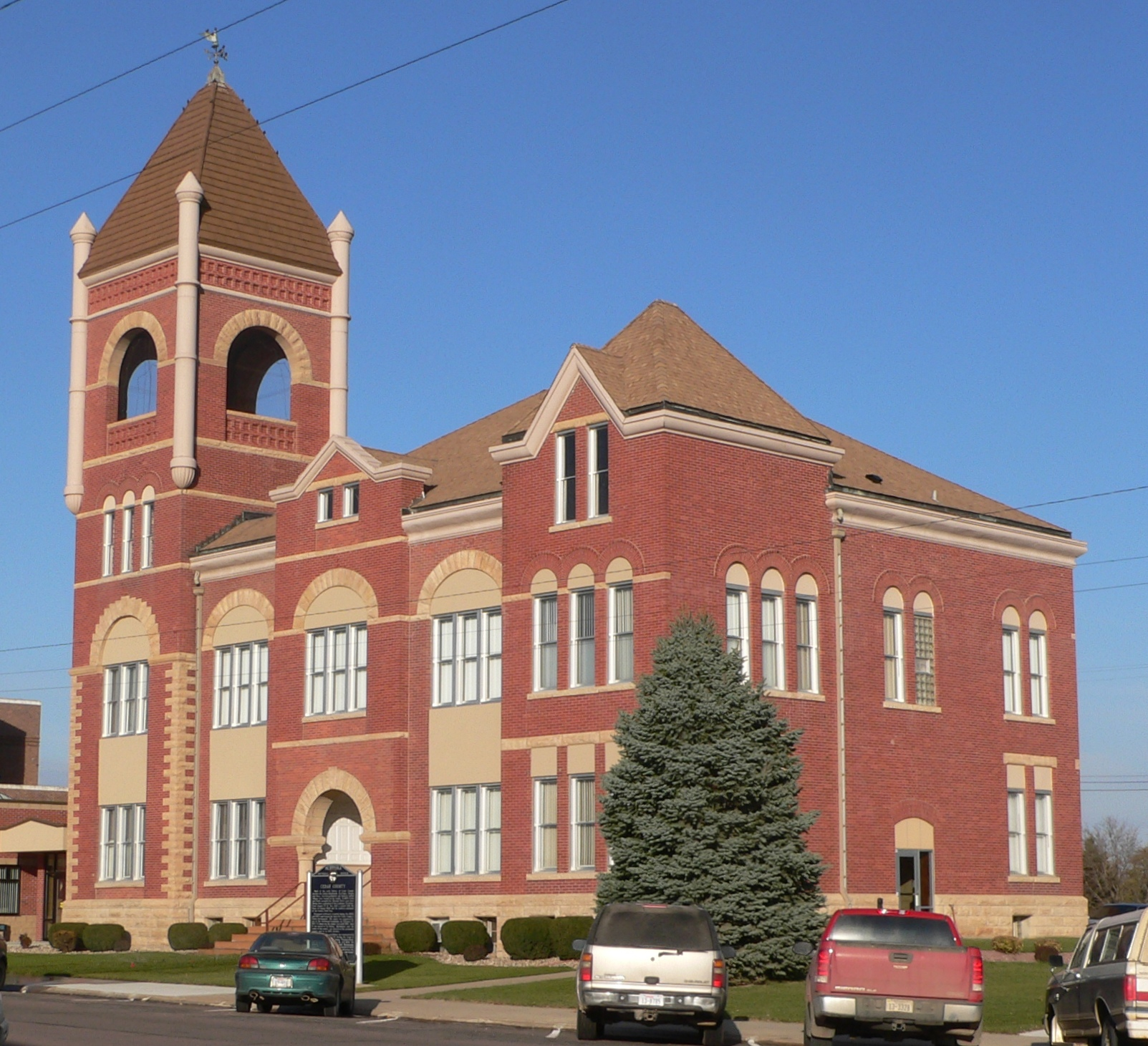
- Cedar County Courthouse in Hartington

- Location within the U.S. state of Nebraska
- Coordinates: 42°36′N 97°15′W
- Country: United States
- State: Nebraska
- Founded: 1857
- Seat: Hartington
- Largest city: Hartington

Area
  - Total: 746 sq mi (1,930 km^{2})
  - Land: 740 sq mi (1,900 km^{2})
  - Water: 5.5 sq mi (14 km^{2}) 0.7%

Population (2020)
  - Total: 8,380
  - Estimate (2025): 8,373 ▼
  - Density: 11/sq mi (4.4/km^{2})
- Time zone: UTC−6 (Central)
  - Summer (DST): UTC−5 (CDT)
- Congressional district: 3rd
- Website: cedarcountyne.gov

Cedar County is a county in the U.S. state of Nebraska. As of the 2020 United States census, the population was 8,380. The county seat is Hartington. The county was formed in 1857, and was named for the Cedar tree groves in the area. In the Nebraska license plate system, Cedar County is represented by the prefix 13 (it had the 13th-largest number of vehicles registered in the county when the license plate system was established in 1922).

== Geography ==
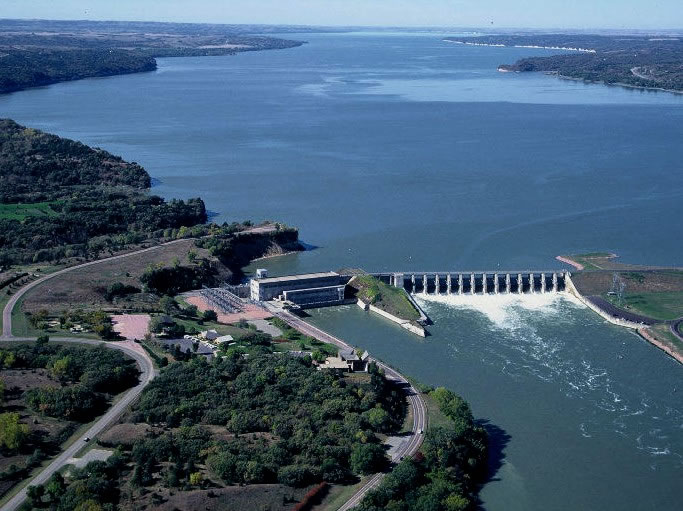
Gavins Point Dam, impounding Lewis and Clark Lake on the Missouri River in the northwestern part of Cedar County

Cedar County is on the northern edge of Nebraska. Its north boundary abuts the south boundary line of the state of South Dakota, across the Missouri River. According to the US Census Bureau, the county has an area of 746 square miles (1,930 km^{2}), of which 740 square miles (1,900 km^{2}) is land and 5.5 square miles (14 km^{2}) (0.7%) is water.

=== Major highways ===
- U.S. Highway 20
- U.S. Highway 81
- Nebraska Highway 12
- Nebraska Highway 15
- Nebraska Highway 57
- Nebraska Highway 59
- Nebraska Highway 84
- Nebraska Highway 121

=== Adjacent counties ===
- Clay County, South Dakota – northeast
- Dixon County – east
- Wayne County – southeast
- Pierce County – southwest
- Knox County – west
- Yankton County, South Dakota – northwest

=== Protected areas ===
- Audubon Bend Wildlife Area
- Calumet Bluff
- Chalkrock State Wildlife Management Area
- Cottonwood Recreation Area
- Missouri National Recreational River (part)
  - Bow Creek Recreation Area
  - Meridian Bridge
- Nebraska Tailwaters Recreation Area
- Tatanka State Wildlife Management Area (part)
- Training Dike Recreation Area
- Wiseman State Wildlife Management Area

=== Lakes ===
- Chalkrock Lake
- Lewis and Clark Lake (part)

== Demographics ==
Historical population
Census	Pop.	Note	%±
1860	246		—
1870	1,032		319.5%
1880	2,899		180.9%
1890	7,028		142.4%
1900	12,467		77.4%
1910	15,191		21.8%
1920	16,225		6.8%
1930	16,427		1.2%
1940	15,126		−7.9%
1950	13,843		−8.5%
1960	13,368		−3.4%
1970	12,192		−8.8%
1980	11,375		−6.7%
1990	10,131		−10.9%
2000	9,615		−5.1%
2010	8,852		−7.9%
2020	8,380		−5.3%
2025 (est.)	8,373	▼	−0.1%
US Decennial Census; 1790-1960 1900-1990; 1990-2000 2010 2020

=== 2020 census ===
As of the 2020 census, the county had a population of 8,380. The median age was 43.2 years. 25.2% of residents were under the age of 18 and 21.9% of residents were 65 years of age or older. For every 100 females there were 104.4 males, and for every 100 females age 18 and over there were 101.3 males age 18 and over.

The racial makeup of the county was 96.2% White, 0.3% Black or African American, 0.2% American Indian and Alaska Native, 0.1% Asian, 0.0% Native Hawaiian and Pacific Islander, 0.9% from some other race, and 2.2% from two or more races. Hispanic or Latino residents of any race comprised 2.2% of the population.

0.0% of residents lived in urban areas, while 100.0% lived in rural areas.

There were 3,380 households in the county, of which 27.0% had children under the age of 18 living with them and 18.7% had a female householder with no spouse or partner present. About 28.7% of all households were made up of individuals and 15.2% had someone living alone who was 65 years of age or older.

There were 3,900 housing units, of which 13.3% were vacant. Among occupied housing units, 80.6% were owner-occupied and 19.4% were renter-occupied. The homeowner vacancy rate was 1.2% and the rental vacancy rate was 11.8%.

=== 2000 census ===
As of the 2000 United States census there were 9,615 people, 3,623 households, and 2,565 families in the county. The population density was 13 people per square mile (5.0 people/km^{2}). There were 4,200 housing units at an average density of 6 units per square mile (2.3/km^{2}). The racial makeup of the county was 99.07% White, 0.10% Black or African American, 0.20% Native American, 0.04% Asian, 0.01% Pacific Islander, 0.18% from other races, and 0.40% from two or more races. 0.43% of the population were Hispanic or Latino of any race. 69.8% were of German and 5.1% American ancestry.

There were 3,623 households, out of which 34.80% had children under the age of 18 living with them, 63.60% were married couples living together, 4.30% had a female householder with no husband present, and 29.20% were non-families. 27.00% of all households were made up of individuals, and 15.70% had someone living alone who was 65 years of age or older. The average household size was 2.60 and the average family size was 3.20.

The county population contained 29.40% under the age of 18, 6.00% from 18 to 24, 24.20% from 25 to 44, 20.30% from 45 to 64, and 20.00% who were 65 years of age or older. The median age was 39 years. For every 100 females there were 100.10 males. For every 100 females age 18 and over, there were 97.10 males.

The median income for a household in the county was $33,435, and the median income for a family was $39,422. Males had a median income of $26,707 versus $18,370 for females. The per capita income for the county was $15,514. About 6.30% of families and 9.10% of the population were below the poverty line, including 10.70% of those under age 18 and 9.70% of those age 65 or over.

== Communities ==
=== Cities ===
- Hartington (county seat)
- Laurel
- Randolph

=== Villages ===
- Belden
- Coleridge
- Fordyce
- Magnet
- Obert
- St. Helena
- Wynot

=== Census-designated places ===
- Aten
- Bow Valley

=== Unincorporated communities ===
- Constance
- Menominee
- St. James
- South Yankton

== Politics ==
Cedar County voters are strongly Republican. In only one national election since 1936 has the county selected the Democratic Party candidate (as of 2024).

United States presidential election results for Cedar County, Nebraska
Year	Republican		Democratic		Third party(ies)	
Year	No.	%	No.	%	No.	%
1900	1,441	47.35%	1,565	51.43%	37	1.22%
1904	1,797	59.37%	1,023	33.80%	207	6.84%
1908	1,627	47.81%	1,732	50.90%	44	1.29%
1912	716	21.74%	1,511	45.87%	1,067	32.39%
1916	1,727	49.47%	1,715	49.13%	49	1.40%
1920	3,906	74.50%	1,279	24.39%	58	1.11%
1924	2,441	39.92%	1,747	28.57%	1,927	31.51%
1928	3,206	49.57%	3,241	50.12%	20	0.31%
1932	1,696	25.19%	4,981	73.99%	55	0.82%
1936	2,394	35.24%	3,781	55.66%	618	9.10%
1940	4,397	62.67%	2,619	37.33%	0	0.00%
1944	3,616	66.29%	1,839	33.71%	0	0.00%
1948	2,616	50.37%	2,578	49.63%	0	0.00%
1952	4,753	77.03%	1,417	22.97%	0	0.00%
1956	3,809	64.70%	2,078	35.30%	0	0.00%
1960	3,060	51.01%	2,939	48.99%	0	0.00%
1964	2,299	42.55%	3,104	57.45%	0	0.00%
1968	2,853	61.53%	1,444	31.14%	340	7.33%
1972	2,995	62.37%	1,807	37.63%	0	0.00%
1976	2,415	50.74%	2,225	46.74%	120	2.52%
1980	3,259	67.09%	1,265	26.04%	334	6.88%
1984	3,298	72.71%	1,201	26.48%	37	0.82%
1988	2,462	58.09%	1,759	41.51%	17	0.40%
1992	1,981	43.85%	1,007	22.29%	1,530	33.86%
1996	2,171	52.20%	1,218	29.29%	770	18.51%
2000	2,989	70.02%	1,062	24.88%	218	5.11%
2004	3,387	74.67%	1,083	23.88%	66	1.46%
2008	2,912	69.77%	1,190	28.51%	72	1.72%
2012	3,278	75.63%	958	22.10%	98	2.26%
2016	3,532	79.91%	571	12.92%	317	7.17%
2020	4,174	83.23%	725	14.46%	116	2.31%
2024	4,141	83.86%	702	14.22%	95	1.92%

== See also ==
- National Register of Historic Places listings in Cedar County, Nebraska
