= Constance, Nebraska =

Unincorporated community in Nebraska, United States

- Unincorporated Community
- Location within Nebraska Location within the United States
- Coordinates: 42.7°N 97.4°W
- Country: United States
- State: Nebraska
- County: Cedar

Constance is an unincorporated community in Cedar County, Nebraska, United States.

== History ==
A post office was established at Constance in 1888, and remained in operation until it was discontinued in 1909.
