= Gavins Point National Fish Hatchery =

Fish hatchery in the United States

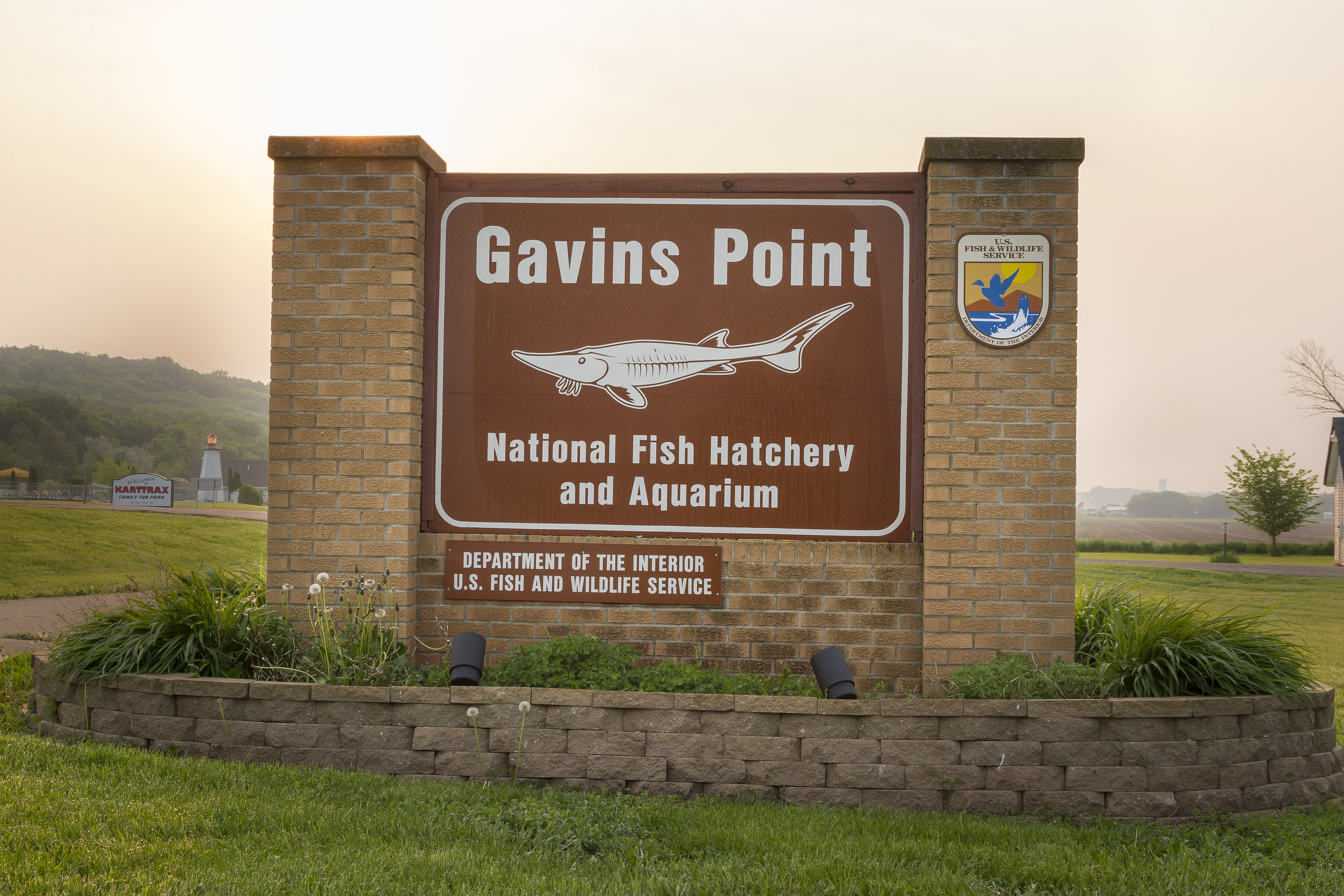

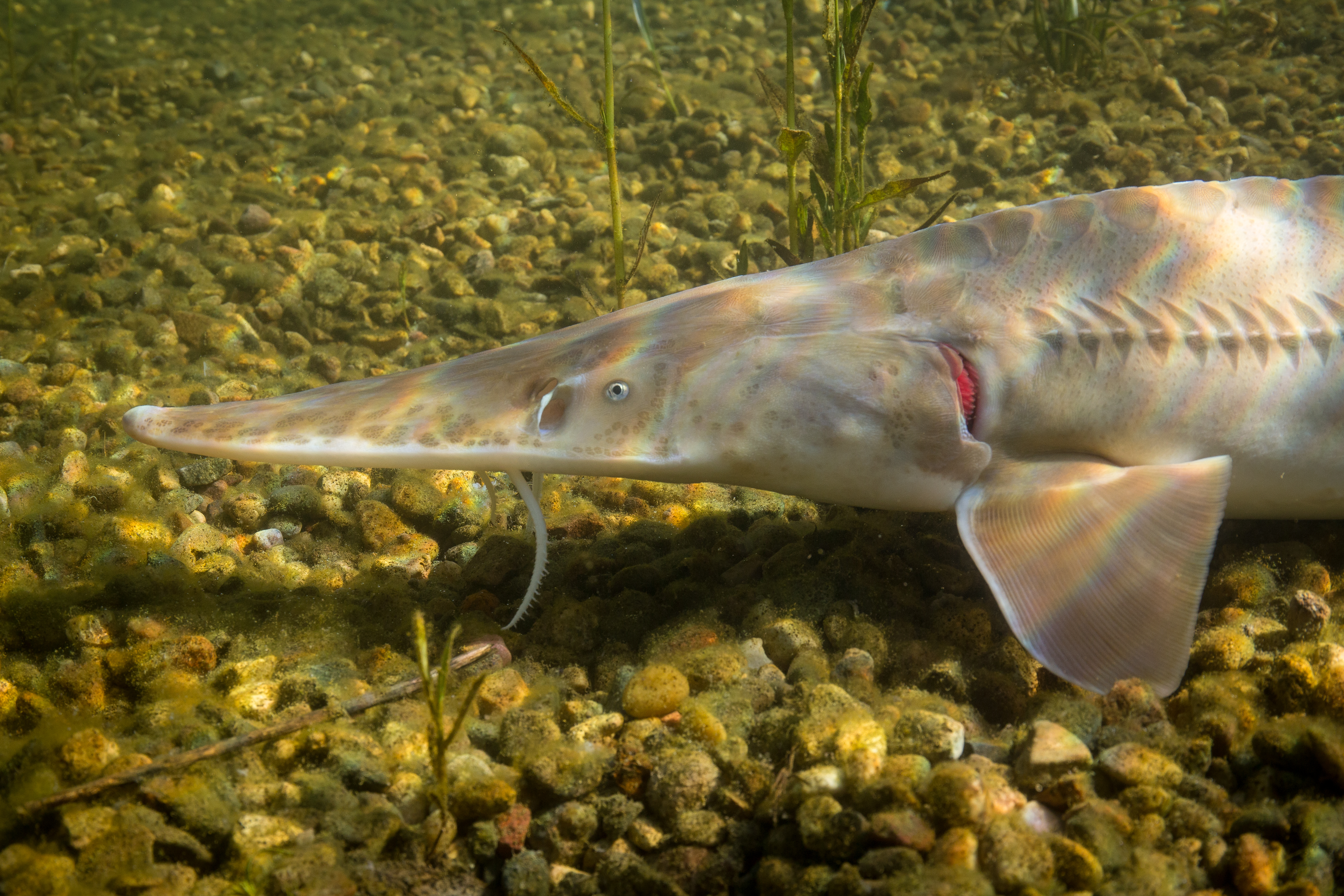
- Pallid sturgeon (Scaphirhynchus albus), an Endangered species that is reared at Gavins Point National Fish Hatchery.

- Location within South Dakota Location within the United States
- Location: Yankton, South Dakota, United States
- Coordinates: 42.871919°N 97.476710°W
- Named for: Gavins Point Dam, nearby U.S. Army Corps of Engineers dam on the Missouri River.
- Governing body: United States Fish and Wildlife Service
- Website: www.fws.gov/fish-hatchery/gavins-point

The Gavins Point National Fish Hatchery is a fish hatchery administered by the United States Fish and Wildlife Service located approximately 4 miles (6.4 km) west of Yankton, in Yankton County, South Dakota, in the United States. The hatchery is located just below Gavins Point Dam, near the Missouri River.

The fish hatchery was built by the United States Army Corps of Engineers, following construction of Gavins Point Dam. The purpose of the hatchery is to help maintain fisheries in the Missouri River Basin, following impacts to natural river flows and loss of habitat due to development and channelization of the Missouri River Basin.

Hatchery staff rear threatened and endangered fish species, including the pallid sturgeon and American paddlefish. The hatchery also rears and stocks many game fish species including: walleye, bluegill, yellow perch, rainbow trout, largemouth bass, smallmouth bass, black crappie and others throughout the Missouri River region.

The hatchery complex is open to the public and contains a small exhibit area, administrative offices, two hatching jar batteries, nine indoor cement tanks, workshop, and feed room. Visitors are welcome to view the eggs in the hatching jars and the fish being raised in the tanks. Eight outdoor raceways are used to rear trout and to temporarily hold other species. Six 1/6-acre (0.067-hectare) and thirty 1.3-acre (0.5-hectare) earthen ponds are used to raise cool- and warm-water fish.

== Aquarium ==
A total of 13 indoor tanks display many of the fish, reptile, and amphibian species found in the Missouri River basin, along with informational displays on endangered, threatened, and unusual species. The Aquarium is open to the public daily from May 1 through Labor Day (i.e., the first Monday in September) from 10 a.m. to 5 p.m., and is located just off South Dakota Highway 52.

== Gallery ==
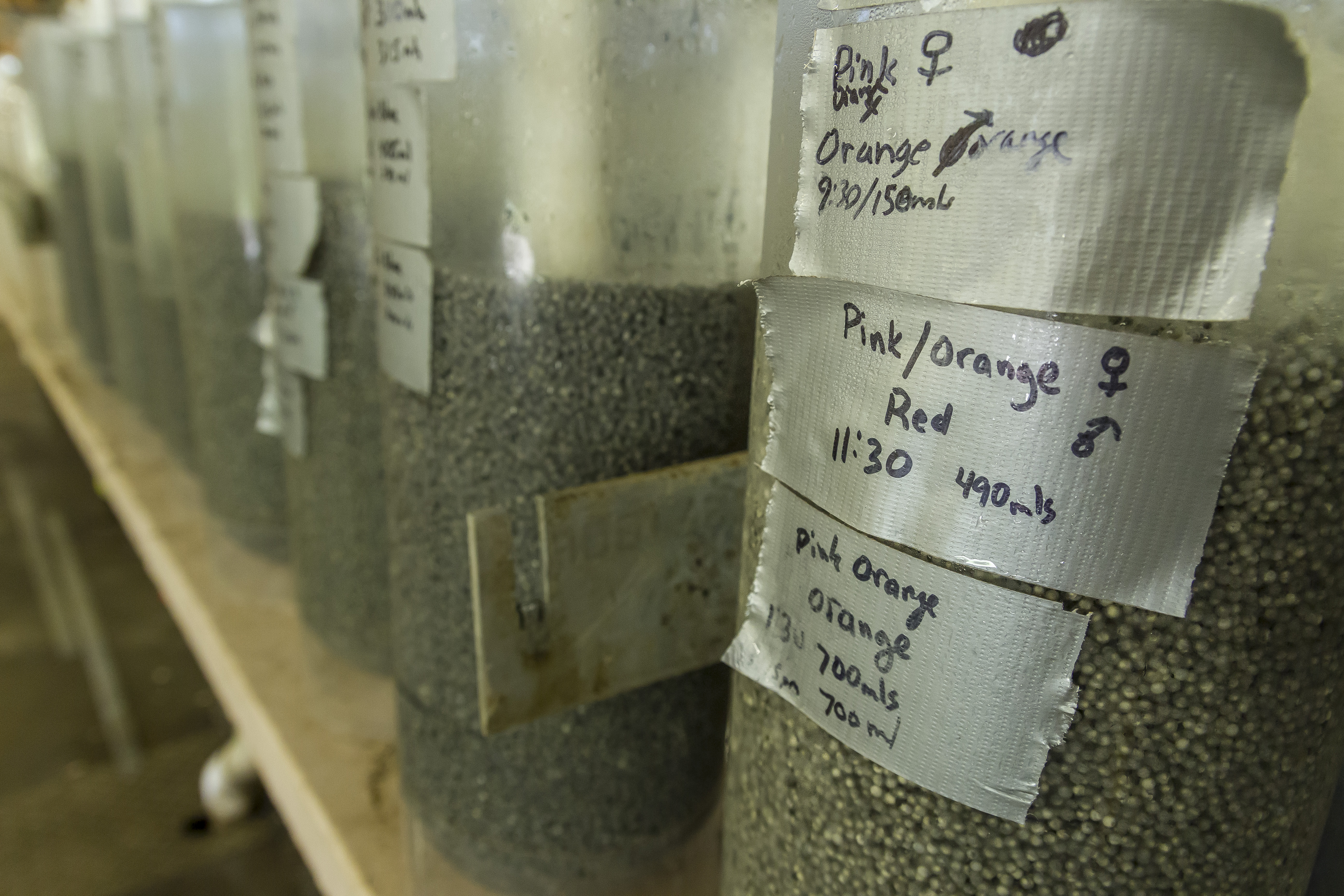

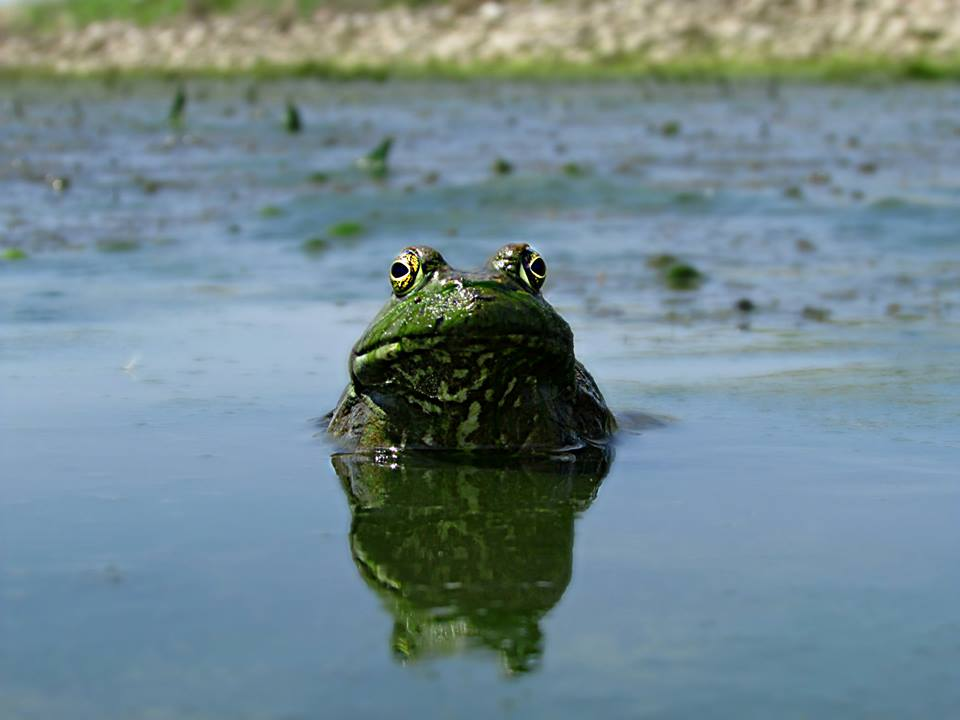

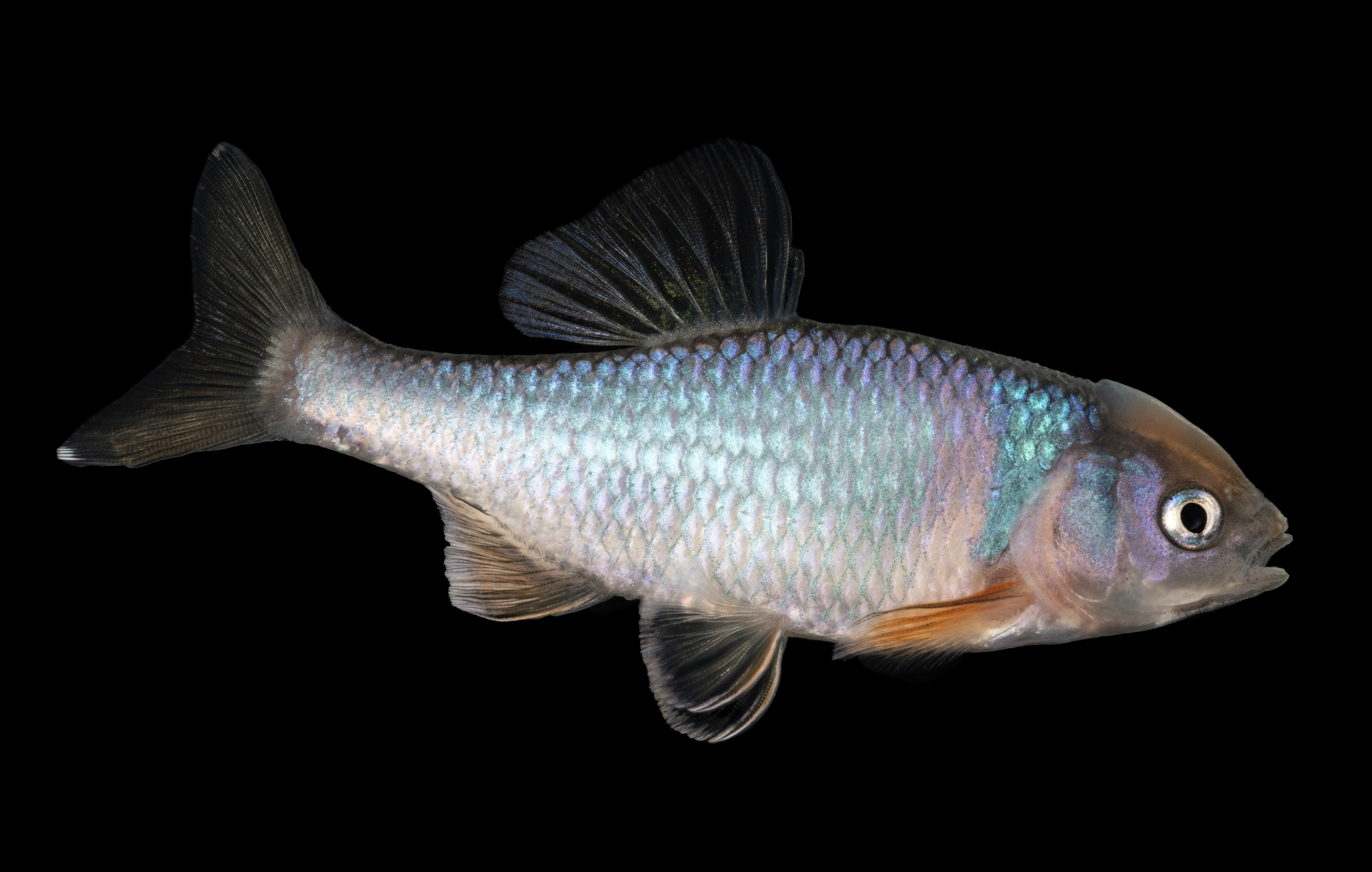

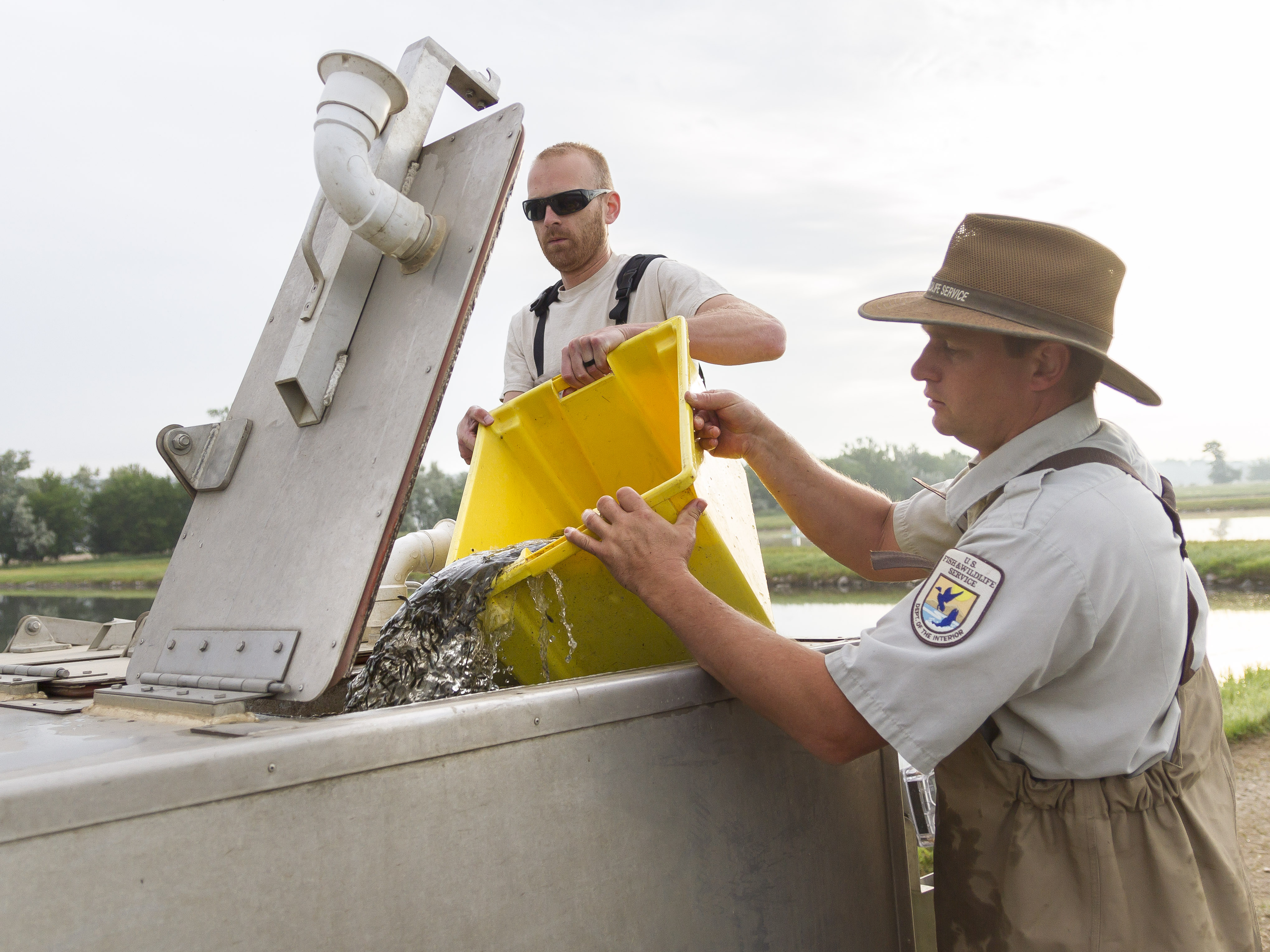

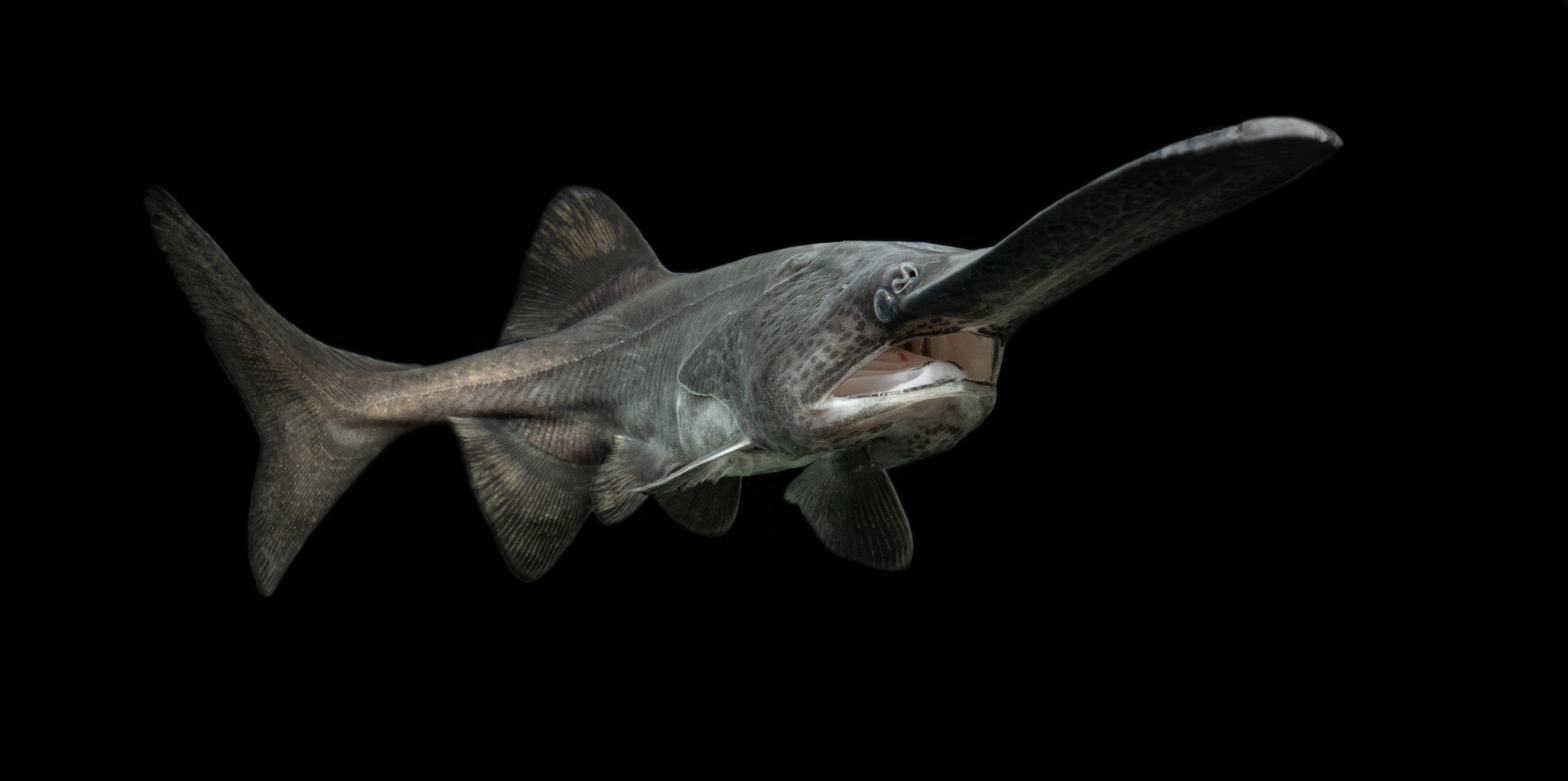

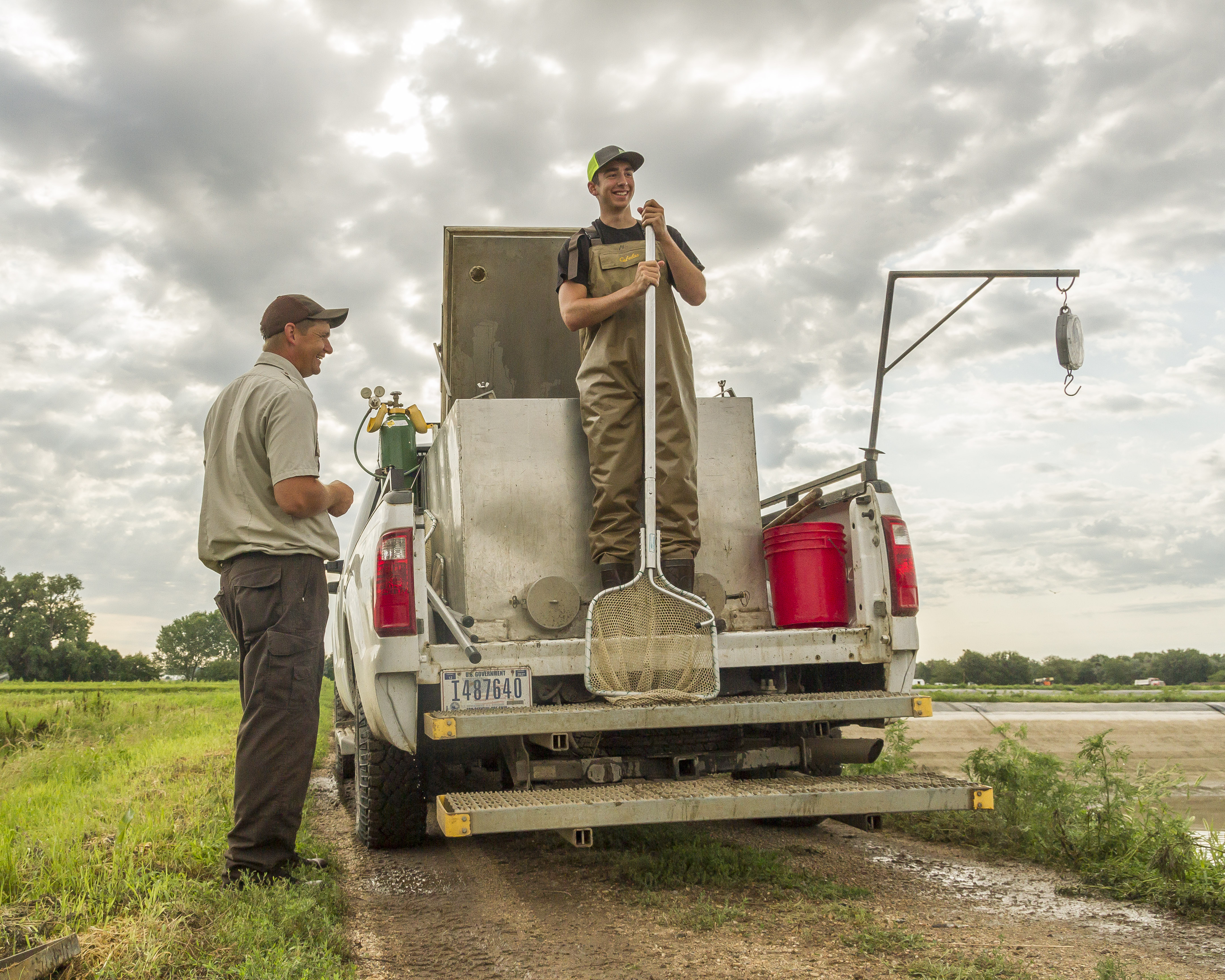

== See also ==
- National Fish Hatchery System
- Missouri River
- List of National Fish Hatcheries in the United States
- List of dams in the Missouri River watershed
