= Calumet Bluff =

Landform in Nebraska, U.S.

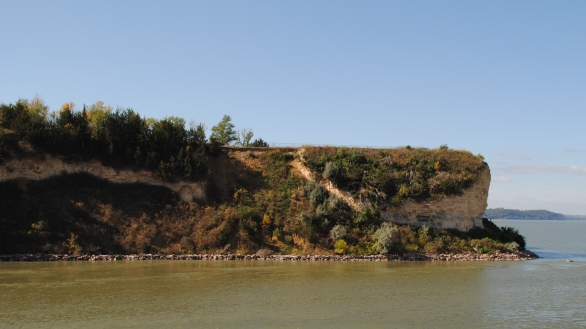
- Calumet Bluff, viewed from Gavins Point Dam

- Location within Nebraska
- Country: United States
- Location: Cedar County, Nebraska, U.S.
- Coordinates: 42°51′43″N 97°29′06″W
- Website; U.S. Army Corps of Engineers - Gavins Point Dam / Lewis and Clark Lake

Calumet Bluff is a hill about 180 feet high overlooking Lewis and Clark Lake and the Missouri River in Cedar County, Nebraska, U.S., where the Lewis and Clark Expedition held its first council with the Sioux Indians for two days in 1804. Today the Bluff forms the right or south abutment of the Gavins Point Dam. The U.S. Army Corps of Engineers maintains the Lewis and Clark Visitor Center and the Gavins Point Project Administration Offices on Calumet Bluff overlooking the dam.

== History ==
The Lewis and Clark Expedition's Corps of Discovery camped below Calumet Bluff during the period of August 28 to September 1, 1804. In his diary, Clark noted the bluff was "Called White Bear Clift, one of those animals haveing been killed in a whole in it[sic]." The bluff is often called "White Bear Cliff" in historical records, but is now more commonly called Calumet Bluffs. A "Calumet" refers to a peace pipe, [this is a misinterpretation, at that time it was a name given to a Golden Eagle; eagles nest on bluffs and their feathers were probably on the peace pipe]. To this day, the bluff matches Lewis and Clark's description of it as "composed of a yellowish red, and brownish clay as hard as chalk."

It was at Calumet Bluff that the Corps had their first encounter with the Yankton-Sioux Tribe on August 30, 1804, meeting with them for two days. Folklore claims that a male child was born into the Yankton tribe while Lewis and Clark were meeting with them on Calumet Bluff. When he heard this, Capt. Lewis had the child brought forward and wrapped him in an American flag. Lewis predicted that the boy would become a leader of his tribe and a friend of the white men. The child grew up to be the famous Yankton Chief Padaniapapi, or "Struck By The Ree."

Today, Calumet Bluff is a Federally-protected area by the U.S. Army Corps of Engineers (USACE) as a part of the Lewis and Clark Lake - Gavins Point Dam Project and is located along the Lewis and Clark National Historic Trail. The USACE maintains two scenic overlooks and the Calumet Bluff Trail - a 0.9 mile hiking trail along the bluffs overlooking the lake.

== Gallery ==
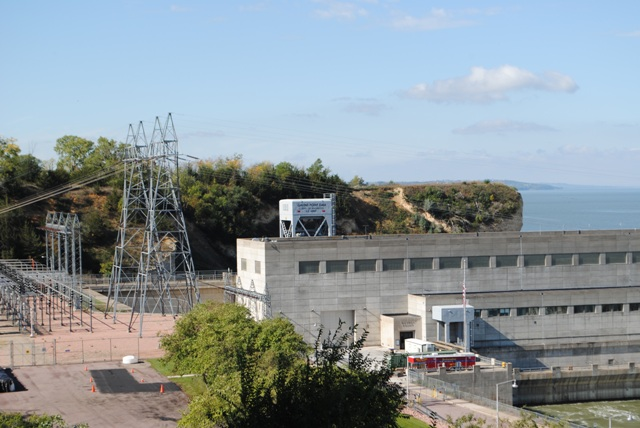
From the east, the Bluff appears behind the Gavins Point Dam, for which it forms the right or south abutment.

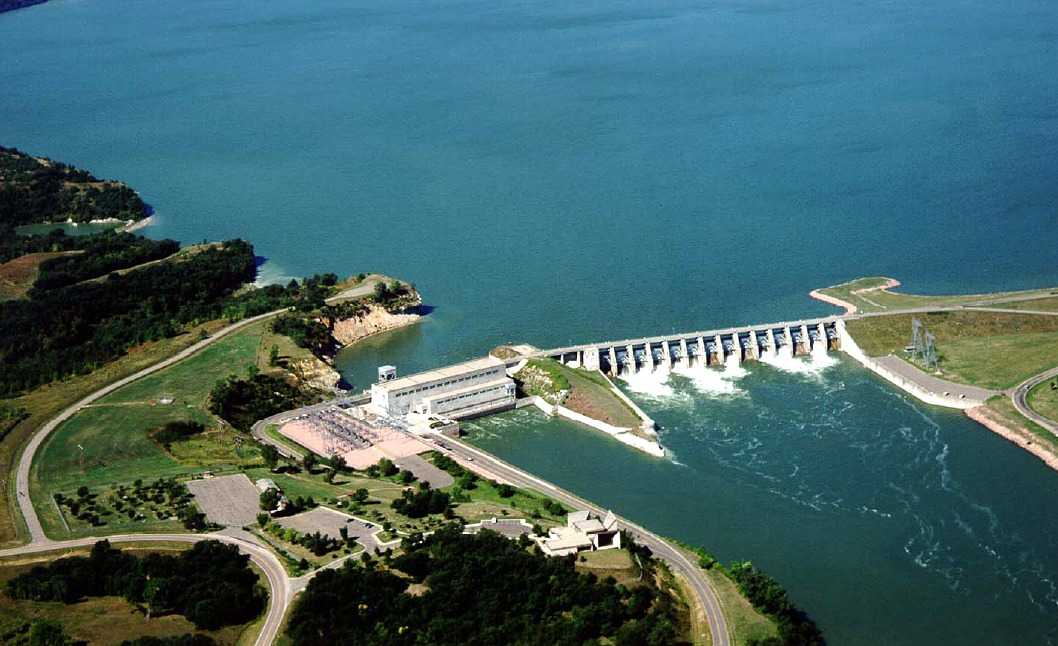
Calumet Bluff can be seen beside the Gavins Point Dam and Power Plant. The Missouri River spills through the dam below the bluff.

View of Lewis and Clark Lake from Calumet Bluff overlook and hiking trail.

== See also ==
- Missouri River
- Lewis and Clark Expedition
- Lewis and Clark Lake
- Gavins Point Dam
- Missouri National Recreational River

== Further Information ==
- "Calumet Bluff, Nebraska," National Park Service, Survey of Historic Sites and Buildings.
- Photographs of Gavins Point Dam—Lewis & Clark Lake, National Park Service
- Lewis and Clark Visitor Center at Calumet Bluff - Lewis and Clark Trail
