= Crofton, Nebraska =

- City
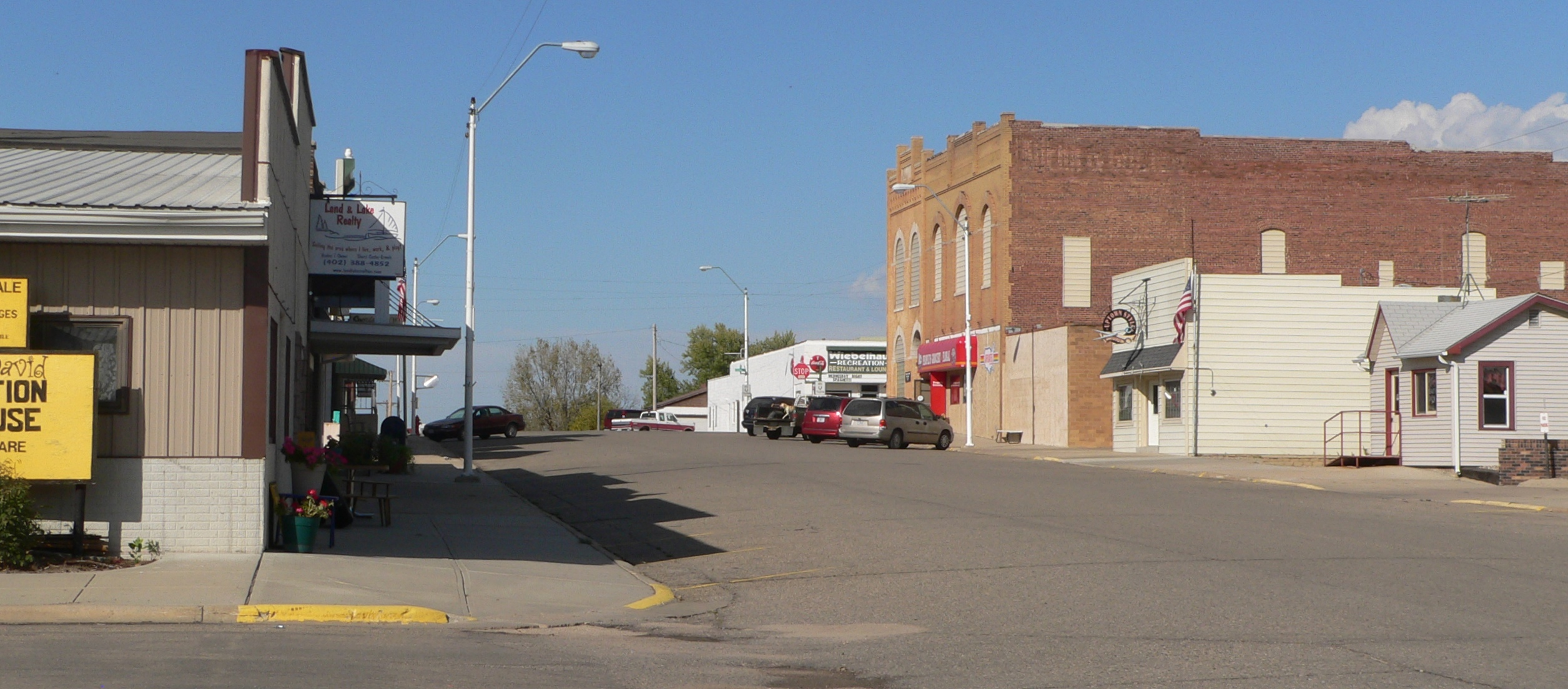
- Downtown Crofton: 2nd Street

- Location of Crofton, Nebraska
- Coordinates: 42°43′54″N 97°29′55″W
- Country: United States
- State: Nebraska
- County: Knox

Area
  - Total: 0.64 sq mi (1.66 km^{2})
  - Land: 0.64 sq mi (1.66 km^{2})
  - Water: 0 sq mi (0.00 km^{2})
- Elevation: 1,440 ft (440 m)

Population (2020)
  - Total: 756
  - Density: 1,182.0/sq mi (456.39/km^{2})
- Time zone: UTC-6 (Central (CST))
  - Summer (DST): UTC-5 (CDT)
- ZIP code: 68730
- Area code: 402
- FIPS code: 31-11440
- GNIS feature ID: 837950
- Website: cityofcrofton.com

Crofton is a city in Knox County, Nebraska, United States. As of the 2020 census, Crofton had a population of 756.

== History ==
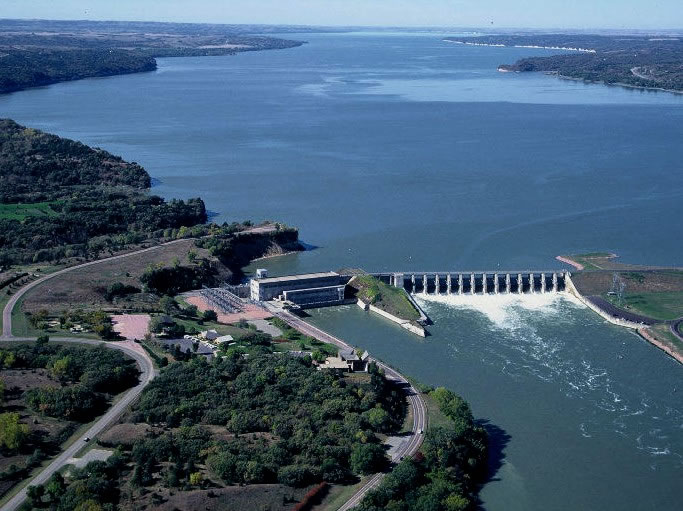
Gavins Point Dam, impounding Lewis and Clark Lake on the Missouri River just north of Crofton.

Crofton was platted in 1892. The city was named after Crofton Court, England, the former estate of a railroad promoter.

Gavins Point Dam was constructed from 1952 to 1957 by the U.S. Army Corps of Engineers and impounds Lewis and Clark Lake on the Missouri River. The dam is located approximately 10 miles north of Crofton.

== Geography ==
According to the United States Census Bureau, the city has a total area of 0.64 square miles (1.66 km^{2}), all land.

=== Climate ===
Climate data for Crofton, Nebraska (1991–2020 normals, extremes 1988–present)
Month	Jan	Feb	Mar	Apr	May	Jun	Jul	Aug	Sep	Oct	Nov	Dec	Year
Record high °F (°C)	73 (23)	76 (24)	85 (29)	94 (34)	97 (36)	100 (38)	105 (41)	103 (39)	98 (37)	95 (35)	82 (28)	70 (21)	105 (41)
Mean daily maximum °F (°C)	30.4 (−0.9)	35.0 (1.7)	47.3 (8.5)	59.2 (15.1)	70.5 (21.4)	80.7 (27.1)	85.2 (29.6)	82.8 (28.2)	76.0 (24.4)	61.7 (16.5)	46.4 (8.0)	33.7 (0.9)	59.1 (15.1)
Daily mean °F (°C)	20.2 (−6.6)	24.4 (−4.2)	35.7 (2.1)	47.5 (8.6)	59.2 (15.1)	69.8 (21.0)	74.4 (23.6)	72.1 (22.3)	64.2 (17.9)	50.0 (10.0)	35.8 (2.1)	24.0 (−4.4)	48.1 (8.9)
Mean daily minimum °F (°C)	10.0 (−12.2)	13.8 (−10.1)	24.2 (−4.3)	35.7 (2.1)	47.8 (8.8)	58.9 (14.9)	63.6 (17.6)	61.3 (16.3)	52.5 (11.4)	38.2 (3.4)	25.1 (−3.8)	14.3 (−9.8)	37.1 (2.8)
Record low °F (°C)	−25 (−32)	−32 (−36)	−16 (−27)	−1 (−18)	23 (−5)	38 (3)	42 (6)	42 (6)	26 (−3)	9 (−13)	−16 (−27)	−28 (−33)	−32 (−36)
Average precipitation inches (mm)	0.63 (16)	0.91 (23)	1.58 (40)	3.56 (90)	3.96 (101)	4.26 (108)	3.30 (84)	3.13 (80)	3.19 (81)	2.64 (67)	1.26 (32)	0.91 (23)	29.33 (745)
Average snowfall inches (cm)	6.0 (15)	7.6 (19)	5.9 (15)	5.2 (13)	0.3 (0.76)	0.0 (0.0)	0.0 (0.0)	0.0 (0.0)	0.0 (0.0)	0.8 (2.0)	5.3 (13)	7.3 (19)	38.4 (98)
Average precipitation days (≥ 0.01 in)	6.0	5.6	6.9	9.6	11.2	10.5	8.5	9.1	7.5	7.3	5.2	6.0	93.4
Average snowy days (≥ 0.1 in)	5.5	5.3	4.1	2.3	0.1	0.0	0.0	0.0	0.0	0.6	2.7	5.4	26.0
Source: NOAA

== Demographics ==
Historical population
Census	Pop.	Note	%±
1910	610		—
1920	811		33.0%
1930	733		−9.6%
1940	600		−18.1%
1950	630		5.0%
1960	604		−4.1%
1970	677		12.1%
1980	948		40.0%
1990	820		−13.5%
2000	754		−8.0%
2010	726		−3.7%
2020	756		4.1%
U.S. Decennial Census

=== 2010 census ===
As of the census of 2010, there were 726 people, 319 households, and 203 families living in the city. The population density was 1,134.4 inhabitants per square mile (438.0/km^{2}). There were 361 housing units at an average density of 564.1 per square mile (217.8/km^{2}). The racial makeup of the city was 98.3% White, 1.0% Native American, 0.1% Asian, 0.3% from other races, and 0.3% from two or more races. Hispanic or Latino of any race were 0.8% of the population.

There were 319 households, of which 28.5% had children under the age of 18 living with them, 52.4% were married couples living together, 7.5% had a female householder with no husband present, 3.8% had a male householder with no wife present, and 36.4% were non-families. 33.5% of all households were made up of individuals, and 19.1% had someone living alone who was 65 years of age or older. The average household size was 2.28 and the average family size was 2.90.

The median age in the city was 43.1 years. 25.5% of residents were under the age of 18; 5.9% were between the ages of 18 and 24; 20.6% were from 25 to 44; 25.7% were from 45 to 64; and 22.2% were 65 years of age or older. The gender makeup of the city was 46.3% male and 53.7% female.

=== 2000 census ===
As of the census of 2000, there were 754 people, 321 households, and 206 families living in the city. The population density was 1,161.7 inhabitants per square mile (448.5/km^{2}). There were 348 housing units at an average density of 536.2 per square mile (207.0/km^{2}). The racial makeup of the city was 97.75% White, 0.40% Native American, 0.13% Asian, 0.13% from other races, and 1.59% from two or more races. Hispanic or Latino of any race were 1.19% of the population.

There were 321 households, out of which 30.8% had children under the age of 18 living with them, 56.1% were married couples living together, 6.5% had a female householder with no husband present, and 35.8% were non-families. 35.2% of all households were made up of individuals, and 21.2% had someone living alone who was 65 years of age or older. The average household size was 2.35 and the average family size was 3.07.

In the city, the population was spread out, with 28.0% under the age of 18, 5.2% from 18 to 24, 20.7% from 25 to 44, 25.1% from 45 to 64, and 21.1% who were 65 years of age or older. The median age was 43 years. For every 100 females, there were 88.0 males. For every 100 females age 18 and over, there were 84.7 males.

As of 2000 the median income for a household in the city was $30,667, and the median income for a family was $42,083. Males had a median income of $26,667 versus $17,841 for females. The per capita income for the city was $15,506. About 6.5% of families and 7.7% of the population were below the poverty line, including 3.9% of those under age 18 and 15.2% of those age 65 or over.
