= Hugh Butler (footballer) =

Scottish footballer

Personal information
- Full name: Hugh Butler
- Date of birth: 17 March 1875
- Place of birth: St Rollox, Scotland
- Date of death: 19 May 1939 (aged 64)
- Place of death: Cambuslang, Scotland
- Position: Inside right

Senior career*
Years	Team	Apps	(Gls)
1896–1900	Queen's Park	2	(0)
- * Club domestic league appearances and goals

Hugh Butler (17 March 1875 – 19 May 1939) was a Scottish amateur footballer who played as an inside right in the Scottish League for Queen's Park.

== Personal life ==
Butler worked as an iron manufacturer's clerk. He served as a private in the Cameronians (Scottish Rifles) and the King's Own Yorkshire Light Infantry during the First World War.

== Career statistics ==
Appearances and goals by club, season and competition
Club	Season	League			Scottish Cup		Other		Total	
Club	Season	Division	Apps	Goals	Apps	Goals	Apps	Goals	Apps	Goals
Queen's Park	1896–97	—			1	0	1 (Note: Appearances in Glasgow Merchants Charity Cup)	0	2	0
Queen's Park	1897–98	—			1	0	4 (Note: 3 appearances and 1 goal in Glasgow Cup, 1 appearance and 1 goal in Glasgow Merchants Charity Cup)	2	5	2
Queen's Park	1898–99	—			0	0	1 (Note: Appearances in Glasgow Cup)	0	2	0
Queen's Park	1900–01	Scottish First Division	2	0	0	0	1	0	3	0
Career total			2	0	2	0	7	2	11	2
