= Red Willow Dam =

- Location within Nebraska Location within the United States
- Country: United States
- Location: Frontier County, Nebraska
- Coordinates: 40°21′31″N 100°40′02″W
- Status: Operationa
- Construction began: 1960
- Opening date: 1962
- Designed by: United States Bureau of Reclamation

Dam and spillways
- Height: 126 ft (38 m)

Reservoir
- Creates: Hugh Butler Lake
- Total capacity: 86,630 acre⋅ft (106,860,000 m^{3})
- Surface area: 1,629 acres (659 ha)
- Normal elevation: 2,510 ft (765 m)

Red Willow Dam (National ID # NE01076) is a dam in Frontier County, Nebraska, about ten miles northwest of McCook.

The earthen dam was constructed from 1960 to 1962 by the United States Bureau of Reclamation, with a height of 126 feet (38 m). It impounds Willow Creek for flood control, part of the Frenchman-Cambridge Division of the Bureau's extensive Pick–Sloan Missouri Basin Program. The dam is owned and operated by the Bureau.

The reservoir it creates, Hugh Butler Lake, has a water surface of 1,629 acres (659 ha), 4,461 acres (1,805 ha) of land, about 35 miles (56 km) of shoreline, and a maximum water capacity of 86,630 acre-feet (106,860,000 m^{3}). Recreation includes fishing (for walleye, crappie, white bass, channel catfish, and wipers, etc.), hunting, boating, camping and hiking. The shore borders Nebraska's Red Willow Reservoir State Recreation Area.
