= Lake McConaughy =

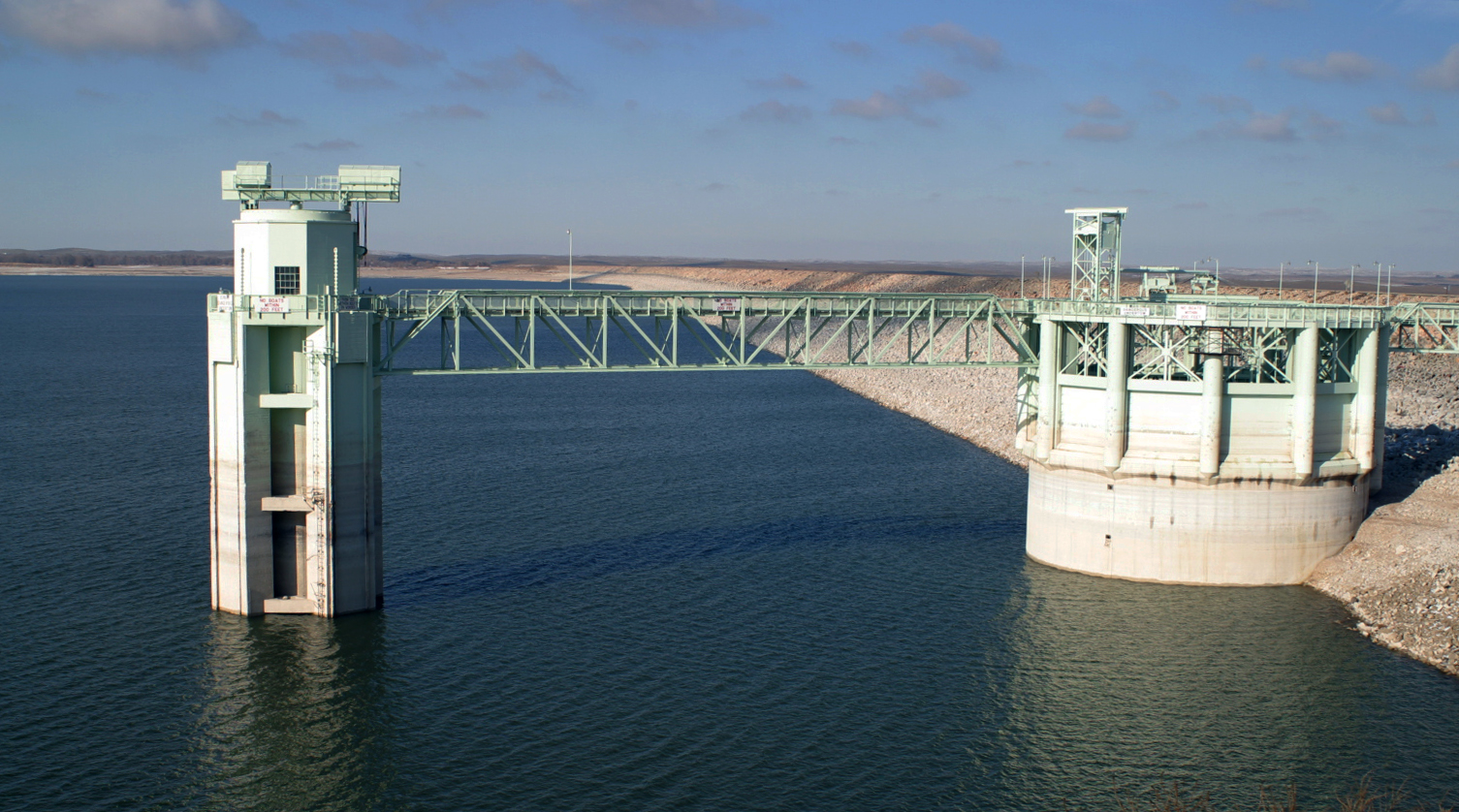
- Outlet tower at Lake McConaughy

- Location within Nebraska Location within the United States
- Location: Keith County, Nebraska, United States
- Coordinates: 41°13′30″N 101°43′00″W
- Type: reservoir
- Basin countries: United States
- Max. length: 22 mi (35 km)
- Max. width: 4 mi (6.4 km)
- Surface area: 35,700 acres (144 km^{2})
- Max. depth: 142 ft (43 m)
- Surface elevation: 3,274 ft (998 m)

Lake McConaughy (known locally and affectionately as Lake Mac) is a reservoir on the North Platte River. It is located 9 miles (14 km) north of Ogallala, Nebraska, United States, near U.S. Highway 26 and Nebraska Highway 61. The reservoir was named for Charles W. McConaughy, a grain merchant and mayor of Holdrege, Nebraska, one of the leading promoters of the project. Although he did not live to see the completion of the project, his leadership and perseverance eventually culminated in a public power and irrigation project that helped Nebraska become one of the nation's leading agricultural states.

== History and overview ==
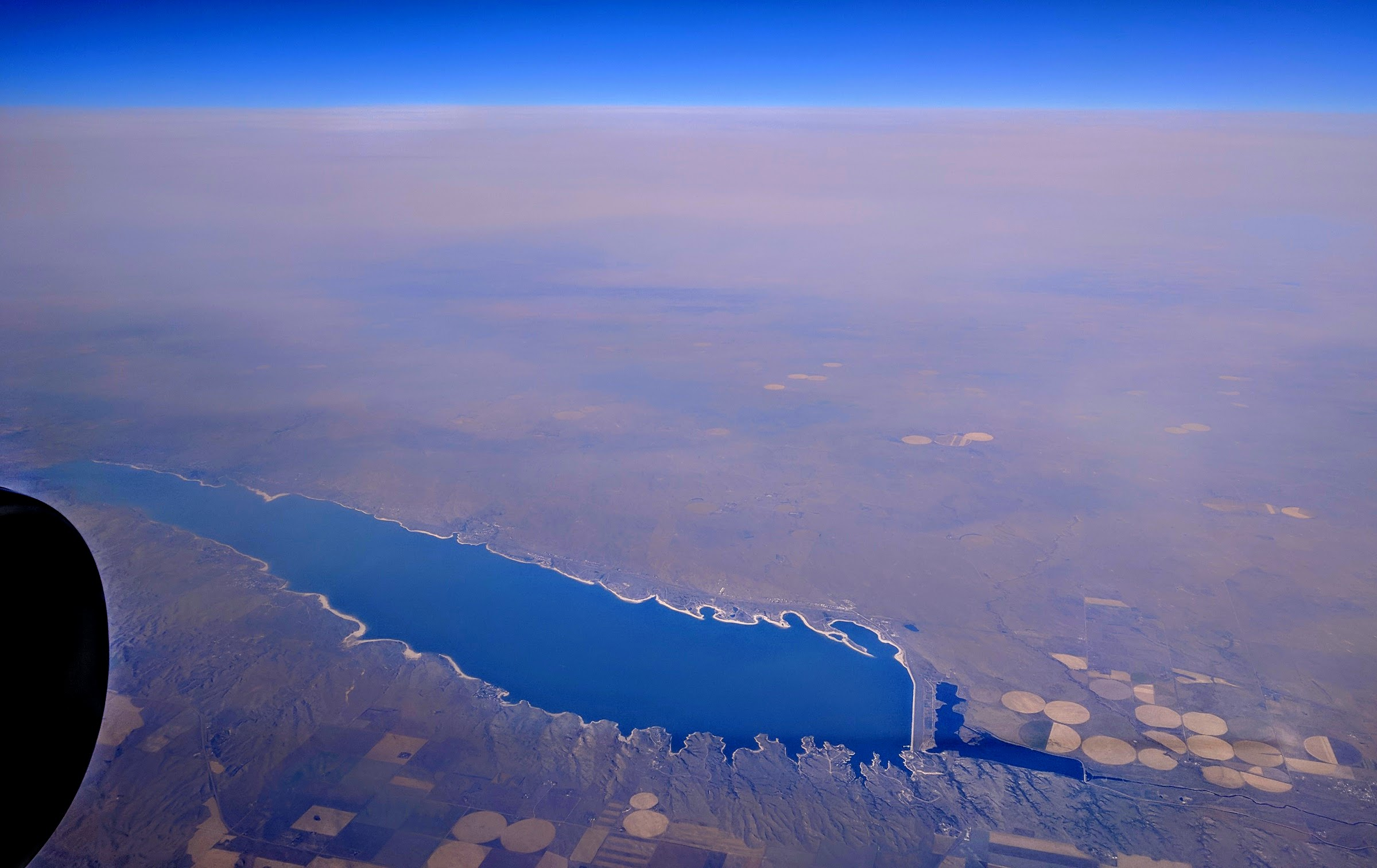
Aerial view of Lake McConaughy from the south

The lake, formed by Kingsley Dam, is a man-made body of water that is 22 miles (35 km) long, 4 miles (6.4 km) wide at its largest point, and 142 feet (43 m) deep near the dam (at full capacity) – it was constructed between 1936 and 1941 and is fed by the North Platte River. When full, the reservoir has a capacity of 1,740,000 acre-feet (2.15 km^{3}), covers 35,700 acres (144 km^{2}) and has 76 miles (122 km) of shoreline, making it the largest reservoir in Nebraska.

Lake McConaughy was constructed to store water for irrigation for The Tri-County, later renamed Central Nebraska Public Power and Irrigation District (CNPPID) hydro-irrigation project. A hydro-electric plant was later added and went online in 1984. The total cost of the Project was $43 million, paid by a $19 million PWA grant and a $24 million federal loan (the federal debt was paid off when the loan was refinanced in 1972; the refinanced portion of the debt was paid off in 1995). The Depression-era construction project provided jobs to more than 1,500 people. CNPPID, a political subdivision of the State of Nebraska, owns and operates the dam and reservoir and an associated hydroplant below the dam.

The source of water for Lake McConaughy is primarily the North Platte River. Water flows into the lake from a 32,500-square-mile (84,000 km^{2}) drainage area west of the dam. U.S. Bureau of Reclamation reservoirs on the North Platte River in Wyoming capture precipitation and snowmelt from the mountains and utilize the water for irrigation and hydroelectric production within the North Platte Projects. Return flows from these projects to the North Platte River make up a significant portion of the inflows to Lake McConaughy.

On the east side of Kingsley Dam is Lake Ogallala, commonly called the 'Little Lake'. Water flows out of Lake McConaughy through the Morning Glory tower, and out the other side of the dam through the hydroelectric plant into Lake Ogallala where the water continues flowing down the North Platte River. This smaller lake has rocky shores, but is well known for great camping and fishing.

Lake McConaughy is also a popular location for fishing, boating, water sports, camping and hunting.

The Nebraska Game and Parks Commission (NGPC) operates a State Recreation Area at the lake. NGPC's offices are at the Lake McConaughy Visitors Center just south of the dam. The Visitor Center contains a water interpretive center, gift shop, theater, and information office.

== Kingsley Dam ==
Kingsley Dam is located at the east end of Lake McConaughy and was the second largest hydraulically filled earthen dam in the world (behind Fort Peck Dam) on the time of its completion. The dam was named for George P. Kingsley, a Minden, Nebraska banker, who worked with C. W. McConaughy to promote the project. The dam was built by pumping sand and gravel from the river bed to form its sides, while pumping a mixture of loess soil and water into the center of the structure to form its watertight core. Seepage of water under the dam is prevented by a wall of interlocked sheet piling driven 30 to 160 ft (49 m) deep and tied into the impervious Brule clay formation that lies beneath the dam. The dam's face is protected by more than a million tons of rock in several layers and more than 180,000 "jackstones," (rebar-reinforced concrete tetrahedrons), each weighing 800 lb (360 kg). The dam is 162 feet (49 m) tall, 3.1 miles (5.0 km) long, and 1,100 feet (340 m) wide at its base.

The Kingsley Hydroplant, which went on-line in 1984, is situated below the south end of the dam.
