= Kingsley Dam =

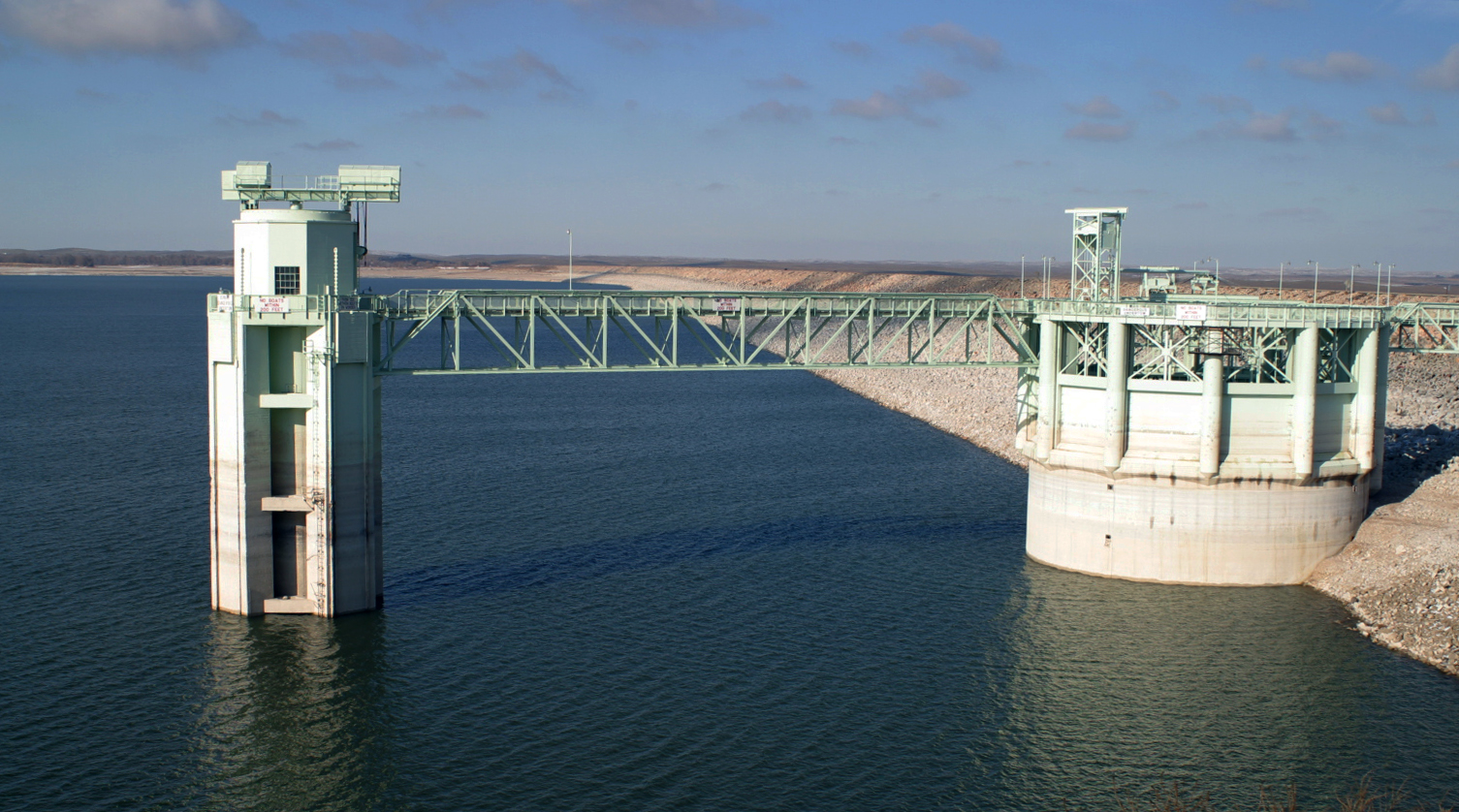
- The outlet tower structure attached to Kingsley Dam used to release water from Lake McConaughy
- Interactive map of Kingsley Dam
- Country: United States
- Location: Keith County, Nebraska
- Coordinates: 41°13′23″N 101°40′20″W
- Opening date: 1941

Dam and spillways
- Height: 162 feet (49 m)
- Length: 3.1 miles (5.0 km)
- Width (base): 1,100 feet (340 m)
- Spillways: Morning Glory Spillway

Reservoir
- Creates: Lake McConaughy
- Total capacity: 1,740,000 acre-feet (2.15 km^{3})
- Catchment area: North Platte River
- Maximum water depth: 142 ft (43 m)

Power Station
- Installed capacity: 50 MW

Kingsley Dam is located on the east side of Lake McConaughy in central Keith County, Nebraska, and was the second largest hydraulic fill dam in the world at the time of its completion. It was built as part of the New Deal project. The dam is 162 feet (49 m) tall, 3.1 miles (5.0 km) long, and 1,100 feet (340 m) wide at its base. On the east side of the dam is Lake Ogallala and on the south side is the Kingsley Hydroelectricity Plant. The Nebraska Game and Parks Commission and Central Nebraska Public Power and Irrigation District are also located in this area. Kingsley Dam, the Kingsley Hydroelectricity Plant, the Morning Glory Spillway, and the Outlet Tower – a large structure near the dam used to release water from the lake – are main visual icons of Lake McConaughy.
