= Gavins Point Dam =

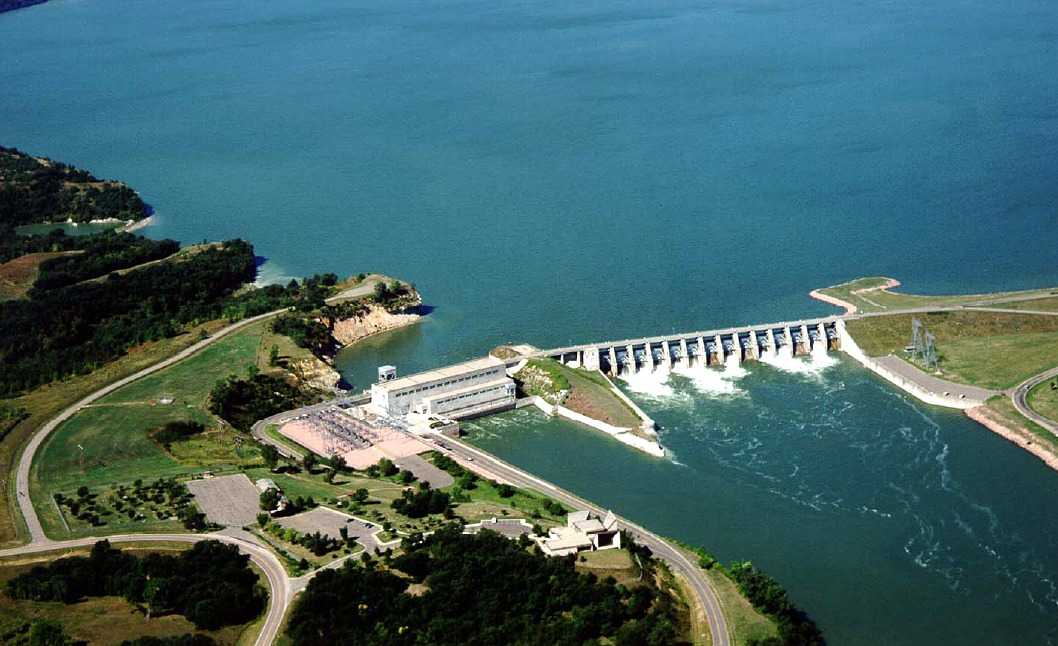
- Gavins Point Dam on the Missouri River, impounding Lewis and Clark Lake.

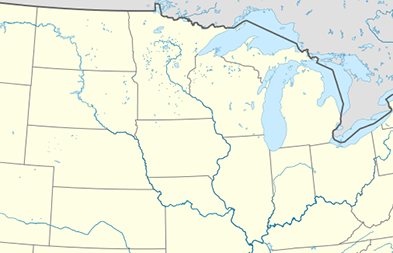
- Location of Gavins Point Dam in the Midwestern United States. Gavins Point Dam (the United States)
- Country: United States
- Location: Cedar County, Nebraska and Yankton County, South Dakota
- Coordinates: 42.849382°N 97.482018°W
- Status: Operational
- Construction began: 1952; 74 years ago
- Opening date: 1957; 69 years ago
- Construction cost: $51 million
- Owners: U.S. Army Corps of Engineers, Omaha District

Dam and spillways
- Type of dam: Embankment, rolled-earth and chalk-fill
- Impounds: Missouri River
- Height: 74 ft (23 m)
- Length: 8,700 ft (2,652 m)
- Elevation at crest: 1,234 ft (376 m)
- Width (crest): 35 ft (11 m)
- Width (base): 850 ft (259 m)
- Dam volume: 7,000,000 cu yd (5,351,884 m^{3})
- Spillways: 14
- Spillway type: Tainter gate
- Spillway capacity: 584,000 cu ft/s (16,500 m^{3}/s) (Design) 345,000 cu ft/s (9,800 m^{3}/s) (Operational)

Reservoir
- Creates: Lewis and Clark Lake
- Total capacity: 492,000 acre⋅ft (606,873,064 m^{3})
- Catchment area: 279,480 sq mi (723,850 km^{2})
- Surface area: 31,400 acres (12,700 ha)
- Maximum length: 25 mi (40 km)
- Maximum water depth: 45 ft (14 m)
- Normal elevation: 1,210 feet msl

Power Station
- Operators: U.S. Army Corps of Engineers (Operator); Western Area Power Administration (marketer)
- Commission date: 1957
- Type: Conventional
- Turbines: 3 x 44 MW Kaplan turbine
- Installed capacity: 132 MW
- Annual generation: 727 million KWh
- Website; U.S. Army Corps of Engineers, Gavins Point Project

Gavins Point Dam is a 1.9-mile-long (3 km) embankment rolled-earth and chalk-fill dam which spans the Missouri River and impounds Lewis and Clark Lake. The dam joins Cedar County, Nebraska with Yankton County, South Dakota a distance of 811.1 river miles (1,305 km) upstream of St. Louis, Missouri, where the river joins the Mississippi River. It is the most downstream dam on the Missouri River.

The dam and hydroelectric power plant were constructed as the Gavins Point Project from 1952 to 1957 by the United States Army Corps of Engineers as part of the Pick-Sloan Plan. The dam is located approximately 4 miles (6.4 km) west or upstream of Yankton, South Dakota.

== History ==
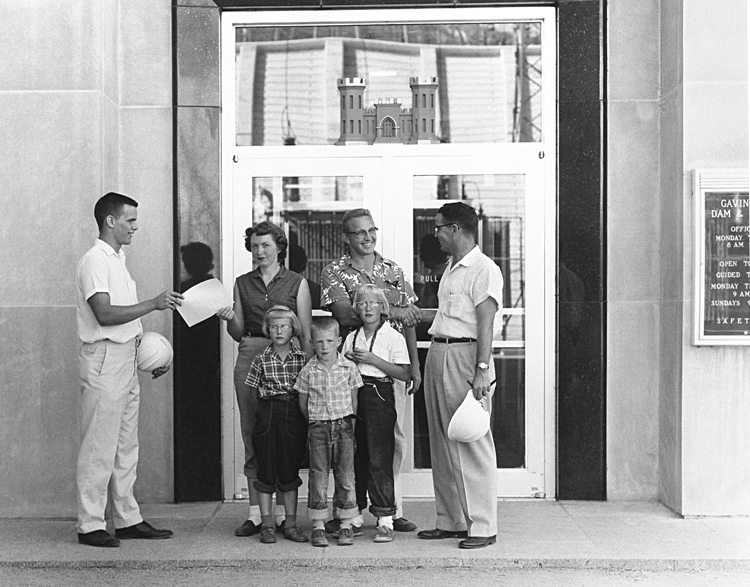
Tom Brokaw greeting the 20,000th visitor to the dam in 1958. Brokaw was once a tour guide at the dam.

Gavins Point Dam was constructed as a part of the Pick–Sloan Missouri Basin Program, authorized by the Flood Control Act of 1944 by Congress. The dam is named after Gavins Point, a bluff along the northern bank of the Missouri River named for an early settler, now within the western end of Lewis & Clark Recreation Area, which was to be the original location of construction of the dam. The location was moved and construction began further downstream along Calumet Bluff because this location offered a shorter span distance and less fill material needed for dam construction, although the project kept the original name.

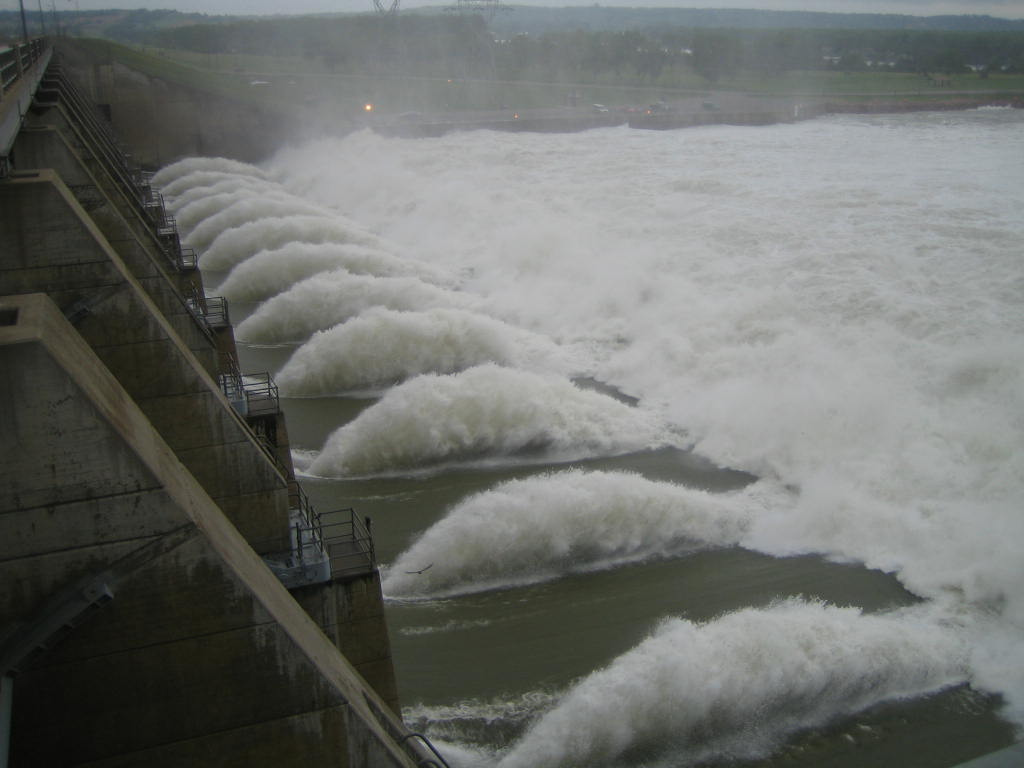
The dam releasing a record 150,000 cubic feet per second (4,200 m^{3}/s) of water on June 14, 2011 as a result of the 2011 Missouri River Floods. The release was more than twice the previous record set in 1997.

During the 2011 Missouri River Flood, the dam released a record water flow of 160,200 cfs, topping the previous record of 70,000 cfs in 1997. During the 2011 flood, the debris damaged the dam and a significant portion of rocks were dislodged from its upstream side. The U.S. Army Corps of Engineers soon began repairs to the dam and its spillway gates. Pressure sensors were also installed in concrete portion of the dam.

== Usage ==
The dam has a hydroelectric power plant with three generators, each having a nameplate capacity of 44,099 kW, for a total of 132.297 MW. The hydroelectric power plant provides enough electricity to supply 68,000 homes. The power generated is sold through the Western Area Power Administration.

The dam operations work in conjunction with the other Pick-Sloan Program Dams to assist with conservation, control, and use of water resources in the Missouri River Basin. The intended beneficial uses of these water resources include flood control, aids to navigation, irrigation, supplemental water supply, power generation, municipal and industrial water supplies, stream-pollution abatement, sediment control, preservation and enhancement of fish and wildlife, and creation of recreation opportunities. Gavins Point is the most downstream dam on the Missouri River, being 811.1 river miles upstream of St. Louis where the river meets the Mississippi River. The next dam upstream is Fort Randall Dam.

== Reservoir ==
See main article: Lewis and Clark Lake

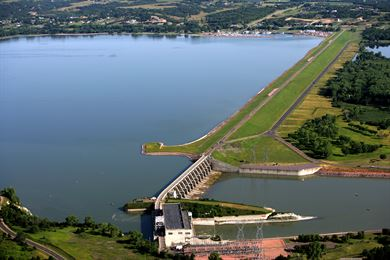
Aerial photo of Gavins Point Dam and Lewis and Clark Lake, looking north.

Gavins Point Dam creates Lewis and Clark Lake, a popular regional tourist destination for water-based recreational opportunities including boating and fishing, along with camping, hiking, and hunting opportunities managed by the State of South Dakota, State of Nebraska, and the U.S. Army Corps of Engineers.

The lake is significantly impacted by sedimentation and siltation issues, diminishing the overall water surface area, water storage capacity, and recreational opportunities. Sediment carried by the Missouri River and Niobrara River is slowed and trapped within the reservoir due to the dam impounding and thus stopping the natural river flow. Studies show approximately 5.1 million tons of sediment are deposited in the lake each year, which contributes to the lake's increasing size of delta area on the western portions of the lake. Approximately 60% of the sediment comes from the Nebraska Sandhills via the Niobrara River. As of 2016, approximately 30% of the lake's overall surface area has diminished due to sedimentation deposits, and some figures project by 2045 approximately 50% of the lake will be diminished due to sedimentation deposits. Presently, there is no plan or solution to remove or slow the progression of the siltation within the lake.

== See also ==
- Lewis and Clark Lake
- Pick–Sloan Plan
- List of crossings of the Missouri River
- List of dams in the Missouri River watershed
- Water Resources Development Act
