= Landmarks of the Nebraska Territory =

Landmarks of the Nebraska Territory were important to settlers on the Oregon, California and Mormon trails. While the majority of the landmarks were close to the Platte River, others were spread across the state.

== The trails ==
Landmarks in the Nebraska Territory were often related to their proximity to the several trails that crossed the area. The Oregon and California Trails entered the Territory from the Kansas Territory Kansas at Gage County. They continue west/northwesterly across present-day Nebraska. The Mormon Trail entered the Nebraska Territory at Cutler's Park, across the Missouri River from Kanesville, Iowa. It continued westerly along the Elkhorn and Platte Rivers.

== Landmarks ==
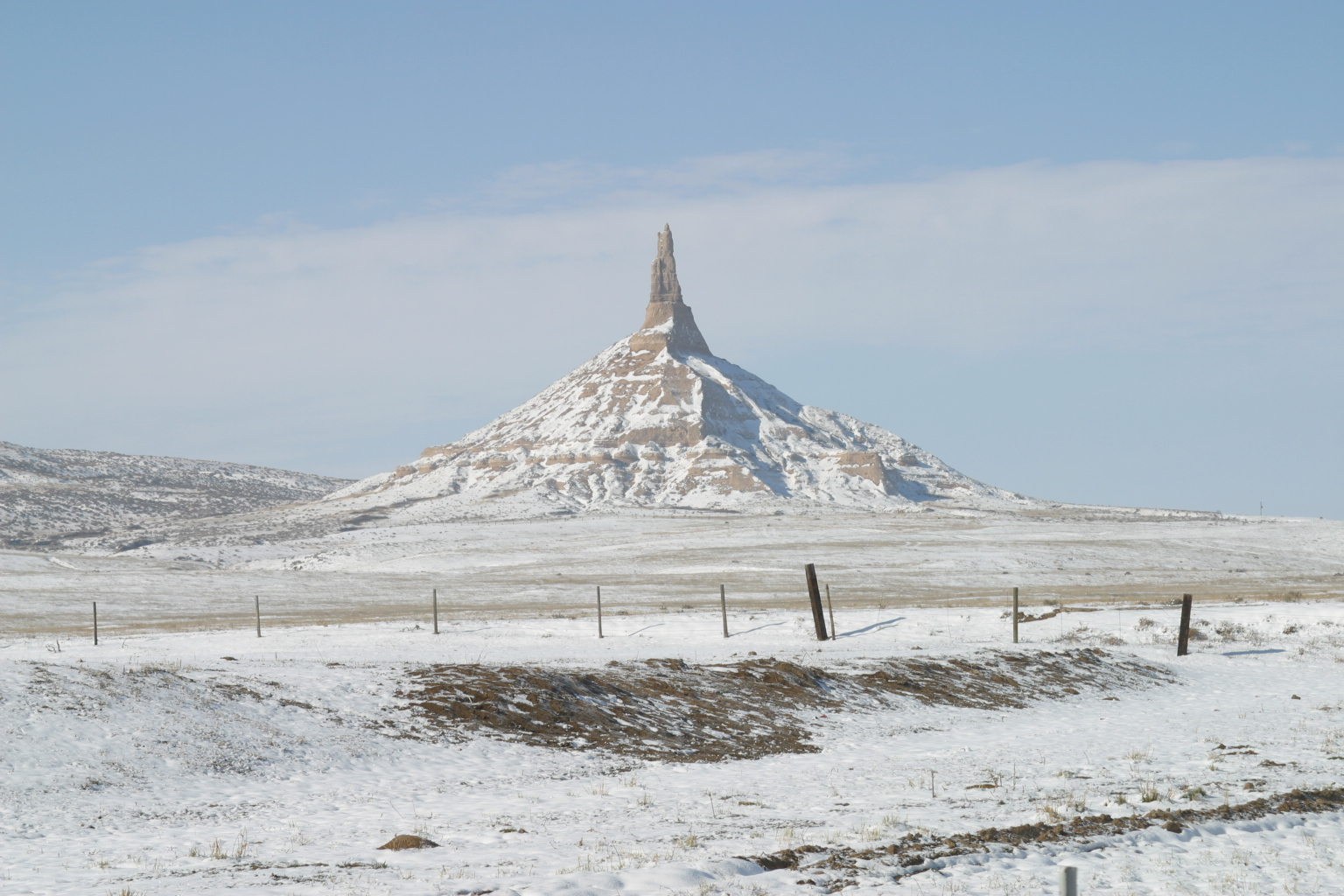
Chimney Rock, 2002

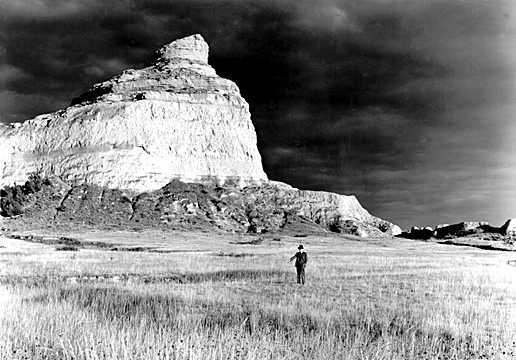
Scotts Bluff, 1938. Photo: George A. Grant

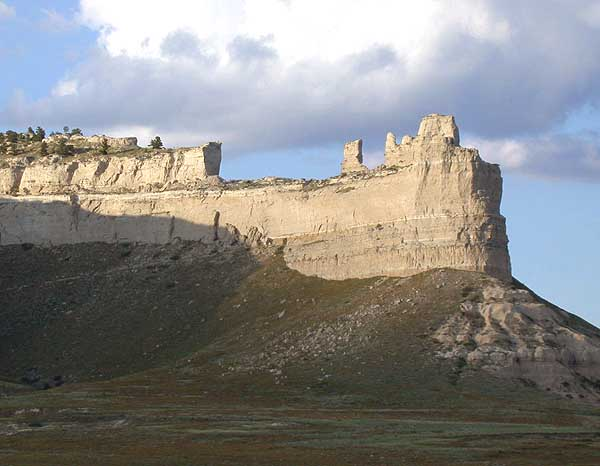
Saddle Rock in Scotts Bluff National Monument

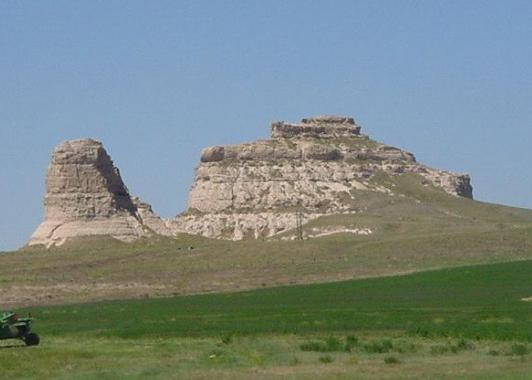
Courthouse and Jail Rocks

Landmarks of the Nebraska Territory (East-to-west order)
Name	Nearest town	Details
Audubon Spring Creek Prairie	Denton	
Rock Creek Station	Endicott	A Pony Express Station and now a State Historical Park. Setting of an 1861 gunfight between David McCanles and Wild Bill Hickok.
Oak Grove Station	Oak	A Pony Express station is marked by a monument commemorating an 1864 Indian battle called the Little Blue Raid.
Simonton-Smith wagon train attack site	Hastings	First fatal action of the Indian War of 1864.
Spring Ranch	Pauline	A stagecoach stop, trading post and village.
Susan Hail Grave	Kenesaw	Died 2 June 1852, probably of cholera. Many emigrants, including William Woodhams, described her grave. Her grief-stricken husband returned to St. Joseph for a tombstone and moved it by wheelbarrow back to this location.
Fort Kearny (Fort Childs)	Kearney	An open fort made of sod and adobe, and located south of the Platte River.
Midway Station	Gothenburg	Built in 1855 as a trading post before being used as an Overland stage station and Pony Express station. Mark Twain referenced it in his 1872 novel, Roughing It, as did Charles Dawson and Mattes & Henderson.
Cottonwood Springs	Maxwell	The only good water along the trails in either direction.
Fort McPherson	Maxwell	Important during the Indian Wars. Among the dead at the Fort McPherson National Cemetery is Spotted Horse. Also a monument to the 1854 Grattan Massacre.
O'Fallon's Bluff	Sutherland	On the south bank of the South Platte River, location of a stage station and military post.
Beauvais Trading Post (Starr Ranch)	Brule	An 1859 trading post was established by Geminien P. Beauvais, and the famous pre-1859 Upper Crossing or Old California Crossing.
California Crossing	Brule	A South Platte River crossing.
Windlass Hill and Ash Hollow State Historical Park	Big Springs- Lewellen-area	
Rachel Pattison Grave at Ash Hollow Cemetery	Lewellen	
John Hollman Grave	Oshkosh	
Courthouse and Jail Rocks	Bridgeport	Courthouse Rock is a sandstone outcropping south of the Oregon Trail. A smaller feature to the east is called the Jail Rock.
Chimney Rock National Historic Site	Bayard	A clay and sandstone column resembling a tall factory chimney that is over 300 feet (91 m) today.
Rebecca Winters' Gravesite	Scottsbluff	Rebecca Winters, a Mormon pioneer, died during 1852 en route to the Utah Territory.
Scotts Bluff	Gering	A bluff over the North Platte River, now within Scotts Bluff National Monument.
Mitchell Pass	Gering	A gap in the Wildcat Hills used by travelers on the Emigrant Trail after 1851 after improvement by the United States Army Corps of Engineers, now within Scotts Bluff National Monument.
Pierre D. Papin Grave	Gering	Pierre was a well known trapper who died at nearby Fort John in May 1853.
Robidoux Pass and Trading Post	Gering	Small log trading post was established by Joseph E. Robidoux in late 1848.

== See also ==
- History of Nebraska
