= Nebraska panhandle =

- Map of Nebraska highlighting the panhandle

Area
  - Land: 14,180.97 sq mi (36,728.5 km^{2})

Population (2019)
  - Total: 82,962
  - Density: 5.9/sq mi (2.3/km^{2})

The Nebraska panhandle is an area in the western part of the state of Nebraska and one of several U.S. state panhandles, or elongated geographical regions that extend from their main political entity.

The Nebraska panhandle is two-thirds as high and a quarter as broad as the rest of the state is. It is approximately 100 miles (160 km) east to west and 125 miles (200 km) north to south. The Nebraska panhandle roughly encompasses the area in Nebraska between 102° and 104°W longitude and 41° and 43°N latitude. It comprises 11 counties with a combined land area of 14,181 square miles (36,730 km^{2}), or about 18.45 percent of the state's land. Its population as of the 2010 Census was 87,789 inhabitants, or about 4.70 percent of the state's population. Its largest city is Scottsbluff, in the west-central part of the area.

== Counties ==
- Banner
- Box Butte
- Cheyenne
- Dawes
- Deuel
- Garden
- Kimball
- Morrill
- Scotts Bluff
- Sheridan
- Sioux

== Cities and towns ==
Major cities in the Nebraska panhandle include:

- Alliance
- Bridgeport
- Chadron
- Hemingford
- Kimball
- Mitchell
- Scottsbluff - Gering
- Sidney

== Population shifts ==
As part of a general trend in migration from rural to metropolitan areas, most counties in the Nebraska panhandle have seen population decreases in recent decades; however, Scotts Bluff, Dawes, and Cheyenne counties increased their populations from the years 1990 to 2000 and again from 2000 to 2010. While emigration from the panhandle exceeds immigration, a study coordinated by the University of Nebraska–Lincoln surveyed and interviewed a sample of newcomers to the region in order to understand their demographic makeup and reasons for relocation. Results indicated that immigrants to the Nebraska panhandle were on average younger and had higher average incomes and educational levels than other area residents; immigrants cited a "simpler pace of life," reduced congestion, and lower costs of living among their reasons for relocation.

== Points of interest ==
The Nebraska panhandle has a great deal of geographical and geological diversity; the region itself is made up of several smaller areas. Areas, features, and sites of interest in the Nebraska panhandle include:

- Agate Fossil Beds National Monument
- Carhenge
- Chadron State Park
- Sandhills
- Chimney Rock
- Fort Robinson
- Pine Ridge
- Rush Creek Ranch
- Toadstool Geologic Park
- Scotts Bluff National Monument
- Wildcat Hills
- North Platte River

The Nebraska panhandle borders the states of South Dakota, Wyoming and Colorado and is in the Mountain Time Zone.
