= Fort Mitchell, Nebraska =

Coordinates: 41°51.552′N 103°43.397′W

- Fort Mitchell Site
- U.S. National Register of Historic Places
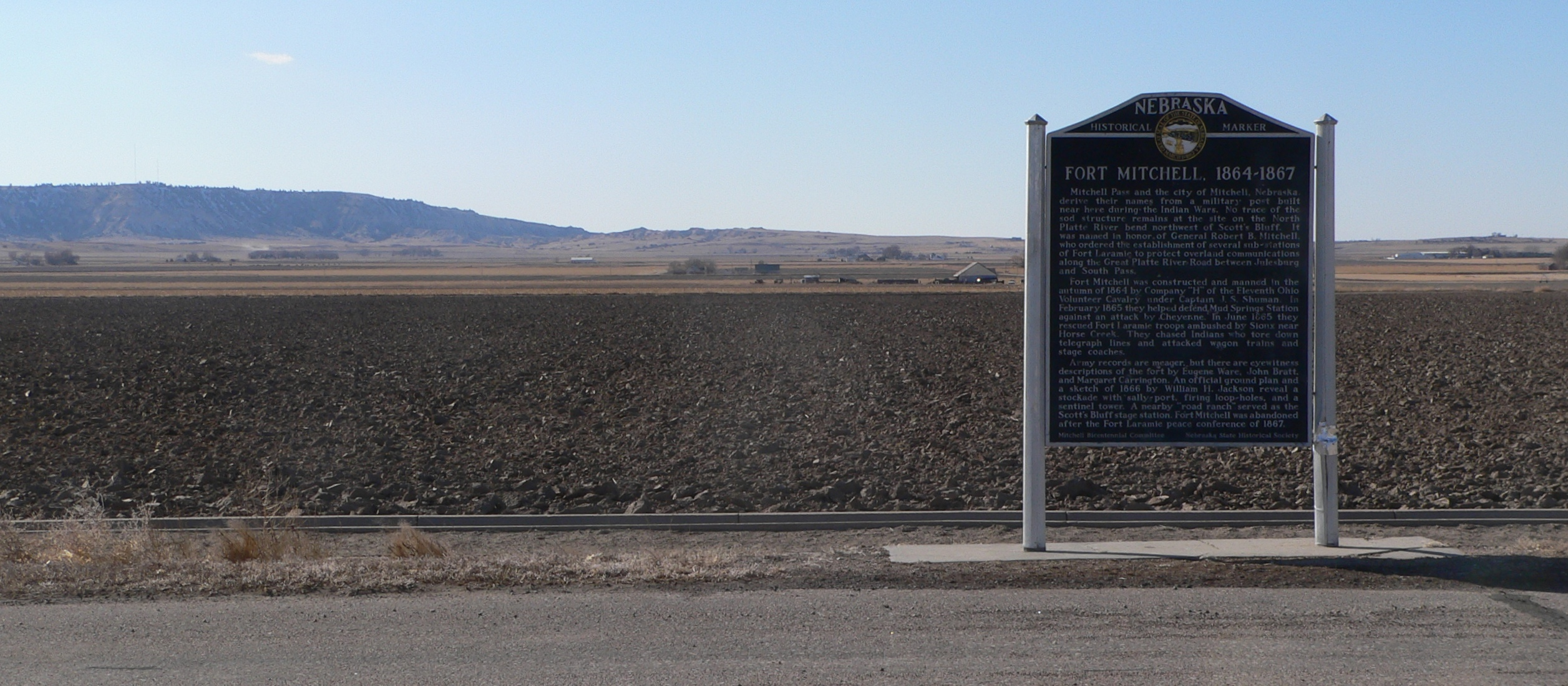
- Nebraska historical marker beside Nebraska Highway 92, commemorating Fort Mitchell.

- Location within Nebraska Location within the United States
- Nearest city: Scottsbluff, Nebraska
- Area: 20 acres (8.1 ha)
- Built: 1864
- NRHP reference No.: 78001713
- Added to NRHP: June 07, 1978

Fort Mitchell, Nebraska, was an Army fort in service from 1864 to 1867, located in present-day Scotts Bluff County, Nebraska.

First constructed northwest of Mitchell Pass as Camp Shuman, Fort Mitchell was manned in the autumn of 1864 by Company "H" of the 11th Ohio Volunteer Cavalry under Captain J. S. Shuman. It was named in honor of General Robert B. Mitchell, who ordered the establishment of this post to protect traffic along the Great Platte River Road between Julesburg and South Pass and the nearby Scott's Bluff stage station. Fort Mitchell was abandoned after the Fort Laramie peace conference of 1867.

The ground plan of Fort Mitchell consisted of a stockade with a sally port, firing loopholes, and a sentinel tower. Today no trace of the sod structure remains at the site west of the North Platte River bend northwest of Scott's Bluff.

Mitchell Pass and the city of Mitchell, Nebraska, derive their names from this military post.
