= Wildcat Hills =

Landform in Nebraska, U.S.

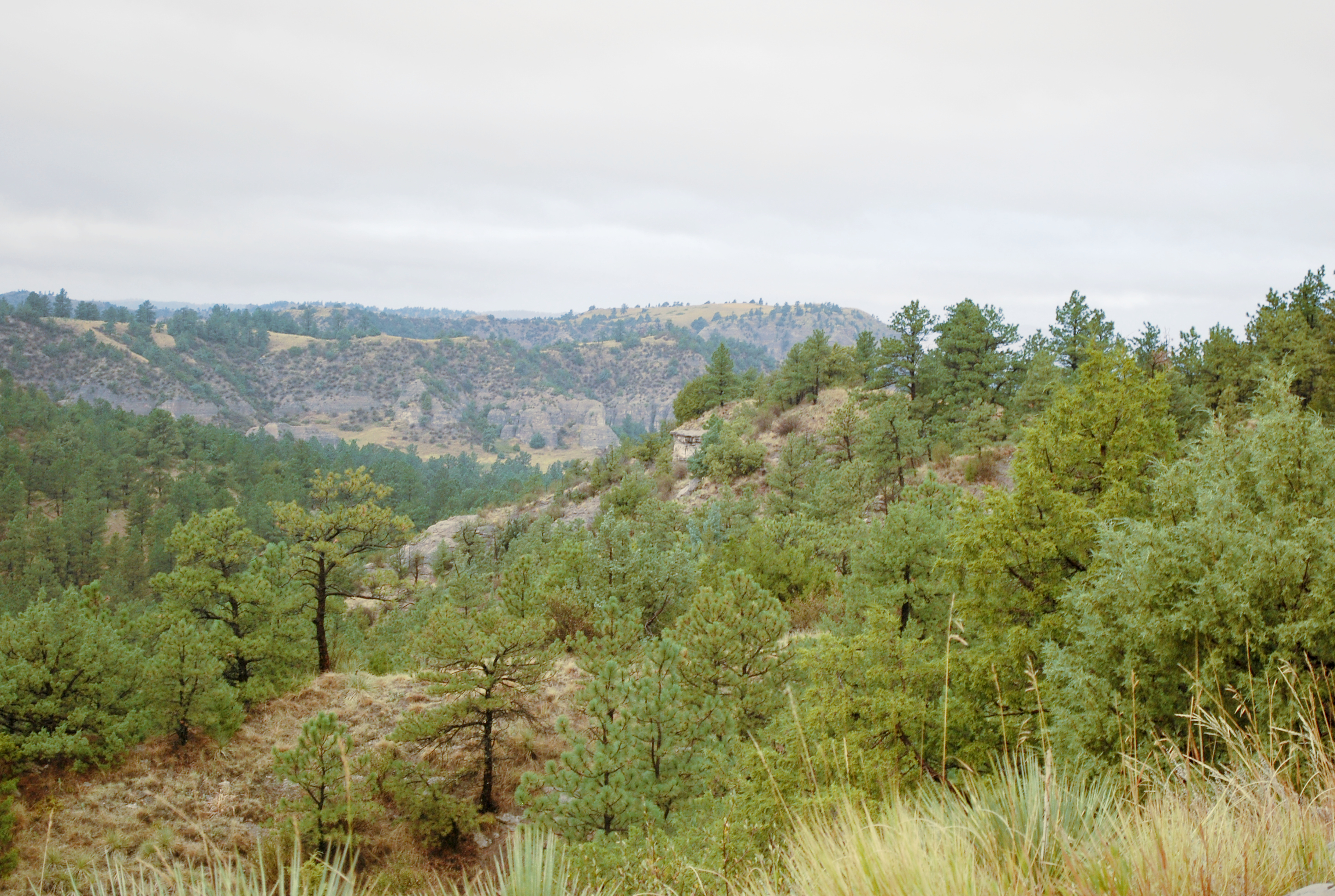
View from one of the stone shelters at Wildcat Hills State Recreation Area.

The Wildcat Hills are an escarpment between the North Platte River and Pumpkin Creek in the western Panhandle, in the state of Nebraska in the Great Plains region of the United States. Located in Banner, Morrill, and Scotts Bluff counties, the high tableland between the streams has been eroded by wind and water into a region of forested buttes, ridges and canyons that rise 150 to 300 m (490 to 980 ft) above the surrounding landscape.

Chimney Rock, Scotts Bluff, and Courthouse and Jail Rocks are outcrops along the northern and western edges of the Wildcat Hills.

== Ecology ==
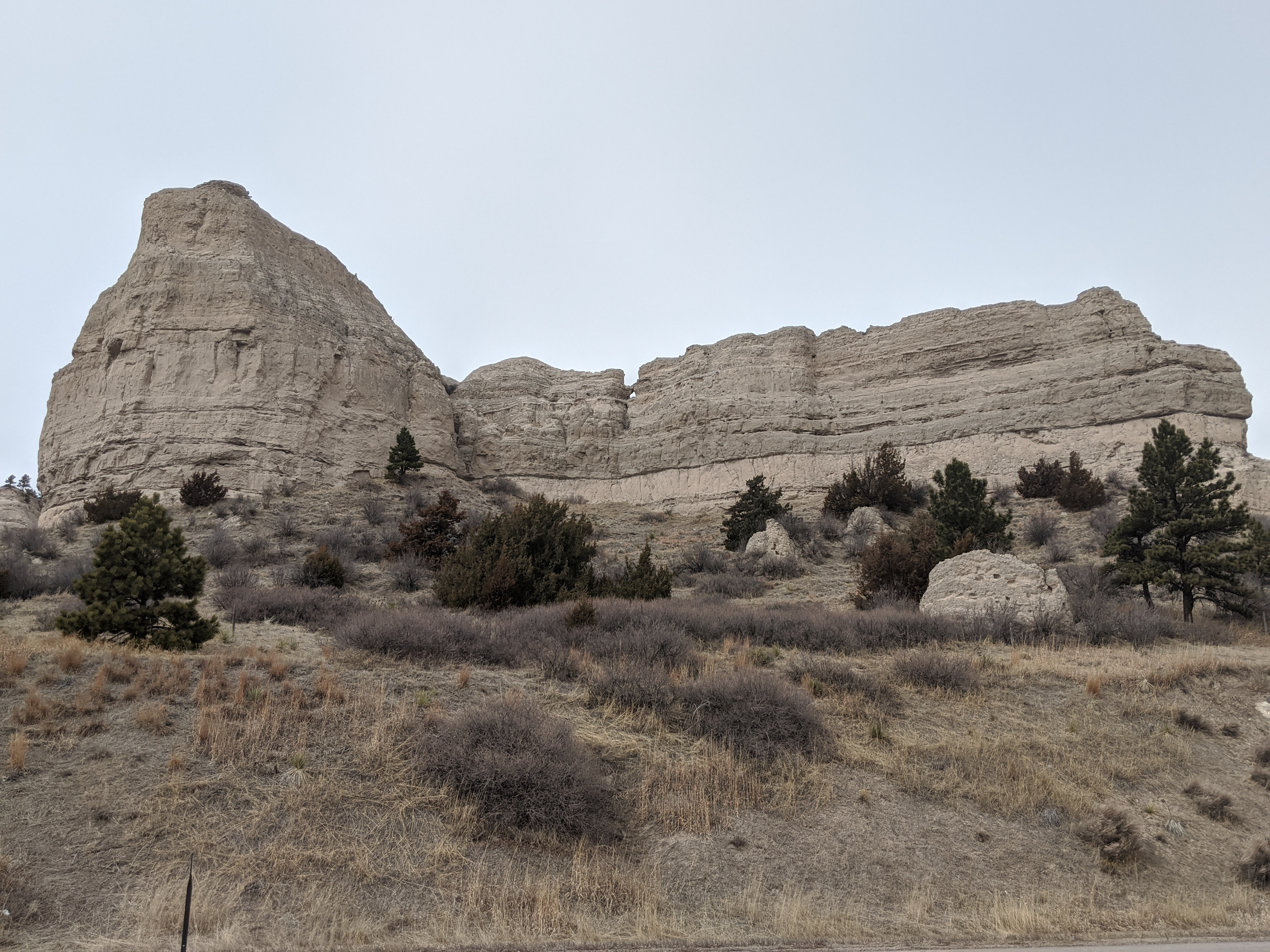
A butte in Wildcat Hills

The plant and animal life in the Wildcat Hills is atypical for Nebraska; the ecology more resembles that of the Laramie Mountains, 60 miles to the west. The dominant tree in the region is the ponderosa pine. Bighorn sheep, pronghorn, elk, mule deer, and wild turkeys live in and around the hills.

Cougars (mountain lions), which had been extirpated from the region around 1900, returned to the area in the early 1990s. The Wildcat Hills (along with the Pine Ridge), are the only areas in Nebraska with a permanent breeding cougar population.

== History ==
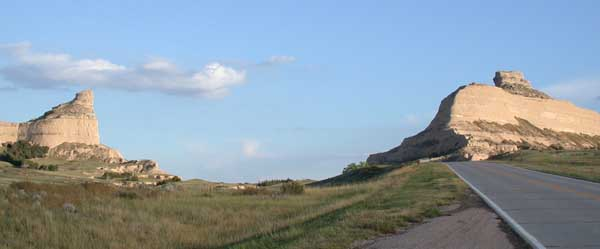
Mitchell Pass looking east

The Emigrant Trail passed through the northern Wildcat Hills at Robidoux Pass and after 1851, at Mitchell Pass; the rock formations were frequently mentioned in emigrant journals and letters. The Nebraska Game and Parks Commission acquired land for the Wildcat Hills State Recreation Area 41°42′08″N 103°40′02″W in stages between 1929 and 1980; the Wildcat Hills Nature Center, featuring a half-mile boardwalk trail, opened in 1995. Today, the Wildcat Hills are a popular hiking and wildlife viewing destination.
