= Mitchell Pass =

Landform in Nebraska, U.S.

Coordinates: 41°49′47.17″N 103°42′43.17″W

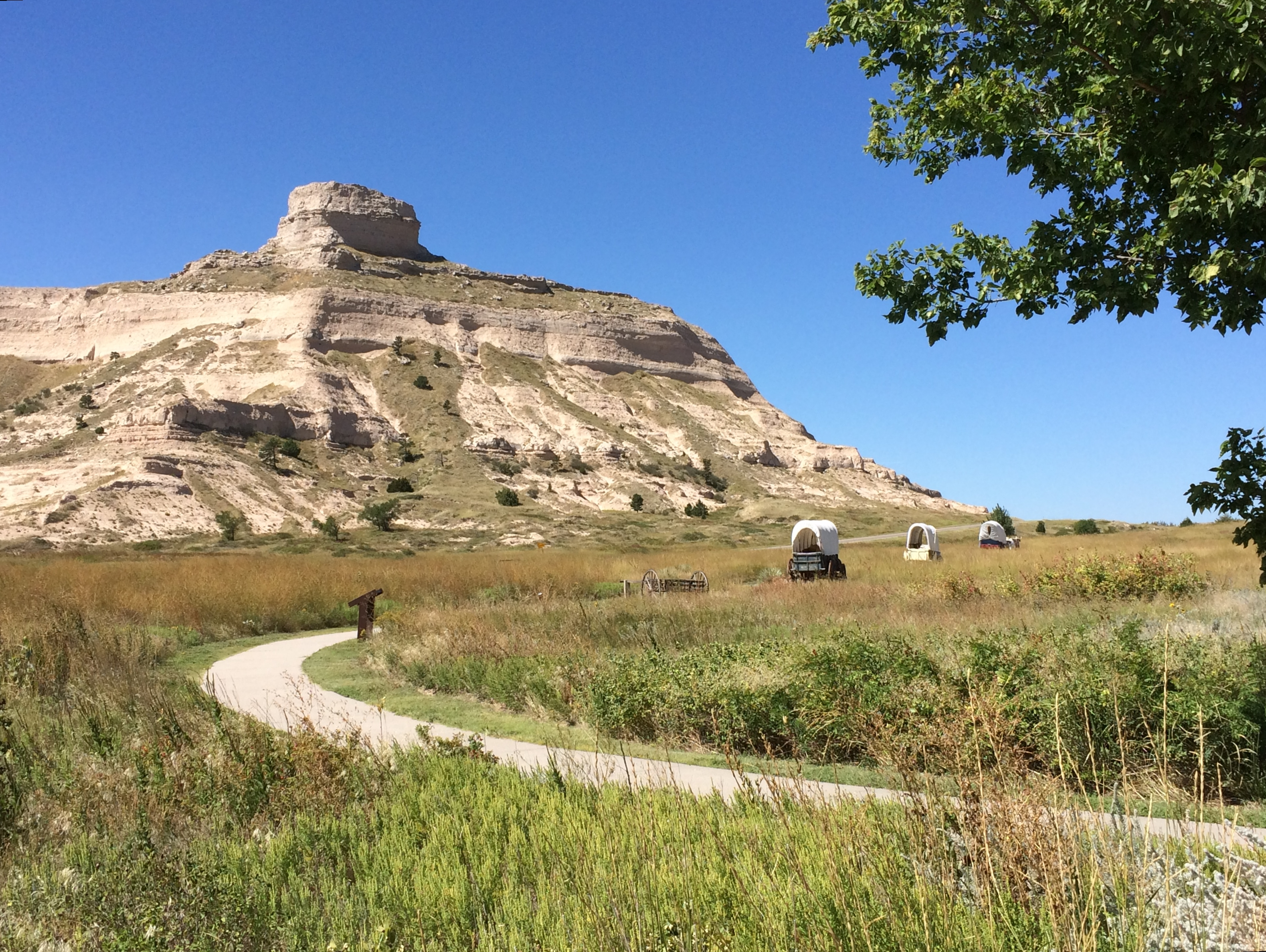
A picture of Mitchell Pass in 2016

Mitchell Pass is a gap through the bluffs near Scottsbluff and Gering, Nebraska. Beginning in 1851, two of the Westward Expansion Trails passed through the gap, as did the Pony Express in the early 1860s. Today the area is protected as part of Scotts Bluff National Monument.

== History ==
Although the gap between South Bluff and Scotts Bluff is a natural landform in the northern Wildcat Hills, the area was not easily traversed. Originally, the main branch of the Great Platte River Road (customarily referred to as the Oregon Trail and also later the California Trail) passed to the south of the bluffs at Robidoux Pass. Beginning in 1851, after the construction of a road between the bluffs, Mitchell Pass became the preferred route of the Great Platte River Road. It was favored over Robidoux Pass because it was both shorter and emigrants remained closer to the North Platte River, an important water source. Who built the road through the pass about 1850 is unknown, although one possibility includes soldiers from Fort Laramie. The northern branch of the Great Platte River Road, commonly called the Mormon Trail, did not use Mitchell Pass, but rather passed the bluffs at a further distance on the north side of the North Platte River.

The Pony Express went through Mitchell Pass, as did the wires for the first transcontinental telegraph.

The term Mitchell Pass was not used during most of the emigrant period, rather it was called "Devil's Gap" (because of the howling winds), "The Gap" or "Second Scott's Bluffs Pass." It only became known as Mitchell Pass following the establishment of nearby Fort Mitchell in 1864.

== Modern highway through the pass ==
A branch of Nebraska Highway 92 now passes through the gap.

- N-92 Nebraska Route 92 - route going west from Scottsbluff, Nebraska, to the Wyoming border.

== See also ==
- General Robert B. Mitchell
- Fort Mitchell, Nebraska
- Mitchell, Nebraska
