= Robidoux Pass =

Landform in Nebraska, U.S.

- U.S. National Register of Historic Places
- U.S. National Historic Landmark
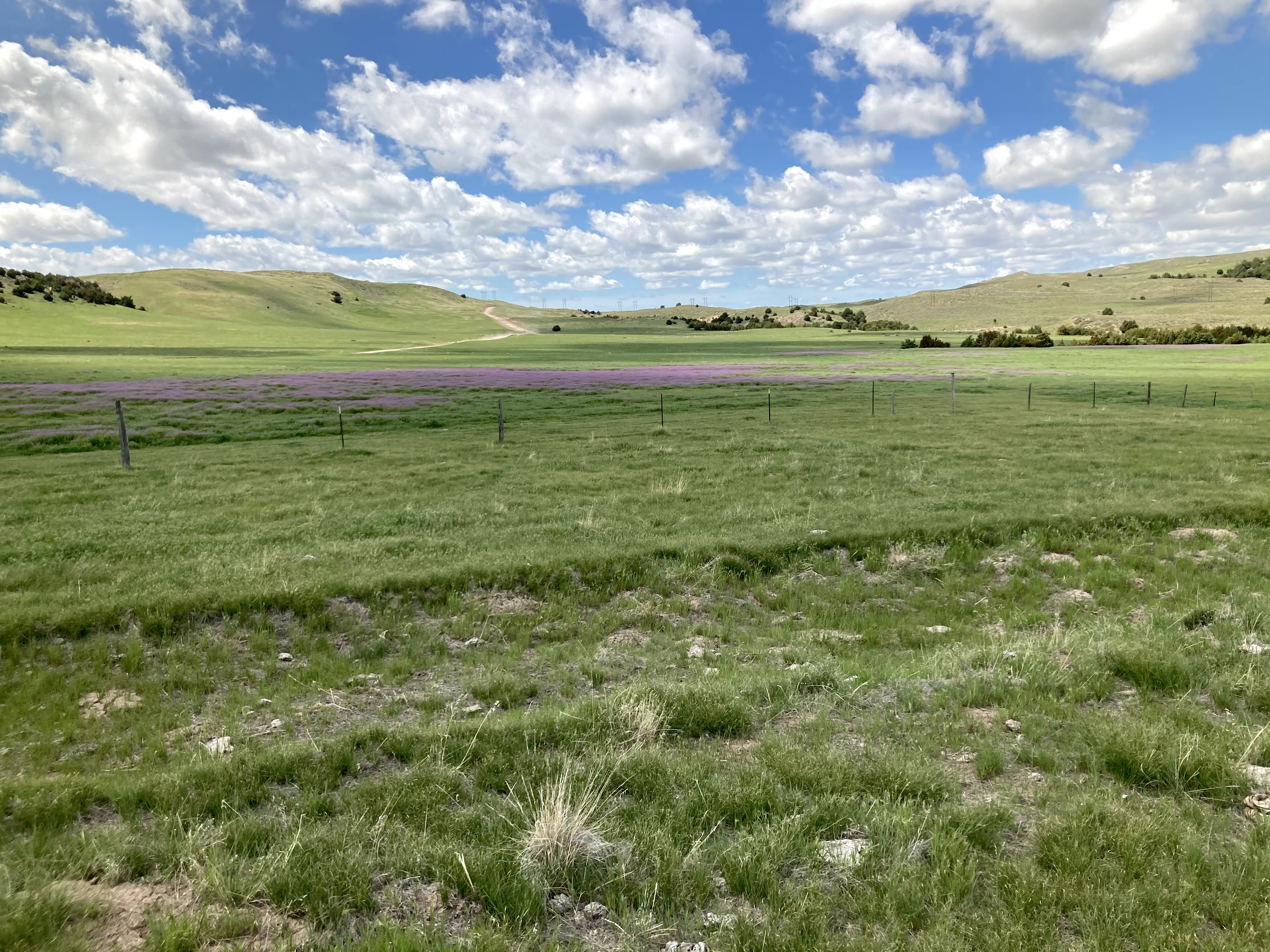
- Robidoux Pass from the east in Spring 2021

- Location within Nebraska Location within the United States
- Nearest city: Gering, Nebraska
- Coordinates: 41°48′54″N 103°51′14″W
- Built: 1848
- NRHP reference No.: 66000450

Significant dates
- Added to NRHP: October 15, 1966
- Designated NHL: January 20, 1961

Robidoux Pass, also known as Roubadeau Pass, Roubedeau Pass, Roubideau Pass, Roubidoux Pass and Roubadeau Pass Gap, is a gap passing through the Wildcat Hills near Scottsbluff, Nebraska about 9 miles (14 km) west of Gering, Nebraska. The gap was on the Great Platte River Road section of the historic Oregon or Emigrant Trail. It is at an elevation of 4,554 feet (1,388 m). Used by thousands of immigrants to the west from 1843-1851, the pass is a National Historic Landmark.

The area was named for members of the Robideau family, either Antoine or Joseph E. Robideau (also spelled Robidoux), who in the 1840s maintained a trading post east of the gap and later one at Scottsbluff. It contained blacksmith and grog shops, as well as other goods. The pass lies a few miles west southwest of Scottsbluff, Nebraska in broken country south of the North Platte River and the Wildcat Hills.

Scotts Bluff blocked wagon travel along the south bank of the North Platte River, forcing early travelers to swing south and go through Robidoux Pass, a natural gateway in the great bluffs. In 1850, a shorter route was opened through Mitchell Pass, just south of the monument itself and much closer to the Platte River and eliminated the eight-mile swing south.

A local road, Robidoux Road, now passes through the gap. Robidoux Pass is located south of Scotts Bluff National Monument, 4.5 miles (7.2 km) south and 8 miles (13 km) west of Gering, Nebraska off Nebraska Highway 71 on Robidoux Road.

The site was declared a National Historic Landmark in 1961.

== See also ==
- List of National Historic Landmarks in Nebraska
