= Mitchell High School (Nebraska) =

Mitchell Junior/Senior High School

Location
- 1819 9th Ave. Mitchell, Nebraska 69357; United States; 41°56′46″N 103°48′46″W

Information
- School district: Mitchell City Schools
- Superintendent: Kathy Urbanek
- Principal: Heath Peters
- Teaching staff: 23.69 (FTE)
- Grades: 7–12
- Enrollment: 268 (2022-2023)
- Student to teacher ratio: 11.31
- Colors: Orange and black
- Mascot: Tiger
- Website: www.mpstigers.com/jrsrhigh.html

Mitchell High School is located in Mitchell, Nebraska, United States. In the 2005–06 school year, the school had a population of about 305 students in grades 7–12. Mitchell High School is a member of the Nebraska School Activities Association. The socioeconomic status of the students is low-middle to middle income. The principal is Heath Peters.

The school mascot is the Tiger.

School activities include football, volleyball, golf, cross-country, basketball, wrestling, one-acts, speech, marching band, jazz choir, FBLA, Quiz Bowl, National Honor Society, track and field, and cheer-leading.
