= Williams, Nebraska =

American ghost town

Coordinates: 40.05667°N 97.41504°W

Williams is a ghost town in Thayer County, Nebraska, United States.

== History ==
A post office was established at Williams in 1901, and remained in operation until it was discontinued in 1934. The original owners of the town site named the town for their son William.
