= Mitchell, Nebraska =

City in Scotts Bluff County, Nebraska, United States

- City
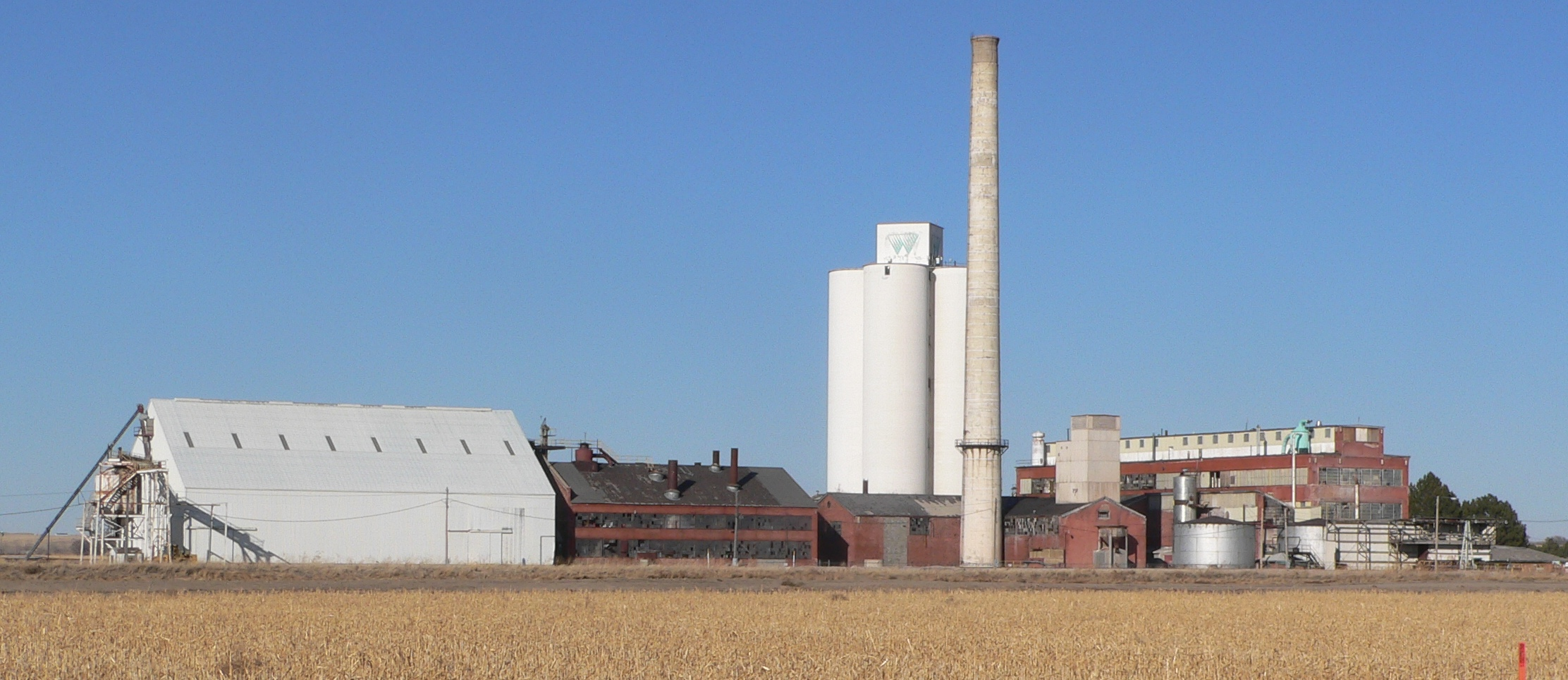
- Western Sugar storage facility and closed sugar factory in Mitchell, February 2012

- Location of Mitchell, Nebraska
- Coordinates: 41°56′34″N 103°48′35″W
- Country: United States
- State: Nebraska
- County: Scotts Bluff
- Incorporated: 1902

Government
  - Mayor: Brian Taylor
  - City Administrator: Ty J. Abernathy

Area
  - Total: 0.67 sq mi (1.74 km^{2})
  - Land: 0.67 sq mi (1.74 km^{2})
  - Water: 0 sq mi (0.00 km^{2})
- Elevation: 3,954 ft (1,205 m)

Population (2020)
  - Total: 1,548
  - Density: 2,305.5/sq mi (890.17/km^{2})
- Time zone: UTC−7 (Mountain (MST))
  - Summer (DST): UTC−6 (MDT)
- ZIP code: 69357
- Area code: 308
- FIPS code: 31-32410
- GNIS feature ID: 2395359
- Website: www.mitchellcity.net

Mitchell is a city in Scotts Bluff County, Nebraska, United States. It is part of the Scottsbluff, Nebraska Micropolitan Statistical Area. The population was 1,548 at the 2020 census.

== History ==
Mitchell was established in 1900, when the Chicago, Burlington and Quincy Railroad was extended westward to that point. It was named after the historic Fort Mitchell nearby, which had been named after General Robert B. Mitchell, a brigadier general in the Union Army during the American Civil War. Mitchell was incorporated as a city in 1902.

== Geography ==
According to the United States Census Bureau, the city has a total area of 0.67 square miles (1.74 km^{2}), all land. Mitchell is northwest of Scottsbluff.

== Demographics ==
Historical population
Census	Pop.	Note	%±
1910	640		—
1920	1,298		102.8%
1930	2,058		58.6%
1940	2,181		6.0%
1950	2,101		−3.7%
1960	1,920		−8.6%
1970	1,842		−4.1%
1980	1,956		6.2%
1990	1,743		−10.9%
2000	1,831		5.0%
2010	1,702		−7.0%
2020	1,548		−9.0%
U.S. Decennial Census; 2012 Estimate

=== 2010 census ===
As of the census of 2010, there were 1,702 people, 696 households, and 441 families residing in the city. The population density was 2,540.3 inhabitants per square mile (980.8/km^{2}). There were 790 housing units at an average density of 1,179.1 per square mile (455.3/km^{2}). The racial makeup of the city was 90.8% White, 0.2% African American, 0.6% Native American, 0.4% Asian, 6.6% from other races, and 1.4% from two or more races. Hispanic or Latino of any race were 23.1% of the population.

There were 696 households, of which 32.3% had children under the age of 18 living with them, 45.3% were married couples living together, 13.2% had a female householder with no husband present, 4.9% had a male householder with no wife present, and 36.6% were non-families. 32.6% of all households were made up of individuals, and 15.3% had someone living alone who was 65 years of age or older. The average household size was 2.38 and the average family size was 2.99.

The median age in the city was 40.2 years. 24.4% of residents were under the age of 18; 7.7% were between the ages of 18 and 24; 23.2% were from 25 to 44; 24.5% were from 45 to 64; and 20.2% were 65 years of age or older. The gender makeup of the city was 46.4% male and 53.6% female.

=== 2000 census ===
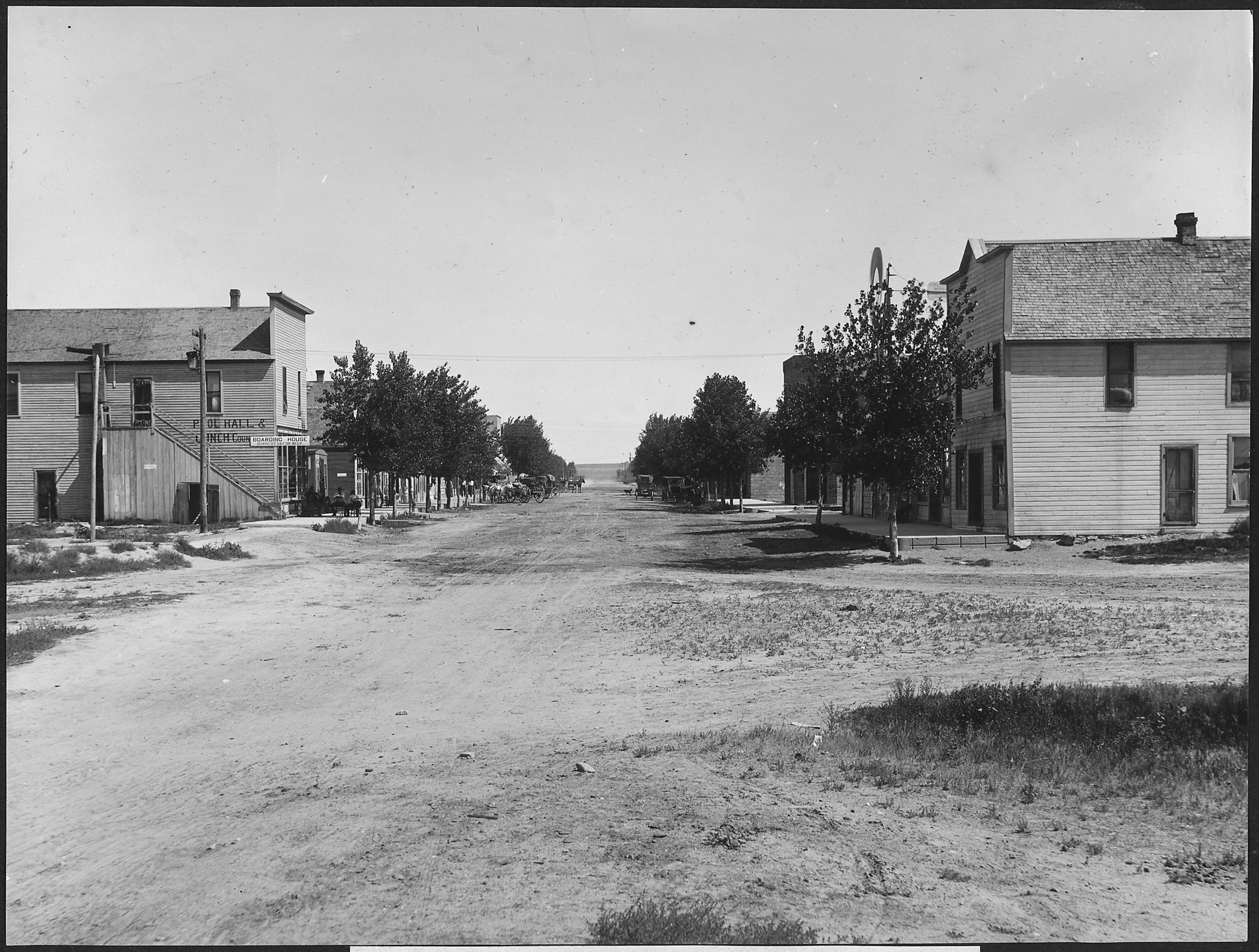
Mitchell, 1910

As of the census of 2000, there were 1,831 people, 714 households, and 474 families residing in the city. The population density was 2,725.2 inhabitants per square mile (1,052.2/km^{2}). There were 793 housing units at an average density of 1,180.3 per square mile (455.7/km^{2}). The racial makeup of the city was 86.24% White, 0.11% African American, 0.38% Native American, 0.66% Asian, 0.11% Pacific Islander, 11.41% from other races, and 1.09% from two or more races. Hispanic or Latino of any race were 22.06% of the population.

There were 714 households, out of which 33.1% had children under the age of 18 living with them, 52.5% were married couples living together, 10.1% had a female householder with no husband present, and 33.6% were non-families. 30.0% of all households were made up of individuals, and 15.3% had someone living alone who was 65 years of age or older. The average household size was 2.48 and the average family size was 3.06.

In the city, the population was spread out, with 27.5% under the age of 18, 8.5% from 18 to 24, 24.6% from 25 to 44, 20.0% from 45 to 64, and 19.4% who were 65 years of age or older. The median age was 36 years. For every 100 females, there were 84.9 males. For every 100 females age 18 and over, there were 82.9 males.

As of 2000 the median income for a household in the city was $28,710, and the median income for a family was $34,900. Males had a median income of $26,534 versus $18,672 for females. The per capita income for the city was $14,286. About 15.0% of families and 19.8% of the population were below the poverty line, including 26.7% of those under age 18 and 11.3% of those age 65 or over.

== Education ==
Mitchell is part of the Mitchell Public Schools School District. The district has two schools, Mitchell Elementary School and Mitchell High School.

== Culture and recreation ==
=== Annual cultural event ===
The Scotts Bluff County Fair, first organized in 1887, is held in Mitchell each year. The fair includes a pageant, musical entertainment, livestock show and circus.

=== Recreation ===
- The Scenic Knolls Golf Course is a 9-hole course that opened in 1993. The course includes 3,476 yards of golf.
- Public Swimming Pool at 2012 17th Street.

== Highways ==
- U.S. Highway 26 - east-west route through Mitchell (Broadway St.)
- N-29 - Nebraska Route 29 - north-south route in Mitchell (19th Avenue)

== See also ==
- List of municipalities in Nebraska
- Fort Mitchell, Nebraska
- Mitchell Pass
- General Robert B. Mitchell
