= Chimney Rock National Historic Site =

Historic site in Nebraska, United States

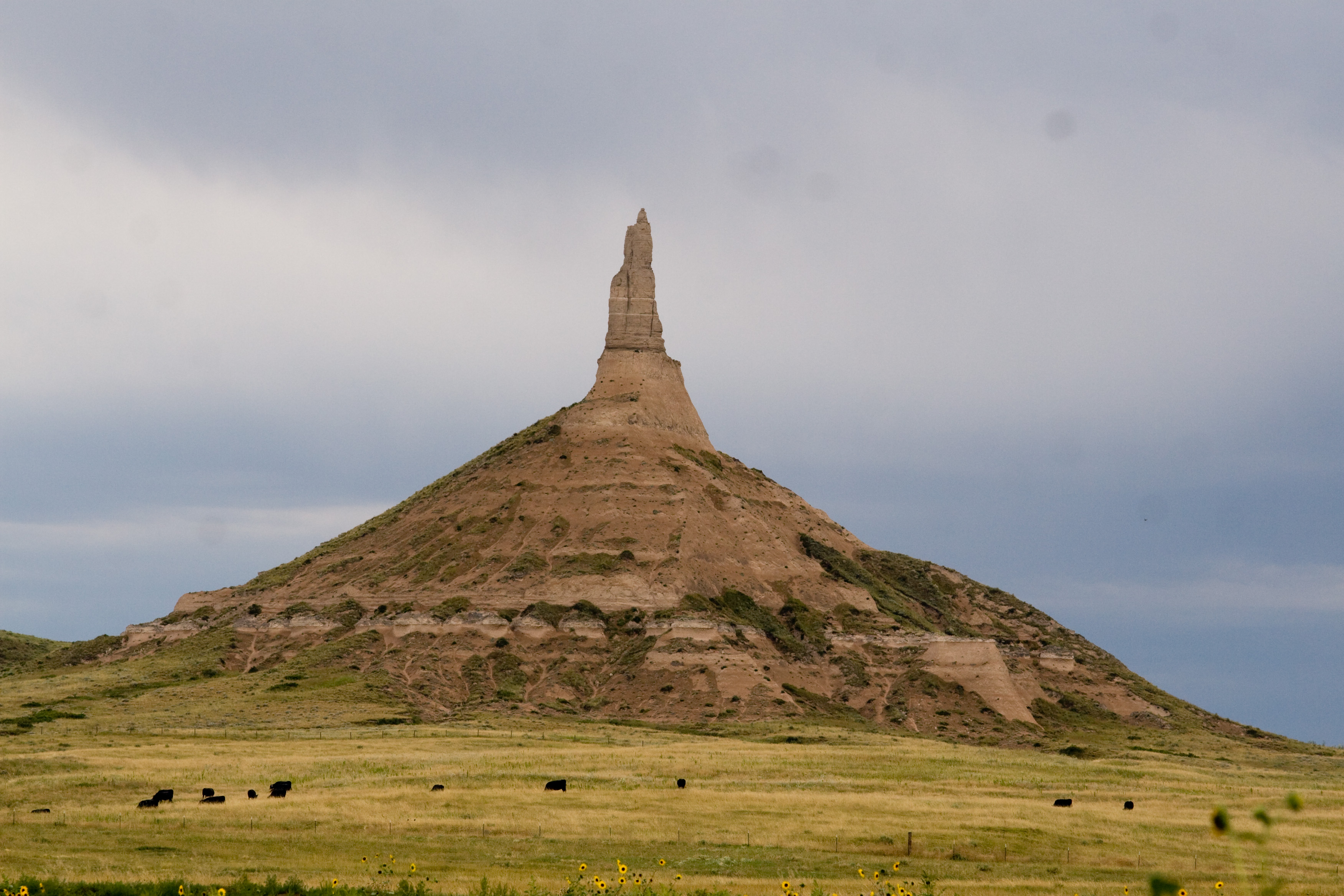
- Chimney Rock (2009)

- Location within the United States Location within Nebraska
- Location: Morrill County, Nebraska, U.S.
- Nearest city: Bayard, Nebraska
- Coordinates: 41°42′13″N 103°20′54″W
- Area: 83 acres (34 ha)
- Established: October 15, 1966; 60 years ago
- Designated: August 9, 1956; 70 years ago
- Operator: History Nebraska

Chimney Rock is a prominent geological rock formation in the United States, located in Morrill County in western Nebraska. Rising over 300 feet (90 m) above the surrounding North Platte River valley, the peak of Chimney Rock is 4,228 feet (1,289 m) above sea level. The formation served as a landmark along the Oregon, California, and Mormon Trails during the mid-19th century. The trails ran along the north side of the rock, which remains a visible landmark for modern travelers along U.S. Route 26 and Nebraska Highway 92. Chimney Rock National Historic Site was designated in 1956 and is an affiliated area of the National Park Service, operated by History Nebraska. A decade later, Chimney Rock was added to the National Register of Historic Places on October 15, 1966.

== History ==
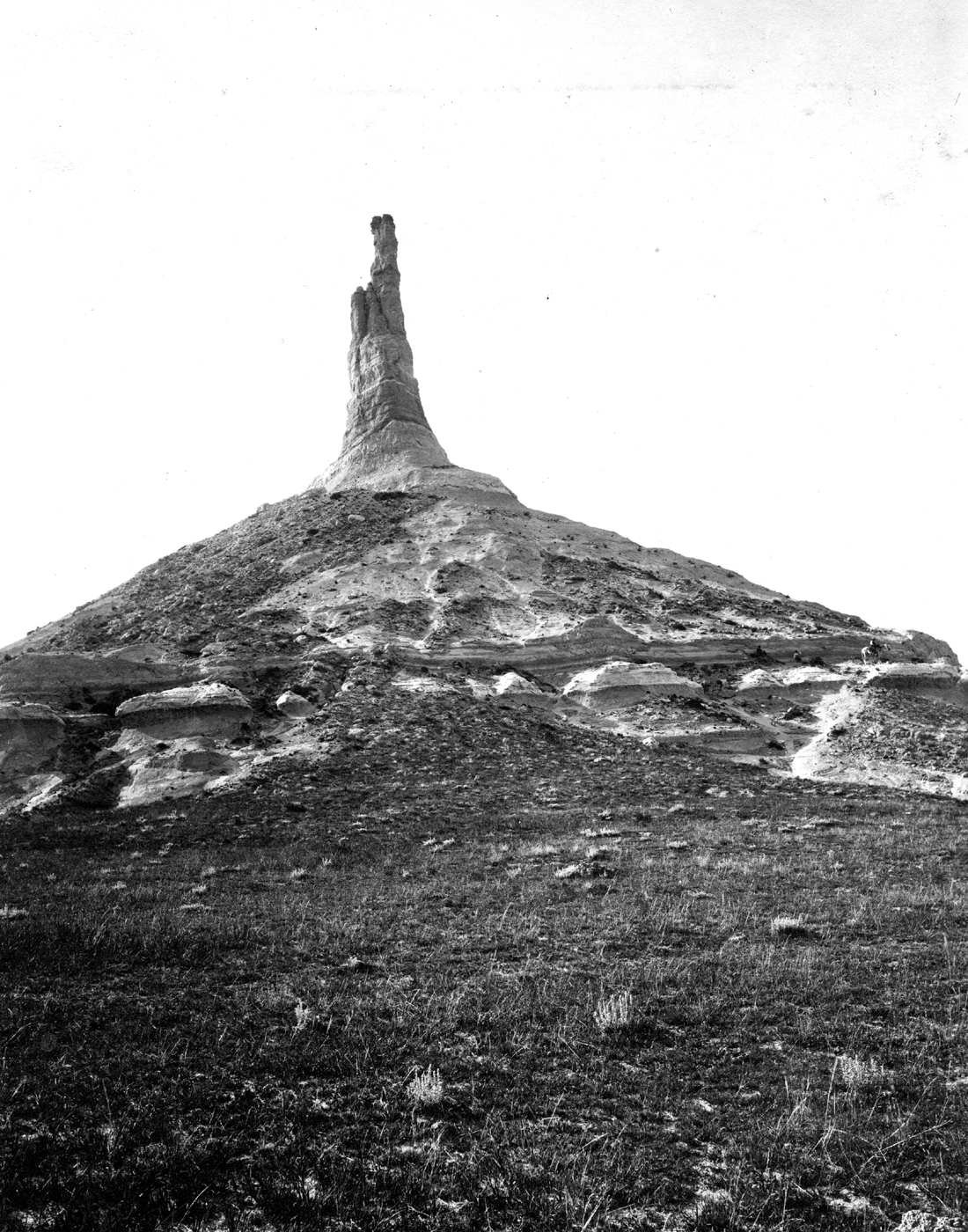
Chimney Rock; pictured c. 1897

Prior to exploration and settlement by European immigrants, the Native Americans of the area—mainly the Lakota Sioux—would refer to this formation by a term which meant "elk penis". The first non-natives to see the pillar were probably the Astorians of Robert Stuart in their eastward journey from the Pacific Ocean in 1813. Chimney Rock was recorded in many journals after the Stuart expedition.

The name "Chimney Rock" probably originated from early fur traders. The first recorded mention of "Chimney Rock" was in 1827 by Joshua Pilcher. Pilcher had journeyed up the Platte River valley to the Salt Lake rendezvous of the Rocky Mountain fur trappers. The formation went through a variety of names before becoming Chimney Rock such as Chimley Rock and Chimney Tower, as well as euphemisms based on the original Native American name, such as Elk's Peak and Elk Brick.

A small town named Chimney Rock once stood near the base of the formation. A post office was established at the town of Chimney Rock in 1913, and remained in operation until 1922.

Based on sketches, paintings, written accounts, and the 1897 photograph by Darton, Chimney Rock was taller when it was first seen by settlers, but has since been reduced in height by erosion, lightning, and reportedly by cannon fire from the ground and from aircraft.

== Geology ==
Chimney Rock consists primarily of Brule clay interlayered with volcanic ash and Arikaree sandstone. The harder sandstone layers near the top have protected the pillar since it broke away from the retreating cliff line to the south. Chimney Rock rises approximately 286 feet (87 m) above its surroundings.

== Today ==
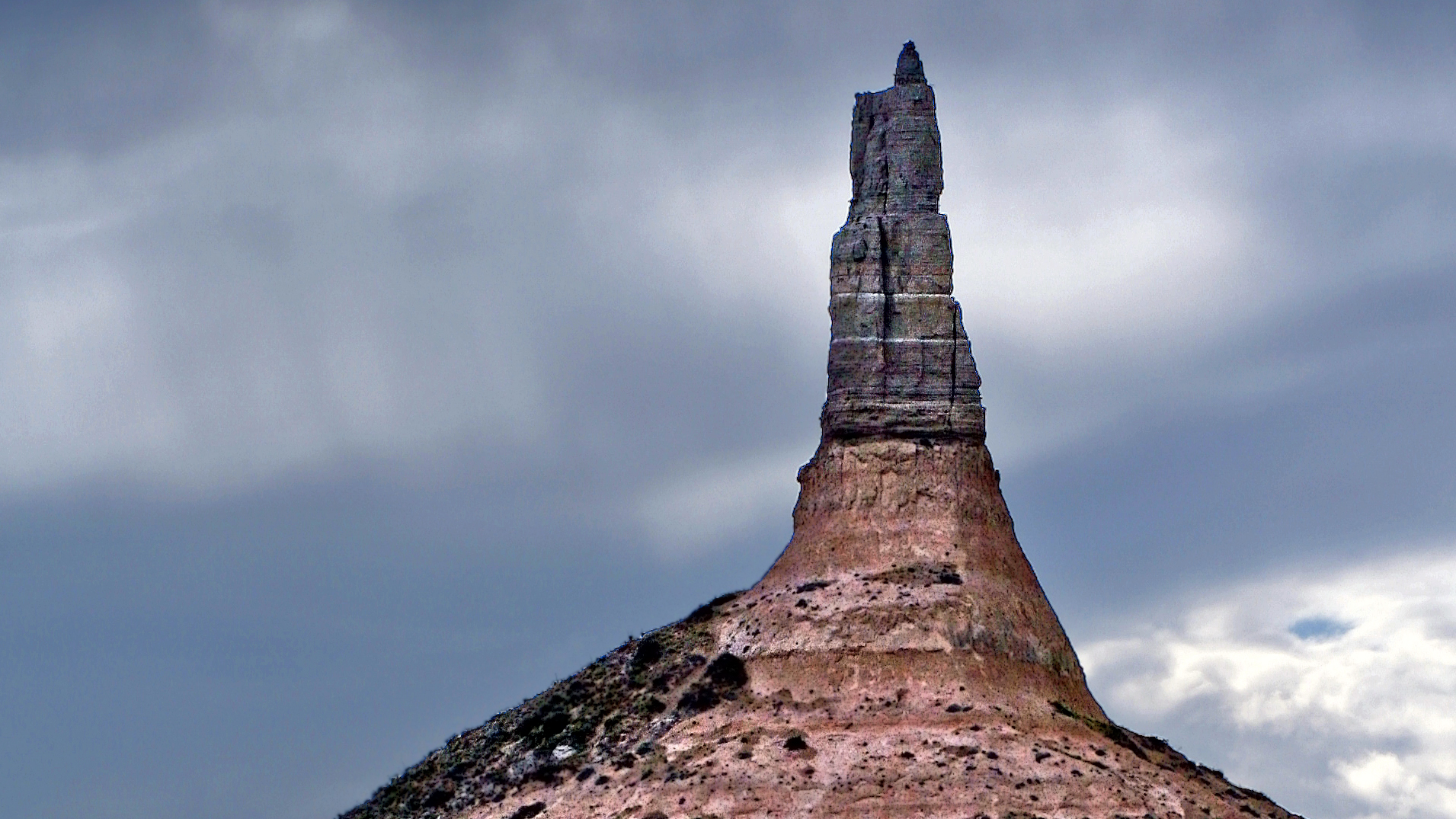
A close-up of Chimney Rock

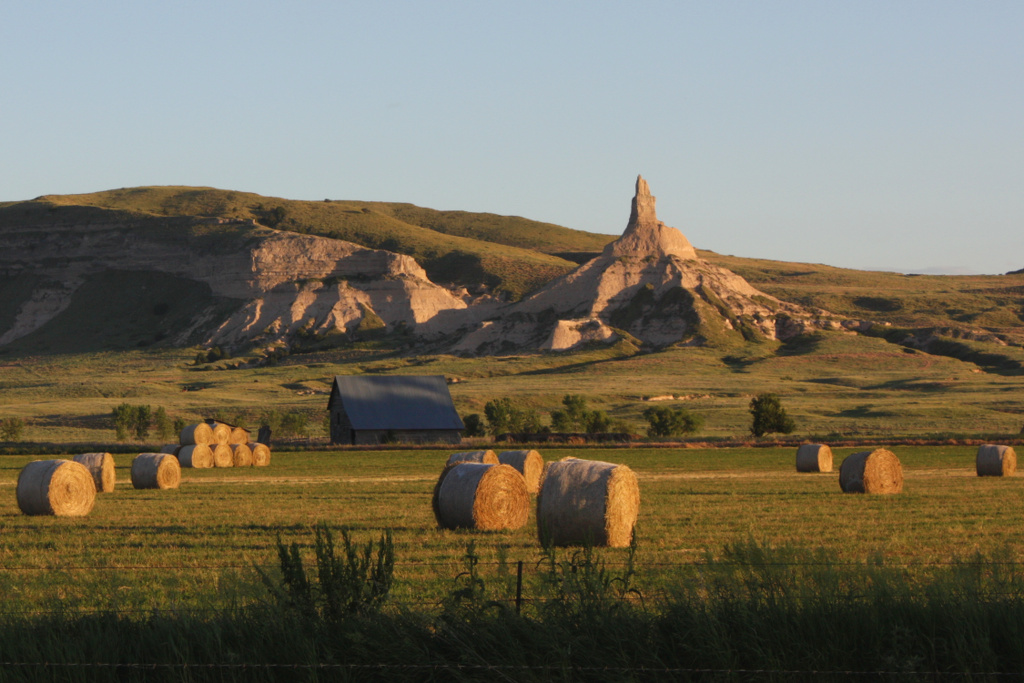
Chimney Rock from the north (2016)

Chimney Rock was designated a National Historic Site on August 9, 1956, and is a National Park Service (NPS) affiliated area, maintained and administered by History Nebraska with NPS technical support. Chimney Rock and Independence Rock further west in Wyoming are two of the prominent features along the Oregon Trail. Chimney Rock is located twenty miles (32 km) southeast of Scotts Bluff National Monument, on Nebraska Highway 92.

The Ethel and Christopher J. Abbot Visitor Center features museum exhibits and a video about pioneers and the migrations in the West, as well as a gift shop.

On March 1, 2006, the Nebraska State Quarter was released. The quarter features a covered wagon headed west past Chimney Rock, commemorating Nebraska's role in westward migration.

== See also ==
- Landmarks of the Nebraska Territory
- Butte
- Hoodoo
- Courthouse and Jail Rocks
- Nebraska Sandhills
- Chimney Rock State Park, North Carolina
