= Scotts Bluff National Monument =

National Park Service site in Nebraska, US

- IUCN category III (natural monument or feature)
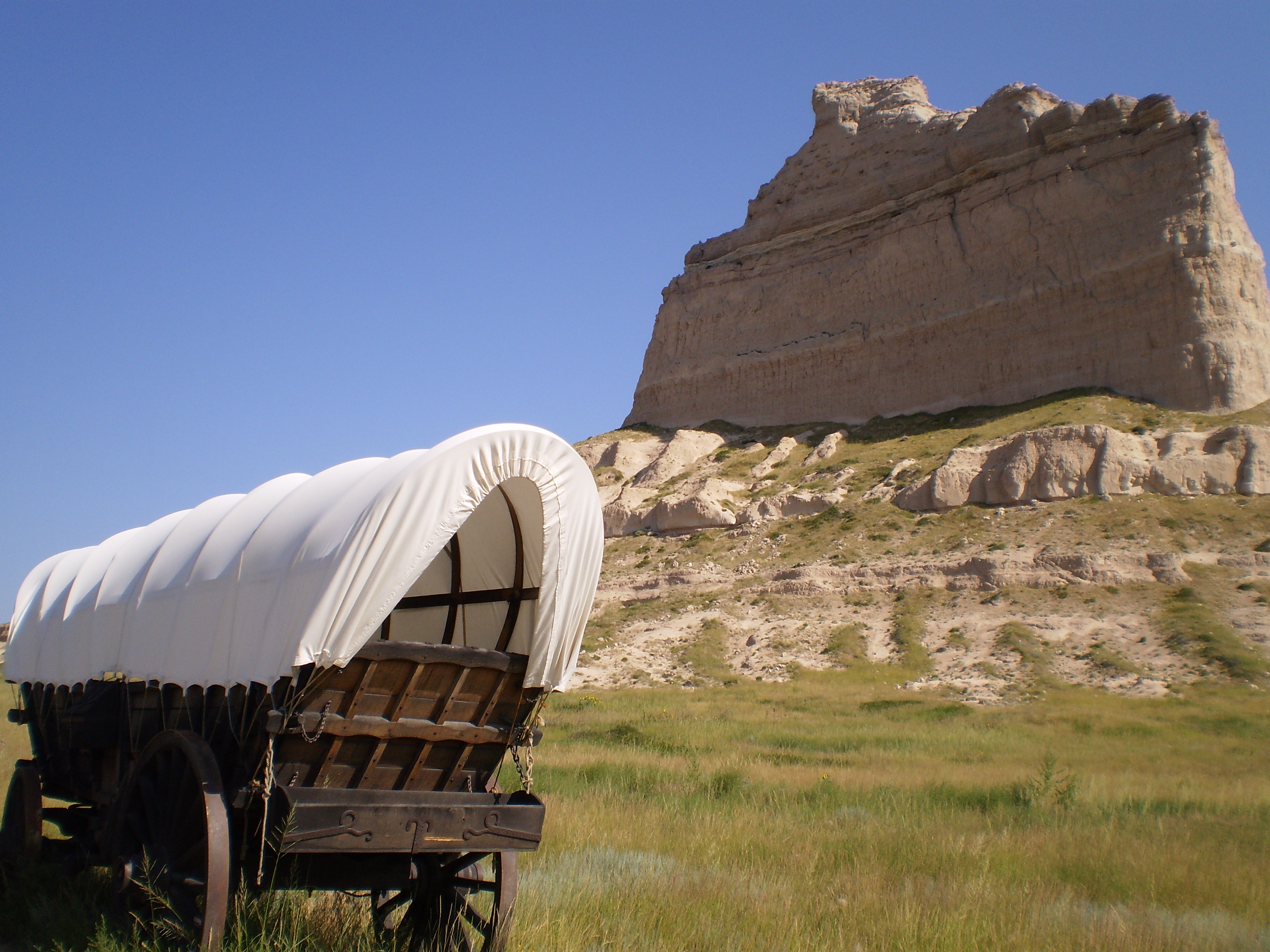
- Covered Wagon on the Oregon Trail at Scotts Bluff

- Location within Nebraska Location within the United States
- Interactive map of Scotts Bluff National Monument
- Location: Scotts Bluff County, Nebraska, U.S.
- Nearest city: Gering, Nebraska
- Coordinates: 41°50′05″N 103°42′26″W
- Area: 3,005 acres (12.16 km^{2})
- Created: December 12, 1919
- Visitors: 182,392 (in 2025)
- Governing body: National Park Service
- Website: Scotts Bluff National Monument

Scotts Bluff National Monument is located west of the city of Gering in western Nebraska, United States. This National Park Service site protects over 3,000 acres of historic overland trail remnants, mixed-grass prairie, rugged badlands, towering bluffs and riparian area along the North Platte River. The park boasts over 100,000 annual visitors.

The monument's north bluff is named after Hiram Scott, who was a clerk for the Rocky Mountain Fur Company and died near the bluff in 1828. The bluff served as an important landmark on the Oregon Trail, California Trail and Pony Express Trail, and was visible at a distance from the Mormon Trail. Over 250,000 westward emigrants passed by Scotts Bluff between 1843 and 1869. It was the second-most referred to landmark on the Emigrant Trails in pioneer journals and diaries.

Scotts Bluff County and the city of Scottsbluff, Nebraska, were named after the landmark.

== Geography ==
Although called "Scotts Bluff National Monument", the site includes two separate bluffs, "South Bluff" and the northern bluff called "Scotts Bluff". There are five major outcroppings on the bluffs, known as Dome Rock, Crown Rock, Sentinel Rock, Eagle Rock and Saddle Rock. The area between Scotts Bluff and the North Platte River is known as the "Badlands".

== History ==
=== Charting the landmark ===
The collection of bluffs was first charted in 1812 by the Astorian Expedition of fur traders traveling along the river. The expedition party noted the bluffs as the first large rock formations along the North Platte River where the Great Plains started giving way to the foothills of the Rocky Mountains. Their findings were not widely communicated because of the War of 1812. Explorers rediscovered the route to the Rocky Mountains in 1823, and fur traders in the region relied on the bluffs as a landmark. European Americans named the north, and most prominent bluff, after Hiram Scott, a fur trader who died in 1828 near the bluffs. The local Native Americans had called it Me-a-pa-te, "the hill that is hard to go around".

=== Emigrant trail landmark ===
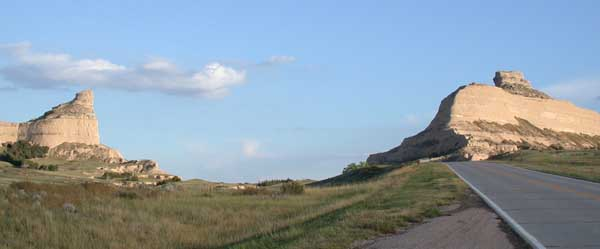
Mitchell Pass looking east. South Bluff's Sentinel Rock is to the right and Scotts Bluff's Eagle Rock is to the left.

Fur traders, missionaries, and military expeditions began regular trips past Scotts Bluff during the 1830s. Beginning in 1841, multitudes of settlers passed by Scotts Bluff on their way west along the Great Platte River Road to Oregon, and later California and Utah. All these groups used the bluff as a major landmark for navigation.

Although a natural gap existed between South Bluff and Scotts Bluff, the area was not easily traversed. So initially the Oregon Trail passed to the south of the Scotts Bluff area at Robidoux Pass and the Mormon Trail passed to the north of the bluff, on the other side of the North Platte River. In the early 1850s a road was constructed in the gap, which later became known as Mitchell Pass. Beginning in 1851, this new passage became the preferred route of the Oregon and California Trails; although the Mormon Trail continued to pass the bluff only at a distance. Who built the road through Mitchell Pass about 1850 is unknown, although one possibility includes soldiers from Fort Laramie. Many emigrants preferred this route rather than trying to traverse the badlands on the north side of the bluffs or detouring south to the older trail at Robidoux Pass. Use of the Emigrant Trail tapered off in 1869 after the trail was superseded by the completion of the transcontinental railroad.

=== Settlement in the Scotts Bluff area ===
The town of Gering, Nebraska, was founded near the base of the bluff in 1887, and the city of Scottsbluff was founded across the North Platte River from the bluff in 1900. Separated (or joined) by the river, the two cities have since grown together and now form the 6th-largest urban area in Nebraska.

Once permanent settlements had been established nearby, residents and travelers went to the bluff as a destination because of its extensive views of the flat land stretching to the east, the hills and mountains to the west, and the river valley in between. Developers built various trails up the bluff over the years, but most were precarious and dangerous. In the early 20th century, the National Park Service constructed a safer, more modern trail for improved access.

=== National Monument ===
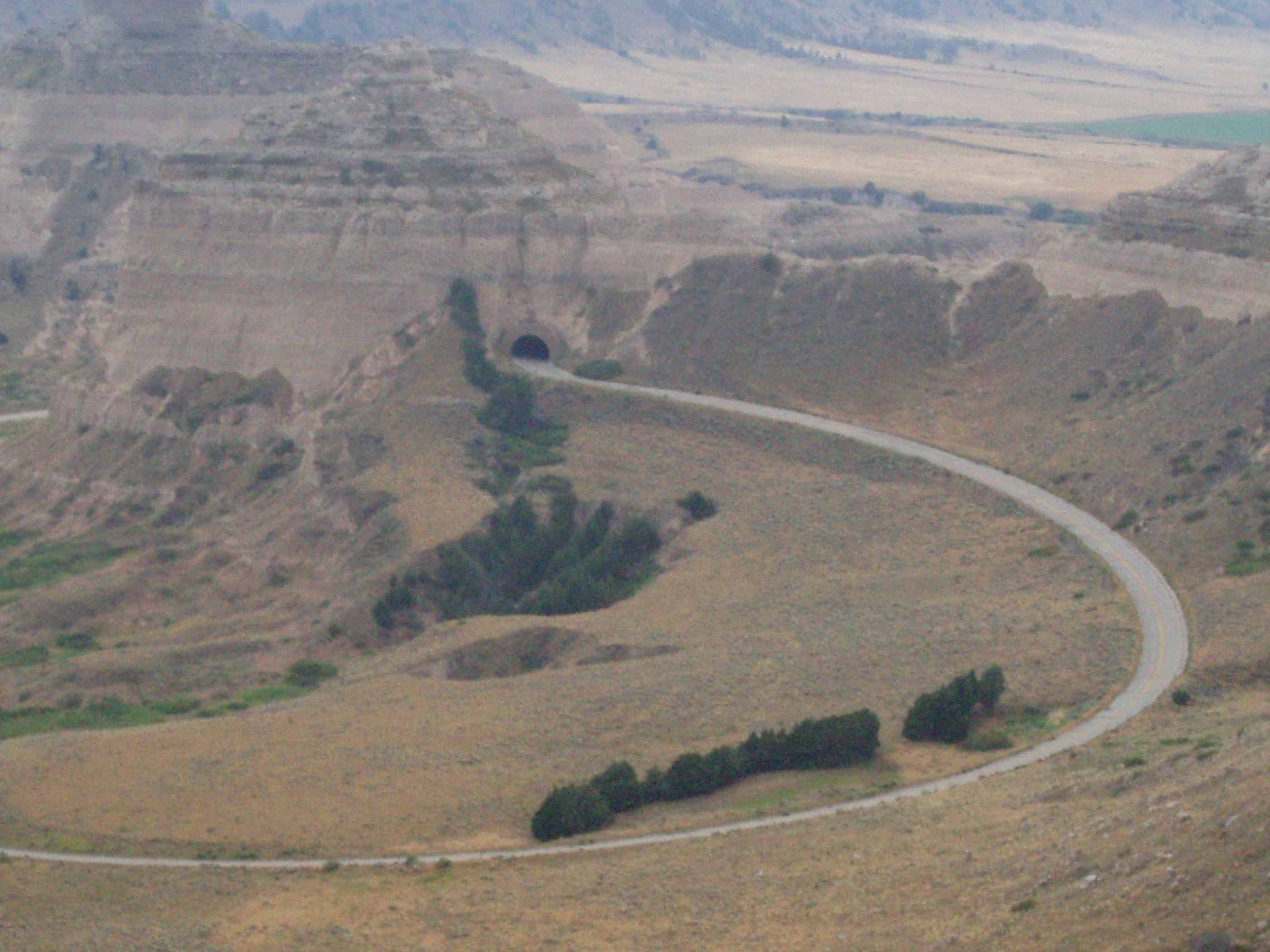
Tunnel through Scotts Bluff

The Department of Interior designated Scotts Bluff and several nearby bluffs as a National Monument on December 12, 1919; they were placed for management under the National Park Service, created just three years prior.

The Oregon Trail Museum and Visitor Center was built at the base of the bluff which serves as a start for hiking tours of the bluffs. Exhibits focus on the westward expansion and pioneers, the drawings and paintings of William Henry Jackson, and the geology and paleontology of the region.

In the 1930s, a roadway leading to the top of Scotts Bluff was constructed by the Civilian Conservation Corps, organized by President Franklin D. Roosevelt's administration. The road goes through three tunnels on its way to the top and provides easy access to the summit.

All historic sites administered by the National Park Service were listed on the National Register of Historic Places on October 15, 1966, when it was established.

== Name ==
=== The naming of Scotts Bluff ===
According to Washington Irving, around 1825 a fur trapping party was

descending the upper part of the (Nebraska) River in canoes when their frail barks were overturned and all their powder spoiled. Their rifles being thus rendered useless they were unable to procure food by hunting and had to depend upon roots and wild fruits for subsistence. After suffering extremely from hunger, they arrived at Laramie’s Fork, a small tributary of the north branch of the Nebraska, about sixty miles above the cliffs just mentioned. Here, one of their party by the name of Scott was taken ill; and his companions came to a halt, until he should recover health and strength sufficient to proceed. While they were searching round in quest of edible roots they discovered a fresh trail of white men, who had evidently but recently preceded them. What was to be done? By a forced march they might overtake this party, and thus be able to reach the settlements in safety. Should they linger they might all perish of famine and exhaustion. Scott, however, was incapable of moving; they were too feeble to aid him forward, and dreaded that such a clog would prevent them coming up with the advance party. They determined, therefore, to abandon him to his fate. Accordingly, under pretense of seeking food, and such simples as might be efficacious in his malady, they deserted him and hastened forward upon the trail. They succeeded in overtaking the party of which they were in quest, but concealed their faithless desertion of Scott; alleging that he had died of disease.

On the ensuing summer, these very individuals, visiting these parts in company with others, came suddenly upon the bleached bones and grinning skull of a human skeleton, which by certain signs, they recognized for the remains of Scott. This was sixty long miles from the place where they had abandoned him; and it appeared that the wretched man had crawled that immense distance before death put an end to his miseries. The wild and picturesque bluffs in the neighborhood of his lonely grave have ever since borne his name.

Another version of the legend portrays Scott's companions in more favorable terms:

A melancholy tradition accounts for the name of this spot. A party who had been trading with the Indians were returning to the States and encountering a band of hostile savages, were robbed of their peltries and food. As they struggled homeward, one of the number, named Scott, fell sick and could not travel. The others remained with him, until the sufferer, despairing of ever beholding his home, prevailed on his companions to abandon him. They left him alone in the wilderness, several miles from this spot. Here human bones were afterwards found; and, supposing he had crawled here and died, the subsequent travelers have given his name to the neighboring bluff.

=== Proper spelling ===
There has always been some disagreement as to the proper spelling of this geomorphic feature, specifically with regard to the apostrophe. For example, an 1843 map titled Map of an Exploratory Expedition to the Mountains in 1842 by John C. Frémont labeled the feature Scott's Bluff (with an apostrophe). Another early military map of Nebraska and the Dakotas published in 1875 by G.K. Warren dropped the apostrophe and labeled the feature simply as Scotts Bluff. There are numerous other examples in the late 19th and early 20th centuries in which the name has been spelled with or without an apostrophe. In a final decision by the United States Board on Geographical Names rendered on June 11, 1941, the name Scotts Bluff (without an apostrophe) was officially adopted. The nearby town of Scottsbluff is spelled as one word.

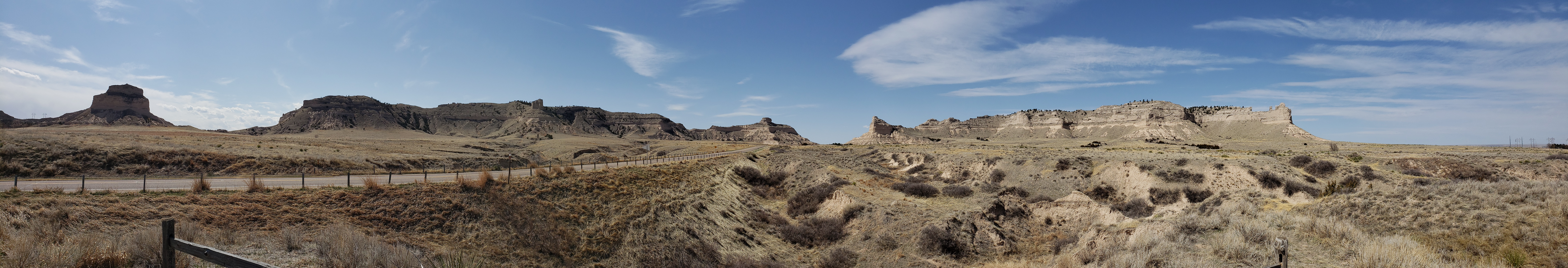
Panorama view of Mitchell Pass looking west, with South Bluff on the left and Scotts Bluff on the right

== Geology ==
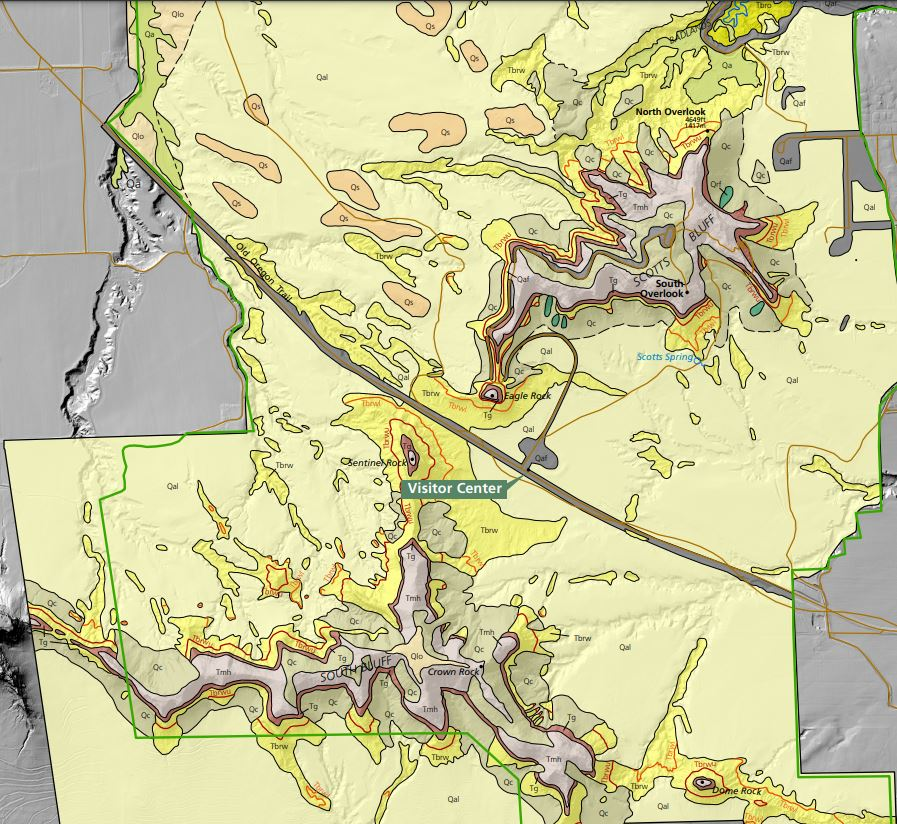
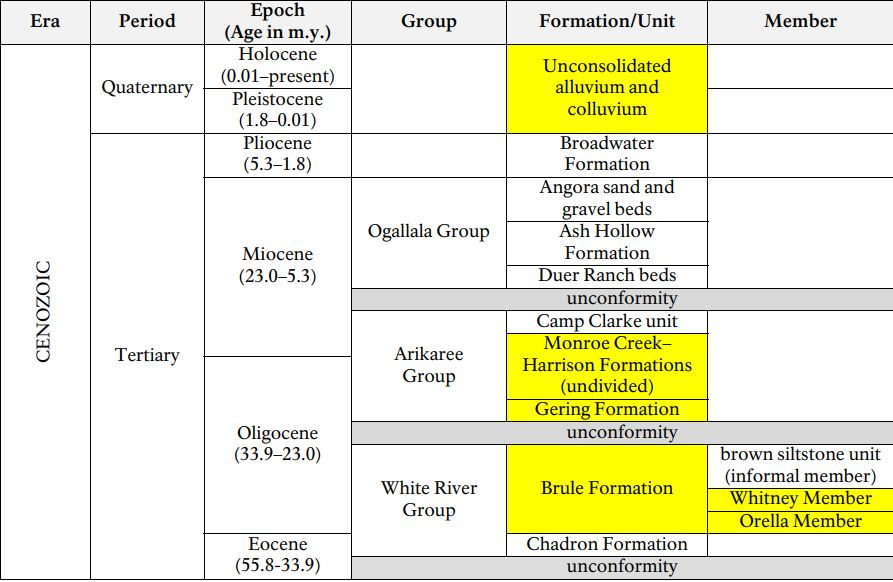
Scotts Bluff National Monument geological map (left) and stratigraphic column (right)

The oldest rocks visible within the monument are the Oligocene siltstones and mudstones of the Orella Member of the Brule Formation. The overlying Whitney Member in the same formation has volcaniclastic siltstones originating from volcanic centers to the west. An unconformity separates the Brule from the overlying Gering Formation, composed of fluvial sediments. Next in the geologic sequence is the Miocene Monroe Creek–Harrison Formations that include eolian features such as cross-bedding and ripple marks. These formations include the caprock, composed of hard, lime-cemented ledges called “pipy” concretions formed when calcium carbonate (lime) precipitated from groundwater.

== Trails at the Monument ==
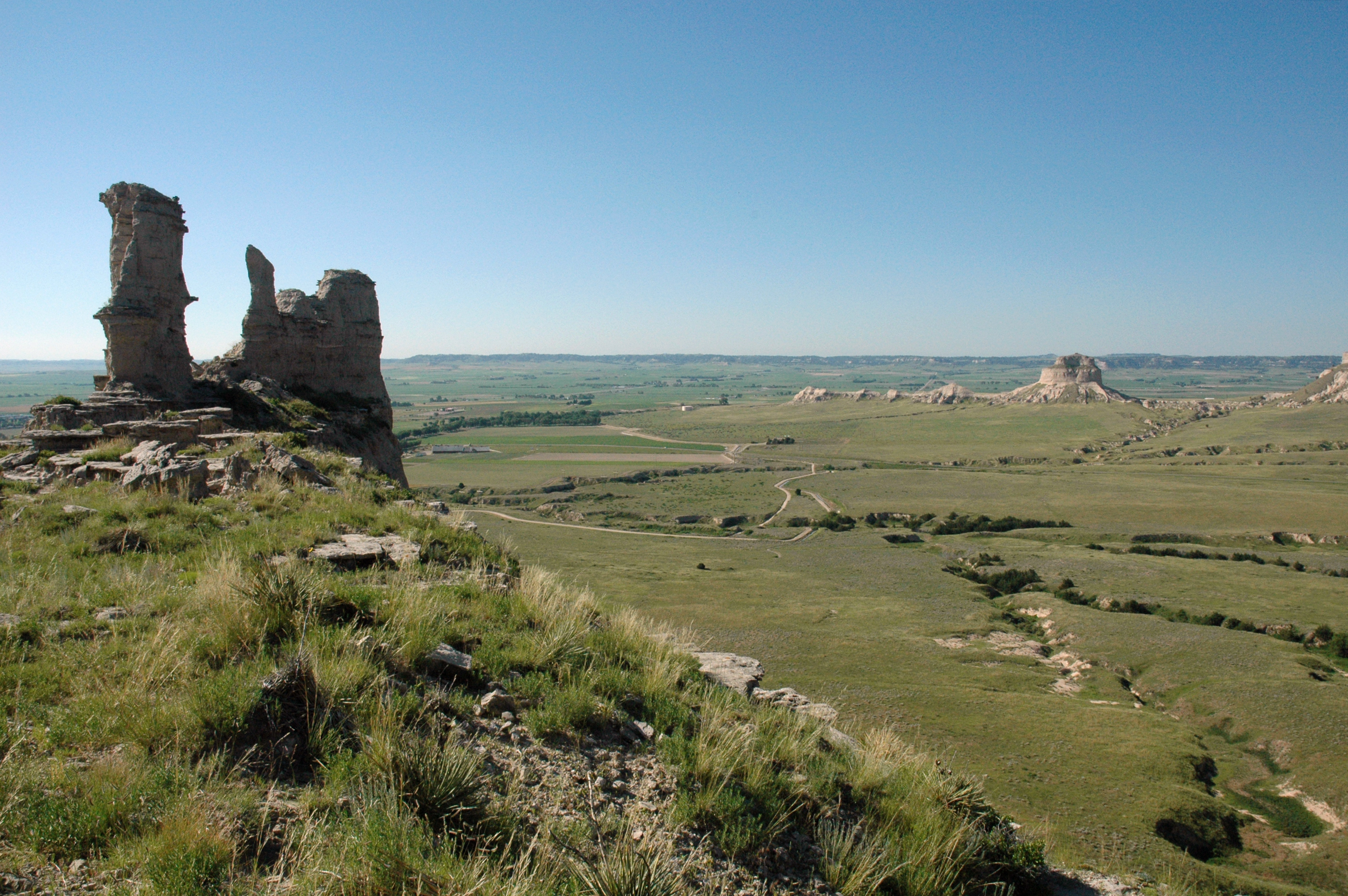
Saddle Rock Trail leads to the summit of Saddle Rock and offers wide views.

Summit Trails
The North Overlook Trail is a 0.5-mile (0.80 km) paved trail that leaves from the summit parking lot and overlooks the North Platte River Valley. Visitors can reach the highest point on the bluff at 4,659 feet (1,420 m) above sea level.
The South Overlook Trail is a 0.4-mile (0.64 km) paved trail that leaves from the summit parking lot towards the south. From the overlook, visitors can see the Visitor Center and Mitchell Pass.
Saddle Rock Trail begins at the Visitor Center and climbs 435 feet (133 m) in 1.6 miles (2.6 km). The first third of the trail is relatively level from the Visitor Center to Scott's Spring. From here, the trail climbs rapidly most of the 435 feet (133 m) in 0.8 miles (1.3 km) to the summit parking lot.
The Oregon Trail Pathway is a short trail ascending 85 feet (26 m) in 0.5 miles (0.80 km). The trail begins at the display of a Murphy and Conestoga wagons and ends in Mitchell Pass.
The Bike Path is the only trail available to users other than hikers. It runs from the Visitor Center to the eastern boundary of the park. It drops 50 feet (15 m) in 1.2 miles (1.9 km).

== Legacy ==
Scotts Bluff County and the city of Scottsbluff were named after the landmark.

During World War II, the United States built hundreds of T2 oil tanker ships and named many of them after national monuments. The SS Scotts Bluff was built in 1944, served in the war, and then its name was changed when it was sold to France in 1948.

=== In popular culture ===
The location Twin Stack Pass in the 2018 Wild West videogame Red Dead Redemption 2 seems to be based on Scotts Bluff National Monument.

== Gallery ==
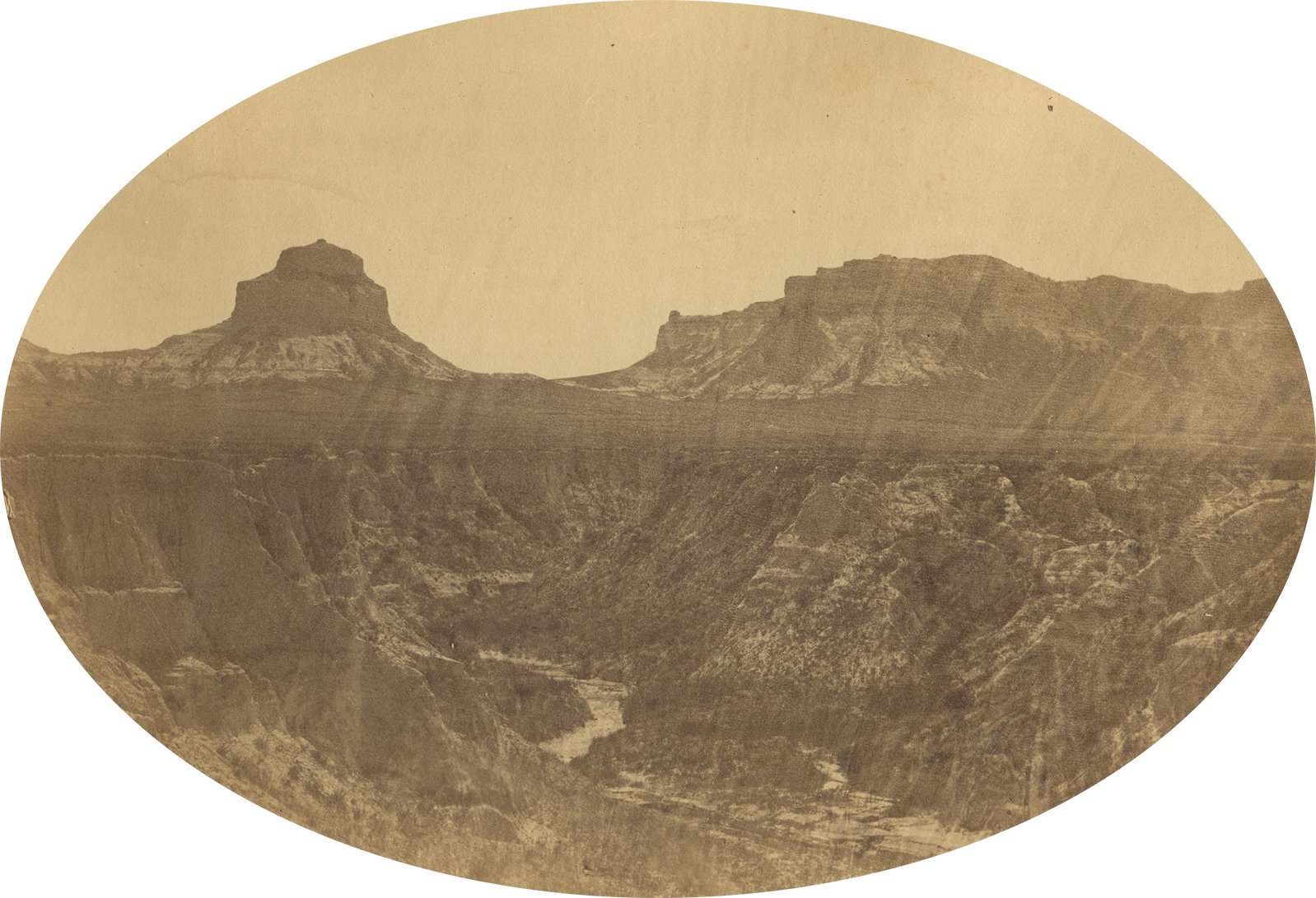
View through Mitchell Pass, July 1858. By Samuel C. Mills, photographer with the Simpson Expedition

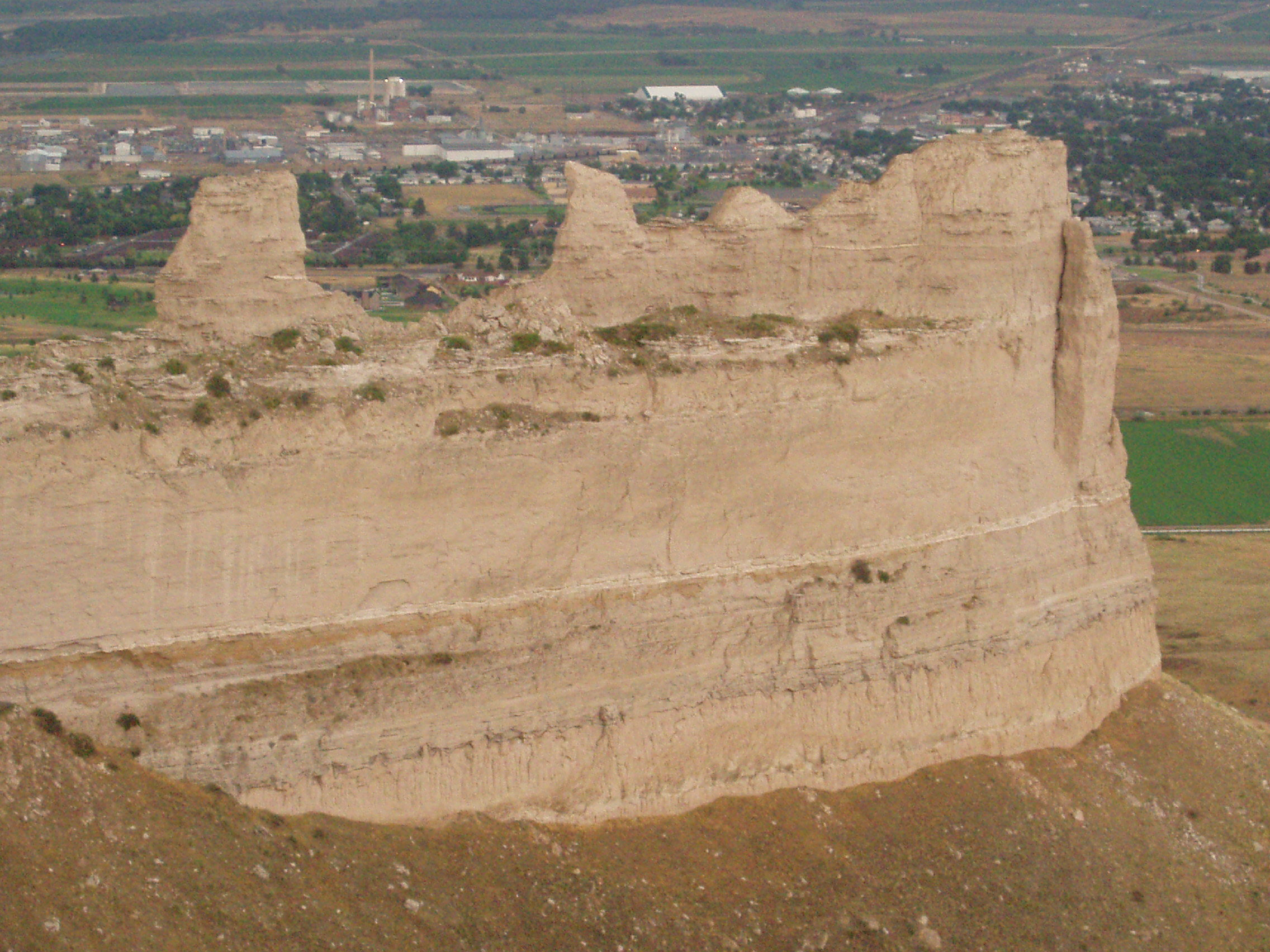
View from the summit

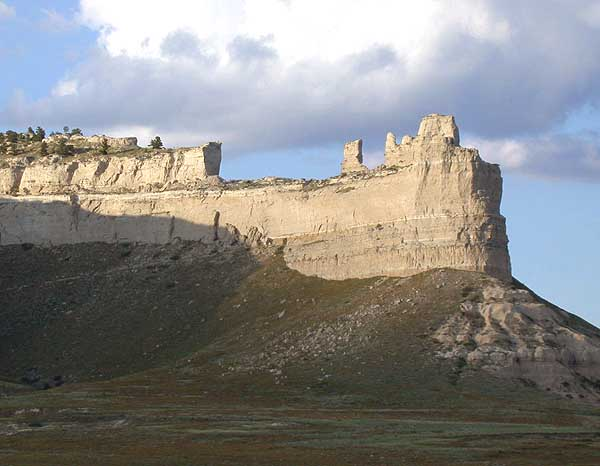
Saddle Rock in Scotts Bluff National Monument

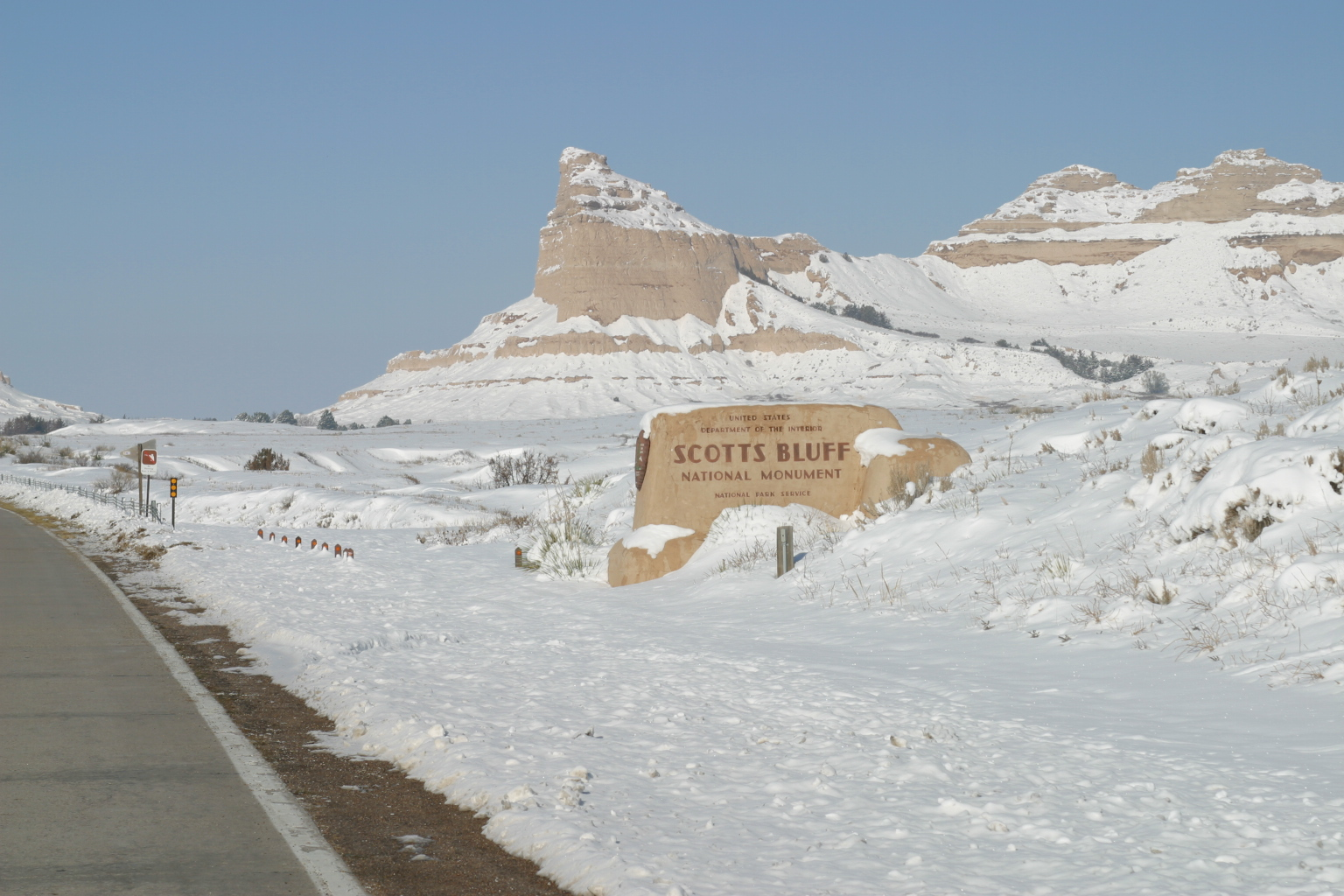
Scotts Bluff during winter (Nov. 2002)

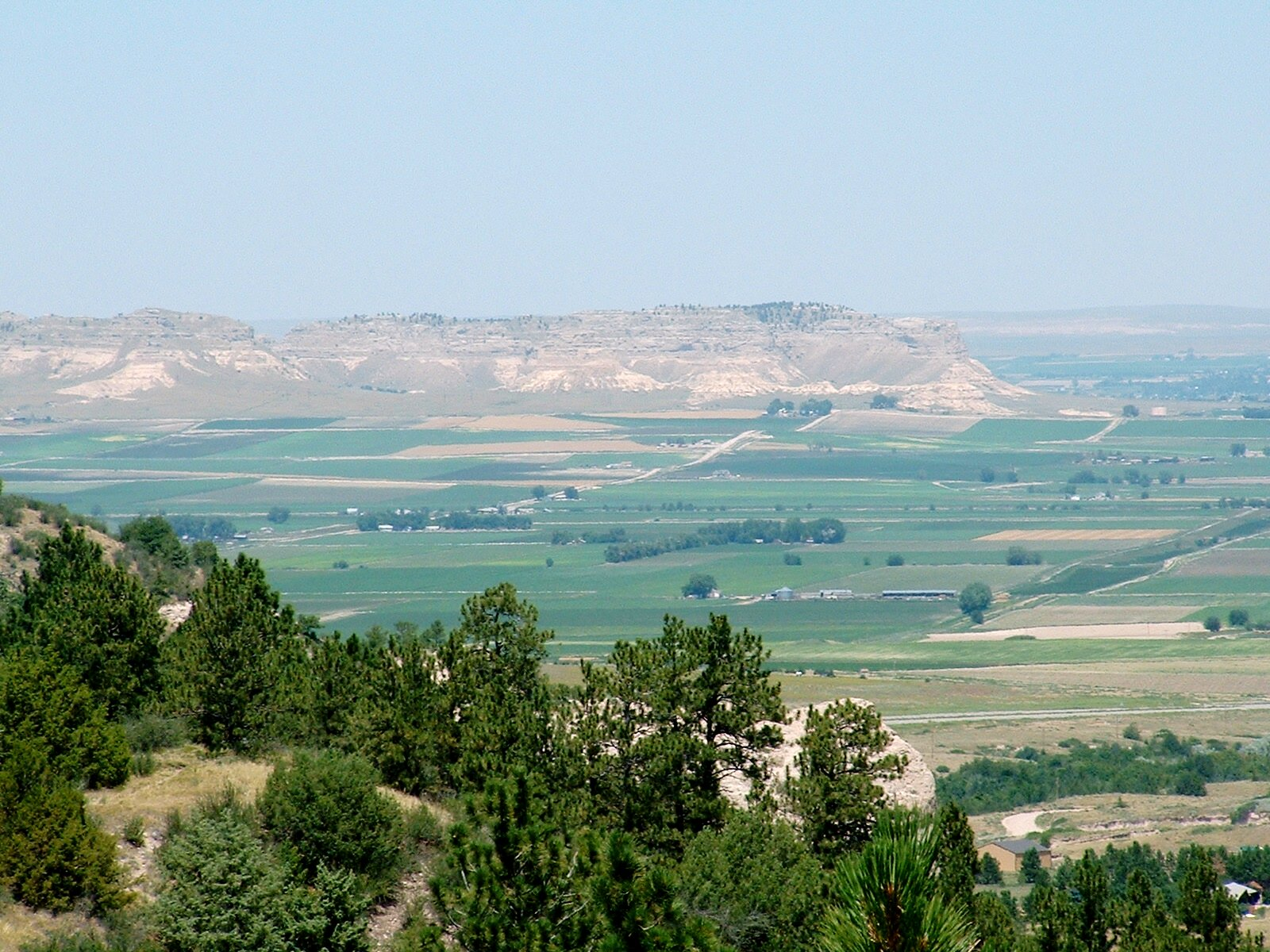
Looking north-northwest at Scottsbluff National Monument, Gering, Nebraska

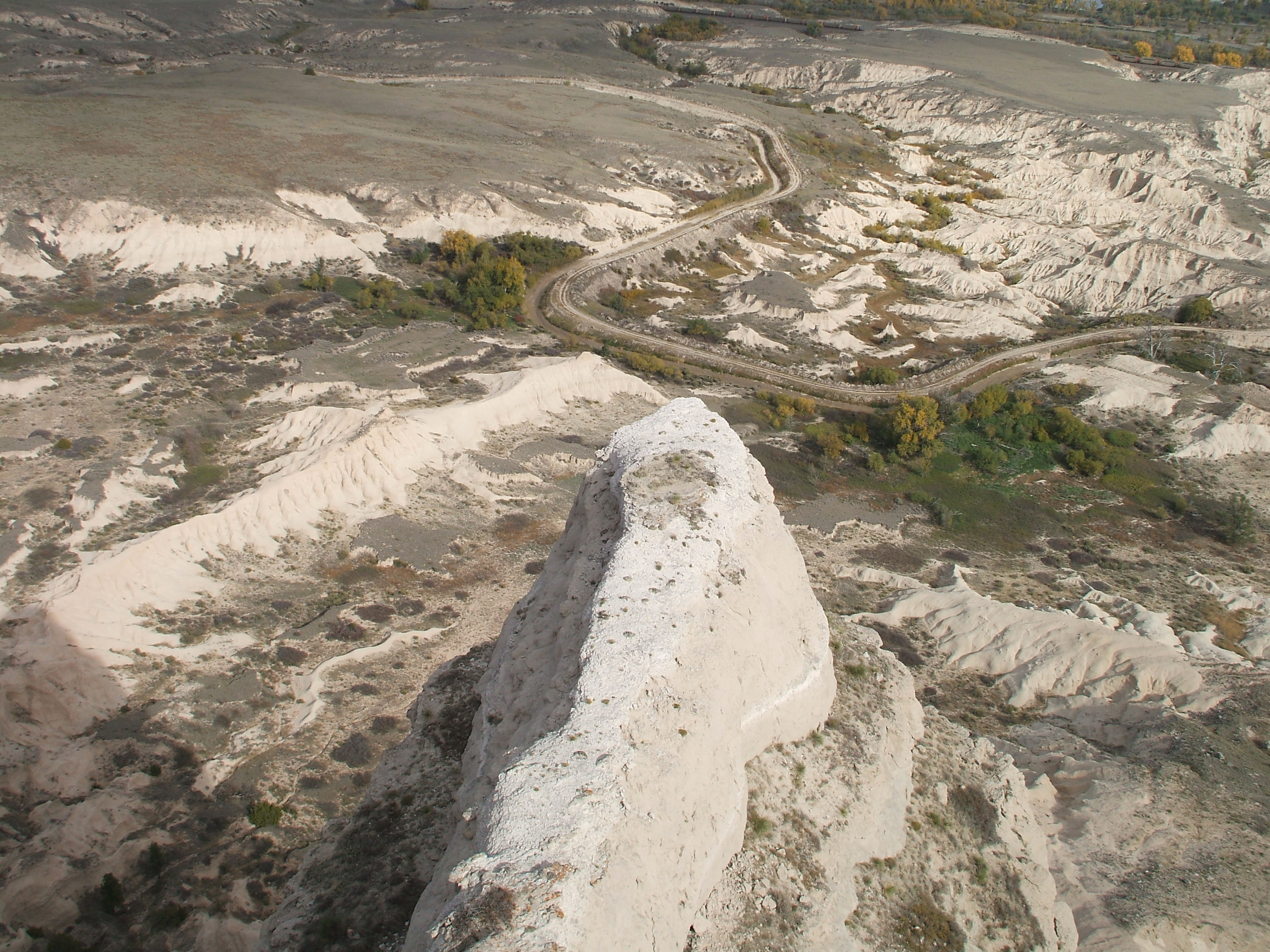
Looking down at road and irrigation ditch to the northeast from Scotts Bluff National Monument

== See also ==
- List of national monuments of the United States
- Landmarks of the Nebraska Territory
- Chimney Rock National Historic Site
- Courthouse and Jail Rocks
- Nebraska Sandhills
- Butte
