= Westward expansion trails =

Overland routes for American settlers

In the history of the United States, American pioneers built overland trails throughout the 19th century, especially between 1860 and 1887 as an alternative to sea and railroad transport. These settlers began to settle much of North America west of the Mississippi River as part of the overland mass settlements of the mid-19th century. Settlers emigrating from the eastern United States did so with various motives, among them economic incentives and escaping religious persecution, via routes such as the Oregon, California, and Mormon Trails. After the end of the Mexican–American War in 1848, vast newly acquired territories again encouraged mass settlement. Legislation like the Donation Land Claim Act and significant events like the California gold rush further encouraged settlers to travel overland to the north and west.

Two major wagon-based trasportation networks, one typically starting in Missouri and the other in the Mexican province of Santa Fe de Nuevo México, served the majority of settlers during the era of westward expansion. Three of the Missouri-based routes—the Oregon, California, and Mormon Trails—were collectively known as the Emigrant Trails. Historians have estimated at least 500,000 emigrants used these three trails between 1843 and 1869, and despite growing competition from transcontinental railroads, some use even continued into the early 20th century. The minor southern routes were the Santa Fe, Southern Emigrant, and Old Spanish Trails, as well as its wagon road successor the Mormon Road, a southern spur of the California Trail used in the winter that also made use of the western half of the Old Spanish Trail. Regardless of the trail used, the journey was often slow and arduous, fraught with risks from dysentery, infectious diseases, dehydration, malnutrition, cholera, highwaymen, Indian raids, injury, and harsh weather, with as many as one in ten travelers dying along the way, usually as a result of disease.

The history of these trails and the settlers who traveled them have since become deeply embedded in the culture and folklore of the United States as some of the most significant influences to shape the content and character of the nation. The remains of many trail ruts can still be observed in various locations throughout the American West. Travelers may loosely follow various routes of the emigrant trails on modern highways through the use of byway signs across the western states.

== Trail choices ==
Pioneers across what became the Western United States in the 19th century had the choice of several routes. Some of the earliest were those of the Mexicans in the southwest. American trade with Northern Mexico created the Hamburg Trail between St. Louis and Santa Fe following an 18th-century route pioneered by the Spanish Empire. From Santa Fe, American traders followed the old El Camino Real de Tierra Adentro southward to Chihuahua by way of El Paso del Norte. The Old Spanish Trail from Santa Fe, in Mexican New Mexico Territory to Los Angeles, in Mexican Alta California, developed in 1829–1830 to support the trade of New Mexican wool products for California horses and mules and carried parties of fur traders and emigrants from New Mexico to Southern California.

Following the trails pioneered by fur traders, the Oregon Trail from Independence, Missouri to the Oregon Territory developed crossing the central Great Plains, Rocky Mountains and northern Great Basin. People followed this trail to take advantage of the fertile land the government gave out. Branching off from that route, some pioneers traveled southwestward on the California Trail from Fort Hall, Oregon Territory to Sutters Fort, in Mexican Alta California. Also branching off to the south was the Mormon Trail from Nauvoo, Illinois to Salt Lake City, Utah Territory. During the twenty-five years 1841–1866, 250,000 to 650,000 people "pulled up stakes," and headed west along these trails. About one-third immigrated to Oregon, one-third to California and one-third to Utah, Colorado, and Montana.

Although it is often stated that the Northern trails began in certain cities on the Missouri River, pioneers following any of the three trails typically left from one of three "jumping off" points on the Missouri's steamboat serviced river ports: Independence, Missouri, Saint Joseph, Missouri, or Council Bluffs, Iowa. Once known as Kanesville, Iowa until 1852; after river dredging in the early 1850s, the latter town at the Missouri-Platte confluence became the most common departure point since it was close in proximity to the River Platte—along which the eastern trails ascend to South Pass above Fort Laramie. The trails from these cities (and several others) converged in the mostly empty flatlands of central Nebraska near present-day Kearney, in the vicinity of Fort Kearney. From their confluence there the combined trails followed in succession the Platte, North Platte, and Sweetwater rivers westward across the full widths of Nebraska and Wyoming, and crossed the continental divide south of the Wind River Range through South Pass in southwestern Wyoming.

The most common vehicle for Oregon and California-bound pioneers was a covered wagon pulled by a team of oxen or mules (which were greatly preferred for their endurance and strength over horses) in the dry semi-arid terrain common to the high plains in the heat of summer. People would form groups of wagons known as wagon trains. In later years, following the advice of Brigham Young, many Mormon emigrants made the crossing to Utah with handcarts. For all pioneers, the scarcity of potable water and fuel for fires was a common brutal challenge on the trip, which was exacerbated by the wide ranging temperature changes common to the mountain highlands and high plains, from 80 to 90 °F (27 to 32 °C) in the day to 40 °F (4 °C) at night. In many treeless areas, buffalo chips were the most common source of fuel.

Routes of the California, Mormon and Oregon Trails west of the Rocky Mountains

During the Mexican–American War, the wagon to California road known as Cooke's Wagon Road, or Sonora Road, was built across Nuevo Mexico, Sonora and Alta California from Santa Fe, New Mexico to San Diego. It crossed what was then the northernmost part of Mexico. During the California Gold Rush the routes to California used were increased by the Siskiyou Trail from Oregon. In the south, the forty-niners used the Cooke Wagon Road, until some found a short cut, the Tucson Cutoff. This route, not closed to travel in winter, permitted travelers coming to New Mexico Territory on the Santa Fe Trail or on the San Antonio-El Paso Road developed in 1849, across West Texas to El Paso where it followed the El Camino Real de Tierra Adentro north to link up to the Cooke's Wagon Road/Southern Emigrant Trail at the cutoff through the San Diego Crossing. In 1856, as part of an improvement of the route as a military road, a cutoff was built to Cooke's Spring from Mesilla, (part of Mexico until 1853). From Cooke's Spring the road ran to the Yuma Crossing into California and on to Los Angeles. This route became the Southern Emigrant Trail. From Los Angeles the goldfields could be reached by land over the two routes north, the old El Camino Viejo or by what became the Stockton – Los Angeles Road. During the Gold Rush era it was these routes by which many herds of sheep and cattle were driven to California and the goldfields.

With the passes of the Sierras and the Rocky Mountains blocked in winter, another winter route, the Mormon Road between Salt Lake City and Los Angeles was developed by a Mormon expedition from their new settlements at and around Salt Lake City, and by some Mormon Battalion soldiers returning to Utah in 1847–1848. The first significant use of the route was by parties of Forty-Niners late in 1849, and by some Mormon trains, to avoid crossing the snow bound Sierra Nevada Mountains by linking up with the Old Spanish Trail in southern Utah and closely following it, with alterations to the route of the mule trails only to allow wagons to traverse it for the first time. Soon afterward it was the route Mormon settlers followed to southwestern Utah, a mission in Las Vegas and a settlement in San Bernardino, California. This wagon route, also called by some of its early travelers the Southern Route, of the California Trail, remained a minor migration route and in the early 1850s a mail route. After some alterations of the route between Cajon Pass and the border of California and in southern Utah, in 1855, it became a significant seasonal trade route between California and Utah, until 1869, when the transcontinental railroad ended Utah's winter isolation.

Up to 50,000 people, or one-tenth of the emigrants who attempted the crossing continent, died during the trip, most from infectious disease such as cholera, spread by poor sanitation: with thousands traveling along or near the same watercourses each summer, downstream travelers were susceptible to ingesting upstream wastewater including bodily waste. Hostile confrontations with Native Americans, although often feared by the settlers, were comparatively rare, prior to the American Civil War. Most settlers traveled in large parties or "trains" of up to several hundred wagons led by a wagon master. In 1859 the government published a guidebook called The Prairie Traveler, in order to help emigrants prepare for the journey.

== Transcontinental Railroad ==
When the Transcontinental Railroad was completed in 1869, the use of these trails, especially the California, Oregon, and Mormon Trails, decreased sharply. While traveling West on the trails could take months and cost extraordinary amounts, the railroad could make the same trip in a fraction of the time for a fraction of the cost.

== Santa Fe Trail ==
The Santa Fe Trail was a 19th-century transportation route through central North America that connected Independence, Missouri with Santa Fe, New Mexico. Pioneered in 1821 by William Becknell, it served as a vital commercial highway until the introduction of the railroad to Santa Fe in 1880. Santa Fe was near the end of the El Camino Real de Tierra Adentro which carried trade from Mexico City.

The route skirted the northern edge and crossed the northwestern corner of Comancheria, the territory of the Comanche, who demanded compensation for granting passage to the trail, and represented another market for American traders. Comanche raiding farther south in Mexico isolated New Mexico, making it more dependent on the American trade, and provided the Comanche with a steady supply of horses for sale. By the 1840s, trail traffic along the Arkansas Valley was so heavy that bison herds could not reach important seasonal grazing land, contributing to their collapse which in turn hastened the decline of Comanche power in the region. The trail was used as the 1846 U.S. invasion route of New Mexico during the Mexican–American War.

After the U.S. acquisition of the Southwest ending the Mexican–American War, the trail helped open the region to U.S. economic development and settlement, playing a vital role in the expansion of the U.S. into the lands it had acquired. The road route is commemorated today by the National Park Service as the Santa Fe National Historic Trail. A highway route that roughly follows the trail's path through the entire length of Kansas, the southeast corner of Colorado and northern New Mexico has been designated as the Santa Fe Trail National Scenic Byw.

== Old Spanish Trail ==
The Old Spanish Trail witnessed a brief but furious heyday between 1830 and 1848 as a trade route linking Santa Fe, New Mexico and Los Angeles, California. The Trail left Santa Fe and split into two routes. The South or Main Branch headed northwest past Colorado's San Juan mountains to near Green River, Utah. The North Branch proceeded due north into Colorado's San Luis Valley and crossed west over Cochetepa Pass to follow the Gunnison and Colorado rivers to meet the Southern Branch near Green River. From central Utah the trail trended southwest to an area now shared by Utah, Nevada and Arizona. It crossed southern Nevada and passed through the Mojave Desert to San Gabriel Mission and Los Angeles.

== Oregon Trail ==
The Oregon Trail, the longest of the overland routes used in the westward expansion of the United States, was first traced by settlers and fur traders for traveling to the Oregon Country. The main route of the Oregon Trail stopped at the Hudson's Bay Company Fort Hall, a major resupply route along the trail near present-day Pocatello and where the California Trail split off to the south. Then the Oregon Trail crossed the Snake River Plain of present-day southern Idaho and the Blue Mountains of northeastern Oregon before reaching the Willamette Valley. It was the only practical way for settlers in wagons without tools, livestock, or supplies to cross the mountains and usually thought critical to the settlement of the American West. Some of the first to travel the Oregon Trail were Christian missionaries, members of the Methodist Episcopal Church who established the Methodist Mission in 1834. Even though they didn't make many converts, they were impressed by the short amount of time needed to reach the Pacific Coast. Rumors about how the sun always shone there and wheat grew as tall as a man attracted American settlers. The journey to the west was pleasant, but there were dangers and challenges along the route. There were diseases: cholera, measles, smallpox, and dysentery. Children were crushed under the covered wagon wheels, people drowned in rivers, were lost, starved, killed by Native Americans (very few settlers), froze to death, trampled by buffalo, or shot by accident. With these accidents, many settlers died. About 20,000 to 30,000 died on the Oregon Trail along the way in 40 years.

American settlers began following the trail in 1841, with the first recorded settler wagon traingroup being the 1843 "Great Migration" of about 900 settlers, led in part by Marcus Whitman. The Provisional Government of Oregon was established by such settlers in 1843, generally limited to the Willamette Valley. The Oregon Treaty of 1846 divided the Oregon Country between Great Britain and the United States, mostly along the 49th parallel. The Territory of Oregon was established shortly afterward, in 1848, and over 12,000 American settlers made the journey there during the decade.

Families usually began their journey at Independence, Missouri, near the Missouri River with the best time to travel is from April to September. The journey to cross the entire Oregon Trail in a covered wagon took from four to six months, following a winding trail 2,000 miles (3,200 km) through prairies, deserts, and across mountains to the Pacific Northwest. The journey was a severe test of strength and endurance so travelers often joined wagon trains traveling about 12–15 miles (19–24 km) per day. Settlers often had to cross flooded rivers. Native American attacked the wagon trains; however, of the 10,000 deaths that occurred from 1835 to 1855, only 4 percent resulted from Native American attacks. Cholera, smallpox, and firearms accidents were the chief causes of death on the trail. Food, water, and wood were always scarce, and the settlers often encountered contaminated water holes. During summer, the trail was crowded with wagon trains, army units, missionaries, hunting parties, traders, and even sightseeing tours. Some settlers complained that they sometimes had to start early in the day in order to find a good campsite ahead of the crowd. Others spoke of the need to wear masks for protection against the dust kicked up by the heavy traffic.

== California Trail ==
The main route of the California Trail branched from the Oregon Trail west of Fort Hall, as immigrants went on forward going southwestward into present-day Nevada, then down along the Humboldt River to the Sierra Nevada. The California Trail came into heavy use after the California Gold Rush enticed over 250,000 gold-seekers and farmers to travel overland the gold fields and rich farmlands of California during the 1840s and 1850s. Today, over 1,000 miles (1,600 km) of trail ruts and traces can still be seen in the vast undeveloped lands between Grand Island, NE and the West Coast.

== Mormon Trail ==
The Mormon Trail was created by members of the Church of Jesus Christ of Latter-day Saints, called "Mormons," who settled in what is now the Great Salt Lake in Utah. The Mormon Trail followed part of the Oregon Trail and then branched off at the fur trading post called Fort Bridger, founded by famed mountain man Jim Bridger. Heading south and following river valleys southwestward to the valley of the Great Salt Lake, Brigham Young led the first Mormons into present-day Utah during 1847. The Mormon Trail is 1,300 miles (2,100 km) long and extends from Nauvoo, Illinois to Salt Lake City, Utah. The Mormon Trail was used for more than 20 years after the Mormons used it and has been reserved for sightseeing. The initial movement of the Mormons from Nauvoo, Illinois to the Valley of the Great Salt Lake occurred in two segments: one in 1846 and one in 1847. The first segment, across Iowa to the Missouri River, covered around 265 miles. The second segment, from the Missouri River to the Valley of the Great Salt Lake, covered about 1,032 miles.

From 1846 to 1869, more than 4,600 Mormons died traveling along an integral part of the road west, the Mormon Pioneer Trail. The trail started in Nauvoo, Illinois, traveled across Iowa, connected with the Great Platte River Road at the Missouri River, and ended near the Great Salt Lake in Utah. Generally following pre-existing routes, the trail carried tens of thousands of Mormons to a new home and refuge in the Great Basin. From their labors arose the State of Deseret, later to become the Utah Territory, and finally the State of Utah.

The Mormon settlers shared similar experiences with others traveling west: the drudgery of walking hundreds of miles, suffocating dust, violent thunderstorms, mud, temperature extremes, bad water, poor forage, sickness, attacks from indians, and death. They recorded their experiences in journals, diaries, and letters. The Mormons, however, were a unique part of this migration. Their move to the Valley of the Great Salt Lake was a response to their violent expulsion from Missouri and Illinois. As it was also motivated by a desire to maintain a religious and cultural identity it was necessary to find an isolated area where they could permanently settle and practice their religion in peace.

== Southern Emigrant Trail ==
The Southern Emigrant Trail was a major land route for immigration into California from the eastern United States that followed the Santa Fe Trail to New Mexico during the California Gold Rush. Unlike the more northern routes, pioneer wagons could travel this route year-round, as the mountain passes were not blocked by snows. But, the trail had the disadvantage of high summer heat and lack of water in the desert regions of New Mexico Territory and the Colorado Desert of California. It was used anyway as a route of travel and commerce between the eastern United States and California. In addition, ranchers drove many herds of cattle and sheep along this route to new markets.

The San Antonio–San Diego Mail Line, operating in 1857–1858, largely followed this route, as did the Butterfield Overland Mail from 1858–1861.

Tied in with the Santa Fe Trail and the San Antonio–El Paso Road, by the El Camino Real de Tierra Adentro the Southern Emigrant Trail route in 1849 ran westward from the El Camino Real to San Diego Crossing. After 1855, it ran from Mesilla, New Mexico, westward to Tucson, Arizona, then followed the Gila River to ferries on the Colorado River near what became Fort Yuma. It crossed the Colorado Desert to Vallecito, then up to Warner's Ranch. From Warner's the road split to run either northwest to Los Angeles or west southwest to San Diego.

From either of these towns, the traveler could continue north by land to the goldfields on the coast, via the El Camino Real, or over the Tejon Pass into the San Joaquin Valley by what would become the Stockton – Los Angeles Road or El Camino Viejo. Alternatively, they could take ships to San Francisco from San Diego or San Pedro.

== See also ==
- Applegate-Lassen Trail
- Donner Party
- Emigrant Trail in Wyoming
- Great Platte River Road
- National Trails System
- Westward the Women
