= List of newspapers in Nebraska =

This is a list of newspapers in the U.S. state of Nebraska. The list is divided between papers currently being produced and those produced in the past and subsequently terminated.

== Daily newspapers ==
- Beatrice Daily Sun – Beatrice
- Columbus Telegram – Columbus
- Fremont Tribune – Fremont
- Grand Island Independent – Grand Island
- Hastings Tribune – Hastings
- Holdrege Daily Citizen – Holdrege
- Kearney Hub – Kearney
- Lincoln Journal Star – Lincoln
- McCook Daily Gazette – McCook
- Norfolk Daily News – Norfolk
- North Platte Telegraph – North Platte
- Omaha World-Herald – Omaha
- Star-Herald – Scottsbluff
- York News-Times – York

== Weekly and semi-weekly newspapers ==
- Ainsworth Star-Journal – Ainsworth
- Albion News – Albion
- Alliance Times-Herald – Alliance
- Antelope County News/Orchard News – Neligh
- Harlan County Journal – Alma
- Ashland Gazette – Ashland
- Nemaha County Herald – Auburn
- Aurora News-Register – Aurora
- Bellevue Leader – Bellevue
- Pilot-Tribune & Enterprise – Blair
- Custer County Chief – Broken Bow
- Burwell Tribune – Burwell
- The Republican-Nonpareil – Central City
- The Chadron Record – Chadron
- Colfax County Press – Clarkson
- Crawford Clipper/Harrison Sun – Crawford
- The Crete News – Crete
- The Banner-Press – David City
- Doniphan Herald – Doniphan
- Elgin Review – Elgin
- Douglas County Post-Gazette – Elkhorn
- Fairbury Journal News – Fairbury
- Falls City Journal – Falls City
- Nance County Journal – Fullerton
- The Nebraska Signal – Geneva
- The North Platte Bulletin - North Platte
- Gering Courier – Gering
- Sheridan County Journal-Star – Gordon
- Gothenburg Leader – Gothenburg
- Grant Tribune-Sentinel – Grant
- Gretna Breeze – Gretna
- Cedar County News – Hartington
- Hebron Journal Register – Hebron
- The Voice News – Hickman
- Humphrey Democrat – Humphrey
- Imperial Republican – Imperial
- Western Nebraska Observer – Kimball
- Laurel Advocate – Laurel
- Lexington Clipper-Herald – Lexington
- Nebraska Farmer – Lincoln
- Sherman County Times – Loup City
- Milford Times – Milford
- Minden Courier – Minden
- Hooker County Tribune – Mullen
- Nebraska City News-Press – Nebraska City
- Neligh News & Leader – Neligh
- Nuckolls County Locomotive-Gazette – Nelson
- North Bend Eagle – North Bend
- Oakland Independent – Oakland
- Osmond Republican – Osmond
- Omaha Star – North Omaha
- Holt County Independent – O'Neill
- The Ord Quiz – Ord
- Garden County News – Oshkosh
- The Pawnee Republican – Pawnee City
- Papillion Times – Papillion
- The Pender Times – Pender
- Petersburg Press – Petersburg
- Pierce County Leader – Pierce
- Plainview News – Plainview
- The Plattsmouth Journal – Plattsmouth
- The Randolph Times – Randolph
- Ralston Recorder – Ralston
- Ravenna News – Ravenna
- Red Cloud Chief – Red Cloud
- Schuyler Sun – Schuyler
- Seward County Independent – Seward
- The Shelton Clipper – Shelton - Gibbon - Wood River - Cairo, Nebraska
- Sidney Sun-Telegraph – Sidney
- Dakota County Star – South Sioux City
- Polk County News – Stromsburg
- Superior Express – Superior
- Clay County News – Sutton
- Syracuse Journal-Democrat – Syracuse
- Tecumseh Chieftain – Tecumseh
- Hitchcock County News – Trenton
- Valentine Midland News – Valentine
- The Verdigre Eagle – Verdigre
- Wahoo Newspaper -- Wahoo
- Wauneta Breeze – Wauneta
- Wausa Gazette – Wausa
- The Waverly News – Waverly
- The Wayne Herald – Wayne
- West Point News – West Point
- Wisner News-Chronicle – Wisner
- Wymore Arbor State – Wymore

== College newspapers ==
- Daily Nebraskan – University of Nebraska–Lincoln
- The Antelope – University of Nebraska at Kearney
- The Gateway – University of Nebraska Omaha
- The Creightonian – Creighton University
- The Wayne Stater – Wayne State College
- The ViewPoint - Northeast Community College
- The Eagle – Chadron State College
- The Doane Owl – Doane University

== Defunct ==
- Afro-American Sentinel – Omaha (1892–1925)
- The Alliance Herald – Alliance (1895–1922)
- The American Record – Plattsmouth (1945–1948)
- Bellevue Gazette – Bellevue (1856–1858)
- The Capital City Courier – Lincoln (1887–1893)
- Cherry County independent – Valentine (1892–1896)
- The Colored Advocate - Omaha (1886)
- The Columbus Journal – Columbus (1878–1911)
- The Commoner – Lincoln (1901–1922)
- The Conservative – Lincoln (1898–1902)
- The Courier – Lincoln (1899–1910)
- Custer County Republican – Broken Bow (1887–1893)
- Dakota City herald – Dakota City (1859–1860)
- Dakota County Herald – Dakota City (1899–1922)
- The Enterprise – Omaha (1893–1920)
- The Falls City Tribune – Falls City (1904–1908)
- Gibbon Reporter – Gibbon (1890–2017)
- The Gothenburg Times – Gothenburg (1908–2022)
- Heartland Messenger – Omaha (2006–2008)
- Hesperian Student – Lincoln (1844–1890)
- Lincoln County Tribune – North Platte (1885–1890)
- Metro Star Times - Omaha (1990-1991)
- The McCook Tribune – McCook (1885–1912)
- McCook weekly tribune – McCook (1883–1885)
- The Monitor – Omaha (1915–1929)
- Nebraska Advertiser – Brownville (1856–1899)
- The Nebraska Advertiser – Nemaha City (1899–1908)
- Nebraska Palladium – Bellevue (1854–1855)
- Nebraska State Journal – Lincoln (1867–1951)
- The New Era – Omaha (1921–1926)
- The Norfolk Weekly News-Journal – Norfolk (1900–1912)
- The Norfolk weekly news – Norfolk (1899–1900)
- The North Platte Semi-Weekly Tribune – North Platte (1895–1922)
- The North Platte Tribune – North Platte (1890–1894)
- The Omaha Advocate - Omaha (1923-1925)
- Omaha Chronicle – Omaha (1933–1938)
- Omaha Daily Bee – Omaha (1872–1927; Omaha Bee-News, 1927–1937)
- Omaha Guide – Omaha (1927–1958)
- Omaha Journal - Omaha (1934-1936)
- Omaha Sun – Omaha (1951–1983)
- The Omaha Whip – Omaha (1922)
- Ozvěna západu – Clarkson (1914–1917)
- The Plattsmouth Daily Herald – Plattsmouth (1883–1892)
- The Plattsmouth Herald – Plattsmouth (1892–1910)
- The Plattsmouth Journal – Plattsmouth (1821–1939)
- The Plattsmouth Weekly Herald – Plattsmouth (1865–1900)
- The Plattsmouth Weekly Journal – Plattsmouth (1890–1901)
- Přítel lidu – Wahoo (1895–1904)
- The Progress – Omaha (1889–1906)
- The Red Cloud Chief – Red Cloud (1873–1923)
- Saturday morning courier – Lincoln (1893–1894)
- Scottsbluff Republican – Scottsbluff(1900-1964)
- Semi-Weekly News-Herald – Plattsmouth (1894–1898)
- Sunday Morning Courier – Lincoln (1893–1893)
- Tri-City Trib – Cozad (1965-2022)
- Valentine Democrat – Valentine (1900–1912)
- The Valentine Democrat – Valentine (1896–1898)
- Western News-Democrat – Valentine (1898–1900)
- Wilberské listy – Wilber (1905–1914)
- The Huntsman's Echo – Wood River (1860–1861)

== See also ==
Comprehensive

- Lists of newspapers
- List of newspapers in the United States

Frequency

- List of free daily newspapers in the United States
- List of weekly newspapers in the United States

Circulation

- List of international newspapers originating in the United States
- List of national newspapers in the United States
- List of newspapers in the United States by circulation
- List of newspapers serving cities over 100,000 in the United States

Foreign language

- List of French-language newspapers published in the United States
- List of German-language newspapers published in the United States
- List of Spanish-language newspapers published in the United States

Specialty

- List of African-American newspapers in the United States
- List of alternative weekly newspapers in the United States
- List of business newspapers in the United States
- List of family-owned newspapers in the United States
- List of Jewish newspapers in the United States
- List of LGBTQ periodicals in the United States
- List of student newspapers in the United States
- List of supermarket tabloids in the United States
- List of underground press in the United States

Other

- List of defunct newspapers of the United States
