= Nebraska Legislature 48th district =

American legislative district

Nebraska's 48th legislative district
- Map of Nebraska Legislature districts with the 48th district shaded in red
Senator
| Brian Hardin; R–Gering |
since 2023
- Demographics: 79.6% White; 0.7% Black; 21.2% Hispanic; 0.7% Asian; 2% Native American
- Population (2020): 40,192

The Nebraska Legislature's 48th district is one of the 49 legislative districts in the Nebraska Legislature. The district is located in far western Nebraska and covers Banner, Kimball, and Scotts Bluff counties. Notable settlements in the area include Gering, Scottsbluff, Mitchell, Kimball, and Harrisburg. Brian Hardin has represented the district since 2023.

== Demographics ==
The US Census Bureau recorded the population as of 2020 at 40,192.

- 79.6% of the district is White.
- 21.2% of the district is Hispanic.
- 2% of the district is Native American.
- 0.7% of the district is Asian.
- 0.7% of the district is Black.

== List of representatives ==
| Representative | Party | Years of service | Legislature | Residence |
|---|---|---|---|---|
| Brian Hardin | Republican | 2023 - present | 108th-109th | Gering |
| John Stinner | Republican | 2015-2023 | 104th-107th | Gering |
| John Harms | Republican | 2007-2015 | 100th-103rd | Scottsbluff |
