= Gering Courier Building =

- U.S. National Register of Historic Places
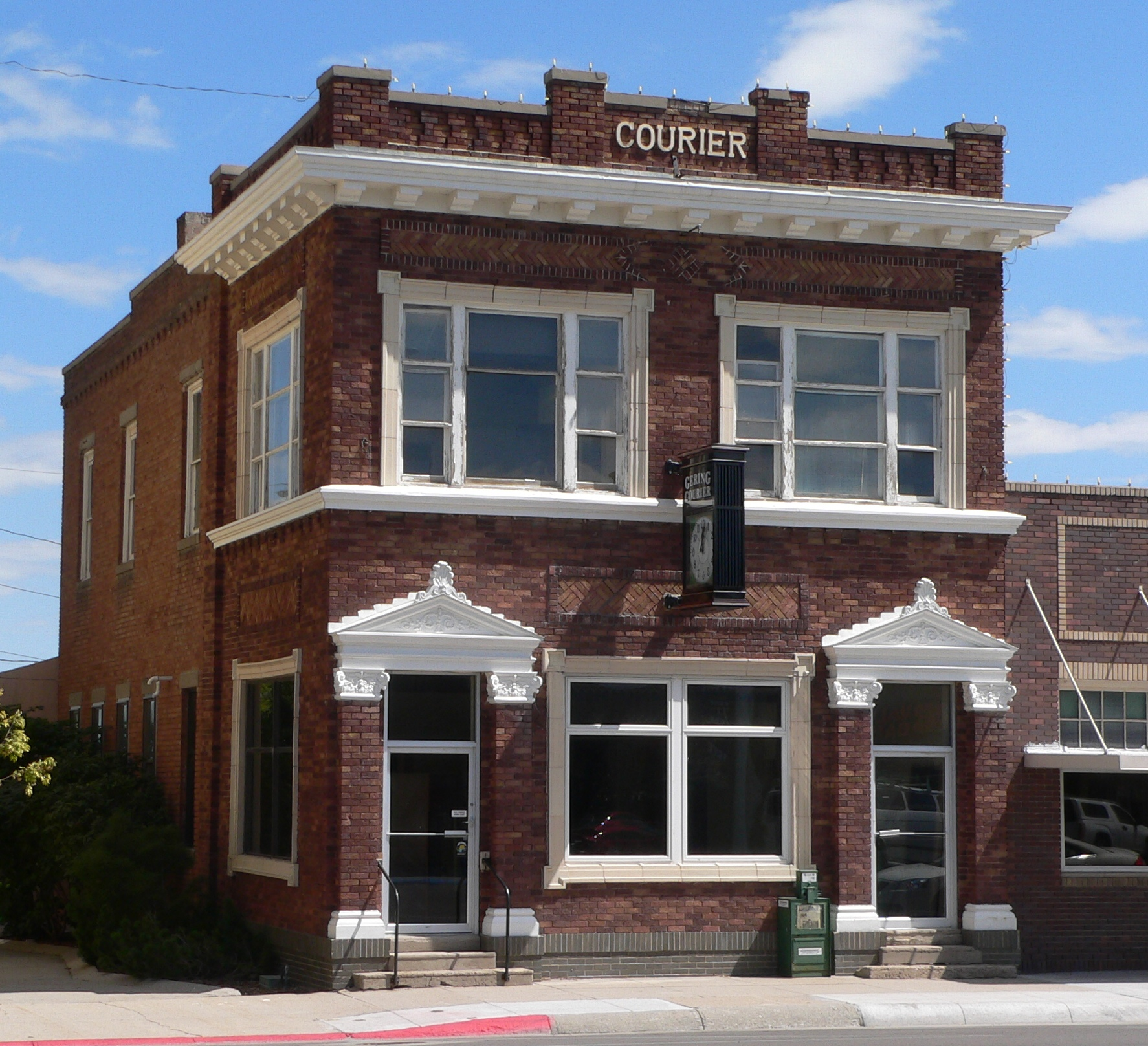
- The building in 2010

- Location within Nebraska Location within the United States
- Location: 1428 10th Street, Gering, Nebraska
- Coordinates: 41°49′23″N 103°39′34″W
- Area: less than one acre
- Built: 1915
- Architect: Jens C. Pederson
- Architectural style: Classical Revival
- NRHP reference No.: 04000799
- Added to NRHP: October 15, 2004

The Gering Courier Building is a historic building in Gering, Nebraska. It was built in 1915 as the third headquarters of the Gering Courier, whose founding editor, Asa Wood, served as a member of the Nebraska Senate. He was followed by his son, Warren C. Wood, who served in World War II. The building was designed in the Classical Revival style, "with symmetrical pedimented entrances flanked by pilasters and a parapeted roofline with a large classical cornice." It has been listed on the National Register of Historic Places since October 15, 2004.
