= John Stinner =

American politician (born 1951)

Member of the Nebraska Legislature from the 48th district
- In office January 7, 2015 – January 4, 2023
- Preceded by: John Harms
- Succeeded by: Brian Hardin

Personal details
- Born: October 11, 1951 (age 75) Pittsburgh, Pennsylvania, U.S.
- Party: Republican
- Occupation: banker

John Stinner (born October 11, 1951) is an American politician from Nebraska. In 2014, he was elected to the Nebraska Legislature, representing District 48 which includes Scotts Bluff County. Stinner is a member of the Republican Party.

== Early life and career ==
Stinner was born in Pittsburgh, Pennsylvania, on October 11, 1951. In 1969, he graduated from Montour High School in the Pittsburgh area. He accepted an athletic scholarship to play football at the University of Nebraska–Lincoln; there, he was a member of the teams that won national championships in 1970 and 1971. In 1973, he obtained a B.S. in business administration; in 1976, an M.A. in economics.

Following his graduation, Stinner worked in Lincoln, first as a CPA for Peat Marwick Mitchell, then as senior lender and head internal auditor for First Commerce Bancshares. In 1988, he and a group of investors founded Gering State Bank, in the city of Gering in the western Nebraska Panhandle. In 1997, the bank was renamed Valley Bank and Trust Co. In 2011, it expanded into the front range of Colorado, where it operated as Western States Bank. As of 2016, it had eight locations in six western Nebraska communities: Gering, Scottsbluff, Bayard, Ogallala, Grant, and Wauneta; and three locations in Fort Collins and Loveland, Colorado.

Stinner was elected to the Gering School Board in 2000, and served from 2001 to 2004, including a stint as the board's president. In 2007, he was appointed to fill a vacancy on the board. He eventually served a total of ten years on the board, five of them as president.

In 2013, Stinner was elected chairman of the Nebraska Bankers Association (NBA); the organization is described as providing "education, financial services, lobbying, and other industry functions" for its membership, which consists of nearly all of the commercial banks and savings institutions in the state. According to the Nebraska chapter of Common Cause, the NBA spent a total of $740,000 on lobbying over the five-year span from 2011 through 2015, making it the fifth-highest spender among lobbying organizations in the state.

== Nebraska legislature ==
=== 2014 election ===
In early 2014, Stinner announced that he would run for the Nebraska legislature from District 48, coterminous with Scotts Bluff County and including the cities of Gering and Scottsbluff. The incumbent, John Harms, was ineligible to run for a third consecutive term under Nebraska's term-limits law.

In the officially nonpartisan race, Stinner, a member of the Republican Party, faced Scottsbluff attorney and United States Army veteran Mike Meister, who unsuccessfully ran for Nebraska Attorney General in 2002 and Governor of Nebraska in 2010 as a Democrat. Both Meister and Stinner stated that the state's tax system needed to change. Both expressed support for infrastructure improvements, including the completion of the Heartland Expressway, a planned multilane divided highway running roughly north-south across the Panhandle and passing through the Scottsbluff-Gering area. Meister favored the proposed expansion of Medicaid in Nebraska under the provisions of the 2010 Affordable Care Act; Stinner favored some alternative approaches to providing access to basic health services. Meister supported a ballot initiative to raise the state's minimum wage; Stinner equivocated, saying that there was evidence both for and against such a measure.

In the nonpartisan primary election, Stinner received 3919 votes, or 75.2% of the total, to Meister's 1292 votes, or 24.8%. Since there were only two candidates, both moved on to the general election, which Stinner won with 6484 votes, or 70.2% of the total, to Meister's 2757 votes, or 29.8%.

== Personal life ==
Stinner married in 1972; he and his wife Rita have two children, Named John and Cecilia Stinner and they both have two kids Henry 13, John the third 15, Madelyn 17, and Bradley 7
