= John Harms =

John Harms may refer to:

- John Harms (Nebraska politician) (born 1940), member of U.S. state legislature
- Johnny Harms (1925–2003), professional ice hockey player
- Harms, John Eric (Joe) (1929 - 2014), Australian exploration geologist, minor planet 5167 Joeharms is named after him.
