= First Nebraska Bank =

First Nebraska Bank is a state-chartered commercial bank headquartered in Valley, Nebraska. Founded in 1885, First Nebraska Bank is one of the oldest banking companies in Nebraska, with over $259 million in assets as of December 31, 2012. As of 2026, the bank has 15 offices in Nebraska, with locations in Arcadia, Bennet, Brainard, Columbus, Decatur, Elkhorn, Emerson, Nebraska City, Stanton, Valley, and Weeping Water. Primary federal oversight for the bank is provided by the Federal Reserve Bank of Kansas City, while state oversight is provided by the Nebraska Department of Banking and Finance.

== Ownership and Management ==
First Nebraska Bank is a privately held company. It is 100% owned by Valley Bank Shares, Inc., a bank holding company, which also owns 100% of First Nebraska Insurance Group, Inc., an insurance agency with five offices in central and eastern Nebraska.

Clark Lehr is the bank's current chairman and chief executive officer. In May, 2012, at the Annual Convention of the Nebraska Bankers Association (NBA), a state association for the Nebraska banking industry, Lehr was elected chairman of that organization. Clark previously served as member and chairman of the NBA Executive Management Committee, and also was a member of the NBA Marketing Committee.

Lydell "Woody" Woodbury is the bank's current chief operating officer. Woodbury also served as the 2005-2006 Government Relations Committee Chairman for the Nebraska Bankers Association.

== Acquisitions ==
On August 1, 2012, First Nebraska Bank closed on the acquisition of Heartland Community Bank. Heartland's branches in Avoca, Bennet, Nebraska City, and Weeping Water were rebranded as branches of First Nebraska Bank.
