= Northfield Park Arboretum =

Public park and arboretum in Gering, Nebraska, United States

Coordinates: 41°50′07″N 103°40′07″W

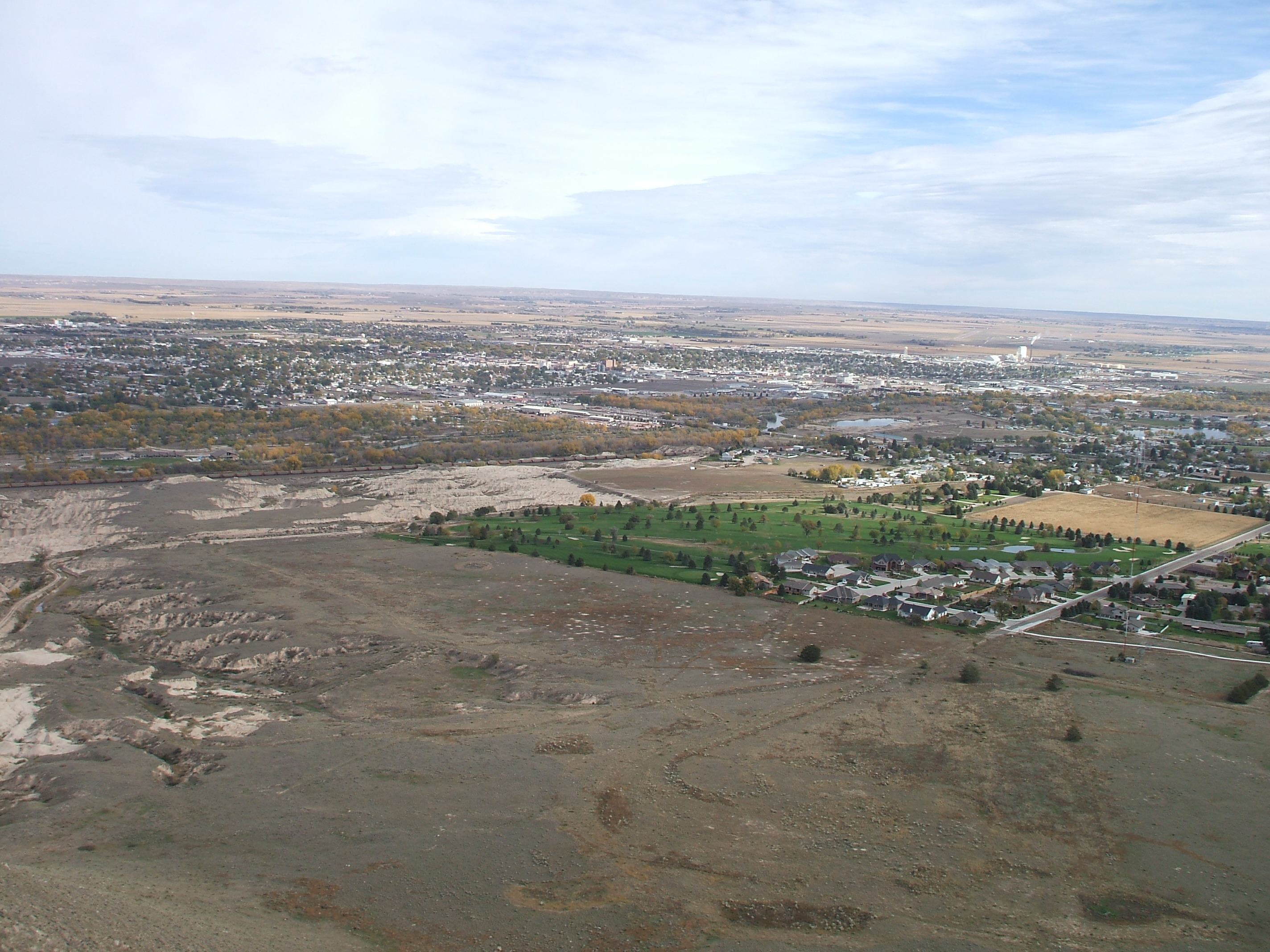
- Northfield Park Arboretum
- Interactive map of Northfield Park Arboretum
- Website: Official website

Northfield Park Arboretum is a public park and arboretum located in Gering, Nebraska.

== History ==
The Northfield Park Arboretum was once a long and narrow canyon, and now is considered a "living exhibition" of trees, shrubs, and other botanical life that grows in the Gering region. It has the traditional arboretum "park" setting, with plants that need additional care to thrive in the area, as well as a "natural" area that displays native plants adapted to the park's conditions.

== Staff ==
Curator of Northfield Park Arboretum is Amy Seiler (Parks Director at City of Gering).

== See also ==
- List of botanical gardens in the United States
