= John D. Reynolds =

American politician (1870–1958)

Member of the Nebraska Legislature from the 14th district
- In office January 5, 1937 – January 3, 1939
- Preceded by: Position created
- Succeeded by: Martin Mischke

Member of the Nebraska State Senate from the 10th district
- In office January 1, 1935 – January 5, 1937
- Preceded by: J. P. O'Furey
- Succeeded by: Position abolished

Personal details
- Born: June 10, 1870 Vermont
- Died: August 23, 1958 (aged 88) Niobrara, Nebraska
- Party: Republican
- Spouse: Annie Ortman (m. 1899)
- Children: 10
- Occupation: Farmer, businessman, police officer

John D. Reynolds (June 10, 1870 – August 23, 1958) was a Republican politician from Nebraska who served in the Nebraska State Senate from 1935 to 1937 and as a member of the Nebraska Legislature from the 14th district from 1937 to 1939.

== Early life ==
Reynolds was born in Vermont in 1870 and moved to Nebraska in 1890. He was a police officer and worked in the mercantile business before raising livestock. Reynolds was active in the local farming community, serving as the director of the local chapter of the National Farmers Union.

== Nebraska State Senate ==
In 1934, Reynolds ran for the Nebraska State Senate, challenging Democratic State Senator J. P. O'Furey in the 10th district, which included Cedar and Knox counties. He won the general election by a wide margin, receiving 59 percent of the vote to O'Furey's 41 percent.

== Nebraska Legislature ==
When the two chambers of the state legislature were consolidated into a unicameral legislature, Reynolds ran for the newly created 14th district in 1936. In the nonpartisan primary, he ran against State House Speaker W. H. O'Gara, State Representative Martin Schroeder, Joseph Kuehn, and Fred Hoesing. Reynolds placed first in the primary and advanced to the general election with O'Gara, and ultimately defeated him with 56 percent of the vote.

In 1938, Reynolds ran for re-election and was challenged by Martin Mischke, Cornelius Heckt, and Martin Nelson. He placed first in the primary with 36 percent of the vote, and advanced to the general election with Mischke. Mischke defeated Reynolds with 53 percent of the vote.

== Death ==
Reynolds died on August 23, 1958.
