= Valley, Nebraska =

City in Douglas County, Nebraska, United States

- City
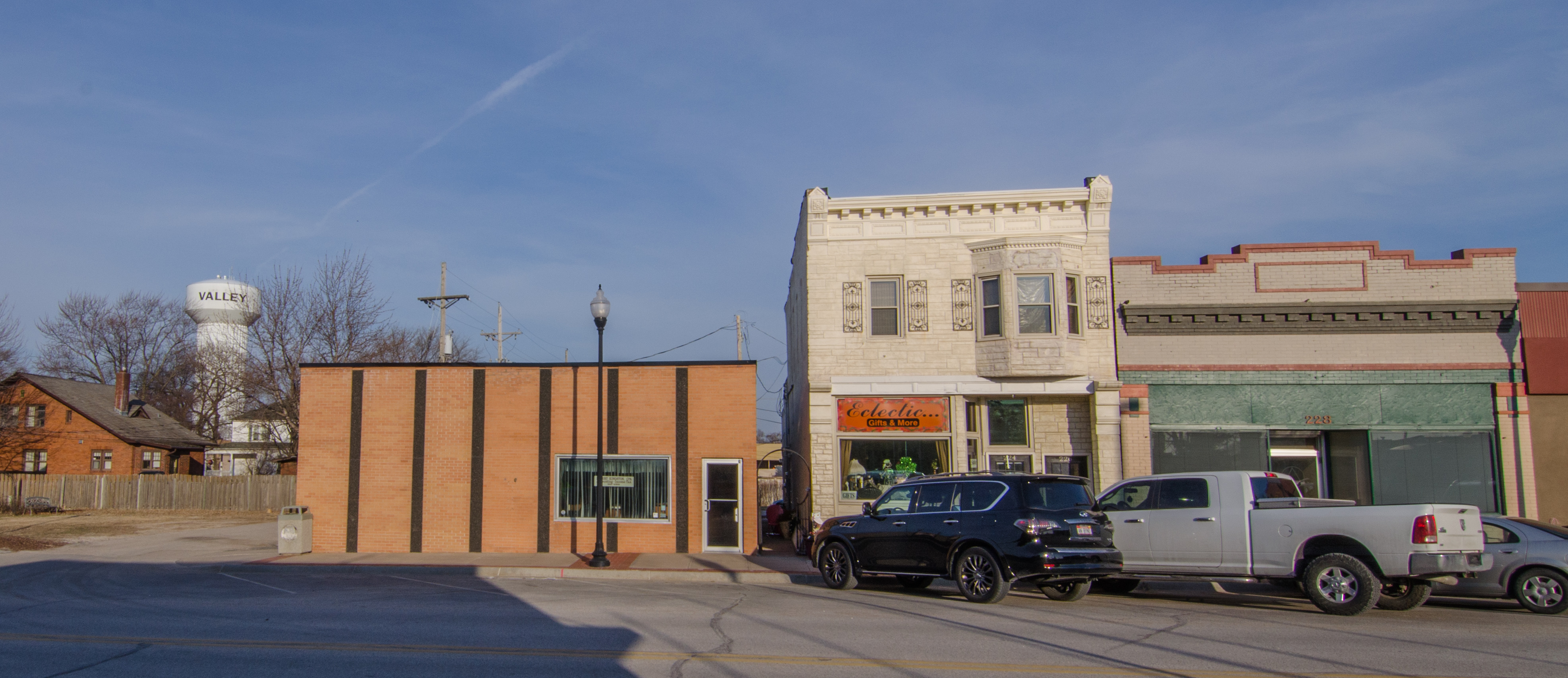
- Downtown Valley, March 2017

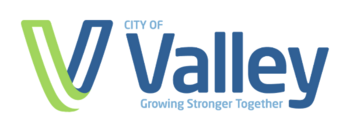
- logo

- Location of Valley, Nebraska
- Coordinates: 41°18′53″N 96°21′22″W
- Country: United States
- State: Nebraska
- County: Douglas

Government
  - Mayor: Cindy Grove

Area
  - Total: 6.06 sq mi (15.69 km^{2})
  - Land: 4.86 sq mi (12.58 km^{2})
  - Water: 1.20 sq mi (3.11 km^{2})
- Elevation: 1,139 ft (347 m)

Population (2020)
  - Total: 3,037
  - Estimate (2026): 3,485
  - Density: 625.2/sq mi (241.39/km^{2})
- Time zone: UTC-6 (Central (CST))
  - Summer (DST): UTC-5 (CDT)
- ZIP code: 68064
- Area code: 402
- FIPS code: 31-50020
- GNIS feature ID: 2397110
- Website: http://www.valleyne.org/

Valley is a city in Douglas County, Nebraska, United States. The population was 3,037 at the 2020 census.

Valley is also home to the area's National Weather Service office, serving portions of eastern Nebraska and southwestern Iowa.

== History ==
Valley was laid out as a town in 1864 when it was certain that the Union Pacific Transcontinental Railroad would be extended to that point. It was named for the Platte River valley.

== Geography ==
Valley is located at 41°18′51″N 96°20′54″W (41.314199, -96.348250).

According to the United States Census Bureau, the city has a total area of 3.62 square miles (9.38 km^{2}), of which 3.56 square miles (9.22 km^{2}) is land and 0.06 square miles (0.16 km^{2}) is water.

=== Climate ===
Climate data for Valley NWS, Nebraska (1991–2020 normals, extremes 1994–present)
Month	Jan	Feb	Mar	Apr	May	Jun	Jul	Aug	Sep	Oct	Nov	Dec	Year
Record high °F (°C)	69 (21)	78 (26)	88 (31)	93 (34)	100 (38)	102 (39)	105 (41)	102 (39)	103 (39)	93 (34)	84 (29)	73 (23)	105 (41)
Mean maximum °F (°C)	55.2 (12.9)	60.9 (16.1)	74.3 (23.5)	84.4 (29.1)	90.0 (32.2)	94.2 (34.6)	96.5 (35.8)	95.1 (35.1)	91.9 (33.3)	84.8 (29.3)	72.4 (22.4)	58.1 (14.5)	97.9 (36.6)
Mean daily maximum °F (°C)	32.9 (0.5)	37.5 (3.1)	50.4 (10.2)	62.4 (16.9)	72.9 (22.7)	82.9 (28.3)	86.5 (30.3)	84.3 (29.1)	78.1 (25.6)	65.1 (18.4)	49.9 (9.9)	36.9 (2.7)	61.6 (16.4)
Daily mean °F (°C)	24.1 (−4.4)	28.2 (−2.1)	40.2 (4.6)	51.7 (10.9)	63.0 (17.2)	73.5 (23.1)	77.3 (25.2)	74.8 (23.8)	67.1 (19.5)	54.2 (12.3)	40.2 (4.6)	28.6 (−1.9)	51.9 (11.1)
Mean daily minimum °F (°C)	15.3 (−9.3)	18.9 (−7.3)	29.9 (−1.2)	40.9 (4.9)	53.1 (11.7)	64.0 (17.8)	68.1 (20.1)	65.3 (18.5)	56.0 (13.3)	43.2 (6.2)	30.6 (−0.8)	20.3 (−6.5)	42.1 (5.6)
Mean minimum °F (°C)	−7.4 (−21.9)	−2.6 (−19.2)	8.0 (−13.3)	24.8 (−4.0)	37.8 (3.2)	51.1 (10.6)	56.0 (13.3)	53.7 (12.1)	40.0 (4.4)	26.1 (−3.3)	13.7 (−10.2)	−1.7 (−18.7)	−10.8 (−23.8)
Record low °F (°C)	−21 (−29)	−24 (−31)	−10 (−23)	14 (−10)	30 (−1)	40 (4)	49 (9)	46 (8)	29 (−2)	14 (−10)	2 (−17)	−14 (−26)	−24 (−31)
Average precipitation inches (mm)	0.85 (22)	1.03 (26)	1.78 (45)	3.11 (79)	4.74 (120)	5.29 (134)	3.97 (101)	4.30 (109)	3.02 (77)	2.37 (60)	1.37 (35)	1.32 (34)	33.15 (842)
Average snowfall inches (cm)	7.4 (19)	9.5 (24)	5.0 (13)	1.4 (3.6)	0.1 (0.25)	0.0 (0.0)	0.0 (0.0)	0.0 (0.0)	0.0 (0.0)	1.0 (2.5)	1.2 (3.0)	6.2 (16)	31.8 (81)
Average precipitation days (≥ 0.01 in)	6.1	6.6	8.5	10.6	13.0	11.3	9.2	10.0	8.0	7.6	5.8	6.2	102.9
Average snowy days (≥ 0.1 in)	5.2	5.2	3.0	1.0	0.0	0.0	0.0	0.0	0.0	0.5	1.5	4.9	21.3
Source: NOAA

== Demographics ==
Historical population
Census	Pop.	Note	%±
1880	42		—
1890	378		800.0%
1900	534		41.3%
1910	810		51.7%
1920	764		−5.7%
1930	1,039		36.0%
1940	985		−5.2%
1950	1,113		13.0%
1960	1,452		30.5%
1970	1,595		9.8%
1980	1,716		7.6%
1990	1,775		3.4%
2000	1,788		0.7%
2010	1,875		4.9%
2020	3,037		62.0%
U.S. Decennial Census; 2013 Estimate

=== 2020 census ===
As of the 2020 census, Valley had a population of 3,037. The median age was 44.7 years. 23.2% of residents were under the age of 18 and 19.3% of residents were 65 years of age or older. For every 100 females there were 95.8 males, and for every 100 females age 18 and over there were 88.3 males age 18 and over.

0.0% of residents lived in urban areas, while 100.0% lived in rural areas.

There were 1,265 households in Valley, of which 30.6% had children under the age of 18 living in them. Of all households, 52.8% were married-couple households, 15.7% were households with a male householder and no spouse or partner present, and 25.8% were households with a female householder and no spouse or partner present. About 28.6% of all households were made up of individuals and 13.9% had someone living alone who was 65 years of age or older.

There were 1,523 housing units, of which 16.9% were vacant. The homeowner vacancy rate was 7.4% and the rental vacancy rate was 9.1%.

Racial composition as of the 2020 census
Race	Number	Percent
White	2,792	91.9%
Black or African American	35	1.2%
American Indian and Alaska Native	18	0.6%
Asian	19	0.6%
Native Hawaiian and Other Pacific Islander	1	0.0%
Some other race	39	1.3%
Two or more races	133	4.4%
Hispanic or Latino (of any race)	95	3.1%

=== 2010 census ===
As of the census of 2010, there were 1,875 people, 804 households, and 489 families living in the city. The population density was 526.7 inhabitants per square mile (203.4/km^{2}). There were 871 housing units at an average density of 244.7 units per square mile (94.5 units/km^{2}). The racial makeup of the city was 95.3% White, 1.3% African American, 0.4% Native American, 0.5% Asian, 1.1% from other races, and 1.3% from two or more races. Hispanic or Latino of any race were 4.1% of the population.

There were 804 households, of which 29.6% had children under the age of 18 living with them, 44.3% were married couples living together, 11.2% had a female householder with no husband present, 5.3% had a male householder with no wife present, and 39.2% were non-families. 34.3% of all households were made up of individuals, and 15.8% had someone living alone who was 65 years of age or older. The average household size was 2.26 and the average family size was 2.90.

The median age in the city was 42.3 years. 23.9% of residents were under the age of 18; 7.5% were between the ages of 18 and 24; 22.2% were from 25 to 44; 28.6% were from 45 to 64; and 17.8% were 65 years of age or older. The gender makeup of the city was 47.8% male and 52.2% female.

=== 2000 census ===
As of the census of 2000, there were 1,788 people, 696 households, and 455 families living in the city. The population density was 1,180.2 inhabitants per square mile (455.7/km^{2}). There were 760 housing units at an average density of 501.6 units per square mile (193.7 units/km^{2}). The racial makeup of the city was 96.81% White, 0.56% African American, 0.50% Native American, 0.34% Asian, 0.06% Pacific Islander, 0.95% from other races, and 0.78% from two or more races. Hispanic or Latino of any race were 1.79% of the population.

There were 696 households, out of which 35.5% had children under the age of 18 living with them, 50.4% were married couples living together, 10.1% had a female householder with no husband present, and 34.6% were non-families. 30.9% of all households were made up of individuals, and 13.9% had someone living alone who was 65 years of age or older. The average household size was 2.49 and the average family size was 3.14.

In the city, the population was spread out, with 28.4% under the age of 18, 7.7% from 18 to 24, 28.4% from 25 to 44, 19.5% from 45 to 64, and 16.0% who were 65 years of age or older. The median age was 36 years. For every 100 females, there were 94.3 males. For every 100 females age 18 and over, there were 92.3 males.

As of 2000 the median income for a household in the city was $36,949, and the median income for a family was $47,596. Males had a median income of $35,847 versus $24,792 for females. The per capita income for the city was $17,508. About 7.7% of families and 11.3% of the population were below the poverty line, including 14.1% of those under age 18 and 13.2% of those age 65 or over.

== Education ==
Valley operates one school district, Douglas County West Community Schools. Douglas County West (DC West) was formed in August 2005 by the merger of Waterloo Public Schools and Valley Public Schools. DC West provides an extensive education from pre-school through the 12th grade. DC West Community Schools, as it is commonly called, used to have two campuses in which the high school and middle school were separate. The main campus is now located at 401 S. Pine Street in Valley. Prior to becoming DC West, the school was Valley High School, home of the Valley Terriers.

== See also ==
- List of municipalities in Nebraska
- First Nebraska Bank
