= Brian Hardin =

American politician

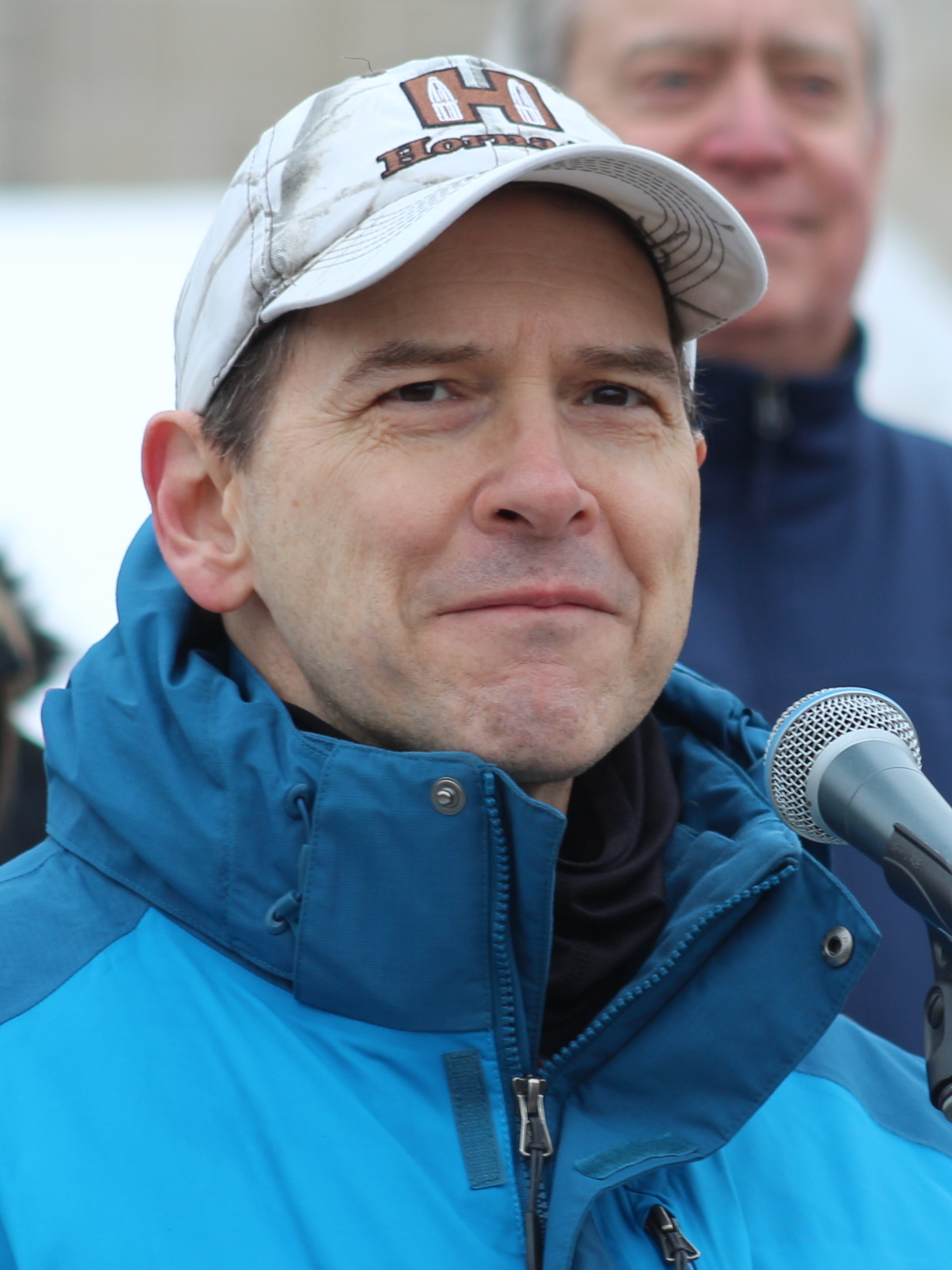

Member of the Nebraska Legislature from the 48th district
- Incumbent
- Assumed office January 4, 2023
- Preceded by: John Stinner

Personal details
- Born: December 21, 1965 (age 60) Scottsbluff, Nebraska, U.S.
- Party: Republican
- Spouse: Lili Hardin
- Children: 2
- Education: Chadron State College; Denver Seminary (MDiv)
- Occupation: Farmer, rancher, pastor, insurance broker, business consultant, CEO
- Profession: Insurance

Brian Hardin (born December 21, 1965) is a member of the Nebraska Legislature for District 48 from Gering, Nebraska. He was elected to the Nebraska Legislature on November 8, 2022. Hardin will appear on the May 2026 Primary Ballot as the incumbent for District 48.

== Personal life ==
Hardin was born on December 21, 1965, in Scottsbluff, Nebraska. He graduated from Gering High School in 1984. He earned a B.A. from Chadron State College. He also attended Denver Seminary and received a Master of Divinity in 1992.

As of 2026, he is the CEO of ARG Advisors Ltd. In the past, Hardin has worked as a farmer, a pastor, an insurance broker and a business consultant.

Hardin is married with two children. He is a member of the Calvary Memorial Church in Scotts Bluff County and the Republican Party (United States).

== Nebraska Legislature ==
Hardin was elected to the Nebraska Legislature in the 48th district as a de facto republican against farmer Don L. Lease II, receiving 52% of the vote to Lease's 47%. Hardin was sworn in on January 4, 2023.

As of 2026, Hardin serves as a member of the Banking, Commerce and Insurance, Health and Human Services, and Nebraska Retirement Systems Committees. He also serves as a member on the Legislative Oversight Committee.

District 48 of Nebraska's Legislative District includes counties Scotts Bluff County, Banner County, and Kimball County.

=== Abortion ===
Hardin is pro-life and "respects life from conception".

=== First Amendment ===
He supports the first amendment and wants to "Grow the freedom of religion and shrink the freedom from religion".

=== Gun rights ===
He supports the second amendment.

=== Worker's rights ===
Hardin has pro-business political positions. He believes in shrinking work regulations.

=== Education ===
In regards to K-12 education, Hardin believes in shrinking government influence and teacher's unions influence in education. He also wants to establish "moral training based on principles established by God" for teachers. In addition, he wants to "shrink indoctrination of Critical Race Theory – overt or veiled, as well as gender-bending studies which divide instead of unite."

== Electoral history ==
Nebraska's 48th Legislative District Election, 2022
Primary election
Party	Candidate	Votes	%
Republican	Brian Hardin	2,638	45.17
Republican	Don L. Lease II	1,366	23.39
Republican	Scott Shaver	1,314	22.50
Republican	Jeremiah Jake Teeple	291	4.98
Republican	Talon Cordle	231	3.96
Total votes		5,840	100.00
General election
Republican	Brian Hardin	5,526	52.15
Republican	Don L. Lease II	5,071	47.85
Total votes		10,597	100.00
Republican hold			
