= Ashland Gazette =

American weekly newspaper in Nebraska

- Type: Weekly newspaper
- Owner: Lee Enterprises
- Founder: J. F. Ritchhart
- Publisher: Midlands Newspapers Inc.
- Editor: Lisa Brichacek
- Founded: 1878
- Headquarters: 564 N. Broadway, Wahoo, Nebraska United States
- Circulation: 581
- OCLC number: 30909595
- Website: wahoo-ashland-waverly.com/community/ashland/

The Ashland Gazette is a weekly newspaper serving Ashland, Nebraska and surrounding communities of Saunders County, Nebraska.

The paper is part of Midlands Newspapers, Inc., which is a subsidiary of Omaha World-Herald, which was owned by Berkshire Hathaway Inc. As of 2020, the newspaper is owned by Lee Enterprises.

== History ==
The paper was established as the Saunders County Reporter in 1878 by J.F. Ritchhart. In 1881, it was purchased by T.J. Pickett, Jr. and renamed to Ashland Gazette. The Ashland Gazette is considered the oldest newspaper and oldest business in Saunders County, Nebraska.

Pickett Jr. sold the paper to William Becker around 1892 and went on to purchase the Wahoo Wasp. William Becker published the Ashland Gazette until 1911 when he sold the paper to F.L. Carroll.

Glen Howard purchased the paper in 1914 and he installed a new linotype machine and modern printing equipment. Howard worked on the paper until his death in 1934. Mr. and Mrs. J.R. Ziegenbein published the paper from 1932 to 1945; Mrs. J.R. Ziegenbein was Glen Howard's daughter. During that time, they also owned the Gretna Breeze. Ziegenbein was a member of the committee that established the College World Series in 1949.

M.C. Howe owned and edited the paper from 1945-1955.

In 1955, the Ashland Gazette was sold to Arthur J. Riedesel. Riedesel served as president of the Nebraska Press Association in 1979. Riedesel published the Gazette for 30 years, until his retirement in 1985. The paper was sold to Zean and Marilyn Carney.

Ashland Gazette became part of Arbor Printing Co., a company owned by the Carneys and that also included The Waverly News, the Wahoo Newspaper, and the David City Banner Press. Zean Carney served a term as president of the Nebraska Press Association in 1999.

On May 1, 2004, the Carneys sold the Ashland Gazette to Midlands Newspapers, Inc., which is a subsidiary of Omaha World-Herald. The Carneys went on to establish and fund The Outstanding Young Nebraska Journalist Award, given every year by the Nebraska Press Association. In 2011, Zean Carney received the highest honor bestowed by the Nebraska Press Association: the Master Editor-Publisher Award.
