= Gibbon Reporter =

Newspaper in Nebraska

- Type: Weekly newspaper
- Format: Broadsheet
- Owner(s): Clipper Publishing, Inc.
- Publisher: Steve Glenn
- Founded: 1890
- Ceased publication: 2017, merged into Shelton Clipper
- Headquarters: Shelton Clipper: P.O. Box 640, Shelton, Nebraska, United States
- OCLC number: 32034773

The Gibbon Reporter was a newspaper serving Gibbon, Nebraska and surrounding communities of Buffalo County, Nebraska.

In 2017, the paper was merged into the Shelton Clipper, along with the Wood River Sunbeam.

== History ==
The paper was founded in 1890 as The Gibbon Reporter, part of the Farmers' Alliance Advocate, by W.H. Carson. The paper initially had a populist leaning, as Carson was a leader in local populist politics. The paper later became nonpartisan in 1899. In 1897, the Gibbon Reporter was at the center of local controversy when it was named the paper of record for Buffalo County despite being, according to the Kearney Daily Hub, an "obscure little sheet" with a smaller circulation and higher cost than other local papers.

The paper was purchased in 1901 by Romain A. St. John, who ran the paper until 1915. St. John sold the paper to Walter B. Rodgers in 1915. Clarence E. Johnson owned the paper from 1919 to 1937; he retired in 1937 due to poor health and passed away five years later. Johnson sold the paper to Laverne T. McMullen, who was an employee at the paper. McMullen owned and published the paper for 34 years.

McMullen sold it to Doug Duncan, publisher of the Shelton Clipper in 1972. Duncan would publish the paper for 26 years, serve as president of the Nebraska Press Association, and become the youngest person to ever to win the Master Editor-Publisher Award, the highest honor of the state press association. In 1989, Duncan became President of Papillion Times Printing Company, which also owned the Gretna Breeze and other Nebraska newspapers. He died in 1994 of lung cancer. In 2017, the publisher of the Gibbon Reporter, Wood River Sunbeam, and Shelton Clipper decided to merge all three papers into one, under the title of Shelton Clipper.
