= Martin Mischke =

American politician (1909–1993)

Member of the Nebraska Legislature from the 14th district
- In office January 3, 1939 – January 2, 1945
- Preceded by: John D. Reynolds
- Succeeded by: Dwight Burney

Personal details
- Born: October 21, 1909 Crofton, Nebraska
- Died: September 4, 1993 (aged 83) Kearney, Nebraska
- Party: Republican
- Spouse: Norma Vryheid (m. 1943)
- Children: 3
- Education: Yankton College (B.A.)
- Occupation: Rancher, publisher

Martin Julius Mischke (October 21, 1909 – September 4, 1993) was a Republican politician from Nebraska who served as a member of the Nebraska Legislature from the 14th district from 1939 to 1945.

== Early life ==
Mischke was born in Crofton, Nebraska, in 1909, and attended grade school in Crofton. He graduated from Yankton College with his bachelor's degree in 1934, and operated the Mischke Hereford Ranch with his brothers. Mischke later worked for the Curtis Publishing Company.

== Nebraska Legislature ==
In 1938, Mischke ran for the Nebraska Legislature from the 15th district, which consisted of Cedar and Knox counties, challenging incumbent State Senator John D. Reynolds for re-election. Mischke narrowly placed second in the primary, receiving 24 percent of the vote, and advanced to the general election with Reynolds, who placed first with 36 percent. In the general election, Mischke defeated Reynolds, winning 53 percent of the vote to his 47 percent.

Mischke ran for re-election in 1940, and was challenged by former Knox County Attorney Arthur Burbridge, Fred Hoesing, and Martin Nelson. Mischke placed first in the primary, receiving 44 percent of the vote, and faced Burbridge, who received 27 percent of the vote, in the general election. Mischke defeated Burbridge in the general election with 57 percent of the vote.

In 1940, Mischke was unopposed for re-election. He faced no opponent in 1944, but Dwight Burney, a livestock feeder, challenged him as a write-in candidate. Burney did not receive enough votes in the primary election to win a listing on the general election ballot, but his supporters gathered petitions to put him on the general election ballot, and he narrowly defeated Mischke by 83 votes, winning 50.4 percent of the vote.

== Post-legislative career ==
In 1970, after moving to Kearney, Mischke ran for the Buffalo County Board of Supervisors from the 5th district. He defeated incumbent Supervisor Dean Cannon in the Republican primary and was unopposed in the general election. Mischke was re-elected in 1974 and 1978, and was defeated in the Republican primary in 1982.

== Death ==
Mischke died on September 4, 1993.
