= Pilot-Tribune & Enterprise =

- Type: Weekly newspaper
- Owner: Carpenter Media Group
- Publisher: Pilot-tribune Company
- Editor: Kevin Bumgarner
- Associate editor: Adam Branting
- Photo editor: Joe Burns
- Founded: 1929
- Headquarters: Blair, Nebraska
- Circulation: 2,839
- Website: enterprisepub.com

The Pilot-Tribune & Enterprise is a local weekly newspaper from Blair, Nebraska.

== History ==
The paper has roots back to its founding in 1929, when it was formed by the union of local papers the Blair Pilot and the Tribune. In 2025, Enterprise Media Group of Blair, owned by Mark Rhoades, sold the paper to Carpenter Media Group.

== See also ==
- List of newspapers in Nebraska
