= J. P. O'Furey =

American politician (1876–1937)

Member of the Nebraska State Senate from the 10th district
- In office January 3, 1933 – January 1, 1935
- Preceded by: George G. Koster
- Succeeded by: John D. Reynolds

Personal details
- Born: June 1, 1876 Wheatland, Pennsylvania
- Died: August 16, 1937 (aged 61) Yankton, South Dakota
- Party: Democratic
- Spouse: Lula Mae Price (m. 1904)
- Occupation: Journalist, newspaper publisher

Joseph P. O'Furey (June 1, 1876 – August 16, 1937) was a Democratic politician and newspaper publisher from Nebraska who served in the Nebraska State Senate from the 10th district from 1933 to 1935.

O'Furey was born in Wheatland, Pennsylvania, in 1876. He had little formal education, but worked as a journalist in Iowa and Ohio before moving to Nebraska in 1915 to become the publisher of the Cedar County News. O'Furey served as president of the Nebraska Press Association and was active in the Nebraska Democratic Party, and was a delegate to the 1924 Democratic National Convention.

In 1932, O'Furey was elected to the Nebraska State Senate from the 10th district, defeating Republican Joseph Schneider with 55 percent of the vote. He ran for re-election in 1934, and was defeated by Republican nominee John D. Reynolds, who won 59 percent of the vote to O'Furey's 41 percent.

O'Furey died on August 16, 1937.
