= John Harms (Nebraska politician) =

American politician

Member of the Nebraska Legislature from the 48th district
- In office 2007–2015
- Preceded by: Adrian Smith
- Succeeded by: John Stinner

Personal details
- Born: February 17, 1940 (age 86) Bayard, Nebraska
- Party: non-partisan
- Education: Chadron State College

John N. Harms (born February 17, 1940) is a politician from the U.S. state of Nebraska. He served two terms in the Nebraska Legislature from 2007 to 2015. Harms is a former president of Western Nebraska Community College.

Harms graduated from Morrill High School in 1958. He earned a bachelor's degree and a master of science degree in secondary education from Chadron State College and an Ed.D. in higher educational administration from Montana State University. He began his professional career as a high school teacher in Gering, Nebraska and served in a variety of educational positions culminating with the presidency of Western Nebraska Community College, a position he attained in 1976.

In 2006, Harms retired from the college to run for the state legislature. He defeated Gering dentist George Schlothauer, winning 58% of the vote to Schlothauer's 42%.

Harms ran unopposed for re-election to his legislative seat in 2010.

Due to Nebraska's term-limits law, Harms was ineligible to run for a third consecutive term in 2014. He was succeeded by John Stinner.
