= Gering Courier =

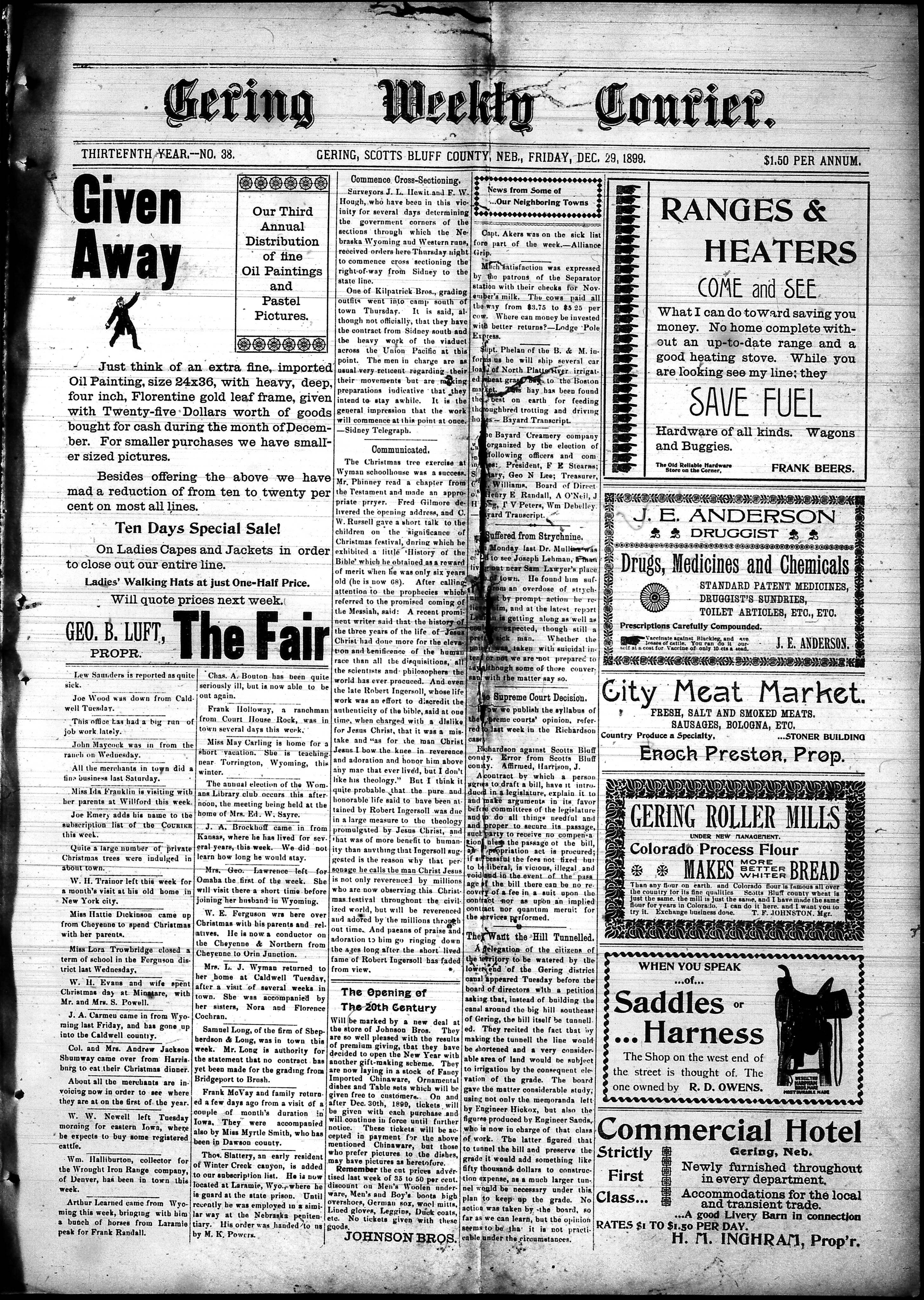
- Front page of December 29, 1899, issue
- Type: Weekly newspaper
- Format: Broadsheet
- Owner: Lee Enterprises
- Founder: A.B. Wood
- Editor: Rich Macke
- Founded: April 27, 1887
- Ceased publication: December 5, 2024
- Headquarters: 1405 Broadway, Scottsbluff, Nebraska
- Circulation: 321
- OCLC number: 32034477
- Website: starherald.com/news/community/gering

The Gering Courier was a weekly newspaper serving the Gering, Nebraska community from 1887 to 2024. It was printed in Gering's sister city of Scottsbluff. The Courier shared resources with two other nearby newspapers, the Star-Herald and the Hemingford Ledger, both also owned by Lee Enterprises.

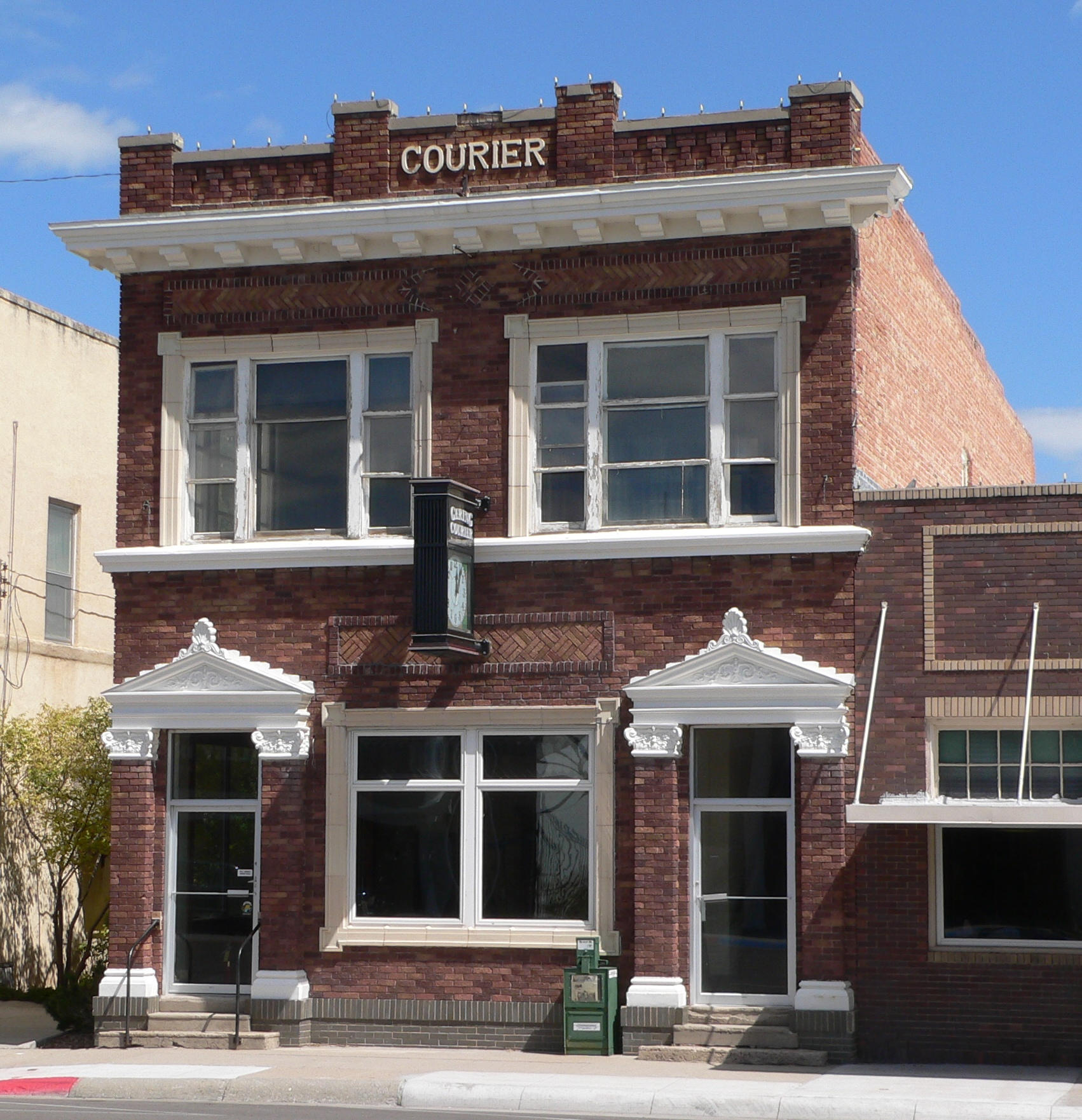
The Gering Courier building, which housed the paper from 1915 through the 2000s. Now vacant, it is on the National Register of Historic Places.

== History ==
Established by Asa Wood in 1887 as a Republican-leaning weekly, the Gering Courier was the first paper in Gering.

By the mid-1910s, it had a good reputation, with the Alliance Herald calling it one of the best papers in the West. In 1915, it moved into the new Gering Courier Building, a structure now on the National Register of Historic Places. In 1927, it absorbed competing paper the Gering Midwest.

For over fifty years, Wood was publisher and editor. A one-time president of the Nebraska Press Association, he was also a breeder of cattle, a state senator from 1924 to 1930, and, like many publishers of that time, the local postmaster. Described as a "walking encyclopedia" of western Nebraska history, he was one of the best known newspapermen in the state. He left the paper to his son, Warren Wood, on his death in 1945.

Under the younger Wood, the paper continued to expand, buying out Banner County's Banner News in 1955. Following the death of Warren Wood in 1978, Wood's daughter Carol became publisher of the Courier and her husband Jack Lewis oversaw the paper's general operations.

=== Ownership transitions away from the Wood Family ===
In April 1999, Carol and Jack Lewis sold the Courier to Robert Van Vleet's Excellence in Publishing, Inc., which owned the Sidney Daily Sun in nearby Sidney, Nebraska. The Courier was then sold by Van Vleet to the Omaha World-Herald Company in February 2000 as part of a deal where the World-Herald Company turned over ownership of the Sidney Telegraph to Van Vleet (and the Daily Sun and Telegraph were consolidated into The Sidney Sun-Telegraph). The Omaha World-Herald Company, whose holdings included the Courier, was in turn purchased by Berkshire Hathaway in 2011.

The Courier was part of Berkshire Hathaway's subsidiary BH Media Group, although starting in 2018 it was managed by Lee Enterprises. In January 2020 it was announced that Lee Enterprises was purchasing Berkshire Hathaway's newspaper holdings. The Courier published its final edition on December 5, 2024.

== Accolades ==
The Courier has won top honors in the Nebraska Press Association's Better Newspapers contest, including the Loral Johnson award in 2006.
