= Scottsbluff Republican =

Newspaper published in Scottsbluff, Nebraska from 1900 to 1964

- Type: Weekly newspaper
- Format: Broadsheet
- Founder(s): Eugene T. Westervelt
- Founded: 1900
- Ceased publication: 1964
- Headquarters: Scottsbluff, Scotts Bluff County, Nebraska

The Scottsbluff Republican was a newspaper which served the city of Scottsbluff and surrounding areas in Nebraska, United States from 1900 to 1964.

== History ==
The newspaper was founded as the Scotts Bluff Republican in 1900 by Eugene T. Westervelt. It was Scottsbluff's first newspaper and was located in one of the earliest constructed buildings in the city. The first issue appeared on May 4, 1900 and the paper was originally published weekly. It was later changed to a semi-weekly paper, but eventually returned to weekly publication. Its main competitor was the Star-Herald.

Silent film star Jacqueline Logan briefly worked as a journalist for the paper.

In 1945 the paper closed its own print shop and was instead printed by the Minatare Free Press newspaper (in nearby Minatare), although Westervelt continued as editor. Following the death of Westervelt in 1950, his son, John M. "Kim" Westervelt, became editor. By late 1964, circulation of both the Minatare Free Press and Scottsbluff Republican was so low that the papers were no longer profitable and it was decided to end their publication. The final issue of the Scottsbluff Republican was dated November 19, 1964.
