= Western Nebraska Observer =

Weekly newspaper published in Kimball, Nebraska

Coordinates: 41.23693075240082°N 103.6618517015739°W

- Type: Weekly newspaper
- Owner(s): Gary and Sue Stevenson
- Founder(s): Charles H. Randall
- Founded: May 1, 1885
- Headquarters: 118 E. 2nd Street, Kimball, Nebraska, U.S.
- Website: westernnebraskaobserver.net

The Western Nebraska Observer is a weekly newspaper covering Kimball, Nebraska and surrounding Banner County. It has a circulation of 892 copies and is currently owned by Gary and Sue Stevenson. The newspaper is the town's oldest continuously owned business.

== History ==
Founded May 1, 1885 by Charles H. Randall, it was the first paper in Kimball, founded when the town, then called Antelopeville, had only four buildings. The first issue was cranked out on Randall's old army hand press. Originally dubbed the Nebraska Observer, the name was changed to the Kimball Observer after the town's name was changed from Antelopeville to Kimball. In the late 1800s it passed through a series of owners, including A. B. Beard, G. L. Carlyle, R. D. Wilson, and V. B. Cargill. While the paper's name would change several times throughout the 20th century, the paper was first called the Western Nebraska Observer in 1886.

The paper moved from hand press to linotype machine in November 1915, and to offset printing in 1964.

Robert J Pinkerton, publisher of the paper, starting in December 1962, was elected president of the Nebraska Press Association in 1972. He had worked at the paper as an editor from 1958 forward, and was a 1954 graduate of the University of Nebraska School of Journalism. In 1995, while still publishing the paper, he was named master editor-publisher by the Nebraska Press Association, the highest honor awarded by that organization.
