= Star-Herald =

Newspaper serving Scottsbluff, Nebraska, U.S.

Star Herald
- Type: Daily newspaper
- Format: Broadsheet
- Owner: Lee Enterprises
- Editor: Joan von Kampen, western Nebraska editor; Maunette Loeks, deputy editor
- Founded: 1912
- Headquarters: 1405 Broadway Scottsbluff, Scotts Bluff County, NE 69361
- Circulation: 5,690 Daily (as of 2023)
- Website: starherald.com

The Star Herald, or the Scottsbluff Star Herald, is a newspaper serving the city of Scottsbluff and surrounding areas in Nebraska, United States. The paper is published on Tuesday, Thursday, and Saturday.

== History ==
The Star Herald originated as two separate newspapers. In 1900, Ernest Moon established the Scottsbluff Herald in Scottsbluff. In 1906 the Mitchell Star was founded by P. J. Barron in nearby Mitchell. In 1907 the Star's publication was moved to Scottsbluff and the paper was renamed the Scottsbluff Star. In 1912, Asa B. Wood, owner of the Gering Courier, and Harry J. Wisner purchased both the Herald and Star and consolidated them into a single newspaper under the title of the Star-Herald. The paper's main competitor was the Scottsbluff Republican.

The Wood family continued to own a half stake in the newspaper until 1966. In November 1968 the heirs of Harry Wisner sold their stock in the newspaper to the Seacrest Family's Western Publishing Co. The Seacrest family also owned the Lincoln Journal and North Platte Telegraph. The Western Publishing Co., including the Star-Herald, was acquired by the Omaha World-Herald Company in February 2000. The Omaha World-Herald Company was in turn purchased by Berkshire Hathaway in 2011.

The Star Herald was part of Berkshire Hathaway's subsidiary BH Media Group, although starting in 2018 it was managed by Lee Enterprises. In January 2020 it was announced that Lee Enterprises was purchasing Berkshire Hathaway's newspaper holdings.

On June 13, 2023, the Star Herald reduced its number of print days a week from six (formerly excluding Monday) to three. The newspaper also transitioned from being delivered by a traditional newspaper delivery carrier to mail delivery by the United States Postal Service. Production of the print edition would be moving to Rapid City, South Dakota.

The paper shared resources with two other nearby newspapers, the Gering Courier and the Hemingford Ledger, both also owned by Lee Enterprises, until the two ceased in December 2024.
