= The Nebraska Signal =

- Type: Weekly newspaper
- Owner(s): Tim Curran
- Founded: 1881
- Headquarters: 131 N 9th Geneva, NE
- Circulation: 1,886
- Website: thenebraskasignal.com

The Nebraska Signal is an American weekly newspaper serving Geneva, Nebraska and surrounding Fillmore County, published on Wednesdays.

== History ==
Founded in Fairmont, Nebraska 1881, by J. B. Brazelton and William Putney, the Signal quickly built a reputation as one of the strongest and most widely circulated weeklies in the state. Putney, formerly of the Lincoln Globe, saw success as editor, and by 1886 the paper was upgrading its printing press to a new Potter unit. Later that year, Putney died suddenly, at the age of 41.

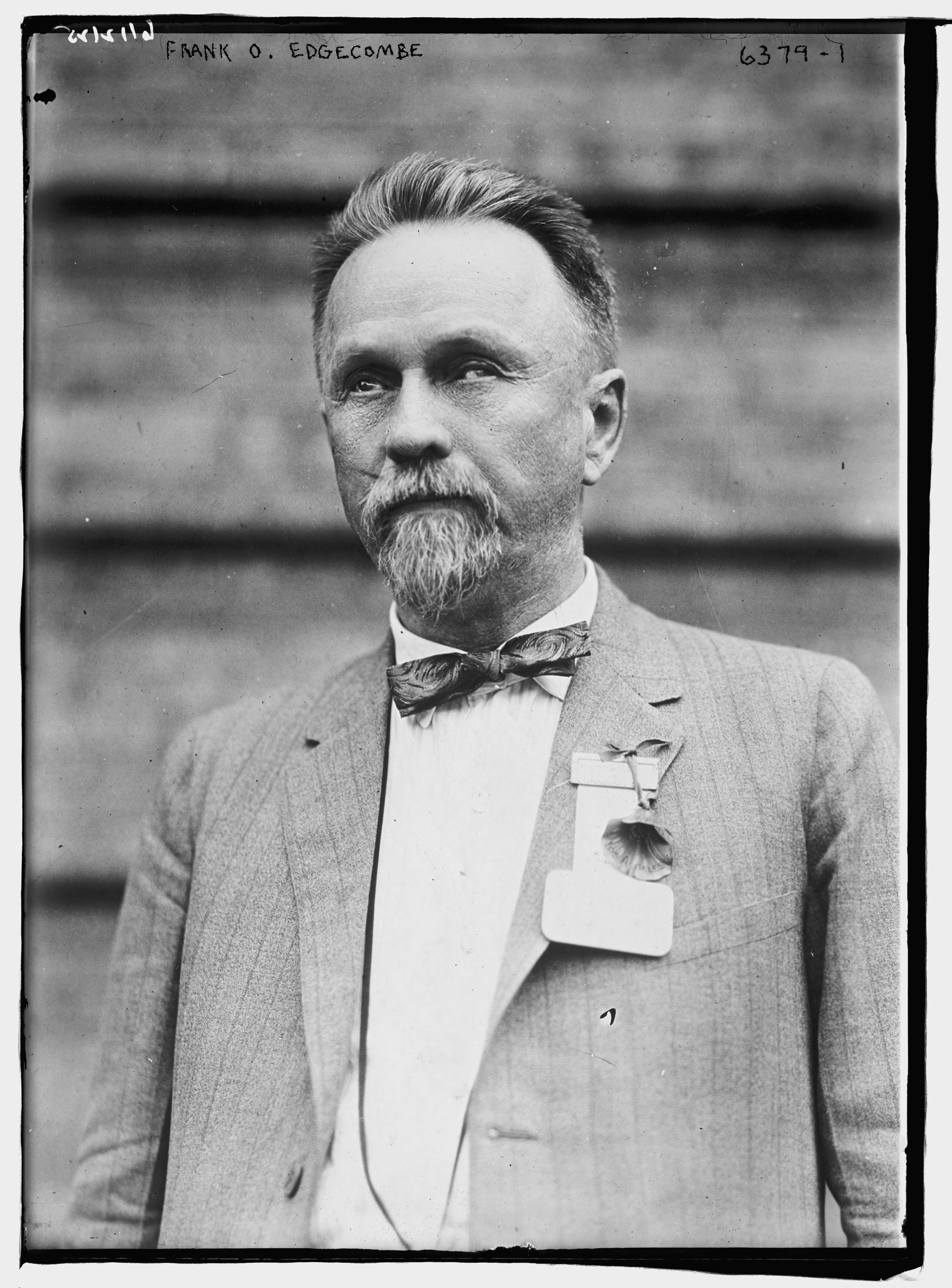
Frank O. Edgecombe in 1925

In the late 1890s, Frank Edgecombe, a former banker, purchased the Signal and three other Fillmore County publications, consolidating them under the Signal name and moving operations to Geneva. Edgecombe had been the editor and publisher of the Falls City Journal in 1892 when a hunting accident rendered him completely blind. Undeterred by the accident, he developed a system of dictation to a hired stenographer that allowed him to continue to as editor. The success of the Journal allowed him to expand operations and consolidate under the Geneva Signal name. The resulting paper became the most widely circulated of any country paper in the state.

The Signal has remained a family affair, with the fifth generation of Edgecombes taking over the paper in May 2018. It is the oldest continuous business in Fillmore County.
