= Elgin Review =

Newspaper in Nebraska, US

- Type: Weekly newspaper
- Owner(s): Dennis and Lynell Morgan
- Founded: 1897
- Language: English
- Headquarters: PO Box 359, Elgin, Nebraska, United States
- Circulation: 886
- OCLC number: 33224077
- Website: elginreview.com

Elgin Review is a weekly newspaper serving Elgin, Nebraska and surrounding counties of Antelope, Boone, and Wheeler. The paper is owned by Dennis and Lynell Morgan and its circulation is estimated at 886 copies.

== History ==
The Elgin Review was first published on January 1, 1897 by Mr. McCord and Ernest S. Scofield as a weekly non-partisan publication. Scofield fully took over the paper later in 1897. Records of the Review before 1906 are somewhat unclear, since no files of the paper were kept before that year.

Benjamin W. McKeen purchased the paper in 1903. Charles H. Stockdale purchased the paper on February 1, 1908. During the 15 years of Stockdale's ownership, the subscription list and influence of the Review was expanded. There was also various improvements in the plant and equipment. In May 1916, work began on the present brick building that houses the Review. A short time later, the first linotype typesetting machine was installed at the newspaper. This machine did away with much of the arduous "hand setting" of type, improved the appearance of the newspaper and allowed Stockdale to provide better service to printing customers. Also under Stockdale's ownership, a cylinder press and folding machine were added to the operation, further streamlining production of the newspaper.

A.C. Gardner moved to Elgin from Albion to take over ownership of the Review on December 1, 1922. He operated the paper through most of the Dirty Thirties and sold it on December 1, 1936, to Frederick Valdemar Erastus Peterson. Peterson, who was Superintendent of Elgin Public Schools at the time, had served as a contributing editor of the paper for several years. He was Governor of Nebraska from 1947 until 1953.

Peterson published the paper between 1936 and 1946. He became more involved in politics in 1939, serving as the campaign manager for Hugh A. Butler, who was running for Congress. He also served as secretary for Governor Dwight Griswold until 1942, when he left to serve two years in the air service command of the army. Peterson sold the paper in 1946 to run for and become Governor of Nebraska. Val Peterson sold the Review to his brother, Fred, on December 1, 1946, and Fred operated the business until October 13, 1947, when he sold to George F. and Leona Voorhies. The Voorhies had the longest tenure at the helm of the Review, operating the paper for 31 years.

On January 1, 1978, the paper was passed to Jim E. and Julianne K. Dickerson. Operations and printing methods changed greatly during the newspaper's history. One of the biggest changes came when the paper was converted from letterpress to offset production in the early 1970s. The Review was printed each week at Neligh News and Leader central plant, but most other production chores and commercial printing were done in Elgin. The Dickersons added to and updated much of the equipment at the Review. During the 11 years, they installed new typesetting equipment, a complete darkroom system with process camera and a business computer. The front of the building was replaced in November, 1980. Jim Dickerson served as president of the Nebraska Press Association in 1998. On April 1, 2007 the paper was purchased by Dennis and Lynell Morgan. After the sale, the Morgans updated the paper's design and equipment. Dennis Morgan served two terms as president of the Nebraska Press Association, in 2014 and 2015.
