= Alliance Times-Herald =

- Type: Weekly newspaper
- Founded: 1887
- Headquarters: 114 East Fourth Street Alliance, NE 69301
- City: Alliance, Nebraska
- Country: United States
- Circulation: 1,438
- Website: alliancetimes.com

The Alliance Times-Herald is a weekly newspaper published in Alliance, Nebraska.

== History ==
The newspaper has been published since 1887. Ben J. Sallows published the newspaper from at least 1930 until 1949, when the paper was sold to Fred A. Seaton.

The paper commenced daily publication in 1950, becoming its community's only daily news source. Former publisher Gene Kemper died in 1971. Fred Kuhlman became the paper's publisher in 1988 and served in that role until at least 2000.
