= Bayard, Nebraska =

- City
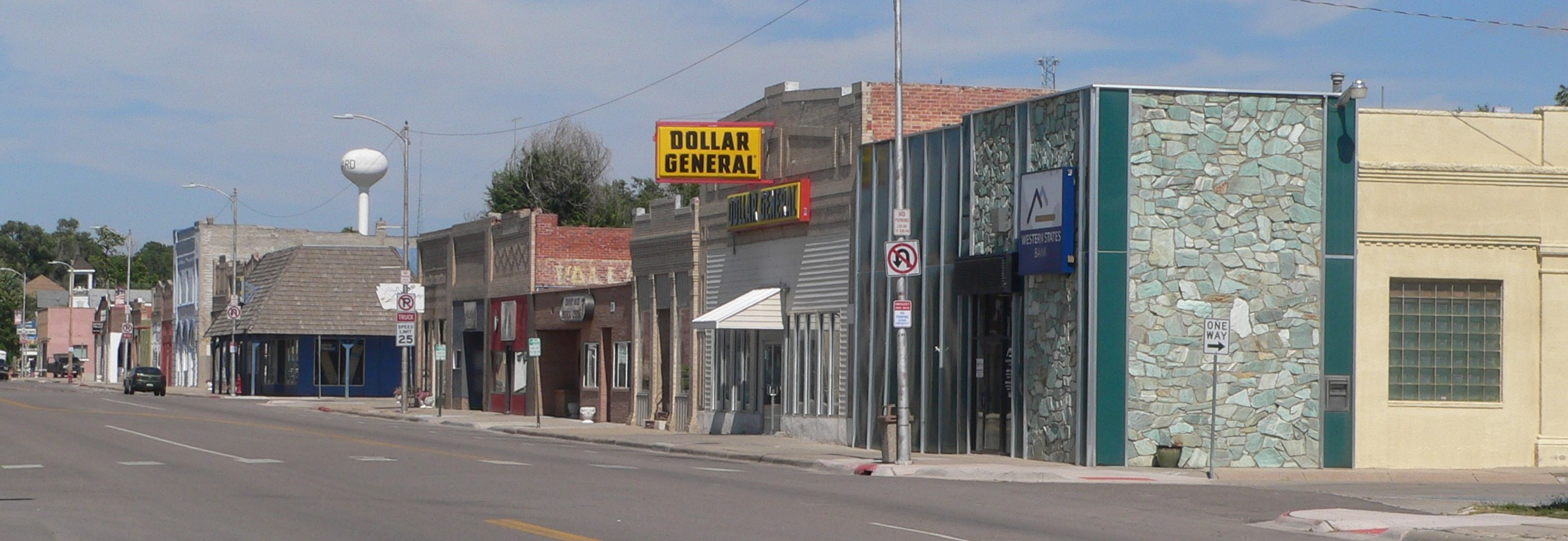
- Main Street

- Location in Morrill County and the state of Nebraska

- Location within Nebraska Location within the United States Location within North America
- Coordinates: 41°45′26″N 103°19′23″W
- Country: United States
- State: Nebraska
- County: Morrill

Area
  - Total: 0.69 sq mi (1.80 km^{2})
  - Land: 0.69 sq mi (1.80 km^{2})
  - Water: 0 sq mi (0.00 km^{2})
- Elevation: 3,763 ft (1,147 m)

Population (2020)
  - Total: 1,140
  - Density: 1,639.7/sq mi (633.09/km^{2})
- Time zone: UTC-7 (Mountain (MST))
  - Summer (DST): UTC-6 (MDT)
- ZIP code: 69334
- Area code: 308
- FIPS code: 31-03285
- GNIS feature ID: 2394089
- Website: www.cityofbayard.net

Bayard is a city in Morrill County, Nebraska, United States. The population was 1,140 at the 2020 census. Bayard is located 2 miles north of Chimney Rock, one of the most famous rock formations in North America, due to its historical prominence.

== History ==
"Old" Bayard was founded in the 1880s. It was named after the city of Bayard, Iowa. The first post office at Bayard was established in 1888.

The town of Bayard was picked up and moved to its present site in 1900 in order to be on the new Chicago, Burlington and Quincy Railroad line.

CCC Camp BR-61, part of the North Platte Project, was located at Bayard.

== Geography ==
Bayard is in western Morrill County, less than 2 miles (3 km) north of the North Platte River. U.S. Route 26 runs north-south through the city as Main Street; the highway leads northwest 23 miles (37 km) to Scottsbluff and southeast 15 miles (24 km) to Bridgeport, the Morrill county seat.

According to the U.S. Census Bureau, the city of Bayard has a total area of 0.70 square miles (1.81 km^{2}), all land.

== Demographics ==
Historical population
Census	Pop.	Note	%±
1910	261		—
1920	2,127		714.9%
1930	1,559		−26.7%
1940	2,121		36.0%
1950	1,869		−11.9%
1960	1,519		−18.7%
1970	1,338		−11.9%
1980	1,435		7.2%
1990	1,196		−16.7%
2000	1,247		4.3%
2010	1,209		−3.0%
2020	1,140		−5.7%
U.S. Decennial Census

=== 2010 census ===
As of the census of 2010, there were 1,209 people, 484 households, and 315 families living in the city. The population density was 1,727.1 inhabitants per square mile (666.8/km^{2}). There were 557 housing units at an average density of 795.7 per square mile (307.2/km^{2}). The racial makeup of the city was 90.3% White, 0.2% African American, 1.1% Native American, 0.3% Asian, 5.7% from other races, and 2.3% from two or more races. Hispanic or Latino of any race were 16.8% of the population.

There were 484 households, of which 33.3% had children under the age of 18 living with them, 51.0% were married couples living together, 9.1% had a female householder with no husband present, 5.0% had a male householder with no wife present, and 34.9% were non-families. 31.4% of all households were made up of individuals, and 16.1% had someone living alone who was 65 years of age or older. The average household size was 2.40 and the average family size was 3.03.

The median age in the city was 40.3 years. 25.9% of residents were under the age of 18; 6.3% were between the ages of 18 and 24; 23.6% were from 25 to 44; 24.6% were from 45 to 64; and 19.7% were 65 years of age or older. The gender makeup of the city was 49.5% male and 50.5% female.

=== 2000 census ===
As of the census of 2000, there were 1,247 people, 497 households, and 329 families living in the city. The population density was 1,788.0 inhabitants per square mile (690.4/km^{2}). There were 572 housing units at an average density of 820.2 per square mile (316.7/km^{2}). The racial makeup of the city was 90.86% White, 0.08% African American, 0.88% Native American, 0.16% Asian, 6.74% from other races, and 1.28% from two or more races. Hispanic or Latino of any race were 15.88% of the population.

There were 497 households, out of which 31.8% had children under the age of 18 living with them, 52.9% were married couples living together, 8.7% had a female householder with no husband present, and 33.8% were non-families. 31.2% of all households were made up of individuals, and 18.9% had someone living alone who was 65 years of age or older. The average household size was 2.41 and the average family size was 2.99.

In the city, the population was spread out, with 26.2% under the age of 18, 8.0% from 18 to 24, 22.4% from 25 to 44, 23.0% from 45 to 64, and 20.4% who were 65 years of age or older. The median age was 40 years. For every 100 females, there were 91.6 males. For every 100 females age 18 and over, there were 85.1 males.

As of 2000 the median income for a household in the city was $30,500, and the median income for a family was $39,559. Males had a median income of $32,368 versus $19,167 for females. The per capita income for the city was $14,677. About 10.9% of families and 15.1% of the population were below the poverty line, including 18.1% of those under age 18 and 13.9% of those age 65 or over.

== Notable people ==
- John Harms, Nebraska legislator
