= Cedar County News =

- Type: Weekly newspaper
- Owner: Northeast Nebraska News
- Editor: Rob Dump & Peggy Year
- Founded: January 1898
- Headquarters: 102 W Main St., Hartington, Nebraska, United States
- Circulation: 1,483
- OCLC number: 33396536
- Website: hartington.net

Cedar County News is an American weekly newspaper serving Hartington, Nebraska and surrounding communities of Cedar County, Nebraska. It is published on Wednesdays and has an estimated circulation of 1,483.

The Cedar County News is owned by Northeast Nebraska News and published and edited by Rob Dump and Peggy Year.

== History ==
The Cedar County News was founded on January 13, 1898 by Z.M. Baird. In 1900, the paper was purchased by A.V. Parker. The paper was later owned by Frank Kelley and his son George, who sold the paper in 1914.

J. P. O'Furey purchased the Cedar County News in 1915 and he became president of the Nebraska Press Association in 1922. In 1924, the paper received third place in a national community service contest by the National Editorial Association. The News won the statewide award for best newspaper in 1925, and the national award for best community newspaper in 1929.

In 1934, while still under O'Furey, the News absorbed two local papers, the Wynot Tribune and the Obert Times. O'Furey continued to publish the paper until his death in 1937. O'Furey was posthumously inducted into the Nebraska Newspaper Hall of Fame in 2016. O'Furey's wife, L.M. O'Furey, continued owning and publishing the paper until 1940, when she sold the paper to Fred Zimmer. Zimmer became president of Nebraska Press Association in 1950. Zimmer sold the paper in 1963 to Jack Lough, and later in 1965 died unexpectedly.

Lough, who also owned the Albion News, sold Cedar County News in 1973 to Mr. and Mrs. Donald L. Johnson. The Johnsons sold the paper to James C. Kelly and son Thomas Kelly in 1979.

Rob Dump and Peggy Year purchased the Cedar County News in 1992. They bought three additional papers in 1996: the Laurel Advocate, the Randolph Times and the Osmond Republican. They later purchased the Coleridge Blade and the Wausa Gazette, forming a group of newspapers known as Northeast Nebraska News.

In 2017, Peggy Year became president of the Nebraska Press Association. During that time, she and Rob launched NewsFirst, an app/widget that aggregates news stories from across 16 Nebraska newspapers. In 2023, Rob Dump was elected as president of the Nebraska Press Association.

On October 1, 2025, after over 33 years at the helm, the couple turned the newspaper over their youngest son, Kellyn Dump, and his wife, Emily, were named co-publishers. Rob Dump and Peggy Year then moved to part-time status. Dump retains his title as editor, while Year continues to work as a copy editor and graphic designer.
