= Nebraska Bankers Association =

U.S. trade association

The Nebraska Bankers Association (NBA) is a professional trade association for banks in Nebraska. Its headquarters are in the state's capital city of Lincoln. The NBA was founded in 1890.

== Leadership ==
The president and CEO of the NBA is Richard J. Baier.
