= Kimball, Nebraska =

City in and county seat of Kimball County, Nebraska, United States

- City
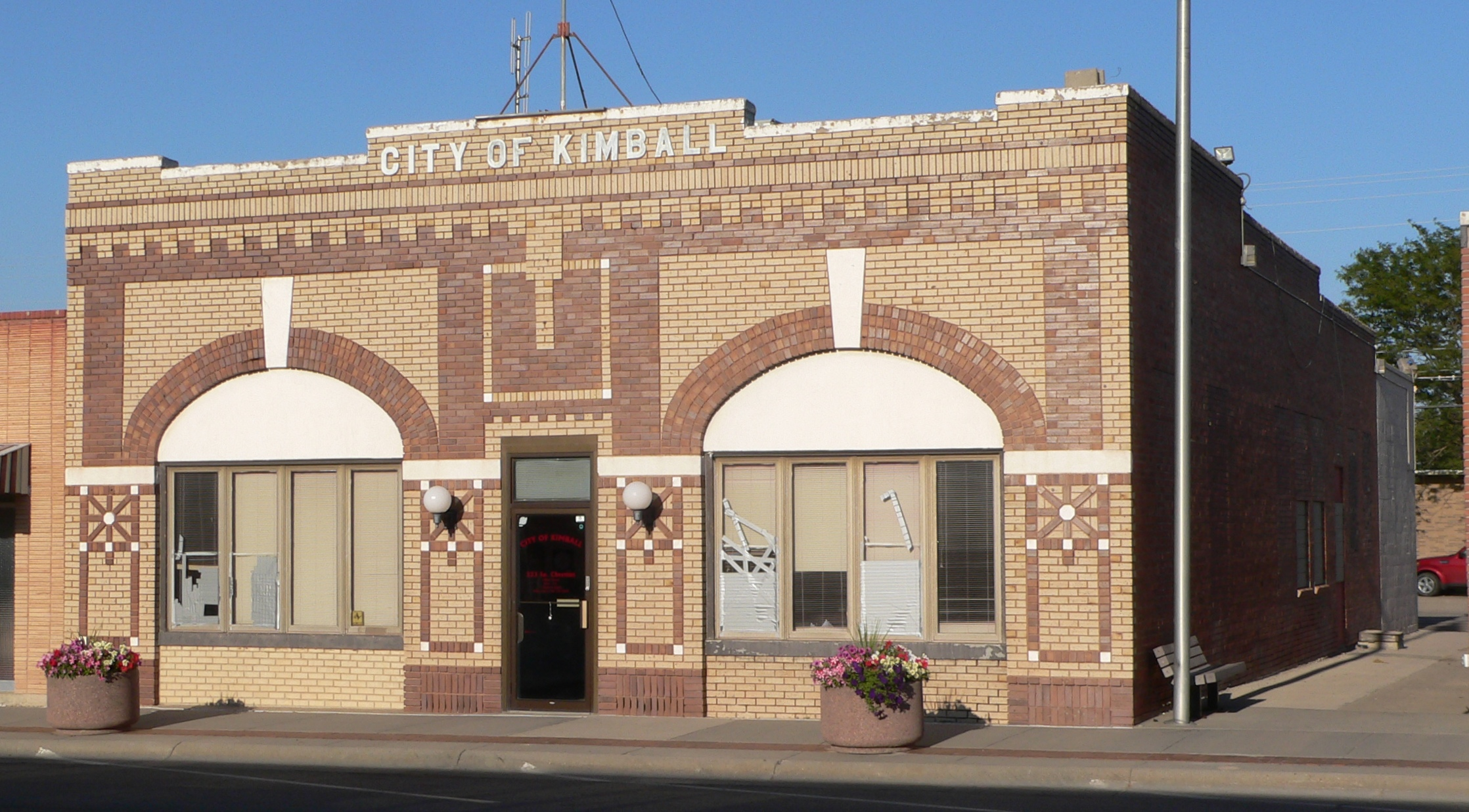
- Kimball City Hall (2010)

- Location within Kimball County and Nebraska
- Coordinates: 41°14′01″N 103°39′05″W
- Country: United States
- State: Nebraska
- County: Kimball

Government
  - Mayor: John Morrison

Area
  - Total: 2.07 sq mi (5.36 km^{2})
  - Land: 2.07 sq mi (5.36 km^{2})
  - Water: 0 sq mi (0.00 km^{2})
- Elevation: 4,725 ft (1,440 m)

Population (2020)
  - Total: 2,290
  - Density: 1,105.6/sq mi (426.89/km^{2})
- Time zone: UTC−7 (Mountain (MST))
  - Summer (DST): UTC−6 (MDT)
- ZIP Code: 69145
- Area code: 308
- FIPS code: 31-25475
- GNIS feature ID: 2395530
- Website: kimballne.org

Kimball is a city in and the county seat of Kimball County, Nebraska, United States. The population was 2,290 at the 2020 census.

== History ==
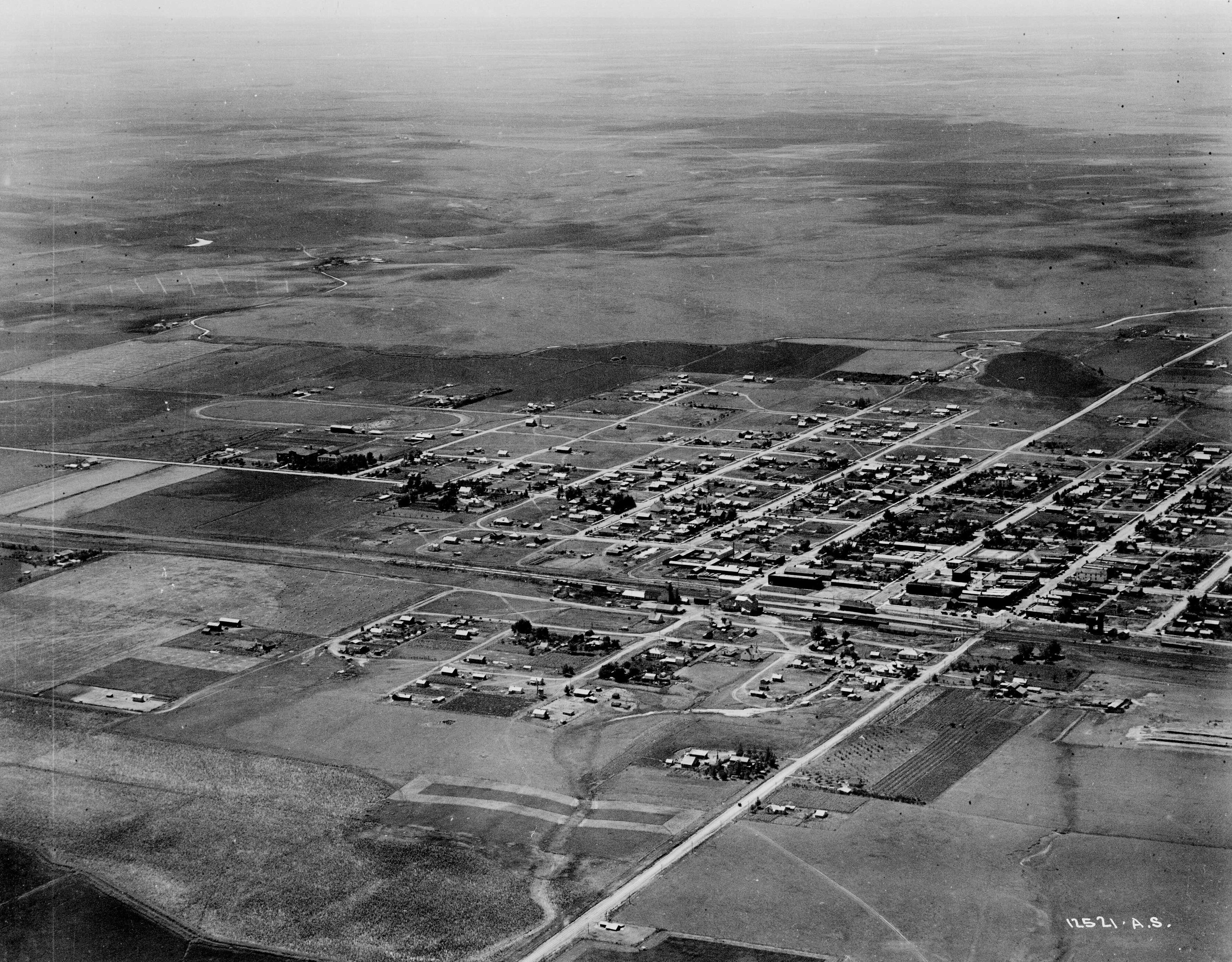
Aerial view of Kimball in 1925

Kimball was originally called Antelopeville, and under the latter name was established circa 1870 when the Union Pacific Railroad was extended to that point. It initially consisted of a telegraph and coal station with a siding and section house. It was renamed in 1885 in honor of Thomas Lord Kimball, a railroad official. Kimball was incorporated in 1888.

== Geography ==
Kimball is located in the southwestern Panhandle. According to the United States Census Bureau, the city has a total area of 2.07 square miles (5.36 km^{2}), all land.

Kimball declares itself as "The High Point of Nebraska!", as the highest point in the state is approximately 33 miles (53 km) from the city. Panorama Point, 5,424 feet (1,653 m) above sea level, is located at N 41 degrees 00.461 minutes, W 104 degrees 01.883 minutes. It is marked by a small monument. However, Kimball itself is not the Nebraska town with the highest elevation: that status belongs to Harrison, at 4,876 feet (1,486 m).

=== Climate ===
Kimball, like much of western Nebraska, has a climate on the border between humid continental (Köppen Dfa/Dfb/Dwa/Dwb) and cool semi-arid (BSk). The climate is characterised by cold and extremely variable winters that can range from quite warm days due to chinook winds to bitter cold under the influence of Arctic air from Canada. Spring is also variable, but heats up gradually, and features frequent thunderstorms that make this the wettest time of year, whilst summer is very warm to hot and can range from extremes of heat and drought to cooler weather with heavy rainfall. The fall season is drier than the spring and gradually cools down, although warm spells due to the chinook are always possible.

Climate data for Kimball, Nebraska (1991–2020 normals, extremes 1893–2017)
Month	Jan	Feb	Mar	Apr	May	Jun	Jul	Aug	Sep	Oct	Nov	Dec	Year
Record high °F (°C)	74 (23)	76 (24)	82 (28)	95 (35)	101 (38)	108 (42)	110 (43)	106 (41)	102 (39)	94 (34)	83 (28)	75 (24)	110 (43)
Mean maximum °F (°C)	62.4 (16.9)	65.1 (18.4)	73.9 (23.3)	81.4 (27.4)	89.5 (31.9)	95.5 (35.3)	99.5 (37.5)	97.9 (36.6)	93.0 (33.9)	84.2 (29.0)	73.3 (22.9)	63.1 (17.3)	100.4 (38.0)
Mean daily maximum °F (°C)	40.3 (4.6)	42.2 (5.7)	51.5 (10.8)	58.0 (14.4)	67.3 (19.6)	79.5 (26.4)	86.2 (30.1)	84.2 (29.0)	76.5 (24.7)	62.2 (16.8)	49.5 (9.7)	40.6 (4.8)	61.5 (16.4)
Daily mean °F (°C)	26.7 (−2.9)	28.2 (−2.1)	36.7 (2.6)	43.5 (6.4)	53.4 (11.9)	64.4 (18.0)	70.8 (21.6)	68.5 (20.3)	59.8 (15.4)	46.3 (7.9)	34.9 (1.6)	26.7 (−2.9)	46.7 (8.2)
Mean daily minimum °F (°C)	13.0 (−10.6)	14.1 (−9.9)	22.0 (−5.6)	29.0 (−1.7)	39.5 (4.2)	49.3 (9.6)	55.4 (13.0)	52.7 (11.5)	43.2 (6.2)	30.5 (−0.8)	20.3 (−6.5)	12.8 (−10.7)	31.8 (−0.1)
Mean minimum °F (°C)	−6.2 (−21.2)	−5.6 (−20.9)	5.9 (−14.5)	15.8 (−9.0)	26.9 (−2.8)	38.4 (3.6)	47.5 (8.6)	45.7 (7.6)	29.4 (−1.4)	16.4 (−8.7)	3.3 (−15.9)	−8.2 (−22.3)	−16.9 (−27.2)
Record low °F (°C)	−36 (−38)	−30 (−34)	−20 (−29)	−11 (−24)	8 (−13)	28 (−2)	37 (3)	26 (−3)	11 (−12)	0 (−18)	−18 (−28)	−35 (−37)	−36 (−38)
Average precipitation inches (mm)	0.28 (7.1)	0.40 (10)	0.87 (22)	1.70 (43)	2.82 (72)	2.35 (60)	2.07 (53)	1.77 (45)	1.42 (36)	1.20 (30)	0.50 (13)	0.45 (11)	15.83 (402)
Average snowfall inches (cm)	3.5 (8.9)	4.6 (12)	4.8 (12)	3.9 (9.9)	1.0 (2.5)	0.0 (0.0)	0.0 (0.0)	0.0 (0.0)	0.3 (0.76)	1.8 (4.6)	4.1 (10)	5.8 (15)	29.8 (76)
Average precipitation days (≥ 0.01 in)	3.0	4.2	4.9	7.1	10.7	9.0	9.0	8.2	6.8	5.7	3.7	3.7	76.0
Average snowy days (≥ 0.1 in)	2.7	3.6	2.9	1.9	0.3	0.0	0.0	0.0	0.2	0.7	2.4	3.3	18.0
Source: NOAA (mean maxima/minima 1981–2010)

== Demographics ==
Historical population
Census	Pop.	Note	%±
1890	193		—
1900	254		31.6%
1910	454		78.7%
1920	1,620		256.8%
1930	1,711		5.6%
1940	1,725		0.8%
1950	2,048		18.7%
1960	4,384		114.1%
1970	3,680		−16.1%
1980	3,120		−15.2%
1990	2,574		−17.5%
2000	2,559		−0.6%
2010	2,496		−2.5%
2020	2,290		−8.3%
U.S. Decennial Census; 2012 Estimate

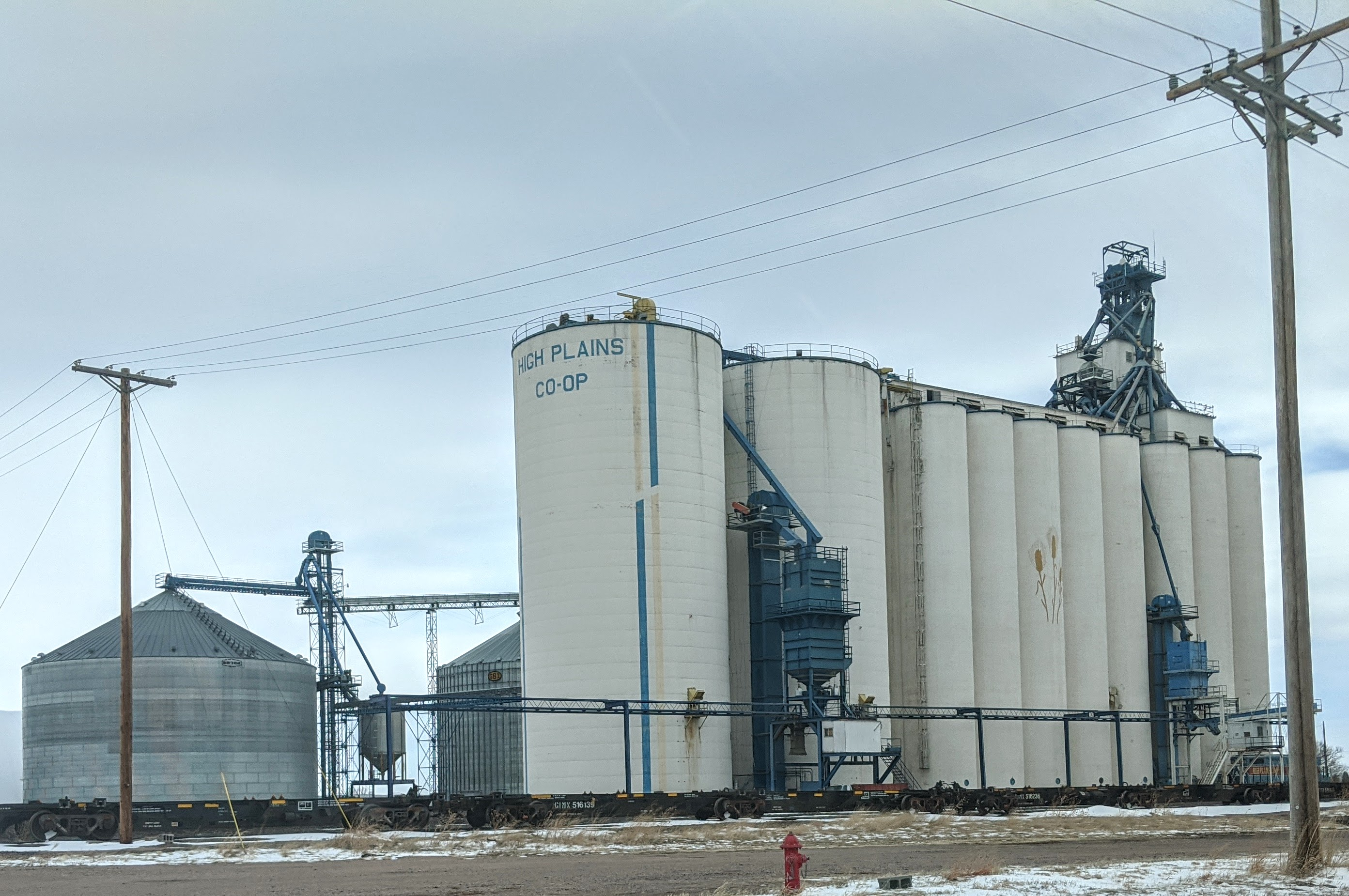
High Plains Co-op grain elevator

=== 2020 census ===
As of the 2020 census, Kimball had a population of 2,290. The median age was 47.9 years. 20.3% of residents were under the age of 18 and 26.6% of residents were 65 years of age or older. For every 100 females there were 97.6 males, and for every 100 females age 18 and over there were 95.1 males age 18 and over.

0.0% of residents lived in urban areas, while 100.0% lived in rural areas.

There were 1,009 households in Kimball, of which 25.2% had children under the age of 18 living in them. Of all households, 45.4% were married-couple households, 22.0% were households with a male householder and no spouse or partner present, and 26.5% were households with a female householder and no spouse or partner present. About 35.5% of all households were made up of individuals and 19.2% had someone living alone who was 65 years of age or older.

There were 1,199 housing units, of which 15.8% were vacant. The homeowner vacancy rate was 3.3% and the rental vacancy rate was 19.5%.

Racial composition as of the 2020 census
Race	Number	Percent
White	2,066	90.2%
Black or African American	1	0.0%
American Indian and Alaska Native	29	1.3%
Asian	10	0.4%
Native Hawaiian and Other Pacific Islander	0	0.0%
Some other race	42	1.8%
Two or more races	142	6.2%
Hispanic or Latino (of any race)	209	9.1%

=== 2010 census ===
As of the census of 2010, there were 2,496 people, 1,110 households, and 651 families living in the city. The population density was 1,205.8 inhabitants per square mile (465.6/km^{2}). There were 1,278 housing units at an average density of 617.4 per square mile (238.4/km^{2}). The racial makeup of the city was 93.8% White, 0.2% African American, 1.5% Native American, 0.4% Asian, 0.1% Pacific Islander, 1.6% from other races, and 2.5% from two or more races. Hispanic or Latino of any race were 7.1% of the population.

There were 1,110 households, of which 26.5% had children under the age of 18 living with them, 45.9% were married couples living together, 8.6% had a female householder with no husband present, 4.1% had a male householder with no wife present, and 41.4% were non-families. 36.8% of all households were made up of individuals, and 18.8% had someone living alone who was 65 years of age or older. The average household size was 2.21 and the average family size was 2.88.

The median age in the city was 44.8 years. 23.2% of residents were under the age of 18; 7.1% were between the ages of 18 and 24; 20% were from 25 to 44; 26.2% were from 45 to 64; and 23.6% were 65 years of age or older. The gender makeup of the city was 48.8% male and 51.2% female.

=== 2000 census ===
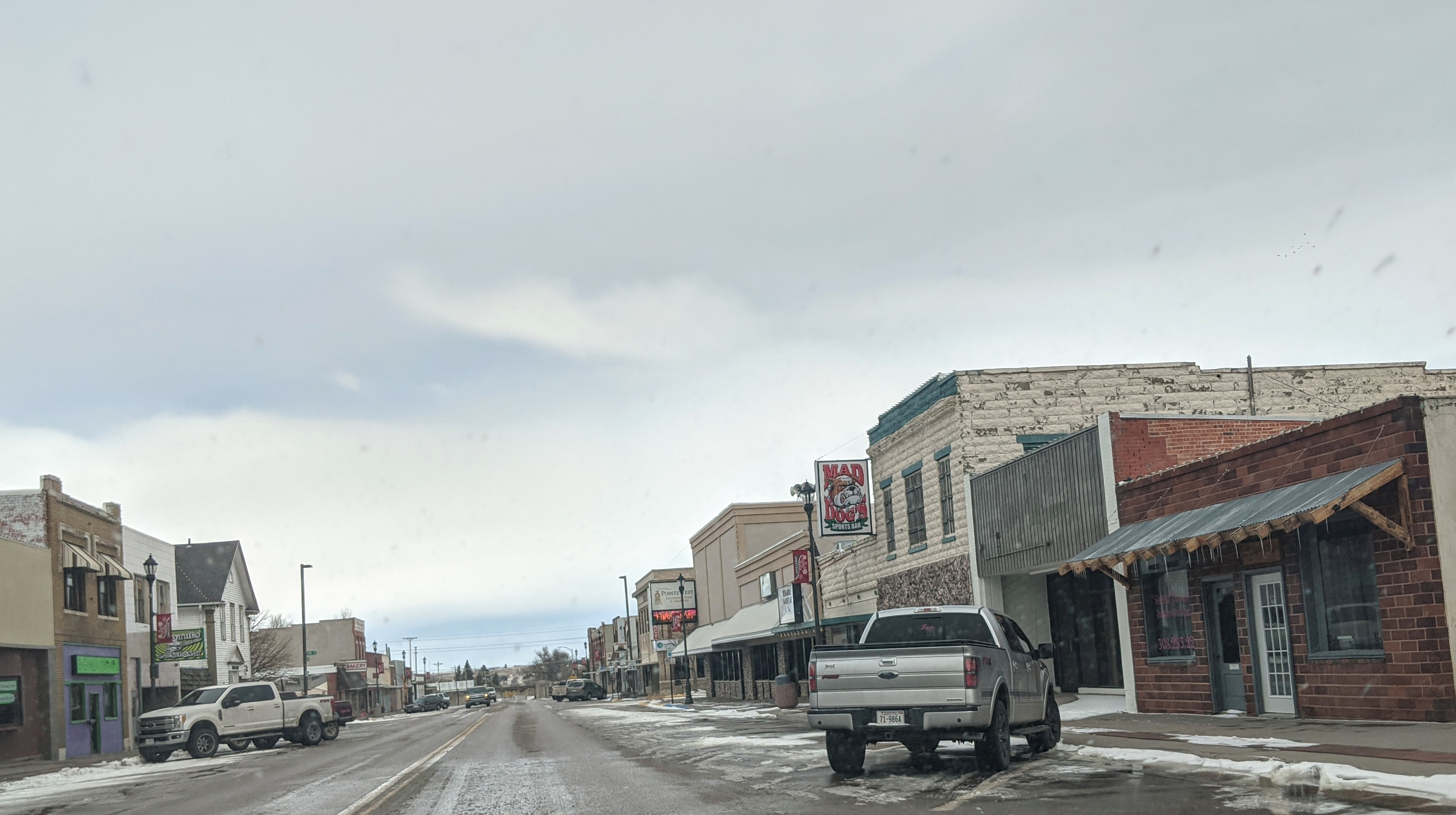
Downtown Kimball

As of the census of 2000, there were 2,559 people, 1,110 households, and 700 families living in the city. The population density was 1,665.8 inhabitants per square mile (643.2/km^{2}). There were 1,210 housing units at an average density of 787.6 per square mile (304.1/km^{2}). The racial makeup of the city was 96.25% White, 0.35% African American, 1.06% Native American, 0.16% Asian, 0.39% from other races, and 1.80% from two or more races. Hispanic or Latino of any race were 3.52% of the population.

There were 1,110 households, out of which 25.4% had children under the age of 18 living with them, 51.8% were married couples living together, 8.0% had a female householder with no husband present, and 36.9% were non-families. 33.7% of all households were made up of individuals, and 18.0% had someone living alone who was 65 years of age or older. The average household size was 2.25 and the average family size was 2.84.

In the city, the population was spread out, with 24.1% under the age of 18, 6.1% from 18 to 24, 23.1% from 25 to 44, 23.3% from 45 to 64, and 23.4% who were 65 years of age or older. The median age was 43 years. For every 100 females, there were 90.0 males. For every 100 females age 18 and over, there were 86.4 males.

As of 2000, the median income for a household in the city was $29,984, and the median income for a family was $37,273. Males had a median income of $29,222 versus $18,198 for females. The per capita income for the city was $18,762. About 7.9% of families and 10.2% of the population were below the poverty line, including 12.6% of those under age 18 and 6.6% of those age 65 or over.

== Economy ==
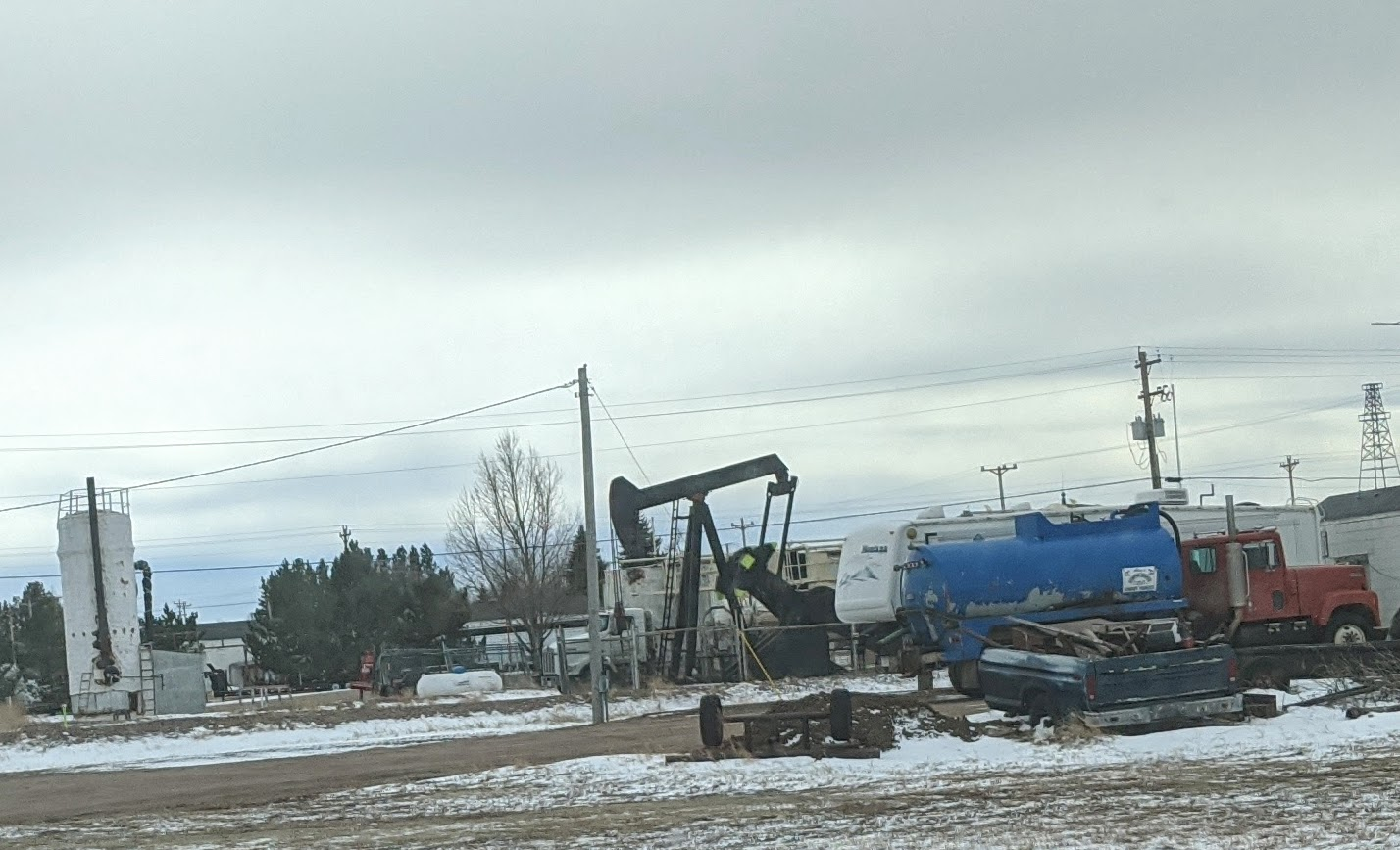
Oil well in Kimball

The Kimball Wind Farm was upgraded from 10.5 to 30MW in 2018. Its annual power generation capacity is sufficient for approximately 11,000 homes.

A number of small oil and gas producers are based in Kimball.

== Parks and recreation ==
Kimball has two parks: City Park and Gotte Park. The latter includes the municipal swimming pool. The 18-hole Four Winds Golf Course is also operated by the city parks and recreation department.

== Transportation ==
Interstate 80 runs east–west, just south of Kimball; there is an exit for the city. U.S. Route 30 runs east–west through the city. Nebraska Highway 71 runs north–south through Kimball.

The Kimball Airport Authority operates a general aviation airport with one 6,199 feet (1,889 m) long runway 3 miles (5 km) south of the city.

The Kimball County Shuttle provides public transportation. The shuttle is equipped for wheelchair accessibility.

== Media ==
The weekly Western Nebraska Observer, serving Kimball and Banner counties, is published in Kimball.

== Notable people ==
- Arthur L. Miller, Congressman and Mayor of Kimball 1933-34
