= Asa Wood =

American politician

Asa Butler Wood (August 26, 1865 - May 7, 1945) was an American politician and newspaper publisher, serving as a state senator in the U.S. state of Nebraska from 1924 to 1930.

== Life ==
Born in Wapello County, Iowa. Wood entered the newspaper business as a printer in his teens. In 1887, at the age of 21, he founded the Gering Courier, a newspaper he ran until his death in 1945. He was known as "the dean of the newspapermen of the Nebraska Panhandle,” and was at one time president of the Nebraska Press Association. He was also a breeder of cattle, and, like many publishers of that time, the local postmaster.

In 1925, he was elected state senator of Nebraska's Thirty-third District. He served as a Republican senator through 1930, and was known as an advocate of clean government and irrigation policy.

Described as a "walking encyclopedia" of western Nebraska history, he served as president of the Nebraska Historical Society from 1936 to 1938.

He left the Courier to his son, Warren Wood, on his death in 1945.
