= Gretna Breeze =

- Type: Weekly newspaper
- Owner: Lee Enterprises
- Publisher: Shon Barenklau
- Editor: Rachel George
- Founded: 1896
- Headquarters: 216 Enterprise Dr, Gretna, Nebraska, United States
- Circulation: 673
- OCLC number: 32436735
- Website: gretnabreeze.com

The Gretna Breeze is a newspaper serving Gretna, Nebraska and surrounding communities. The paper is part of Suburban Newspapers Inc., which is a subsidiary of Omaha World-Herald, which is owned by Lee Enterprises.

== History ==
Established in 1896 by Harold Secord, it would be run by him until his death in 1938. Secord, who died of cancer of the jaw, worked up until the day of his death, proofing the paper at noon before dying that night.

George P. Miller, who was editor of the Papillion Times, purchased the Gretna Breeze from Mr. and Mrs. J.R. Ziegenbein in 1943. Miller published the Gretna Breeze, the Papillion Times, and the Springfield Monitor until his death in 1949. George Miller Jr. continued to own and operate the papers after his father's death. Miller Jr. served a term as president of the Nebraska Press Association in 1965
In 1980, the Gretna Breeze and its parent company Papillion Times Printing Company were purchased by a subsidiary of the Omaha World-Herald. The subsidiary, called Suburban Newspapers Inc. acquired five weekly newspapers, including the Breeze, and named John Gottschalk as president. George Miller Jr., who owned the two companies acquired by Suburban Newspapers Inc. continued to oversee the editorial side of the papers for some time.

Miller Jr. was inducted into the Nebraska Press Association Hall of Fame in 2007. Miller went on to purchase and run other local newspapers, like the Plattsmouth Journal and the Journal-Star Printing Company until 1991 and served as president of the Cass County Historical Society from 1989 to 2009.
