= Gering, Nebraska =

City in and county seat of Scotts Bluff County, Nebraska, United States

- City
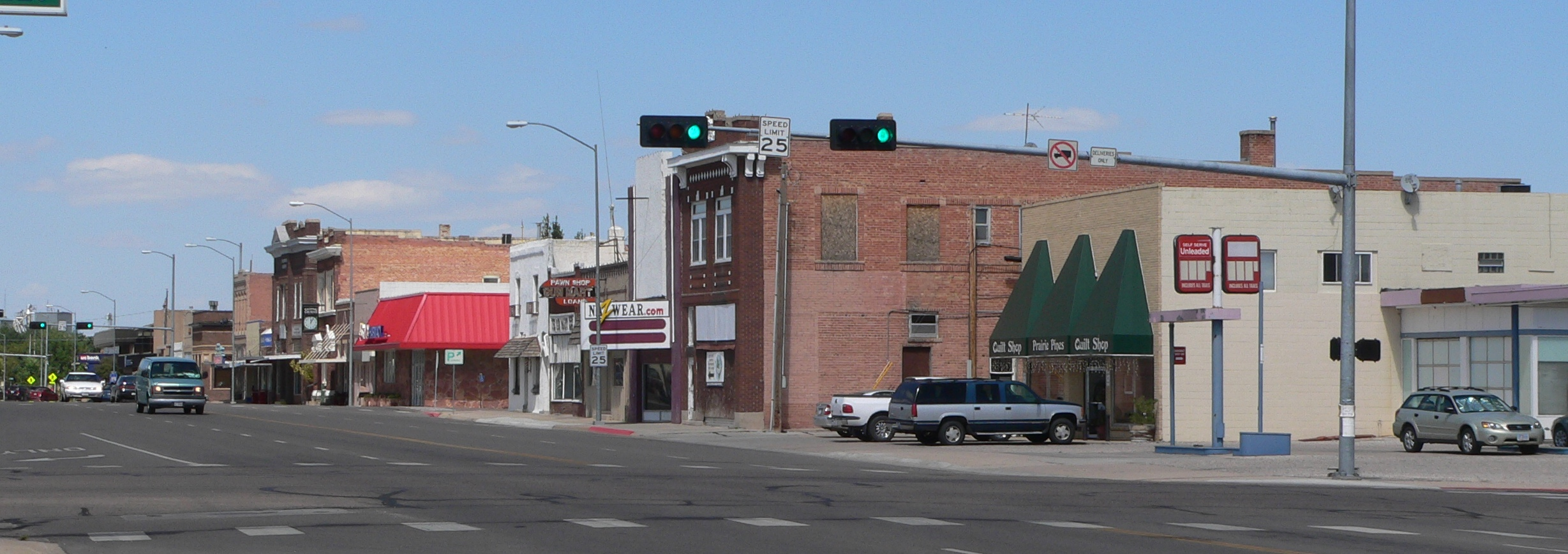
- Downtown at 10th North and M Street (2010)

- Location within Scotts Bluff County and Nebraska
- Coordinates: 41°49′37″N 103°39′45″W
- Country: United States
- State: Nebraska
- County: Scotts Bluff
- Founded: 1887

Government
  - Mayor: Kent Ewing

Area
  - Total: 5.55 sq mi (14.37 km^{2})
  - Land: 5.55 sq mi (14.37 km^{2})
  - Water: 0 sq mi (0.00 km^{2})
- Elevation: 3,921 ft (1,195 m)

Population (2020)
  - Total: 8,564
  - Density: 1,543.3/sq mi (595.86/km^{2})
- Time zone: UTC−7 (Mountain (MST))
  - Summer (DST): UTC−6 (MDT)
- ZIP code: 69341
- Area code: 308
- FIPS code: 31-18580
- GNIS feature ID: 2394885
- Website: gering.org

Gering is a city in and the county seat of Scotts Bluff County, Nebraska, United States, in the Panhandle region of the state. The population was 8,564 at the 2020 census, making it the 17th most populous city in Nebraska.

== History ==
Gering was officially founded on March 7, 1887, being located at the base of the bluff that is now the center of Scotts Bluff National Monument. Although settled in 1886, Gering officially became a town in 1887 by a corporation headed by Oscar Gardner of Broken Bow, Nebraska and named for Martin Gering, a pioneer merchant with whom Gardner started the first dry goods store. Gardner, who was also a lawyer and Gering's first notary public, started the post office 1887, becoming Gering's first Postmaster. Union Pacific Railroad platted the town in 1887, but did not lay any track until 1910. In November 1888, Scottsbluff county split from Cheyenne County, and Gering became the new county seat. The city of Scottsbluff was founded across the North Platte River from the bluff in 1899, by a subsidiary of the Burlington Railroad, and had track and a makeshift depot by 1900. Separated only by the river, the two cities have since grown together and now form the 7th largest urban area in Nebraska.

Gering has been served since its founding by the Gering Courier newspaper.

== Geography ==
According to the United States Census Bureau, the city has a total area of 4.30 square miles (11.14 km^{2}), all of it land.

== Demographics ==
Historical population
Census	Pop.	Note	%±
1900	433		—
1910	627		44.8%
1920	2,508		300.0%
1930	2,531		0.9%
1940	3,104		22.6%
1950	3,842		23.8%
1960	4,585		19.3%
1970	5,639		23.0%
1980	7,760		37.6%
1990	7,946		2.4%
2000	7,751		−2.5%
2010	8,500		9.7%
2020	8,564		0.8%
U.S. Decennial Census; 2012 Estimate

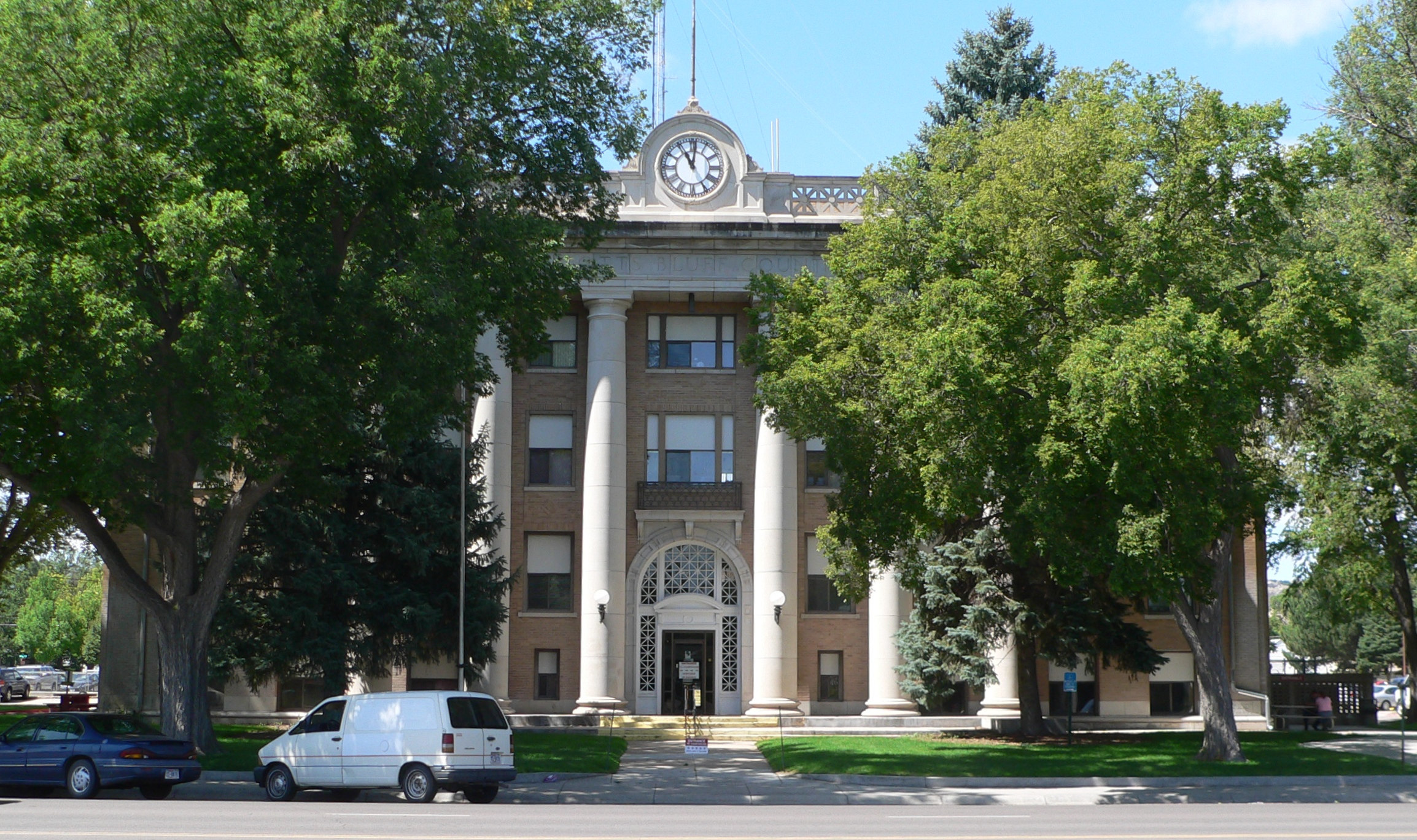
Scotts Bluff County Courthouse

Gering is part of the Scottsbluff, Nebraska Micropolitan Statistical Area.

=== 2020 census ===
As of the 2020 census, Gering had a population of 8,564. The median age was 40.2 years. 23.8% of residents were under the age of 18 and 20.5% were age 65 or older. For every 100 females, there were 94.1 males, and for every 100 females age 18 and over, there were 90.6 males.

99.1% of residents lived in urban areas and 0.9% lived in rural areas.

There were 3,389 households in Gering, of which 30.9% had children under age 18 living in them. Of all households, 48.1% were married-couple households, 16.5% had a male householder with no spouse or partner present, and 28.5% had a female householder with no spouse or partner present. About 30.1% of households were made up of individuals, and 14.9% had someone living alone who was age 65 or older. The average household size was 2.5 and the average family size was 2.9.

There were 3,646 housing units, of which 7.0% were vacant. The homeowner vacancy rate was 1.4% and the rental vacancy rate was 13.3%.

Racial composition as of the 2020 census
Race	Number	Percent
White	6,905	80.6%
Black or African American	76	0.9%
American Indian and Alaska Native	171	2.0%
Asian	54	0.6%
Native Hawaiian and Other Pacific Islander	5	0.1%
Some other race	528	6.2%
Two or more races	825	9.6%
Hispanic or Latino (of any race)	1,628	19.0%

The 2016–2020 5-year American Community Survey estimates show that the median household income was $62,764 (with a margin of error of +/- $5,611) and the median family income $75,284 (+/- $16,092). Males had a median income of $33,358 (+/- $6,266) versus $32,025 (+/- $2,992) for females. The median income for those above 16 years old was $32,416 (+/- $2,996). Approximately, 7.1% of families and 8.4% of the population were below the poverty line, including 5.3% of those under the age of 18 and 12.3% of those ages 65 or over.

=== 2010 census ===
At the 2010 census there were 8,500 people, 3,361 households, and 2,278 families living in the city. The population density was 1,976.7 inhabitants per square mile (763.2/km^{2}). There were 3,601 housing units at an average density of 837.4 per square mile (323.3/km^{2}). The racial makeup of the city was 89.6% White, 0.6% African American, 1.5% Native American, 0.4% Asian, 0.1% Pacific Islander, 5.5% from other races, and 2.4% from two or more races. Hispanic or Latino of any race were 17.2%.

Of the 3,361 households 32.8% had children under the age of 18 living with them, 52.8% were married couples living together, 11.5% had a female householder with no husband present, 3.5% had a male householder with no wife present, and 32.2% were non-families. 28.1% of households were one person and 14.7% were one person aged 65 or older. The average household size was 2.45 and the average family size was 2.99.

The median age was 38.7 years. 25.6% of residents were under the age of 18; 7.4% were between the ages of 18 and 24; 23.5% were from 25 to 44; 26.3% were from 45 to 64; and 17.1% were 65 or older. The gender makeup of the city was 46.9% male and 53.1% female.

== Education ==
It is in the Gering Public Schools school district.

== Transportation ==
Gering has been served by public transit since January 10, 2018, with two bus routes provided by Tri-City Roadrunner.

== Notable people ==
- Kip Gross - Former Major League baseball pitcher.
- Galen B. Jackman - U.S. Army Major General (retired), Nancy Reagan's escort throughout the state funeral proceedings of former U.S. President Ronald Reagan, first commanding general of Joint Force Headquarters National Capital Region.
- Dave Raymond - Major League Baseball broadcaster with the Texas Rangers.
- James G. Roudebush - U.S. Air Force Lieutenant General, former Surgeon General of the United States Air Force.
- Teresa Scanlan - Miss Nebraska 2010, Miss America 2011.
- Adrian Smith - U.S. House of Representatives, Nebraska's 3rd District.
- Asa Wood - Former state senator, president of the Nebraska Press Association, long-time publisher of the Gering Courier, and stockholder of the Scottsbluff Star-Herald

== Points of interest ==
- Scotts Bluff National Monument - 3 mi. W
- Northfield Park Arboretum
- Wildcat Hills State Recreation Area - 10 mi. S
- Legacy of the Plains Museum
- Scottsbluff, Nebraska - 3 mi. N
- Oregon Trail Park
- Union Pacific Railroad 2-8-0 Steam Locomotive No. 423
- Five Rocks Amphitheater
- Cedar Canyon
- Carter Canyon

== International sister city ==
- Bamyan, Afghanistan
