= National Register of Historic Places listings in Morrill County, Nebraska =

Location of Morrill County in Nebraska

Morrill County, Nebraska, United States, has eight properties and districts listed on the National Register of Historic Places.

The locations of National Register properties and districts for which the latitude and longitude coordinates are included below may be seen in a map.

This National Park Service list is complete through NPS recent listings posted October 30, 2026.

== Current listings ==
| | Name on the Register | Image | Date listed | Location | City or town | Description |
|---|---|---|---|---|---|---|
| 1 | Camp Clarke Bridge Site | Camp Clarke Bridge Site | November 8, 1974 (#74001129) | West of Bridgeport; 41°41′24″N 103°10′43″W | Bridgeport | Site of a wooden toll bridge built in 1875 to serve the Dakota gold fields. |
| 2 | Chimney Rock National Historic Site | Chimney Rock National Historic Site | October 15, 1966 (#66000116) | 3 miles (4.8 km) southwest of Bayard; 41°42′09″N 103°20′49″W | Bayard | |
| 3 | Courthouse and Jail House Rocks | Courthouse and Jail House Rocks | April 24, 1973 (#73001067) | 5 miles (8.0 km) south of Bridgeport; 41°36′02″N 103°07′00″W | Bridgeport | |
| 4 | Greenwood Stage Station | | March 13, 2012 (#12000106) | Appr. location 41°30′07″N 103°04′57″W | Bridgeport | |
| 5 | Morrill County Courthouse | Morrill County Courthouse | January 10, 1990 (#89002227) | Main St. between 6th and 7th Sts. 41°40′07″N 103°06′00″W | Bridgeport | |
| 6 | Mud Springs Station Archeological District | Mud Springs Station Archeological District | April 24, 1973 (#73001068) | County road 107 between 68 and 70; 41°29′04″N 103°01′02″W | Dalton | Originally listed as "Mud Springs Pony Express Station Site"; boundaries increased on September 6, 2011 |
| 7 | Rush Creek Battlefield | Rush Creek Battlefield | September 6, 2011 (#11000619) | Southern side of the Platte River at the mouth of Rush Creek; 41°33′05″N 102°48′45″W | Broadwater | |
| 8 | Schuetz Log Cabin | Schuetz Log Cabin | March 21, 2011 (#11000105) | HC 82 Box 103; 41°29′57″N 103°05′17″W | Dalton | A settler family's log cabin, built during 1900-20. |

== See also ==
- List of National Historic Landmarks in Nebraska
- National Register of Historic Places listings in Nebraska
