= Camp Clarke Bridge Site =

- U.S. National Register of Historic Places
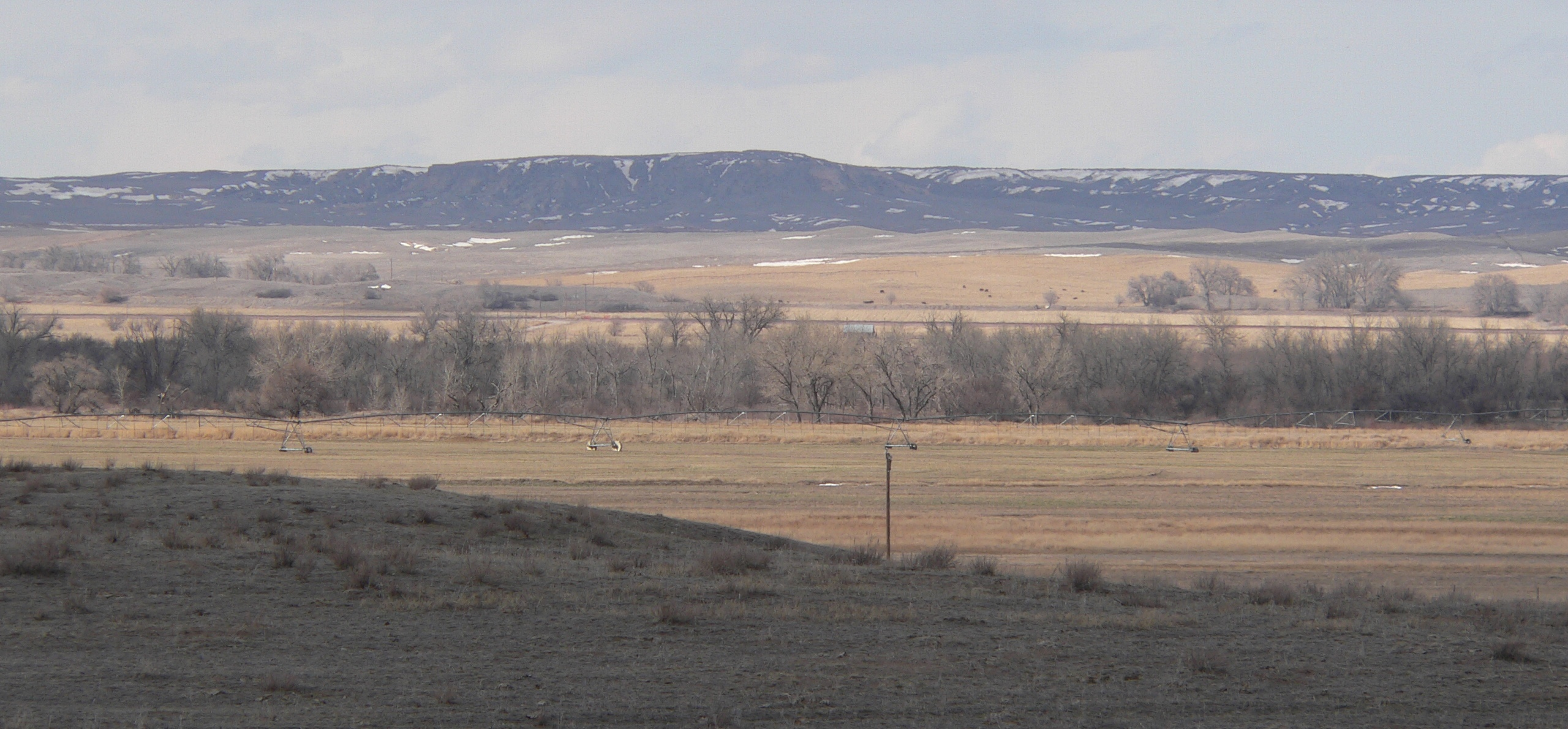

- Location within Nebraska Location within the United States
- Nearest city: Bridgeport, Nebraska
- Coordinates: 41°40′12.59″N 103°10′8.08″W
- Area: 120 acres (49 ha)
- Built: 1875
- Built by: Clarke, Henry T.
- NRHP reference No.: 74001129
- Added to NRHP: November 8, 1974

The Camp Clarke Bridge Site in Morrill County, Nebraska, near Bridgeport dates from 1875. Also known as 25 MO 68, it was listed on the National Register of Historic Places in 1974.

It is the location of a toll bridge built in 1875 by entrepreneur Henry T. Clarke, who provided a crossing over the North Platte River for what became the Sidney-Black Hills Trail. The trail provided access for freight wagons, stagecoaches and other vehicles headed to and from the Dakota gold fields, from the Union Pacific railway trailhead at Fort Sidney, Nebraska.

It is about 9 miles east from Chimney Rock and three miles west of Bridgeport, Nebraska. Historic photos show a wooden truss bridge built on pilings in the soft ground of the river. It was "a massive structure... Two thousand feet in length with a solid six to one truss span." It was the only reliable crossing between Fort Laramie and North Platte, Nebraska.

At the time of the NRHP listing in 1974, the North Platte no longer flowed through the bridge location, but was rather slightly to the north.

On February 12, 1899, Camp Clarke recorded a daily minimum temperature of −47 °F (−44 °C), which is the lowest temperature ever recorded in the state of Nebraska.

== See also ==
- Greenwood Stage Station, also on the Sidney-Black Hills Trail, also NRHP-listed
