= Courthouse and Jail Rocks =

- Courthouse and Jail House Rocks
- U.S. National Register of Historic Places
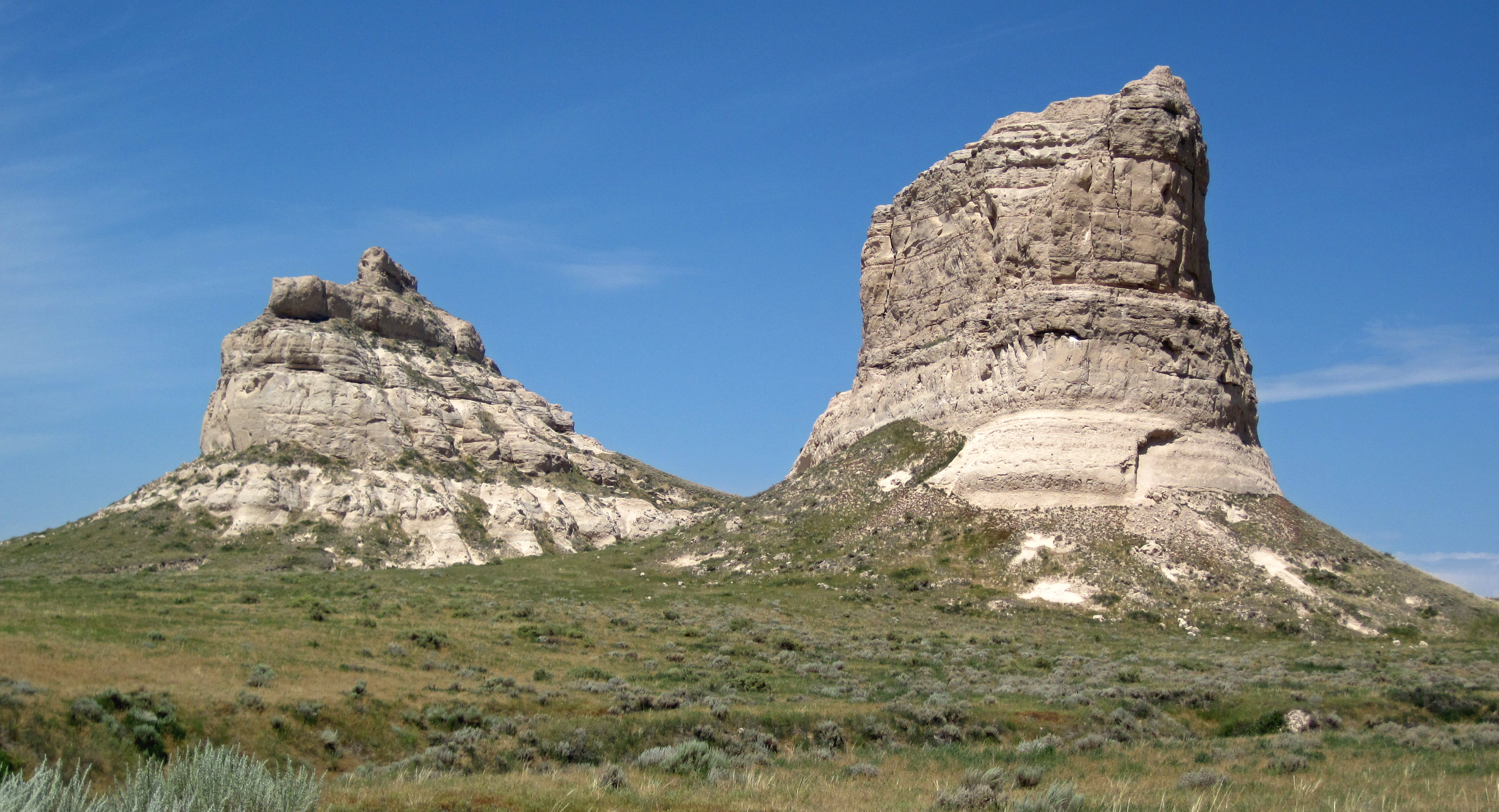
- Courthouse and Jail Rocks

- Location within Nebraska Location within the United States
- Nearest city: Bridgeport, Nebraska
- Coordinates: 41°35′49″N 103°06′57″W
- Area: 917 acres (371 ha)
- NRHP reference No.: 73001067
- Added to NRHP: April 24, 1973

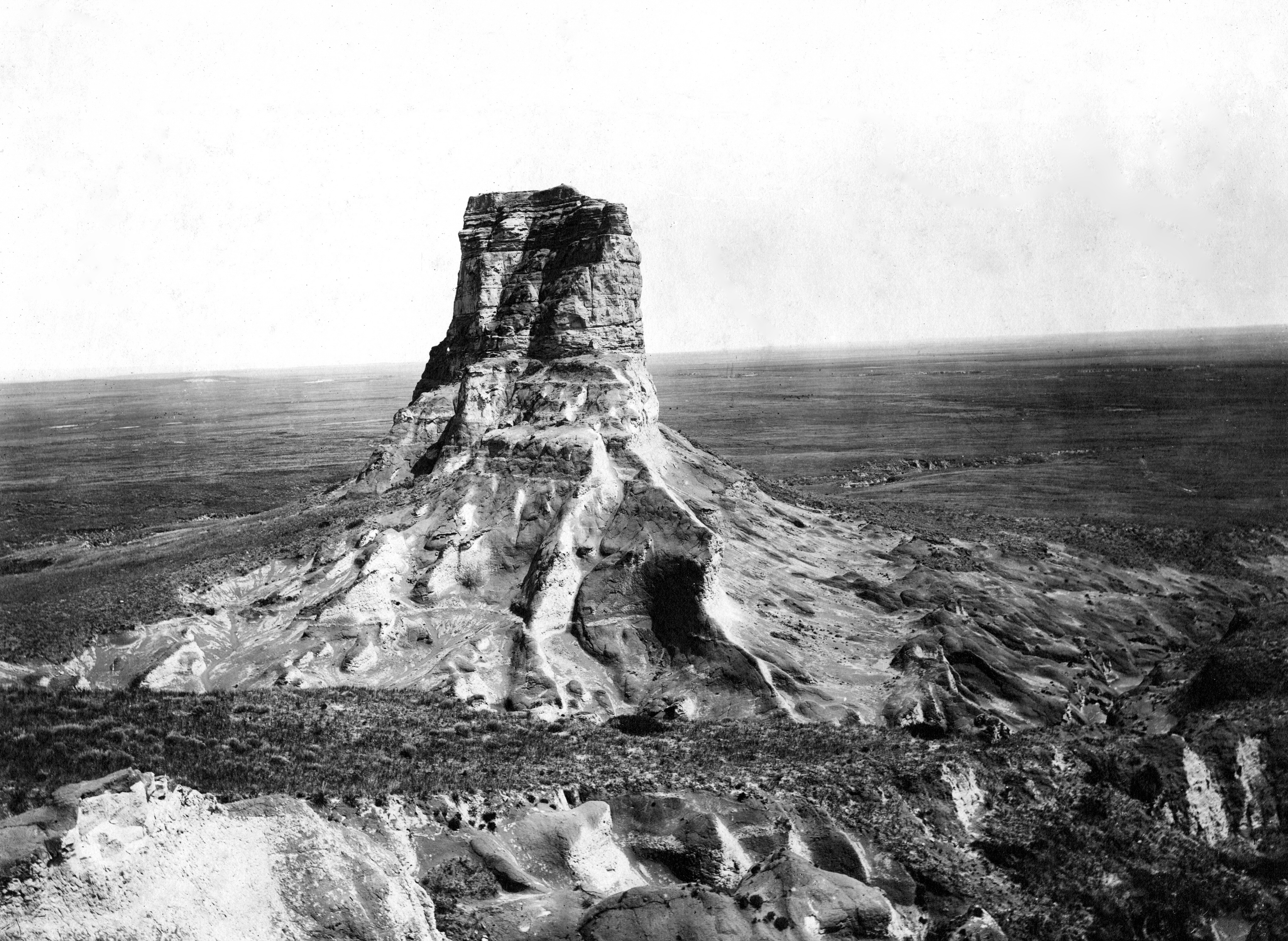
Jail Rock from the west (1897)

Courthouse and Jail Rocks are two rock formations located near Bridgeport in the Nebraska Panhandle.

The Oregon-California Trail, the Mormon Trail, the Pony Express Trail and the Sidney-Deadwood Trail all ran near the rocks. The pair of rock formations served as a landmark along the trails for many pioneers traveling west in the 19th century. Many travelers would stray as much as five miles (8 km) from the Oregon Trail just to get a glimpse of the rocks.

Hundreds of westward-bound emigrants mentioned Courthouse Rock (originally also McFarlan's Castle) in their travel logs and journals. The name "Courthouse" was first used in 1837. In 1845, one traveler described the rock as "resembling the ruins of an old castle [which] rises abruptly from the plain....It is difficult to look upon it and not believe that art had something to do with its construction. The voyagers have called it the Courthouse; but it looks infinitely more like the Capitol."

Courthouse and Jail Rocks, which rise 400 feet (120 m) above the North Platte Valley, are composed of Brule clay, Gering sandstone and volcanic ash. The rock formations are listed in the National Register of Historic Places and in the Nebraska Natural Areas Register.

== History ==
Robert Stuart first recorded Court House and Jail House Rock in 1812. By 1849 and the California Gold Rush, the promontories had been described as Castles, a Church, and Coffins. The name Court House and Jail House became the most common. Pumpkin Creek forms an oxbow near the buttes where a meadow with trees make a suitable campsite. There is evidence that fur trappers, Native Americans, gold seekers on their way to California and the Black Hills, and the military once camped in this bend. Further to the southeast on Pumpkin Creek, is the site of a Pony Express Station. The Pony Express and the military used a shorter route on the west side as did the Sidney-Black Hills Trail. The buttes are the first promontories along the trail coming from the east. Even for those emigrants who used the Julesburg, Colorado crossing of the South Platte River, the buttes are mentioned in their diaries.

== Geology ==
Court House and Jail House Rocks are remnants of an ancient plateau, that was split by the North Platte River. They are remnants of the nearby hills that have become separated over time. At an elevation of 4,050 feet (1,230 m) above sea level they rise 240 feet (73 m) above Pumpkin Creek. Courthouse and Jail Rocks, which rise 400 feet (120 m) above the North Platte Valley, are composed of Brule clay, Gering sandstone and volcanic ash. The rock formations are listed in the National Register of Historic Places and in the Nebraska Natural Areas Register.

== See also ==
- Landmarks of the Nebraska Territory
- Chimney Rock National Historic Site
