= Greenwood Stage Station =

- U.S. National Register of Historic Places
- Location within Nebraska Location within the United States
- Nearest city: Bridgeport, Nebraska
- Coordinates: 41°30′7″N 103°4′57″W
- NRHP reference No.: 12000106
- Added to NRHP: March 12, 2012

The Greenwood Stage Station was a historic stagecoach stop located in what is now rural Morrill County, Nebraska. It was the second stage station on the Sidney-Black Hills Trail, when coming north from the Union Pacific railroad at Fort Sidney, Nebraska, on the way to gold mining fields in South Dakota. It played a significant role along the trail, serving travellers as a hotel, restaurant, and stable, as well as furnishing fresh horses for stagecoaches.

The archaeological site at the station's former location, denoted 25MO32, is a historic archaeological site that was listed on the National Register of Historic Places in 2012. Its significance arises from its status as one of the trail's few remaining stage stations with extant artifactual and structural remains.

Its location is not revealed by the National Register, which lists it as "Address Restricted". It was listed as an archeological site with potential for future information.
