= Hemingford, Nebraska =

Village in Nebraska, United States

- Village
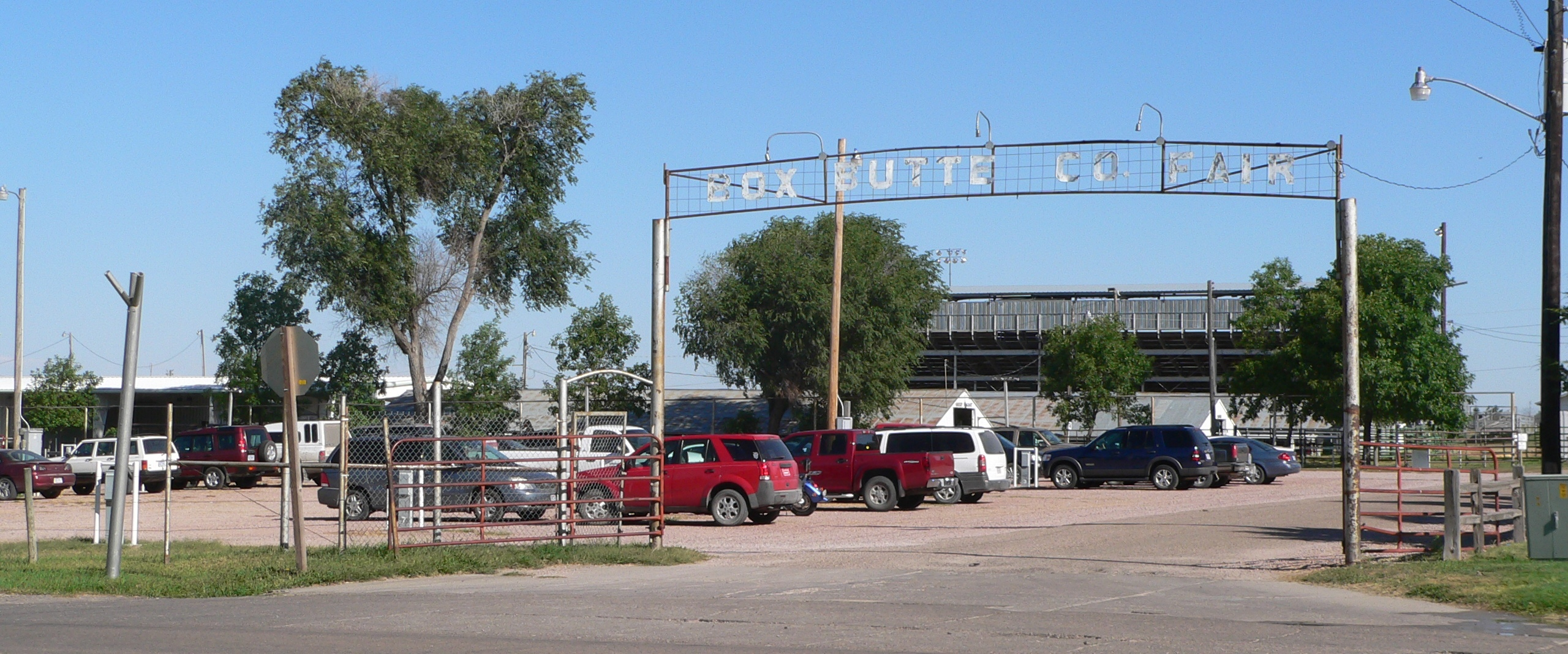
- Box Butte County Fairgrounds in Hemingford

- Location of Hemingford, Nebraska

- Location within the United States
- Coordinates: 42°19′17″N 103°04′31″W
- Country: United States
- State: Nebraska
- County: Box Butte

Area
  - Total: 0.68 sq mi (1.76 km^{2})
  - Land: 0.68 sq mi (1.76 km^{2})
  - Water: 0 sq mi (0.00 km^{2})
- Elevation: 4,272 ft (1,302 m)

Population (2020)
  - Total: 787
  - Density: 1,157.6/sq mi (446.94/km^{2})
- Time zone: UTC-7 (Mountain (MST))
  - Summer (DST): UTC-6 (MDT)
- ZIP code: 69348
- Area code: 308
- FIPS code: 31-22045
- GNIS feature ID: 2398485
- Website: ci.hemingford.ne.us

Hemingford is a village in Box Butte County, Nebraska, United States. The population was 787 at the 2020 census.

== History ==
Hemingford was incorporated as a village in 1886. The founder being a native of Hemmingford, Quebec, caused the name to be selected.

== Geography ==
According to the United States Census Bureau, the village has a total area of 0.68 square miles (1.76 km^{2}), all land.

=== Climate ===
Climate data for Hemingford, Nebraska (1991–2020 normals, extremes 1964–2018)
Month	Jan	Feb	Mar	Apr	May	Jun	Jul	Aug	Sep	Oct	Nov	Dec	Year
Record high °F (°C)	70 (21)	71 (22)	80 (27)	89 (32)	95 (35)	104 (40)	107 (42)	102 (39)	98 (37)	90 (32)	79 (26)	70 (21)	107 (42)
Mean maximum °F (°C)	59.0 (15.0)	61.6 (16.4)	71.4 (21.9)	79.6 (26.4)	87.8 (31.0)	94.1 (34.5)	99.4 (37.4)	97.0 (36.1)	92.1 (33.4)	82.2 (27.9)	70.4 (21.3)	60.0 (15.6)	99.9 (37.7)
Mean daily maximum °F (°C)	37.6 (3.1)	39.2 (4.0)	49.3 (9.6)	56.9 (13.8)	66.6 (19.2)	78.6 (25.9)	86.5 (30.3)	84.7 (29.3)	75.5 (24.2)	60.9 (16.1)	48.0 (8.9)	38.0 (3.3)	60.1 (15.6)
Daily mean °F (°C)	26.9 (−2.8)	28.6 (−1.9)	37.5 (3.1)	45.0 (7.2)	54.8 (12.7)	65.8 (18.8)	73.0 (22.8)	71.1 (21.7)	62.1 (16.7)	48.2 (9.0)	36.6 (2.6)	27.3 (−2.6)	48.1 (8.9)
Mean daily minimum °F (°C)	16.1 (−8.8)	18.0 (−7.8)	25.6 (−3.6)	33.0 (0.6)	43.0 (6.1)	53.0 (11.7)	59.4 (15.2)	57.5 (14.2)	48.7 (9.3)	35.5 (1.9)	25.3 (−3.7)	16.5 (−8.6)	36.0 (2.2)
Mean minimum °F (°C)	−5.5 (−20.8)	−4.2 (−20.1)	6.3 (−14.3)	17.3 (−8.2)	28.6 (−1.9)	40.8 (4.9)	49.6 (9.8)	47.5 (8.6)	32.3 (0.2)	18.4 (−7.6)	5.2 (−14.9)	−5.8 (−21.0)	−15.6 (−26.4)
Record low °F (°C)	−28 (−33)	−25 (−32)	−13 (−25)	−6 (−21)	18 (−8)	31 (−1)	41 (5)	37 (3)	20 (−7)	−3 (−19)	−12 (−24)	−31 (−35)	−31 (−35)
Average precipitation inches (mm)	0.31 (7.9)	0.54 (14)	0.96 (24)	2.14 (54)	3.00 (76)	2.94 (75)	2.61 (66)	1.83 (46)	1.48 (38)	1.22 (31)	0.51 (13)	0.47 (12)	18.01 (457)
Average snowfall inches (cm)	5.3 (13)	7.6 (19)	6.1 (15)	7.2 (18)	1.6 (4.1)	0.0 (0.0)	0.0 (0.0)	0.0 (0.0)	0.6 (1.5)	2.9 (7.4)	5.6 (14)	8.5 (22)	45.4 (115)
Average precipitation days (≥ 0.01 in)	4.1	5.4	5.5	8.7	11.2	10.9	8.5	7.1	6.5	6.5	4.5	4.6	83.5
Average snowy days (≥ 0.1 in)	3.7	4.4	3.6	3.2	0.5	0.0	0.0	0.0	0.3	1.3	3.3	4.1	24.4
Source: NOAA (mean maxima/minima 1981–2010)

== Demographics ==
Historical population
Census	Pop.	Note	%±
1900	133		—
1910	272		104.5%
1920	708		160.3%
1930	1,025		44.8%
1940	792		−22.7%
1950	946		19.4%
1960	904		−4.4%
1970	734		−18.8%
1980	1,023		39.4%
1990	953		−6.8%
2000	993		4.2%
2010	803		−19.1%
2020	787		−2.0%
U.S. Decennial Census

=== 2010 census ===
As of the census of 2010, there were 803 people, 335 households, and 220 families residing in the village. The population density was 1,180.9 inhabitants per square mile (455.9/km^{2}). There were 418 housing units at an average density of 614.7 per square mile (237.3/km^{2}). The racial makeup of the village was 96.1% White, 0.4% African American, 1.2% Native American, 0.1% from other races, and 2.1% from two or more races. Hispanic or Latino of any race were 4.6% of the population.

There were 335 households, of which 31.9% had children under the age of 18 living with them, 50.1% were married couples living together, 11.9% had a female householder with no husband present, 3.6% had a male householder with no wife present, and 34.3% were non-families. 31.6% of all households were made up of individuals, and 13.8% had someone living alone who was 65 years of age or older. The average household size was 2.31 and the average family size was 2.91.

The median age in the village was 42.2 years. 26.9% of residents were under the age of 18; 5.6% were between the ages of 18 and 24; 21.1% were from 25 to 44; 31.1% were from 45 to 64; and 15.3% were 65 years of age or older. The gender makeup of the village was 48.4% male and 51.6% female.

=== 2000 census ===
As of the census of 2000, there were 993 people, 373 households, and 258 families residing in the village. The population density was 1,530.4 inhabitants per square mile (590.9/km^{2}). There were 438 housing units at an average density of 675.1 per square mile (260.7/km^{2}). The racial makeup of the village was 93.15% White, 1.01% Native American, 3.32% from other races, and 2.52% from two or more races. Hispanic or Latino of any race were 6.85% of the population.

There were 373 households, out of which 38.9% had children under the age of 18 living with them, 56.3% were married couples living together, 9.9% had a female householder with no husband present, and 30.6% were non-families. 28.4% of all households were made up of individuals, and 15.0% had someone living alone who was 65 years of age or older. The average household size was 2.58 and the average family size was 3.18.

In the village, the population was spread out, with 30.5% under the age of 18, 7.0% from 18 to 24, 25.9% from 25 to 44, 20.6% from 45 to 64, and 15.9% who were 65 years of age or older. The median age was 38 years. For every 100 females, there were 97.0 males. For every 100 females age 18 and over, there were 90.1 males.

As of 2000 the median income for a household in the village was $35,982, and the median income for a family was $44,167. Males had a median income of $32,159 versus $20,500 for females. The per capita income for the village was $14,944. About 8.8% of families and 10.2% of the population were below the poverty line, including 10.9% of those under age 18 and 16.4% of those age 65 or over.

== Disasters ==
The KDUH/CH4 TV Mast was a guyed TV mast constructed near Hemingford in 1969 for TV transmitting, at 42°10′21″N 103°13′59″W.

The tower collapsed on September 24, 2002, during reconstruction work. Two tower workers, Lawrence A. Sukalec, 59, of Valier, Illinois, and Daniel E. Goff, 25, of Sesser, Illinois, were killed in the process, and three were injured on the ground. The collapse occurred as strengthening measures were being taken so the 30+ year-old tower could accommodate the added weight of digital television transmission facilities. Investigations later found that the contractors neglected to stabilize the tower while original structural components were being replaced with stronger ones.

KDUH resumed full-power broadcasts one year later from a new tower near Angora.

== In popular culture ==
Author Stephen King adapted Hemingford's name for the fictional town of Hemingford Home, Nebraska, which appears in several of his works.
