= Fort Sidney =

Former fort in Nebraska, U.S.

Coordinates: 41°08′34″N 102°58′19″W

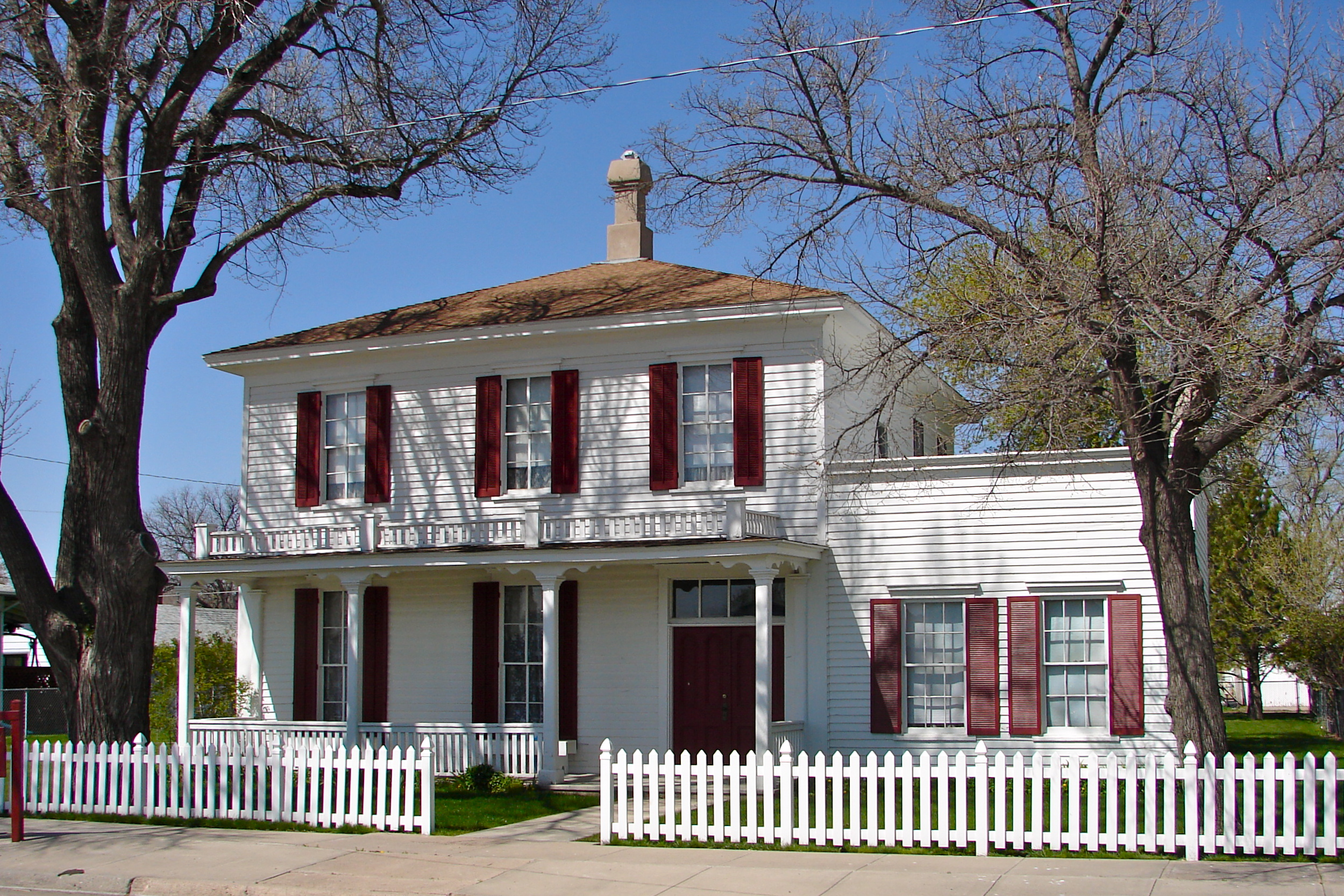
Fort Sidney Commander's Quarters

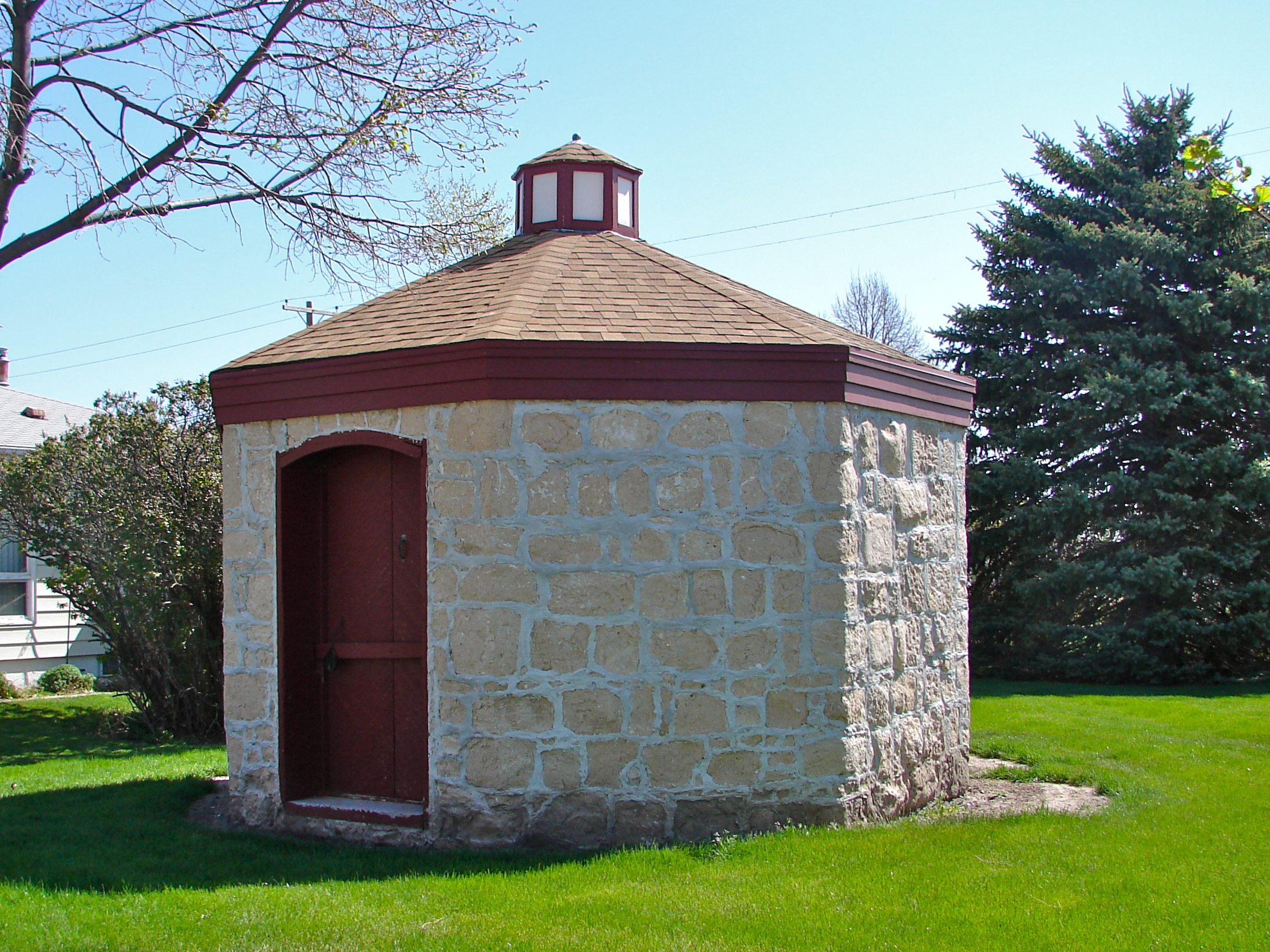
Powder magazine

Fort Sidney is a historic fort located in Sidney, Nebraska, United States. The 37th Infantry Regiment established "Sidney Station" at a point midway between the Platte Rivers, where the modern community of Sidney, Nebraska, now stands. Initially the installation was a block house on a bluff with soldiers residing in tents nearby. That Spring, Fort Sedgewick, Colorado, was abandoned and the wooden buildings moved by mule train to a location beneath the bluffs and on the Lodgepole creek. This new garrison was named Sidney Barracks; during the command of Caleb H. Carlton from January 1879 to May 1880, the post was designated Fort Sidney.

The Union Pacific railroad eventually arrived and the fort was a trailhead for the Sidney-Black Hills Trail to the gold prospecting and mining areas of the Dakotas. The Greenwood Stage Station was a stagecoach stop on the trail. The trail crossed the North Platte River at Camp Clarke Bridge Site. The fort closed in 1894.

The Fort Sidney Complex is a museum of the remaining fort buildings. The complex includes the married officer's quarters which houses the Cheyenne County Museum, the Commander's Home which has been restored and outfitted with late 19th-century period furnishings, and a powder house.

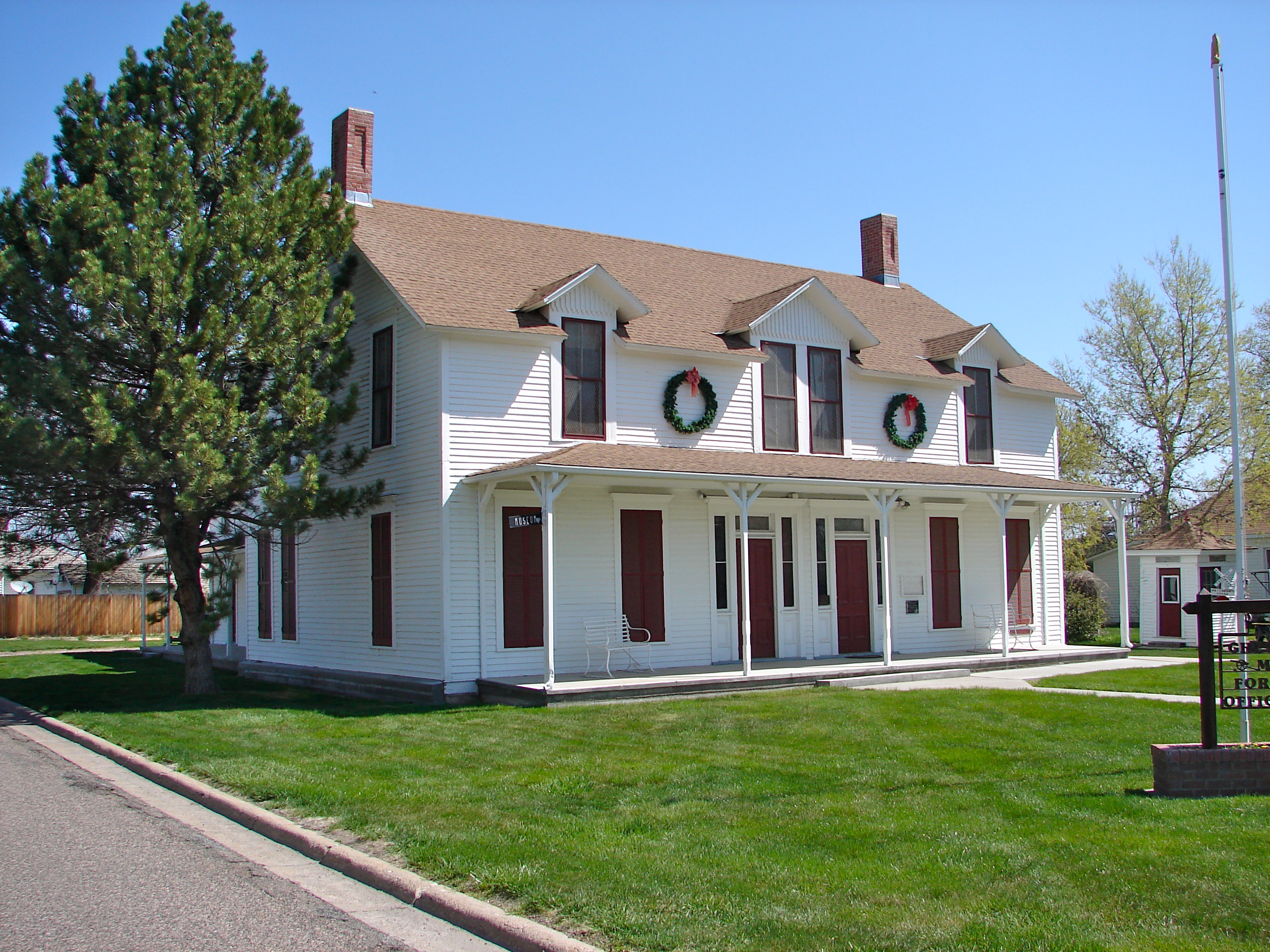
Officers' Quarters - Cheyenne County Museum
