= Lynn, Nebraska =

Unincorporated community in Nebraska, U.S.

Coordinates: 41°48′05″N 102°58′35″W

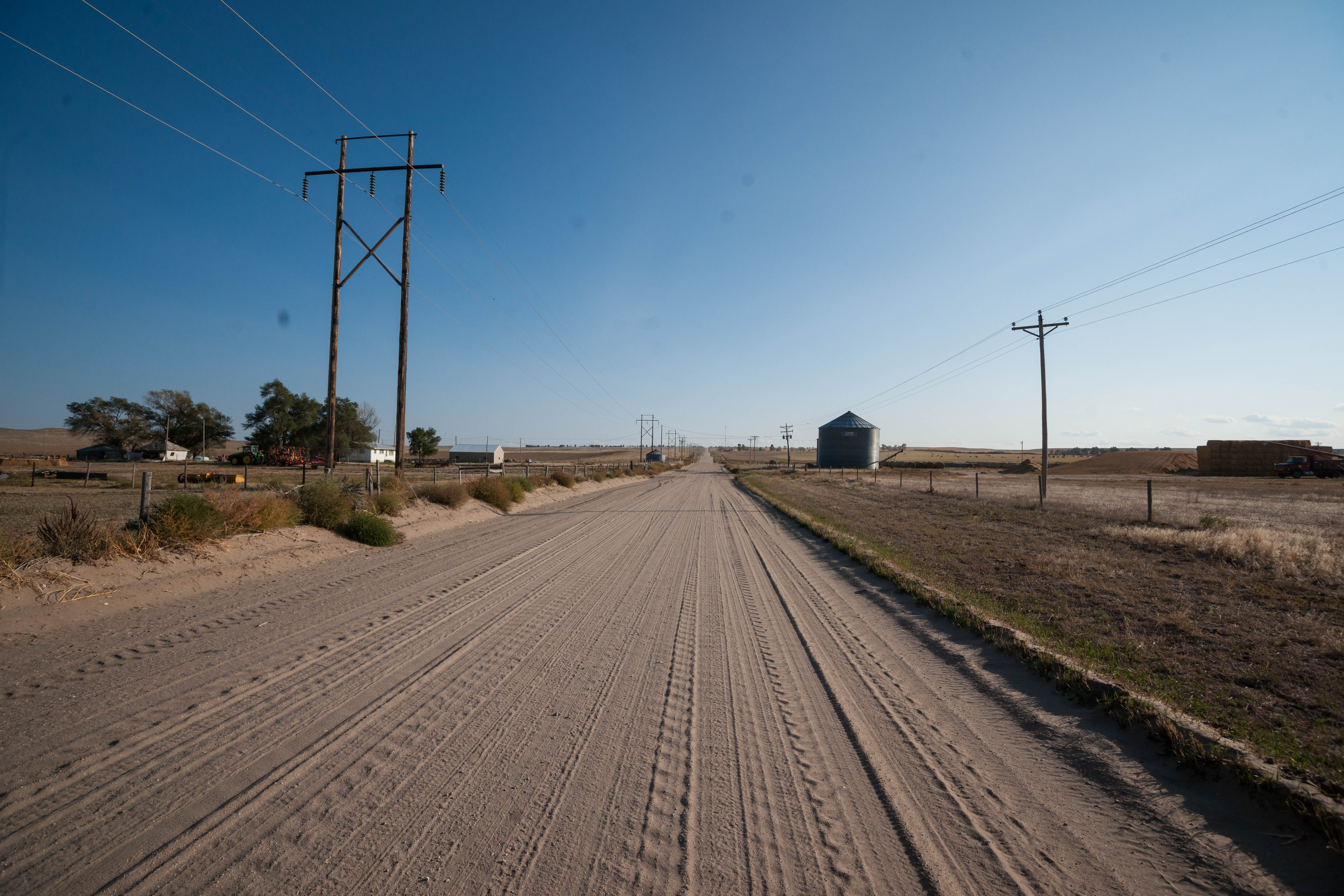
Lynn, Nebraska

Lynn is an unincorporated community in Morrill County, Nebraska, United States.

== History ==
A post office was established at Lynn in 1910, and was discontinued in 1923. Lynn was likely named after a pioneer settler.
