= Bonner, Nebraska =

Unincorporated community in Nebraska, United States

- Unincorporated community
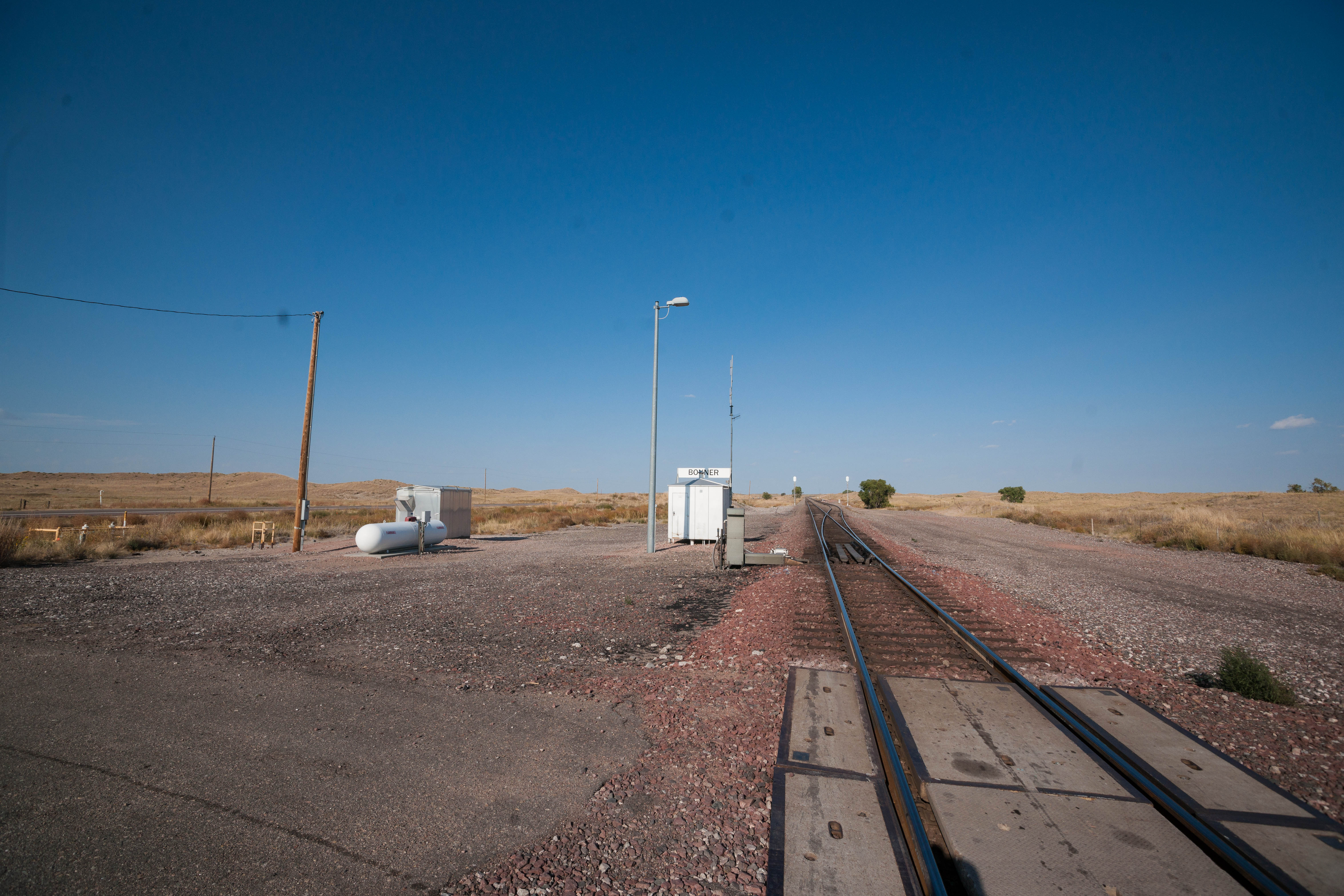

- Location within Nebraska Location within the United States
- Coordinates: 41.9°N 103°W
- Country: United States
- State: Nebraska
- County: Morrill

Bonner is an unincorporated community in Morrill County, Nebraska, United States.

== History ==
Bonner was located on the Chicago, Burlington and Quincy Railroad. The community was likely named for a settler.
