= Sidney, Nebraska =

- City
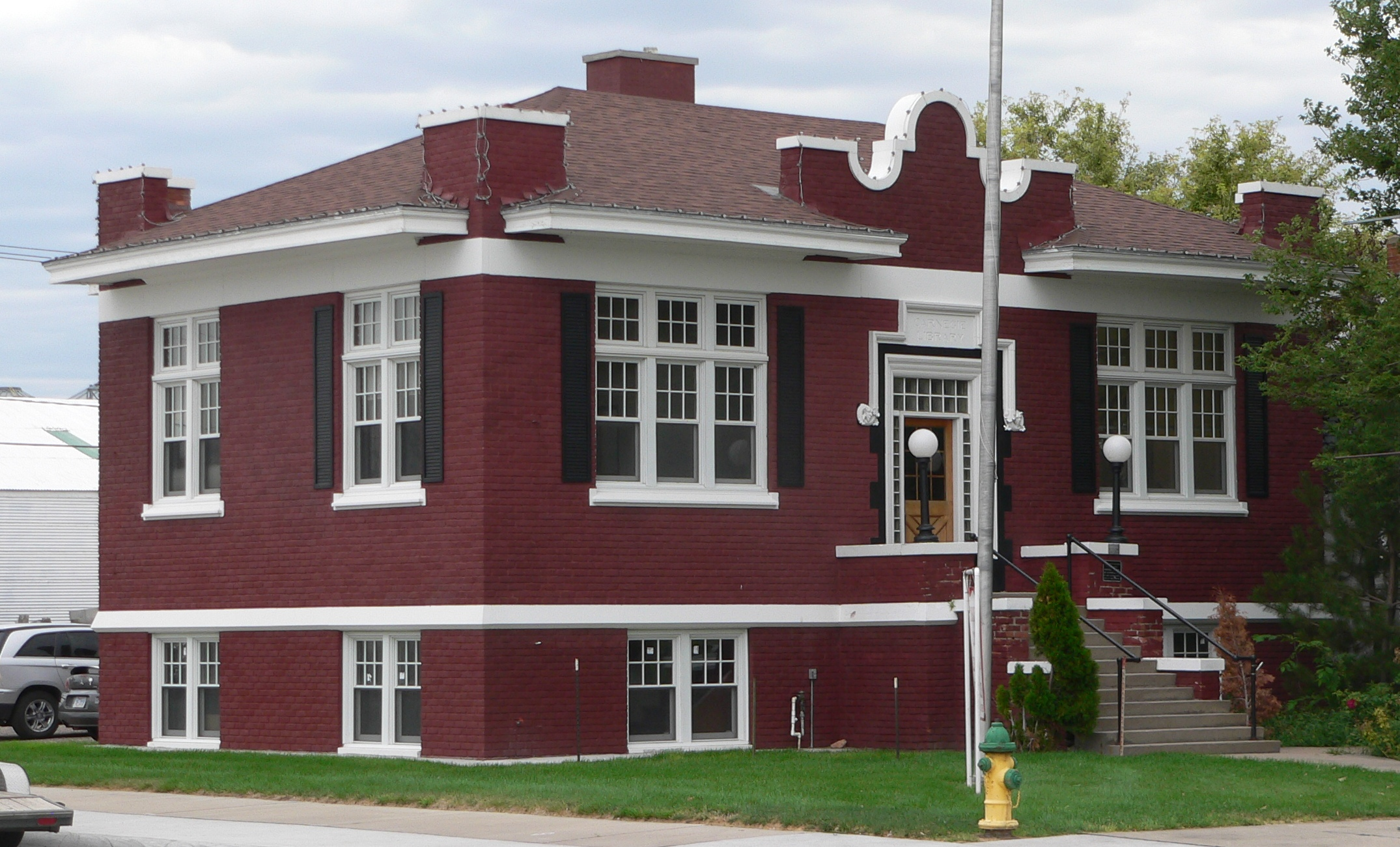
- Carnegie library

- Location within Cheyenne County and Nebraska
- Coordinates: 41°08′02″N 102°58′05″W
- Country: United States
- State: Nebraska
- County: Cheyenne

Government
  - Mayor: Brandon Bondegard
  - City Manager: Josh Hanson

Area
  - Total: 7.49 sq mi (19.39 km^{2})
  - Land: 7.48 sq mi (19.38 km^{2})
  - Water: 0 sq mi (0.00 km^{2})
- Elevation: 4,085 ft (1,245 m)

Population (2020)
  - Total: 6,410
  - Density: 856.38/sq mi (330.65/km^{2})
- Time zone: UTC−7 (Mountain (MST))
  - Summer (DST): UTC−6 (MDT)
- ZIP codes: 69160, 69162
- Area code: 308
- FIPS code: 31-45295
- GNIS feature ID: 2395883
- Website: cityofsidney.org

Sidney is a city in and the county seat of Cheyenne County, Nebraska, United States. The city is nine miles (14 km) north of the Colorado state line. The population was 6,410 at the 2020 census.

== History ==
The city was named for Sidney Dillon, president of the Union Pacific Railroad. It was founded in 1867 by the Union Pacific and grew up around the military base of Fort Sidney (also known as Sidney Barracks), where soldiers were stationed to guard the transcontinental railroad against potential Native American attacks.

The town became the southern terminus of the Sidney Black Hills Stage Road which used Clarke's Bridge (near Bridgeport, Nebraska) to allow military and civilian traffic to reach Fort Robinson, Red Cloud Agency, Spotted Tail Agency, Custer, South Dakota, and Deadwood, South Dakota in the late 1870s and 1880s.

When the railroad reached Sidney, it was the end of a sub-division of the rail line and played host to a roundhouse, repair facilities, and a railroad hotel for passengers.

Sidney is home to one of the Old West's Boot Hill cemeteries; many of those interred there were soldiers from the fort.

The former headquarters for Cabela's was located in Sidney until 2017, when Cabela’s was acquired by Bass Pro Shops. Approximately 2,000 jobs were eliminated, while about 120 were relocated to the Bass Pro Shops headquarters in Springfield, Missouri.

== Geography ==
According to the United States Census Bureau, the city has a total area of 6.93 square miles (17.95 km^{2}), all land.

Sidney is toward the western edge of the Midwestern wheat-growing region. West of the city, the land is increasingly used for cattle ranching. Sidney is located along Lodgepole Creek, which is along present-day Interstate 80.

The city is presently located at the junction of U.S. Route 385 with I-80, and its location approximately halfway between Cheyenne, Wyoming, and North Platte, Nebraska, has encouraged the growth of the city as a major transportation service area on the Interstate. Because the I-80/US 385 interchange is located several miles southeast of the town center, a new commercial area has developed, including truck stops, convenience stores, the building that housed Cabela's former world headquarters, shopping centers, motels, restaurants, and other commercial enterprises. In recent years, the city has seen further growth with the construction of wind farms in this portion of the Nebraska Panhandle and adjacent areas of Colorado, including Peetz.

== Demographics ==
Historical population
Census	Pop.	Note	%±
1880	1,069		—
1900	1,001		—
1910	1,185		18.4%
1920	2,852		140.7%
1930	3,306		15.9%
1940	3,388		2.5%
1950	4,912		45.0%
1960	8,004		62.9%
1970	6,403		−20.0%
1980	6,010		−6.1%
1990	5,959		−0.8%
2000	6,282		5.4%
2010	6,757		7.6%
2020	6,410		−5.1%
U.S. Decennial Census; 2012 Estimate

=== 2020 census ===
As of the 2020 census, Sidney had a population of 6,410 and 2,806 households. The median age was 39.6 years; 23.9% of residents were under the age of 18, and 19.7% were 65 years of age or older. For every 100 females there were 97.5 males, and for every 100 females age 18 and over there were 95.8 males age 18 and over.

The 2020 census also reported 1,489 families, and a population density of 855.8 per square mile (330.8/km^{2}). 97.2% of residents lived in urban areas, while 2.8% lived in rural areas.

Of the city's households, 28.6% had children under the age of 18 living in them. Of all households, 44.7% were married-couple households, 21.4% were households with a male householder and no spouse or partner present, and 27.7% were households with a female householder and no spouse or partner present. About 35.1% of all households were made up of individuals and 14.6% had someone living alone who was 65 years of age or older.

There were 3,210 housing units, of which 12.6% were vacant. The homeowner vacancy rate was 3.4% and the rental vacancy rate was 14.2%.

Racial composition as of the 2020 census
Race	Number	Percent
White	5,629	87.8%
Black or African American	54	0.8%
American Indian and Alaska Native	43	0.7%
Asian	75	1.2%
Native Hawaiian and Other Pacific Islander	1	0.0%
Some other race	246	3.8%
Two or more races	362	5.6%
Hispanic or Latino (of any race)	647	10.1%

=== Income and poverty ===
The 2016–2020 5-year American Community Survey estimates show that the median household income was $51,880 (with a margin of error of +/- $3,029) and the median family income $73,958 (+/- $12,225). Males had a median income of $43,238 (+/- $5,747) versus $30,992 (+/- $1,494) for females. The median income for those above 16 years old was $34,891 (+/- $3,207). Approximately, 4.6% of families and 10.3% of the population were below the poverty line, including 9.3% of those under the age of 18 and 13.3% of those ages 65 or over.

=== 2010 census ===
As of the census of 2010, there were 6,757 people, 2,893 households, and 1,764 families living in the city. The population density was 975.0 inhabitants per square mile (376.4/km^{2}). There were 3,184 housing units at an average density of 459.5 per square mile (177.4/km^{2}). The racial makeup of the city was 92.3% White, 0.2% African American, 0.8% Native American, 2.3% Asian, 0.1% Pacific Islander, 2.7% from other races, and 1.5% from two or more races. Hispanic or Latino of any race were 7.4% of the population.

There were 2,893 households, of which 30.9% had children under the age of 18 living with them, 47.3% were married couples living together, 9.7% had a female householder with no husband present, 3.9% had a male householder with no wife present, and 39.0% were non-families. 33.4% of all households were made up of individuals, and 12.3% had someone living alone who was 65 years of age or older. The average household size was 2.30 and the average family size was 2.95.

The median age in the city was 37.1 years. 25.1% of residents were under the age of 18; 7% were between the ages of 18 and 24; 27.4% were from 25 to 44; 25% were from 45 to 64; and 15.3% were 65 years of age or older. The gender makeup of the city was 48.5% male and 51.5% female.

=== 2000 census ===
As of the census of 2000, there were 6,282 people, 2,621 households, and 1,672 families living in the city. The population density was 1,018.5 inhabitants per square mile (393.2/km^{2}). There were 2,890 housing units at an average density of 468.5 per square mile (180.9/km^{2}). The racial makeup of the city was 95.22% White, 0.18% African American, 0.76% Native American, 0.56% Asian, 0.05% Pacific Islander, 2.07% from other races, and 1.16% from two or more races. Hispanic or Latino of any race were 5.91% of the population.

There were 2,621 households, out of which 31.0% had children under the age of 18 living with them, 51.5% were married couples living together, 9.3% had a female householder with no husband present, and 36.2% were non-families. 31.5% of all households were made up of individuals, and 13.3% had someone living alone who was 65 years of age or older. The average household size was 2.35 and the average family size was 2.96.

In the city, the population was spread out, with 26.2% under the age of 18, 7.7% from 18 to 24, 27.3% from 25 to 44, 21.7% from 45 to 64, and 17.2% who were 65 years of age or older. The median age was 38 years. For every 100 females, there were 91.8 males. For every 100 females age 18 and over, there were 88.0 males.

As of 2000 the median income for a household in the city was $33,935, and the median income for a family was $41,050. Males had a median income of $30,286 versus $20,000 for females. The per capita income for the city was $17,158. About 7.0% of families and 9.0% of the population were below the poverty line, including 10.2% of those under age 18 and 5.7% of those age 65 or over.

== Climate ==
Sidney has a cool semi-arid climate (Köppen BSk), bordering on a humid continental climate (Dwa/Dfa). Winters are cold and dry, while summers are hot and wetter. Precipitation is greatest in the summer months, with an annual average of 16.84 in (428 mm)

Climate data for Sidney 6 NNW, Nebraska (1991–2020 normals, extremes 1927–present)
Month	Jan	Feb	Mar	Apr	May	Jun	Jul	Aug	Sep	Oct	Nov	Dec	Year
Record high °F (°C)	74 (23)	78 (26)	85 (29)	96 (36)	97 (36)	110 (43)	109 (43)	106 (41)	110 (43)	94 (34)	81 (27)	80 (27)	110 (43)
Mean maximum °F (°C)	61.4 (16.3)	65.0 (18.3)	74.9 (23.8)	80.9 (27.2)	88.2 (31.2)	95.5 (35.3)	100.1 (37.8)	98.3 (36.8)	93.8 (34.3)	84.5 (29.2)	72.7 (22.6)	63.0 (17.2)	101.6 (38.7)
Mean daily maximum °F (°C)	40.8 (4.9)	42.8 (6.0)	52.6 (11.4)	59.5 (15.3)	69.0 (20.6)	81.2 (27.3)	88.4 (31.3)	86.0 (30.0)	78.0 (25.6)	63.5 (17.5)	50.8 (10.4)	41.4 (5.2)	62.8 (17.1)
Daily mean °F (°C)	28.8 (−1.8)	30.7 (−0.7)	39.3 (4.1)	46.3 (7.9)	56.1 (13.4)	67.2 (19.6)	73.9 (23.3)	71.6 (22.0)	63.1 (17.3)	49.3 (9.6)	37.7 (3.2)	29.3 (−1.5)	49.4 (9.7)
Mean daily minimum °F (°C)	16.8 (−8.4)	18.6 (−7.4)	26.1 (−3.3)	33.0 (0.6)	43.2 (6.2)	53.1 (11.7)	59.4 (15.2)	57.2 (14.0)	48.2 (9.0)	35.2 (1.8)	24.7 (−4.1)	17.2 (−8.2)	36.1 (2.3)
Mean minimum °F (°C)	−4.9 (−20.5)	−2.5 (−19.2)	6.4 (−14.2)	16.1 (−8.8)	26.8 (−2.9)	40.3 (4.6)	49.0 (9.4)	46.4 (8.0)	32.8 (0.4)	15.9 (−8.9)	4.4 (−15.3)	−3.1 (−19.5)	−11.3 (−24.1)
Record low °F (°C)	−33 (−36)	−30 (−34)	−27 (−33)	−7 (−22)	15 (−9)	29 (−2)	36 (2)	35 (2)	13 (−11)	−2 (−19)	−19 (−28)	−39 (−39)	−39 (−39)
Average precipitation inches (mm)	0.30 (7.6)	0.50 (13)	0.95 (24)	1.88 (48)	3.00 (76)	3.15 (80)	2.60 (66)	2.11 (54)	1.65 (42)	1.15 (29)	0.51 (13)	0.44 (11)	18.24 (463)
Average snowfall inches (cm)	3.8 (9.7)	4.9 (12)	4.3 (11)	3.2 (8.1)	0.7 (1.8)	0.0 (0.0)	0.0 (0.0)	0.0 (0.0)	0.1 (0.25)	2.4 (6.1)	3.7 (9.4)	5.7 (14)	28.8 (73)
Average extreme snow depth inches (cm)	2 (5.1)	3 (7.6)	2 (5.1)	2 (5.1)	1 (2.5)	0 (0)	0 (0)	0 (0)	0 (0)	1 (2.5)	2 (5.1)	3 (7.6)	3 (7.6)
Average precipitation days (≥ 0.01 in)	2.4	3.5	4.4	5.9	8.6	8.4	7.3	5.9	5.0	4.5	2.6	2.2	60.7
Average snowy days (≥ 0.1 in)	2.0	2.4	1.7	1.0	0.2	0.0	0.0	0.0	0.0	0.8	1.5	1.9	11.5
Source: NOAA

== Points of interest ==
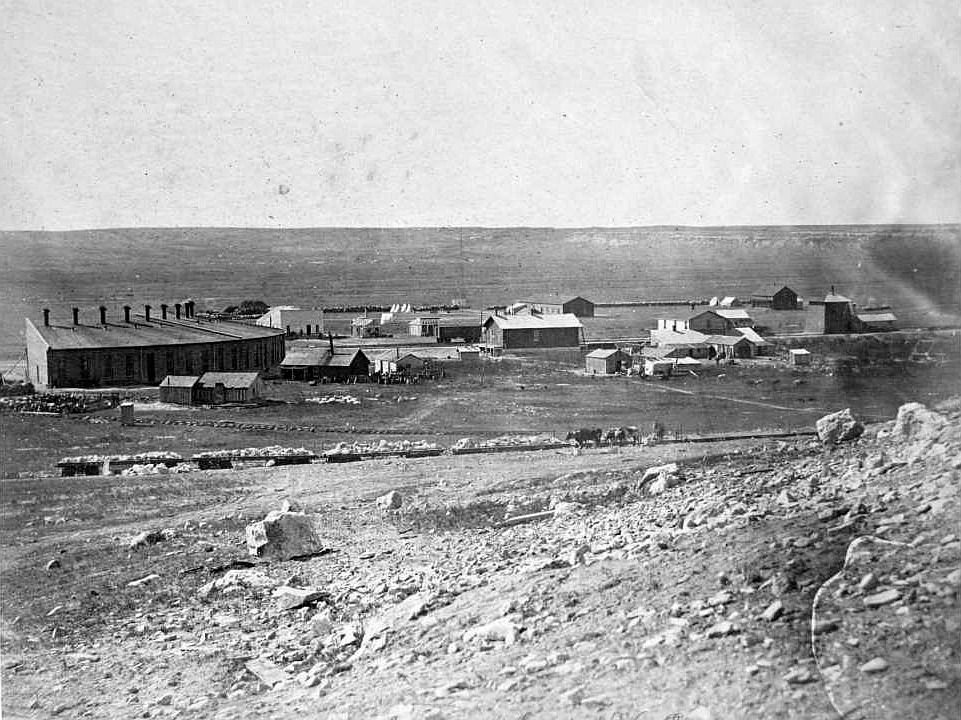
Sidney, 1868

- Historic Fort Sidney

== Transportation ==
The Sidney Stage Line operates Monday-Saturday, with 12 stops on a deviated-fixed route throughout the city.

== Communications ==
On November 13, 1984, The Bell Systems ended the era of America's toll cord switchboards when the Sidney office closed.

== Notable people ==
- John L. DeWitt, US Army general, known for his vocal support of the internment of Japanese-Americans and his role supervising the combat operations in the Aleutian Islands
- Rod Horn, professional football player for the Cincinnati Bengals
- Harry Northup, actor (Over the Edge) and poet
- Ken Ramos, baseball player
- Luke Short, gunfighter
- Dan Chaon, writer
