= Schuetz Log Cabin =

Historic house in Nebraska, United States

- U.S. National Register of Historic Places
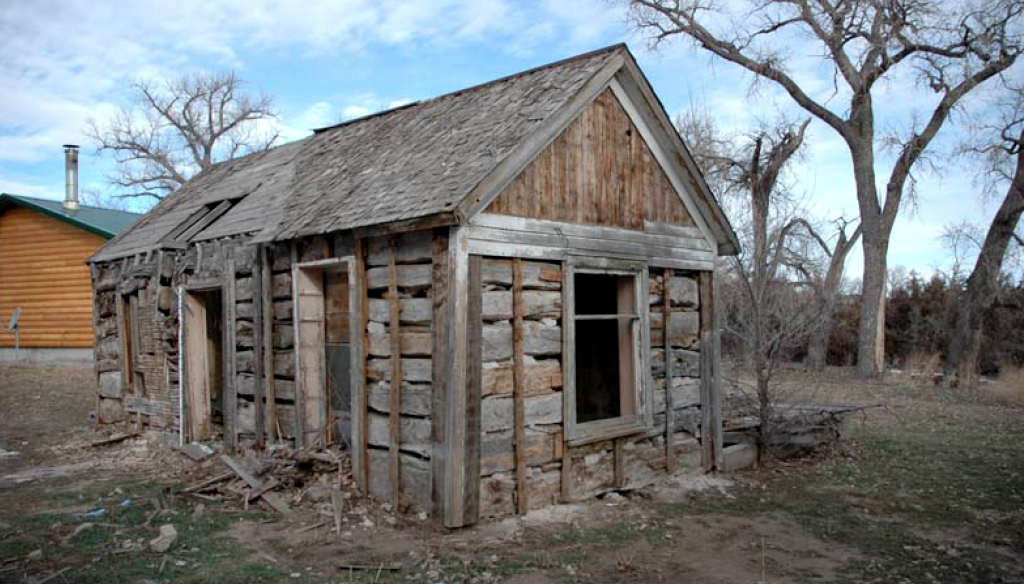

- Location within Nebraska Location within the United States
- Location: HC 82 Box 103, vicinity of Dalton, Nebraska
- Coordinates: 41°29′57″N 103°5′17″W
- Architectural style: Log cabin
- NRHP reference No.: 11000105
- Added to NRHP: March 21, 2011

The Schuetz Log Cabin, near Dalton, Nebraska, is a historic log cabin that was listed on the National Register of Historic Places in 2011.

== History ==
It was built sometime between 1900 and 1920 and was deemed significant in the local area "for architecture as an excellent example of log construction in Morrill County, Nebraska." As of its NRHP nomination date in 2011, the cabin was in "fair" condition and "its core character defining features" were being revealed in rehabilitation in progress.

It was built on the homestead of Louie Schuetz, who claimed 160 acres (65 ha) of land under the Homestead Act in 1890, after finding the site while hunting. Its attraction was that it had water. His property grew to 880 acres (360 ha) and his wife, Margaret Jane Hughes, had 160 acres more. After they married in 1891, they built and lived in, in succession, a sod house, then a native stone house, then the surviving log cabin, and later a frame house.
