= Atkins, Nebraska =

Unincorporated community in Nebraska, United States

- Unincorporated community
- Location within Nebraska Location within the United States
- Coordinates: 41°43′26″N 103°12′55″W
- Country: United States
- State: Nebraska
- County: Morrill

Atkins is an unincorporated community in Morrill County, Nebraska, United States.

== History ==
Atkins was a station on the Chicago, Burlington and Quincy Railroad. The community was named for Col. A. W. Atkins.
