= Redington, Nebraska =

- Unincorporated community
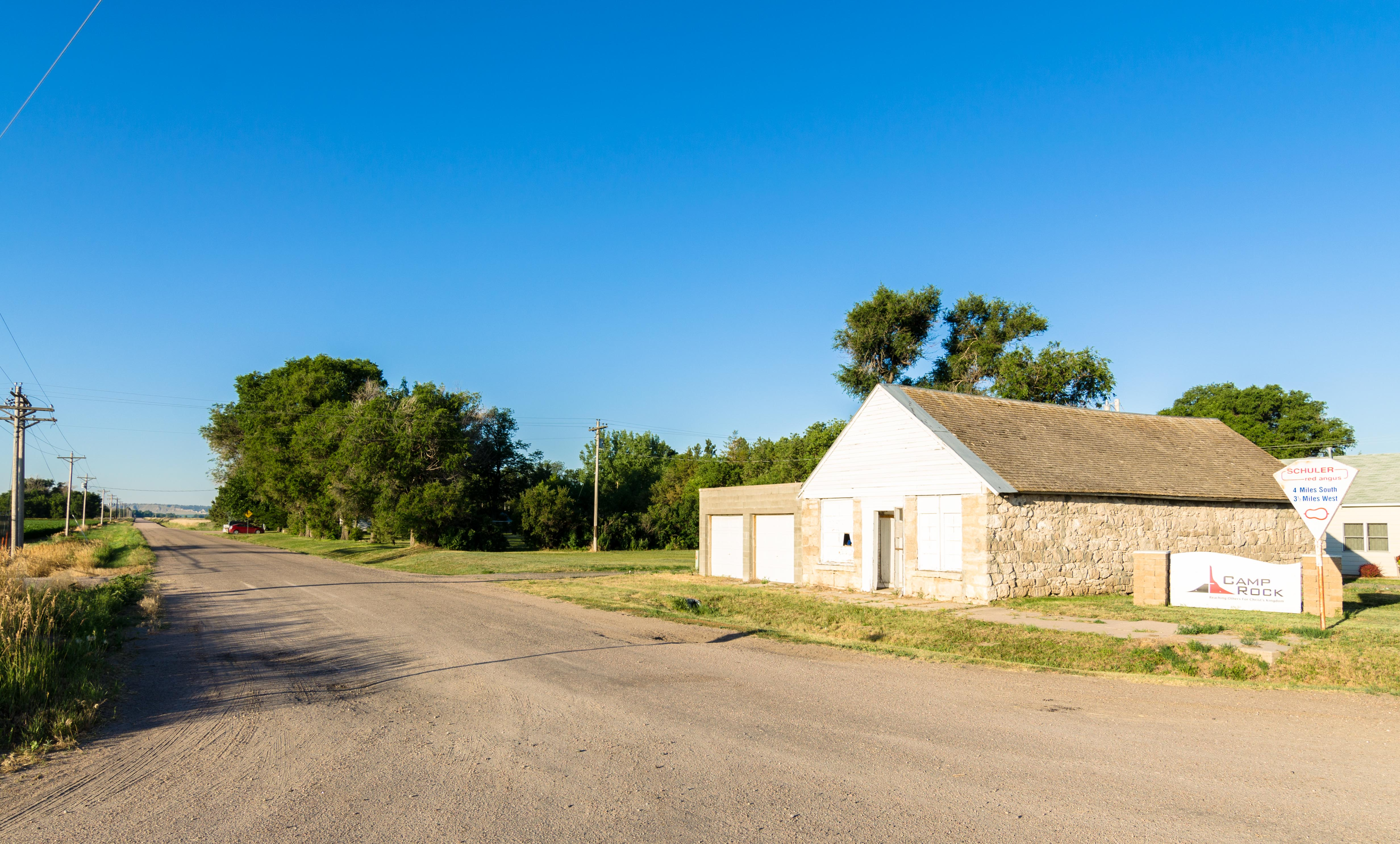

- Location within the state of Nebraska
- Coordinates: 41°35′02″N 103°16′23″W
- Country: United States
- State: Nebraska
- County: Morrill
- Elevation: 3,891 ft (1,186 m)
- Time zone: UTC-7 (Mountain (MST))
  - Summer (DST): UTC-6 (MDT)
- ZIP code: 69336
- FIPS code: 31-40950
- GNIS feature ID: 832506

Redington is an unincorporated community in Morrill County, Nebraska, United States.

== History ==
A post office was established at Redington in 1886, and remained in operation until it was discontinued in 1962. The community was named for Henry V. Redington, a pioneer.
