= Angora, Nebraska =

Unincorporated community in Nebraska, United States

- Unincorporated community
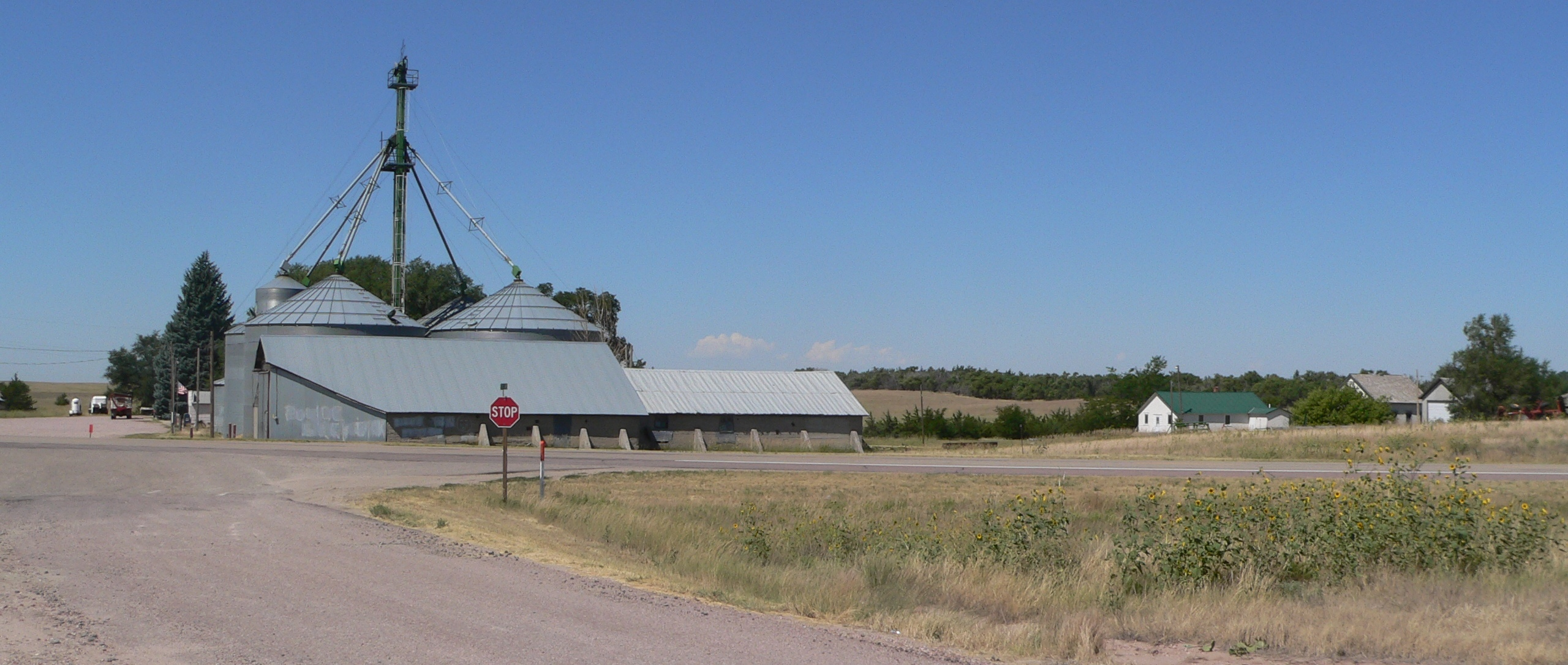
- Angora, seen from the east across U.S. Highway 385

- Location within the state of Nebraska Angora (the United States)
- Coordinates: 41°51′04″N 103°07′33″W
- Country: United States
- State: Nebraska
- County: Morrill
- Elevation: 4,265 ft (1,300 m)
- Time zone: UTC-7 (Mountain (MST))
  - Summer (DST): UTC-6 (MDT)
- ZIP code: 69331
- Area code: 308

Angora (also Antelope Hill) is an unincorporated community in northern Morrill County, Nebraska, United States. It lies along U.S. Route 385, north of the city of Bridgeport, the county seat of Morrill County. The community was established in 1900 by the Chicago, Burlington, and Quincy Railroad; it was named for the Turkish city of Ankara, which was then known as Angora. The Angora post office was established in 1901, and it remains open with the assigned ZIP code of 69331.

== Climate ==
According to the Köppen climate classification, Angora has a semiarid climate, BSk on climate maps.
