= Vance, Nebraska =

Unincorporated community in Nebraska, U.S.

Coordinates: 41°46′38″N 103°06′48″W

Vance is an unincorporated community in Morrill County, Nebraska, United States.

== History ==
Vance was located on the Chicago, Burlington and Quincy Railroad.
