= Northport, Nebraska =

Unincorporated community in Nebraska, U.S.

Coordinates: 41°40′56″N 103°05′15″W

Northport is an unincorporated community in Morrill County, Nebraska, United States.

== History ==
Northport was connected to The Burlington route in 1900 when the CB&Q built a branch from Alliance, Nebraska. A post office was established at Northport in 1910, and remained in operation until it was discontinued in 1975. Northport was named from its location on the north bank of the North Platte River.
