= Sidney-Black Hills Trail =

The Sidney Black Hills Stage Road or Route was a trail connecting Sidney, Nebraska, Sidney Barracks, and the Union Pacific Railroad with Fort Robinson, Red Cloud Agency, Spotted Tail Agency, Custer City, Dakota Territory, and Deadwood, Dakota Territory between 1876 and 1887, when it was replaced.

It competed with the Cheyenne Black Hills Stage Route to supply the gold mining fields of the Black Hills prior to the construction of the Cowboy Line railroad in Northern Nebraska in 1887, which linked the Black Hills by rail to the rest of the world.

The trail went north from Sidney past Courthouse and Jail Rocks to present-day Bridgeport, Nebraska where it crossed the North Platte River via the Clarke Bridge to present-day Northport, Nebraska, Red Willow, Running Water (on the Niobrara River), Red Cloud Agency, and eventually on two separate branches; one to Deadwood and one via Four Mile to Custer City.
