= Lodgepole Creek =

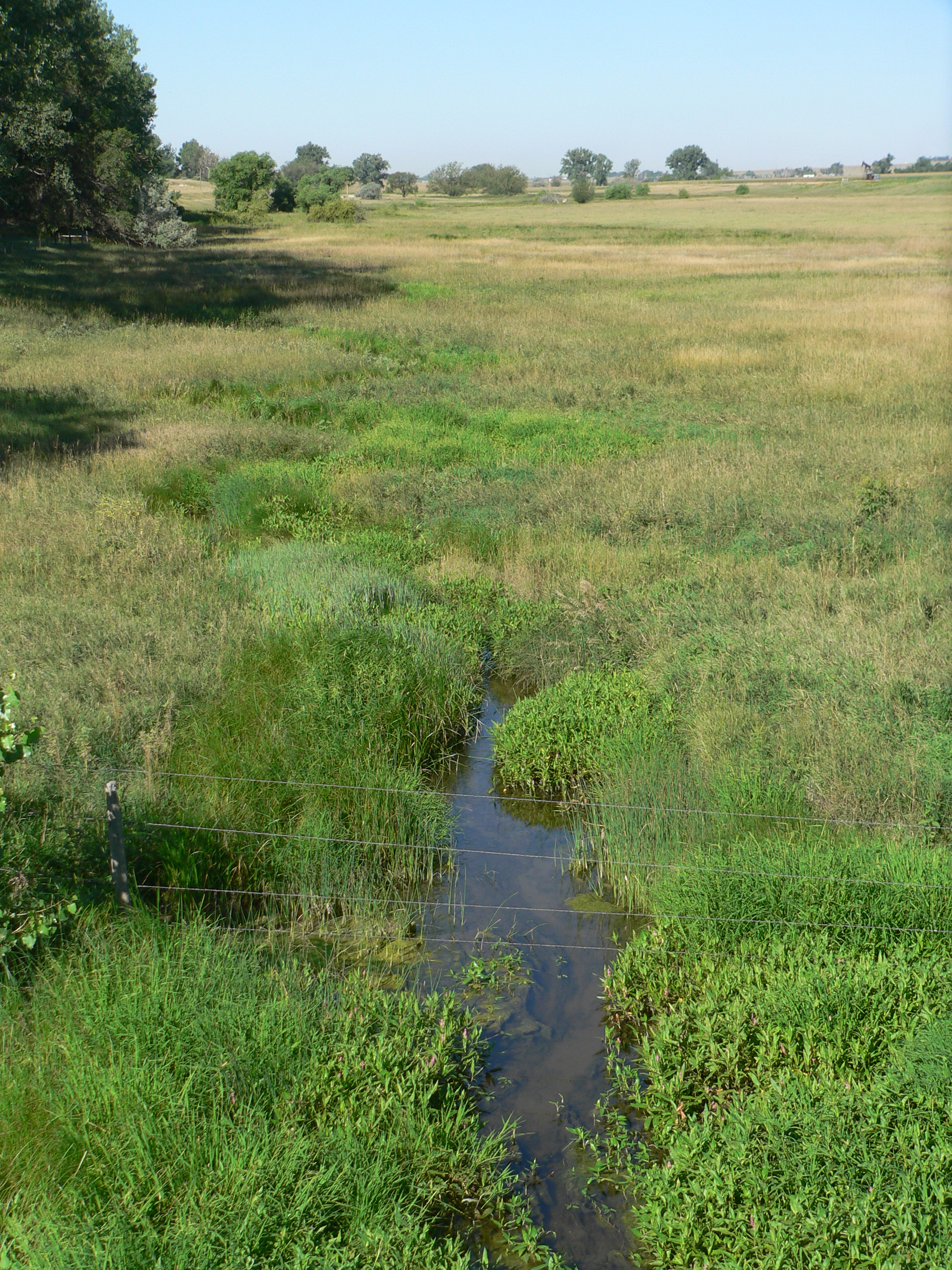
- Lodgepole Creek north of Kimball, Nebraska

Physical characteristics
- Source
  - coordinates: 41°19′17″N 105°11′57″W
- Mouth
  - location: Confluence with South Platte River
  - coordinates: 40°57′18″N 102°23′04″W
  - elevation: 3,517 ft (1,072 m)
- Length: 278 mi (447 km)

Basin features
- Progression: South Platte—Platte—Missouri—Mississippi

Lodgepole Creek is a tributary of the South Platte River, approximately 278 miles (447 km) long, in the U.S. states of Wyoming, Nebraska and Colorado. Lodgepole Creek drains a basin in the interior of a low plateau which lies between the South Platte Basin and the North Platte Basin in the southeastern corner of Wyoming, the southern edge of the Nebraska Panhandle and several small portions of northeastern Colorado. As its name implies, Lodgepole Creek is a very small stream; for nearly all of its length it flows through the semiarid High Plains. The Lodgepole Creek Valley has been a major transportation route for over 100 years; the line of the original transcontinental railroad, the Lincoln Highway/U.S. Highway 30 and Interstate 80 all run along the stream for much of its length.

== Description ==
Lodgepole Creek rises on the east slope of the Laramie Mountains of southeastern Wyoming, about 10 miles (16 km) east of Laramie, Wyoming. The creek flows east, north of Cheyenne; it enters Nebraska just east of Pine Bluffs, Wyoming. In Nebraska, it flows to the east past Kimball, Sidney and Chappell; at Chappell, Lodgepole Creek turns to the southeast and flows into Colorado. The stream, by this point flowing south, empties into the South Platte River at Ovid, 3 miles (5 km) south of the Nebraska/Colorado border.

== Early irrigation ==
According to a 1921 history of the Nebraska Panhandle, the first irrigation in that part of the state took place in the Lodgepole valley in 1871. A dam was built across the creek at Fort Sidney and used to provide water for crops raised by the post's soldiers. As more settlers moved into the valley, dams and ditches proliferated throughout the valley; according to the 1921 history, downstream flow was maintained by the narrowness of the valley and the fact that the creek was fed by springs along its entire length.

== See also ==
- List of rivers of Colorado
- List of rivers of Nebraska
- List of rivers of Wyoming
