= Morrill County, Nebraska =

County in Nebraska, United States

- County
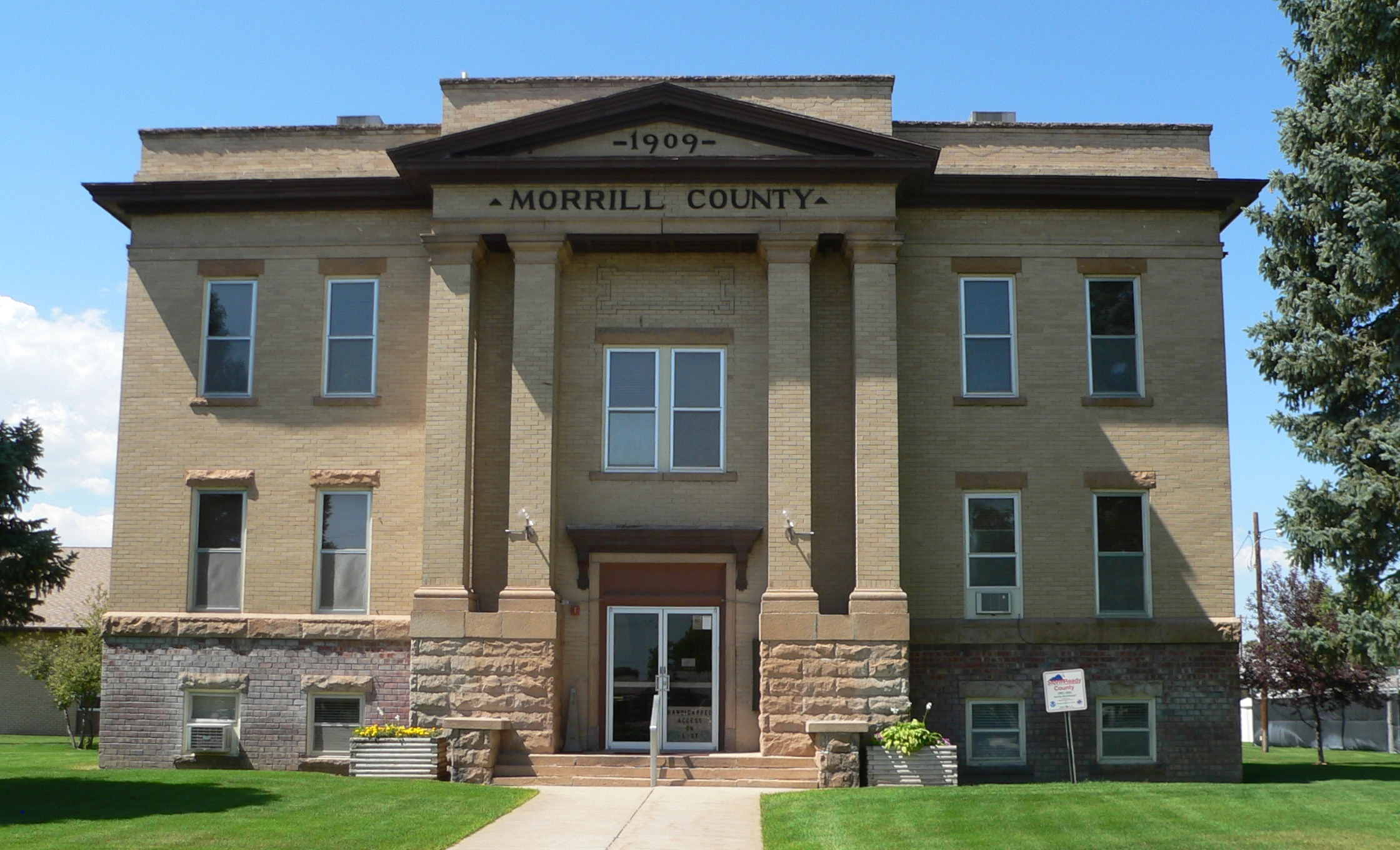
- Morrill County Courthouse in Bridgeport

- Location within the U.S. state of Nebraska
- Coordinates: 41°41′N 103°01′W
- Country: United States
- State: Nebraska
- Founded: 1908
- Named for: Charles Henry Morrill
- Seat: Bridgeport
- Largest city: Bridgeport

Area
  - Total: 1,430 sq mi (3,700 km^{2})
  - Land: 1,424 sq mi (3,690 km^{2})
  - Water: 6.0 sq mi (16 km^{2}) 0.4%

Population (2020)
  - Total: 4,555
  - Estimate (2025): 4,404 ▼
  - Density: 3.199/sq mi (1.235/km^{2})
- Time zone: UTC−7 (Mountain)
  - Summer (DST): UTC−6 (MDT)
- Congressional district: 3rd
- Website: www.morrillcountyne.gov

Morrill County is a county in the U.S. state of Nebraska. As of the 2020 United States census, the population was 4,555. Its county seat is Bridgeport.

In the Nebraska license plate system, Morrill County is represented by the prefix 64 (it had the 64th-largest number of vehicles registered in the state when the license plate system was established in 1922).

== History ==
The Battle of Mud Springs and the Battle of Rush Creek between the US Army and Cheyenne, Lakota Sioux, and Arapaho occurred in 1865 within what would become Morrill County.

On November 3, 1908, voters in Cheyenne County passed a measure calling for the division of that county. Accordingly, the Nebraska State Legislature passed an act providing for the division of Cheyenne County, the line of division running east–west, south of the town of Bridgeport. The northern portion so divided was to be called Morrill County. In December of that year, another election determined Bridgeport to be the seat of the new county, and the new county's officials were determined. The county was named for Charles Henry Morrill, a president of the Lincoln Land Company.

== Geography ==
The terrain of Morrill County consists of low rolling hills. A portion of the area is used for agriculture, including some center pivot irrigation. The North Platte River flows east-southeastward through the south-central part of the county, passing Bridgeport before exiting the county some 4 mi (6.4 km) above the southeast county corner. The county has a total area of 1,430 square miles (3,700 km^{2}), of which 1,424 square miles (3,690 km^{2}) are land and 6.0 square miles (16 km^{2}) (0.4%) are covered by water.

Chimney Rock, a rock formation 325 feet (99 m) tall with a 120-foot (37 m) spire, lies about 4 mi (6.4 km) south of Bayard, in western Morrill County. The rock was a prominent landmark on the Oregon Trail, and has become a symbol of Nebraska, appearing on the state's license plates and on its commemorative quarter.

=== Adjacent counties ===
- Box Butte County – north
- Sheridan County – northeast
- Garden County – east
- Cheyenne County – south
- Banner County – southwest
- Scotts Bluff County – northwest

=== Main highways ===
- US 385 - runs north and south through the county
- US 26 – runs northwest–southeast along the north side of the North Platte River
- Nebraska Highway 92– runs southeast from the western border to its intersection with US 26 near Broadwater
- Nebraska Highway 88 - runs east from a point north of the southwest corner of the county; turns north to its intersection with US 385 in Bridgeport

== Demographics ==
Historical population
Census	Pop.	Note	%±
1910	4,584		—
1920	9,151		99.6%
1930	9,950		8.7%
1940	9,436		−5.2%
1950	8,263		−12.4%
1960	7,057		−14.6%
1970	5,813		−17.6%
1980	6,085		4.7%
1990	5,423		−10.9%
2000	5,440		0.3%
2010	5,042		−7.3%
2020	4,555		−9.7%
2025 (est.)	4,404	▼	−3.3%
US Decennial Census; 1790-1960 1900-1990; 1990-2000 2010 2020 2022

=== 2020 census ===
As of the 2020 census, the county had a population of 4,555. The median age was 44.0 years. 22.2% of residents were under the age of 18 and 23.6% of residents were 65 years of age or older. For every 100 females there were 102.0 males, and for every 100 females age 18 and over there were 100.6 males age 18 and over.

The racial makeup of the county was 85.4% White, 0.4% Black or African American, 1.2% American Indian and Alaska Native, 0.5% Asian, 0.0% Native Hawaiian and Pacific Islander, 5.5% from some other race, and 7.0% from two or more races. Hispanic or Latino residents of any race comprised 14.2% of the population.

0.0% of residents lived in urban areas, while 100.0% lived in rural areas.

There were 1,905 households in the county, of which 28.3% had children under the age of 18 living with them and 22.9% had a female householder with no spouse or partner present. About 31.2% of all households were made up of individuals and 16.3% had someone living alone who was 65 years of age or older.

There were 2,272 housing units, of which 16.2% were vacant. Among occupied housing units, 72.1% were owner-occupied and 27.9% were renter-occupied. The homeowner vacancy rate was 1.8% and the rental vacancy rate was 8.7%.

=== 2000 census ===
As of the 2000 United States census, 5,440 people, 2,138 households, and 1,494 families resided in the county. The population density was 4 people per square mile (1.5 people/km^{2}). There were 2,460 housing units averaged 2 units per square mile (0.77 units/km^{2}). The racial makeup of the county was 93.68% White, 0.07% African American, 0.72% Native American, 0.22% Asian, 4.12% from other races, and 1.19% from two or more races. About 10.09% of the population was Hispanic or Latino of any race. The people were about 40.5% German, 9.2% English, 7.3% Irish, and 6.7% American ancestry.

Of the 2,138 households, 32.10% had children under the age of 18 living with them, 59.50% were married couples living together, 6.50% had a female householder with no husband present, and 30.10% were not families. About 26.90% of all households were made up of individuals, and 13.00% had someone living alone who was 65 years of age or older. The average household size was 2.49 and the average family size was 3.03.

The county population was distributed as 27.20% under the age of 18, 7.20% from 18 to 24, 24.40% from 25 to 44, 24.20% from 45 to 64, and 17.00% who were 65 years of age or older. The median age was 40 years. For every 100 females, there were 97.90 males. For every 100 females age 18 and over, there were 95.60 males.

The median income for a household in the county was $30,235, and for a family was $36,673. Males had a median income of $27,107 versus $19,271 for females. The per capita income for the county was $14,725. About 10.00% of families and 14.70% of the population were below the poverty line, including 20.00% of those under age 18 and 10.30% of those age 65 or over.

== Communities ==
=== Cities ===
- Bayard
- Bridgeport

=== Village ===
- Broadwater

=== Unincorporated communities ===
- Angora
- Atkins
- Bonner
- Lynn
- Moomaw Corner
- Northport
- Redington
- Vance

=== Former Communities ===
- Alden
- Chimney Rock
- Finley
- Goodstreak
- Hickory
- Kelly
- Kuhn
- Riley
- Simla

== Law enforcement ==
Morrill County Sheriff's Office
- Patch of Morrill County Sheriff's Office
- Abbreviation: MCSO

Jurisdictional structure
- Operations jurisdiction: Morrill County, Nebraska, United States
- Legal jurisdiction: Morrill County, Nebraska

Operational structure
- Headquarters: 6th & L St., Bridgeport, Nebraska 69336
- Agency executive: Milo Cardenas (since 2010), Sheriff

Website
- Official website

In 2008 the sheriff's office employed four officers and five civilians.

The Humane Society of the United States awarded Sheriff Johyn D. Edens the 2009 Humane Law Enforcement Award for his investigation of mistreatment of 200 mustangs on an animal sanctuary. The owner of the Three Strikes Ranch, Jason Meduna, was sentenced to two consecutive 20-60 month terms, by Judge Leo Dobrovolny at the Morrill County Courthouse.

In the May 13, 2010, Republican primary, Milo Cardenas and Travis Petersen, polled 379 votes each (there being no Democratic candidate), and the decision was due to be made between then by a game of chance such as a coin flip, subject only to a recount. After two recounts, Morrill County Clerk, Kathy Brandt offered the candidates the choice to "either cut a card or have their names pulled out of a hat", cards were selected and the election board shuffled the deck seven times before spreading the cards on the table for a simultaneous draw. Brandt said "Cardenas and Petersen both drew at the same time. Milo, drew a nine of hearts and Petersen drew a six of spades." Thus Cardenas went forward to the final ballot, scheduled for November 2010, with no other registered candidates.

== Politics and government ==
Morrill County is in Nebraska's Nebraska's 3rd congressional district. As of 2017, it was represented in the US House of Representatives by Adrian Smith, a member of the Republican Party. As of 2017, the county was part of the state's 47th legislative district, and was represented in the Nebraska Legislature by Steve Erdman; Erdman is a member of the Republican Party, though the legislature is officially nonpartisan.

As of late 2016, 3314 registered voters were in Morrill County. Of these, 2175, or 65.6%, were Republicans; 591, or 17.8%, were Democrats; 522, or 15.8%, registered no political party; and 26, or 0.8%, were Libertarians.

Morrill County voters are reliably Republican in national politics. In no national election since 1936 has the county selected the Democratic Party candidate (as of 2024).

United States presidential election results for Morrill County, Nebraska
Year	Republican		Democratic		Third party(ies)	
Year	No.	%	No.	%	No.	%
1912	227	20.30%	391	34.97%	500	44.72%
1916	470	32.91%	888	62.18%	70	4.90%
1920	1,366	65.52%	667	31.99%	52	2.49%
1924	1,153	45.77%	734	29.14%	632	25.09%
1928	2,318	74.27%	765	24.51%	38	1.22%
1932	1,406	40.45%	2,008	57.77%	62	1.78%
1936	1,354	39.78%	1,999	58.73%	51	1.50%
1940	2,214	60.08%	1,471	39.92%	0	0.00%
1944	1,998	64.33%	1,108	35.67%	0	0.00%
1948	1,478	52.82%	1,320	47.18%	0	0.00%
1952	2,485	73.48%	897	26.52%	0	0.00%
1956	1,810	63.75%	1,029	36.25%	0	0.00%
1960	2,020	62.75%	1,199	37.25%	0	0.00%
1964	1,649	57.32%	1,228	42.68%	0	0.00%
1968	1,516	66.46%	480	21.04%	285	12.49%
1972	1,740	76.99%	520	23.01%	0	0.00%
1976	1,351	56.79%	971	40.82%	57	2.40%
1980	1,893	74.53%	512	20.16%	135	5.31%
1984	1,888	79.80%	464	19.61%	14	0.59%
1988	1,556	66.75%	754	32.35%	21	0.90%
1992	1,185	46.89%	577	22.83%	765	30.27%
1996	1,296	58.86%	620	28.16%	286	12.99%
2000	1,597	74.70%	460	21.52%	81	3.79%
2004	1,755	76.54%	495	21.59%	43	1.88%
2008	1,725	73.37%	557	23.69%	69	2.93%
2012	1,681	76.76%	455	20.78%	54	2.47%
2016	1,802	81.58%	284	12.86%	123	5.57%
2020	2,113	82.60%	386	15.09%	59	2.31%
2024	2,026	83.37%	366	15.06%	38	1.56%

== See also ==
- National Register of Historic Places listings in Morrill County, Nebraska
- Morrill County Sheriff's Office (Nebraska)
