= Bridgeport, Nebraska =

- City
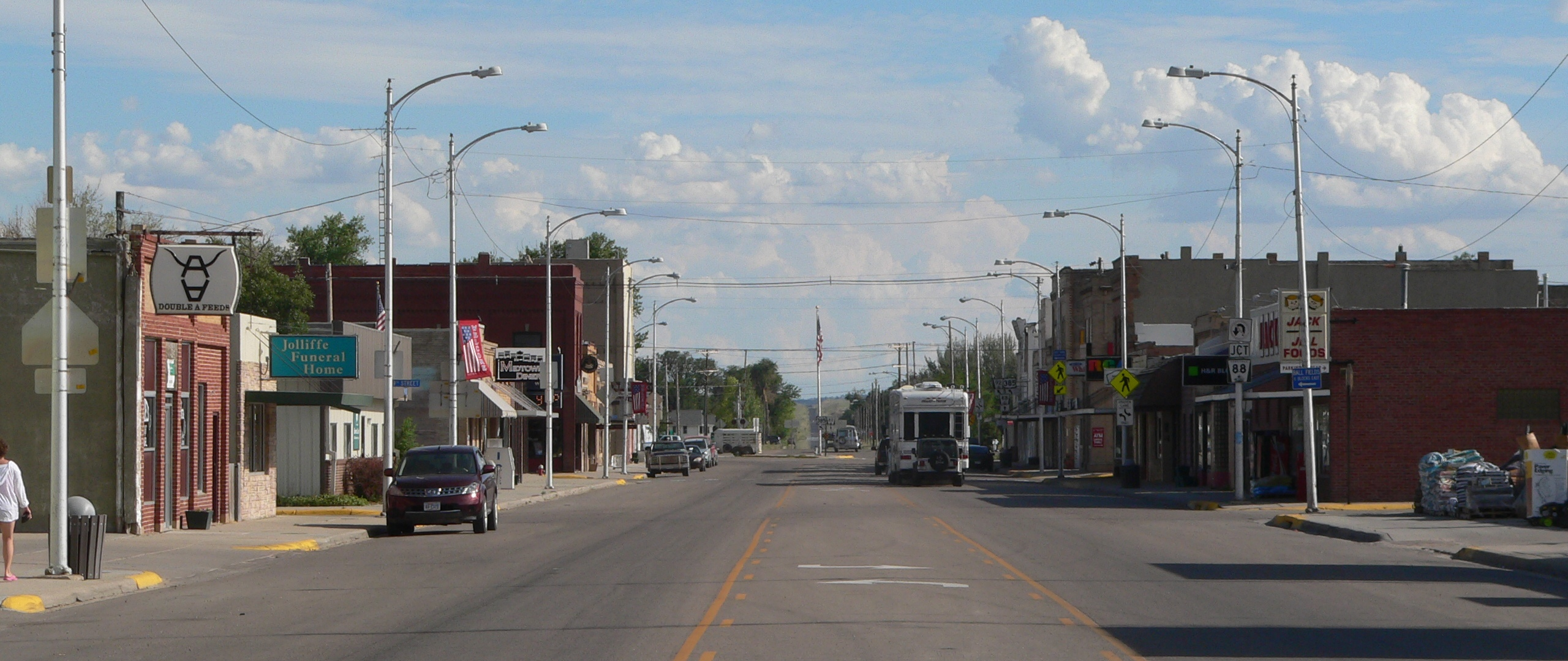
- Main Street

- Location in Morrill County and the state of Nebraska
- Coordinates: 41°39′51″N 103°05′50″W
- Country: United States
- State: Nebraska
- County: Morrill

Area
  - Total: 1.20 sq mi (3.11 km^{2})
  - Land: 1.20 sq mi (3.10 km^{2})
  - Water: 0.0039 sq mi (0.01 km^{2})
- Elevation: 3,665 ft (1,117 m)

Population (2020)
  - Total: 1,454
  - Density: 1,213.2/sq mi (468.43/km^{2})
- Time zone: UTC-7 (Mountain (MST))
  - Summer (DST): UTC-6 (MDT)
- ZIP code: 69336
- Area code: 308
- FIPS code: 31-06295
- GNIS feature ID: 2393416
- Website: www.bridgeportne.gov

Bridgeport is a city in Morrill County, Nebraska, United States. The population was 1,454 at the 2020 census. It is the county seat of Morrill County.

== History ==
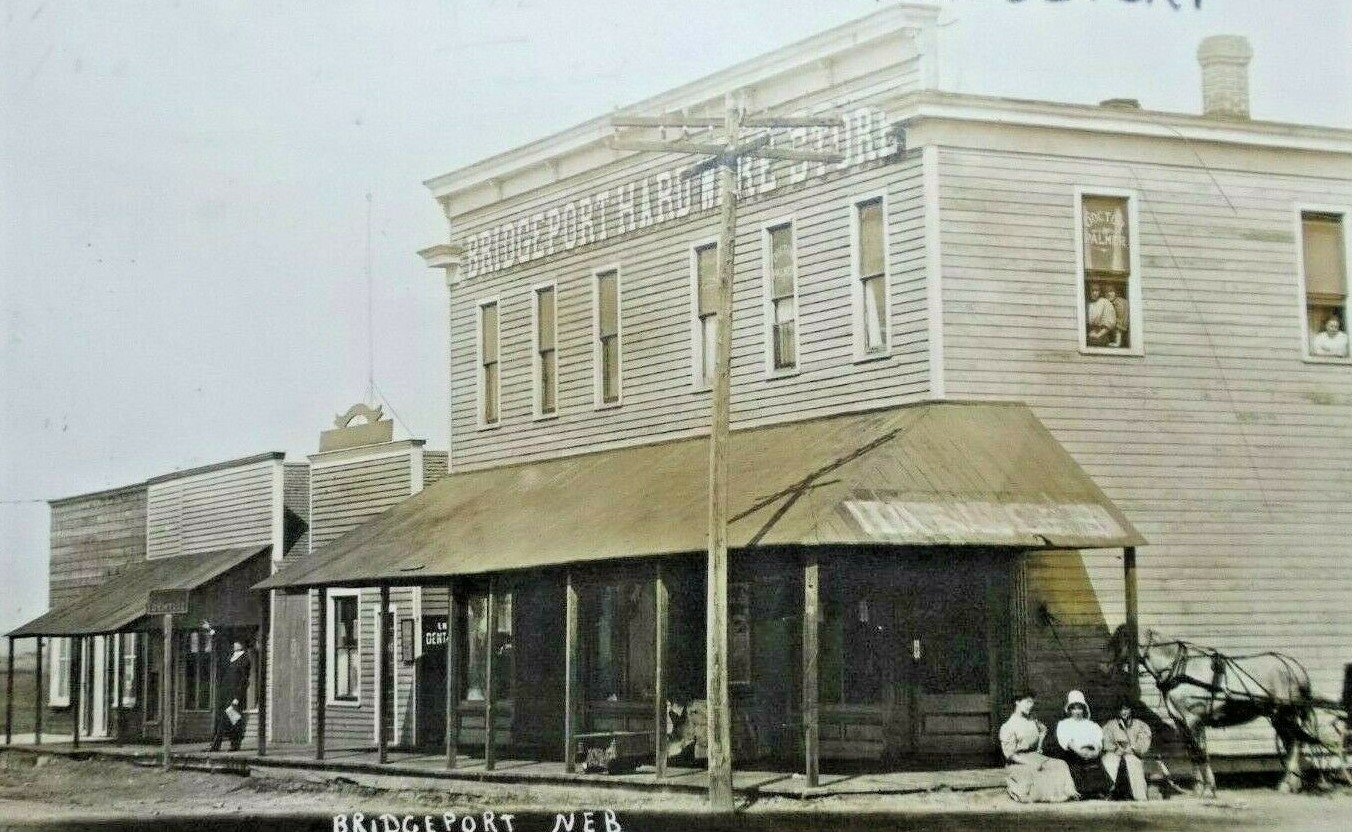
Bridgeport, Nebraska in 1907

Bridgeport got its start in the year 1899, following the construction of the Chicago, Burlington and Quincy Railroad through the territory. The town that sprang up took its name from a bridge over the North Platte River. Bridgeport was incorporated as a village in 1901.

== Geography ==
Bridgeport is located slightly southwest of the geographic center of Morrill County and is mostly on the south side of the North Platte River. U.S. Routes 26 and 385 converge on the city, sharing a bridge over the North Platte that enters the city from the north. US 26 leads northwest 38 miles (61 km) to Scottsbluff and southeast 88 miles (142 km) to Ogallala, while US 385 leads north 37 miles (60 km) to Alliance and south 41 miles (66 km) to Sidney. Nebraska Highway 92 also passes through Bridgeport, providing a more direct route of 34 miles (55 km) to Scottsbluff.

According to the U.S. Census Bureau, the city of Bridgeport has a total area of 1.20 square miles (3.11 km^{2}), of which 0.003 square miles (0.008 km^{2}), or 0.25%, is water, comprising the portion of the city limits that extends north over the North Platte River.

== Demographics ==
Historical population
Census	Pop.	Note	%±
1910	541		—
1920	1,235		128.3%
1930	1,421		15.1%
1940	1,520		7.0%
1950	1,631		7.3%
1960	1,645		0.9%
1970	1,490		−9.4%
1980	1,668		11.9%
1990	1,581		−5.2%
2000	1,594		0.8%
2010	1,545		−3.1%
2020	1,454		−5.9%
U.S. Decennial Census

=== 2010 census ===
As of the census of 2010, there were 1,545 people, 644 households, and 407 families residing in the city. The population density was 1,343.5 inhabitants per square mile (518.7/km^{2}). There were 728 housing units at an average density of 633.0 per square mile (244.4/km^{2}). The racial makeup of the city was 87.1% White, 0.5% African American, 1.9% Native American, 0.8% Asian, 8.1% from other races, and 1.6% from two or more races. Hispanic or Latino of any race were 19.2% of the population.

There were 644 households, of which 30.0% had children under the age of 18 living with them, 50.0% were married couples living together, 9.6% had a female householder with no husband present, 3.6% had a male householder with no wife present, and 36.8% were non-families. 33.7% of all households were made up of individuals, and 19% had someone living alone who was 65 years of age or older. The average household size was 2.34, and the average family size was 3.01.

The median age in the city was 40.3 years. 25.7% of residents were under the age of 18; 8% were between the ages of 18 and 24; 21.8% were from 25 to 44; 23.5% were from 45 to 64; and 21.1% were 65 years of age or older. The gender makeup of the city was 47.1% male and 52.9% female.

=== 2000 census ===
As of the census of 2000, there were 1,594 people, 654 households, and 419 families residing in the city. The population density was 1,671.1 inhabitants per square mile (645.2/km^{2}). There were 723 housing units at an average density of 758.0 per square mile (292.7/km^{2}). The racial makeup of the city was 90.72% White, 0.13% African American, 1.57% Native American, 0.31% Asian, 4.96% from other races, and 2.32% from two or more races. Hispanic or Latino of any race were 14.81% of the population.

There were 654 households, out of which 30.6% had children under the age of 18 living with them, 53.2% were married couples living together, 7.5% had a female householder with no husband present, and 35.8% were non-families. 32.9% of all households were made up of individuals, and 15.9% had someone living alone who was 65 years of age or older. The average household size was 2.38 and the average family size was 3.03.

In the city, the population was spread out, with 26.1% under the age of 18, 7.3% from 18 to 24, 25.2% from 25 to 44, 22.5% from 45 to 64, and 18.9% who were 65 years of age or older. The median age was 39 years. For every 100 females, there were 90.4 males. For every 100 females age 18 and over, there were 88.8 males.

As of 2000, the median income for a household in the city was $29,527, and the median income for a family was $37,813. Males had a median income of $30,037 versus $18,500 for females. The per capita income for the city was $14,320. About 7.7% of families and 12.0% of the population were below the poverty line, including 15.6% of those under age 18 and 9.4% of those age 65 or over.

== Education ==
The Bridgeport Public Schools school district has one elementary school and one junior/senior high school, both located in Bridgeport.

== Climate ==
Bridgeport has a borderline cool semi-arid climate (Köppen BSk)/humid continental climate (Dfa) characterised by hot summers and cold, dry, extremely variable winters featuring warm spells produced by chinook winds. The data below are from the WRCC, compiled from 1897 to when this chart was created in July 2018. The lowest temperature ever recorded in the state of Nebraska (−47 °F or −43.9 °C) was witnessed at Bridgeport on February 12, 1899. This record was later tied by the city of Oshkosh on December 22, 1989; that day, Bridgeport fell to −42 °F or −41.1 °C.

Climate data for Bridgeport, Nebraska (1991–2020 normals, extremes 1897–present)
Month	Jan	Feb	Mar	Apr	May	Jun	Jul	Aug	Sep	Oct	Nov	Dec	Year
Record high °F (°C)	75 (24)	80 (27)	88 (31)	95 (35)	99 (37)	107 (42)	111 (44)	109 (43)	103 (39)	97 (36)	81 (27)	74 (23)	111 (44)
Mean maximum °F (°C)	60.4 (15.8)	65.1 (18.4)	75.5 (24.2)	83.4 (28.6)	91.4 (33.0)	98.7 (37.1)	102.5 (39.2)	99.6 (37.6)	95.3 (35.2)	83.7 (28.7)	71.4 (21.9)	60.6 (15.9)	103.4 (39.7)
Mean daily maximum °F (°C)	41.1 (5.1)	45.0 (7.2)	56.0 (13.3)	64.2 (17.9)	73.3 (22.9)	85.2 (29.6)	91.5 (33.1)	89.1 (31.7)	80.6 (27.0)	65.6 (18.7)	51.9 (11.1)	41.1 (5.1)	65.4 (18.6)
Daily mean °F (°C)	28.4 (−2.0)	31.6 (−0.2)	41.0 (5.0)	48.7 (9.3)	58.5 (14.7)	69.4 (20.8)	75.8 (24.3)	73.3 (22.9)	64.3 (17.9)	50.0 (10.0)	37.8 (3.2)	28.4 (−2.0)	50.6 (10.3)
Mean daily minimum °F (°C)	15.8 (−9.0)	18.3 (−7.6)	26.0 (−3.3)	33.3 (0.7)	43.7 (6.5)	53.6 (12.0)	60.1 (15.6)	57.6 (14.2)	48.0 (8.9)	34.4 (1.3)	23.7 (−4.6)	15.7 (−9.1)	35.9 (2.2)
Mean minimum °F (°C)	−7.9 (−22.2)	−3.6 (−19.8)	7.2 (−13.8)	18.3 (−7.6)	29.5 (−1.4)	42.2 (5.7)	50.1 (10.1)	47.0 (8.3)	33.0 (0.6)	17.1 (−8.3)	2.8 (−16.2)	−6.6 (−21.4)	−14.7 (−25.9)
Record low °F (°C)	−35 (−37)	−47 (−44)	−27 (−33)	−11 (−24)	15 (−9)	28 (−2)	34 (1)	30 (−1)	14 (−10)	−7 (−22)	−19 (−28)	−42 (−41)	−47 (−44)
Average precipitation inches (mm)	0.36 (9.1)	0.50 (13)	0.91 (23)	2.17 (55)	3.31 (84)	2.89 (73)	2.43 (62)	2.06 (52)	1.70 (43)	1.28 (33)	0.57 (14)	0.45 (11)	18.63 (473)
Average snowfall inches (cm)	6.2 (16)	8.0 (20)	5.1 (13)	4.3 (11)	0.7 (1.8)	0.0 (0.0)	0.0 (0.0)	0.0 (0.0)	0.3 (0.76)	1.5 (3.8)	4.8 (12)	7.8 (20)	38.7 (98)
Average precipitation days (≥ 0.01 in)	3.3	3.8	4.5	7.0	9.2	8.0	6.4	5.3	4.8	5.1	2.9	3.2	63.5
Average snowy days (≥ 0.1 in)	2.4	3.0	2.1	1.3	0.2	0.0	0.0	0.0	0.1	0.7	1.9	2.6	14.3
Source: NOAA
