= Sandford Hall =

- U.S. National Register of Historic Places
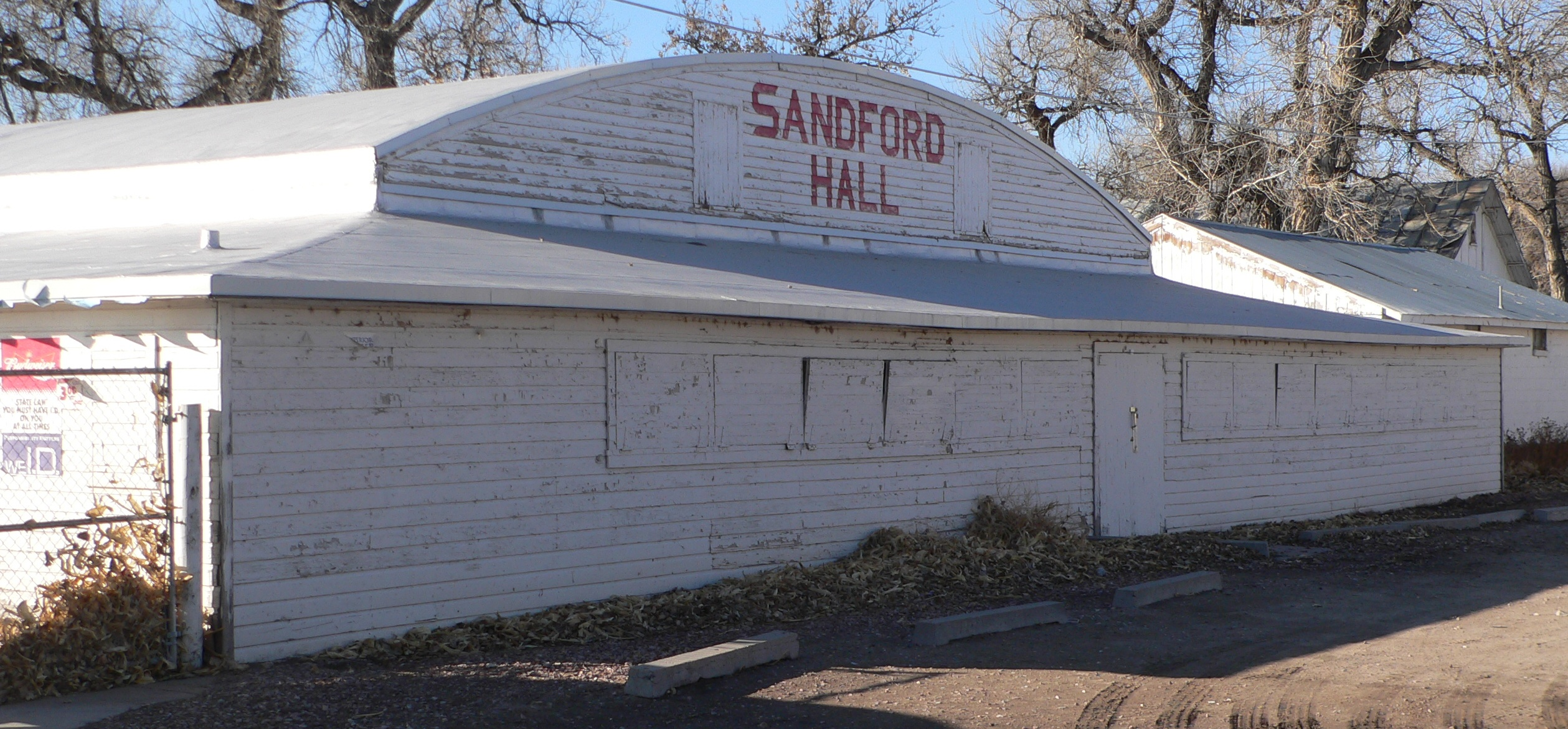
- Sandford Hall in 2012

- Location within Nebraska Location within the United States
- Location: 130625 County Road East, Mitchell, Nebraska
- Coordinates: 41°56′25″N 103°49′17″W
- Area: less than one acre
- Built: 1934
- Architectural style: Dance/Entertainment Hall
- NRHP reference No.: 97000771
- Added to NRHP: July 9, 1997

Sandford Hall is a historic building in Mitchell, Nebraska. It was built in 1934 as a dance hall to replace the old Mitchell Dance Pavilion. It was dedicated by the American Legion on March 28, 1934, with performances by Herbie Kay and Dorothy Lamour. Over the years, performers included Stan Kenton, Ted Weems, Tommy Dorsey, Lawrence Welk, Kay Kyser, Artie Shaw, Les Brown, Glenn Miller, Harry James, Henry Busse, Art Kassel, Benny Goodman and Gene Krupa. The building has been listed on the National Register of Historic Places since July 9, 1997.
