= Herbie Kay =

American guitarist, trumpeter and big band leader

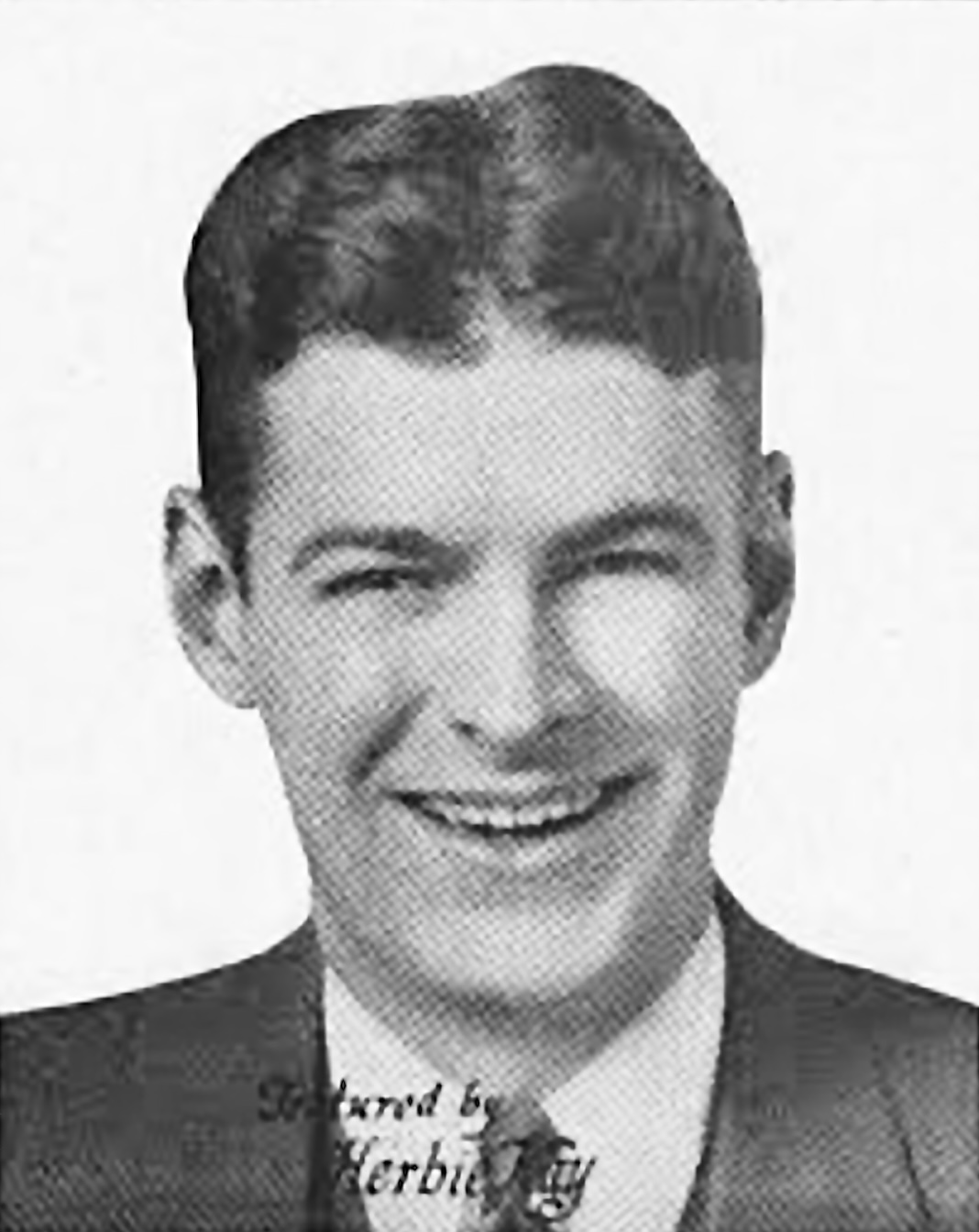
- Born: John Herbert Powers Kaumeyer; November 5, 1904; Chicago, Illinois, U.S.
- Died: May 11, 1944 (aged 39); Dallas, Texas, U.S.
- Spouses: Dorothy Lamour (m. 1935–1939) Margaret Rinehart (m. 1940–1944)
- Musical career
- Genres: Swing music, big band
- Occupation(s): Bandleader, musician, composer
- Instrument(s): Guitar, trumpet
- Years active: 1925–1942
- Labels: Columbia Records

Herbie Kay (born John Herbert Powers Kaumeyer, November 5, 1904 Chicago, Illinois – May 11, 1944, Dallas, Texas) was an American guitarist, trumpeter and big band leader.

During the 1930s, his band gained a following in the Midwestern United States. Kay is best remembered for being the first husband of actress Dorothy Lamour and his 1935 recording of the song "Rhythm Steps", which gained mainstream attention starting in 2022 thanks to Internet exposure on the Am I Right song parody website.

== Early life ==
Kay was born John Herbert Powers Kaumeyer on November 5, 1904 in Chicago, Illinois to Katherine Hannon and William Kaumeyer, both of whom were Illinois natives.

== Career ==
Kay's career began while he was a student at Northwestern University, where he played in dance bands in the mid-1920s. He took over Bud Dant's orchestra and led his own group from the late 1920s, and played extensively in the Chicago area from the early 1930s to the early 1940s, including a longstanding residency at the Blackhawk Restaurant.

Kay did some touring in the Western United States and performed at the Lakeside in Denver, Colorado; Sebastian’s Cotton Club in Los Angeles, Santa Catalina Casino and the Mural Room of the St. Francis Hotel in San Francisco, all in California.

On March 28, 1934, Kay and his orchestra performed at the grand opening of Sandford Hall in Mitchell, Nebraska.

Kay hired Dorothy Lamour as a vocalist in 1932, and married her on May 10, 1935; by 1936, Lamour had moved to Hollywood to pursue a film career, and her marriage to Kay ended in 1939.

For most of his career, he led a band with four saxophones, four brass instruments, and four rhythm instruments. Singers included Dorothy Lamour, Shirley Lloyd, Wynne Fair, Helen Connor, Elvan "Fuzzy" Combs, King Harvey, Ken Nealy, and a vocal trio called "The Three Kays" (Combs, Harvey and Sam Chase). Charles "Bud" Dant and Charlie Kyner were the band's arrangers. Roswell W. Metzger was Kay's manager and co-wrote several songs with Kay; they include "I’ve an Evening for Sale" (1933) and "This is a Night Made for Love" (1930).

== Later life and death ==
Kay dissolved the group around 1942 and moved to Dallas, where he lived with his second wife, Margaret Rinehart, whom he married on August 13, 1940.

He died of melanoma in Dallas, Texas on May 11, 1944.

== Discography ==
Herbie Kay recorded for Vocalion and Columbia Records and toured throughout the Western United States from 1935-1939. A total of five recording sessions were made.

November 8, 1935 - Chicago, Illinois

- "Rhythm Steps" (Shirley Lloyd & Three Kays, vocal) — Herbie Kay’s best-known recording and an Internet meme on Am I Right from 2022-2024. Columbia 3109-D.
- "Precious Little One" (King Harvey, vocal) — Columbia 3109-D.
- "A Little Bit Independent" (Shirley Lloyd, vocal) — Columbia 3100-D.
- "Remember Last Night" (Fuzzy Combs, vocal) — Columbia 3100-D

February 24, 1936 — Chicago, Illinois

- "Swing, Mister Charlie" (Three Kays, vocal) — First take rejected.
- "Sunday on the Swanee" (Fuzzy Combs, vocal) — Columbia 3126-D. Also released on Parlophone F-536.
- "Za Zoo Za" (Shirley Lloyd, vocal) — Columbia 3126-D. Also released on Parlophone F-536.
- "Chopsticks (waltz)" — Columbia 3125-D.

March 3, 1936 — Chicago, Illinois

- "Swing, Mister Charlie" — First recorded on February 24, 1936 and rejected; recorded again on March 3, 1936 and released on Columbia 3125-D.

April 30, 1938 — Los Angeles, California. All vocals by Dorothy Lamour.

- "Lovelight in the Starlight" — Brunswick 8132, Columbia DB-1777 (England), Columbia C-7039 (China), Columbia CQ-1419 (Italy)
- "Little Lady Make-Believe" — Brunswick 8132, Columbia DB-1783 (England)
- "Tonight Will Live" — Brunswick 8154, Columbia DB-1783 (England)
- "On a Tropic Night" — Brunswick 8154, Columbia DB-1811 (England)

March 22, 1939 — Los Angeles, California

- "Peter, Peter, Pumpkin Eater" — Columbia 36135
- "Violets and Friends" (Theme Song, waltz) — Columbia 36135
- "Y'Had It Coming To You" (Wynne Fair, vocal) — Vocalion 4820
- "Glorianna" (Fuzzy Combs and band, vocal) — Vocalion 4752
- "By Candlelight" (King Harvey & The Kay Kwire, vocal) — Vocalion 4820
- "It’s All So New To Me" (King Harvey, vocal) — Vocalion 4752

Herbie Kay also made several Soundie films during 1940-41. His known Soundies include, "Say Si, Si", "I’m Looking Out the Window", "Willie, Willie, Will Ya?" and "San Antonio Rose".

== "Rhythm Steps" ==
"Rhythm Steps"
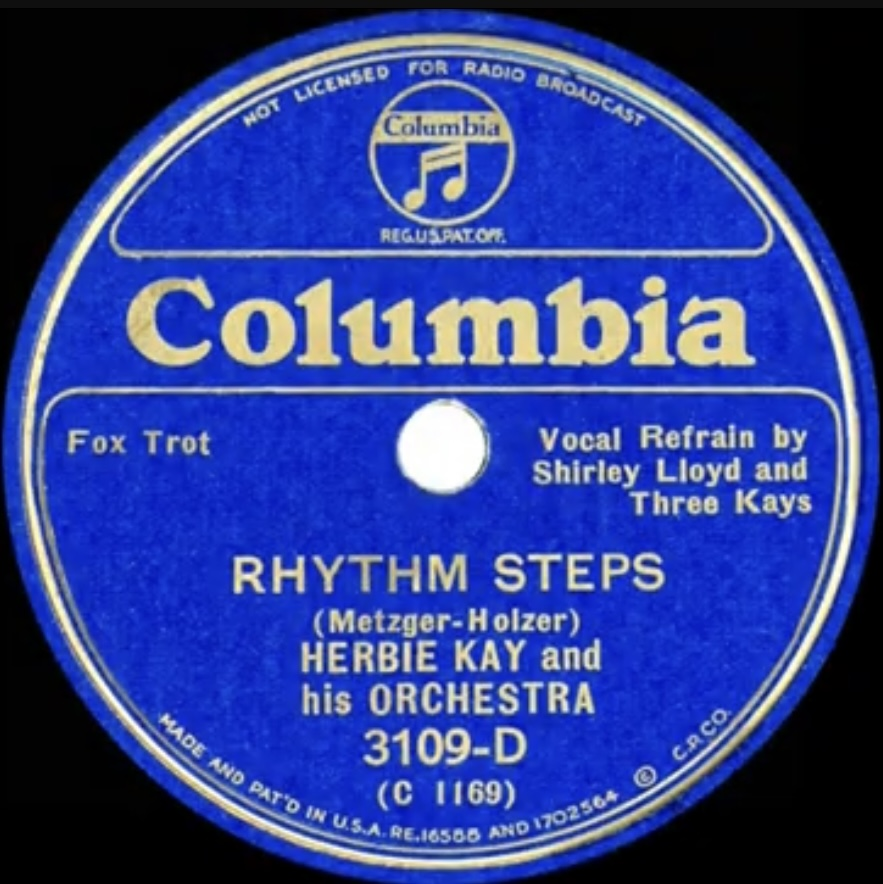
- 78 single

Single by Herbie Kay and his Orchestra
- B-side: "Precious Little One"
- Released: February 1936
- Recorded: November 8, 1935
- Studio: Vocalion Records studios
- Venue: Merchandise Mart, Chicago, Illinois, USA
- Genre: Swing, jazz, popular
- Length: 2:45
- Label: Columbia Records
- Songwriter(s): Lou Holzer (music), Roswell W. "Ros" Metzger (lyrics)

Herbie Kay and his Orchestra singles chronology
"Rhythm Steps" (1936)	"A Little Bit Independent" (1936)

"Rhythm Steps" was recorded for the Columbia Records label on November 8, 1935, and released in February 1936 on Columbia 3109-D. Written by band manager Roswell W. "Ros" Metzger and Lou Holzer, the recording contains vocals by Shirley Lloyd and the Three Kays.

Originally intended for release on the Vocalion label (along with the other songs from this session and the next Kay sessions in February/March 1936), it was switched over to Columbia at the last minute; as a result, some discographies list this track as being unreleased.

=== Arrangement ===
The recording starts with a brief guitar riff, likely played by Kay. One instrumental chorus in C major is played, followed by use of glissando in the brass section, accompanied by rim shots.

Shirley Lloyd and the Three Kays then sing their vocals, starting with a verse, followed by Shirley taking the first performance of the vocal chorus in G major. The title is repeated five times throughout each chorus.

After another glissando/rim shot riff, the Three Kays return the key back to C major, accompanied by a clarinet. They sing the vocal chorus twice, with an instrumental call-back between tenor sax and muted trumpets during the final performance of the chorus.

The very last use of the title in the lyrics is followed by a brief descending brass motif and ends with the phrase "Simple as the day is long". Finally, a three-note accentuation by the whole orchestra is heard, immediately followed by a guitar chord and a rim shot.

=== Notes ===
The song is registered in the ASCAP ACE Repertory as “Rhythm Step”, written by Lou Holzer and Roswell William Metzger, and published by Warner Brothers Music Division. In the United States Copyright Office Copyright Catalog, it was entered in as the following:

Rhythm step; w and m Lou Holzer and Ros Metzger; with arr, for guit., etc. November 25, 1935; E pub. 51939; Harms, inc., New York. 28984.

The copyright was later renewed on December 10, 1962.

=== In popular culture ===
The song was briefly featured in the 1936 Merrie Melodies cartoon, The CooCoo Nut Grove, performed by a caricature of contemporary bandleader Ben Bernie. It is an instrumental version, similar to the opening of the record arrangement and has a brief segment in waltz time. The song also appears in another Merrie Melodies cartoon, Page Miss Glory (1936 film).

=== Recording personnel ===
- Herbie Kay (guitar and leader)
- Shirley Lloyd (vocal) and The Three Kays (vocal trio of Elvan “Fuzzy” Combs, King Harvey and Sam Chase)
- Arnold Liddell, Lou Holzer, Donald Worrall (trumpets)
- Larry Baur, Bill Alexander (trombones)
- Elvan Floyd “Fuzzy” Combs (tenor sax/vocal), Sam Chase (clt/ts/vocal), Gene Glennan (as/clt)
- Frank Vivola (glockenspiel, heard during introductory guitar riff)
- Bud Dant (string bass/arranger), Charles Kyner (piano), King Harvey (second guitar), Frank Sehrer (drums)
- Fritz Miller (first violin, not heard here), Norman Kirschner (second violin, not heard here)
