= Charles Grosvenor (disambiguation) =

Charles Grosvenor is a animator, storyboard artist, director and television producer.

Charles Grosvenor may also refer to:

- Charles H. Grosvenor, US Representative
- Charles R. Grosvenor Jr, creator of Am I Right
