= Otto John Hehnke =

American architect

- Born: c. 1870; Hamburg, Germany
- Died: September 24, 1944 (aged 73–74); Scottsbluff, Nebraska
- Occupation: Architect

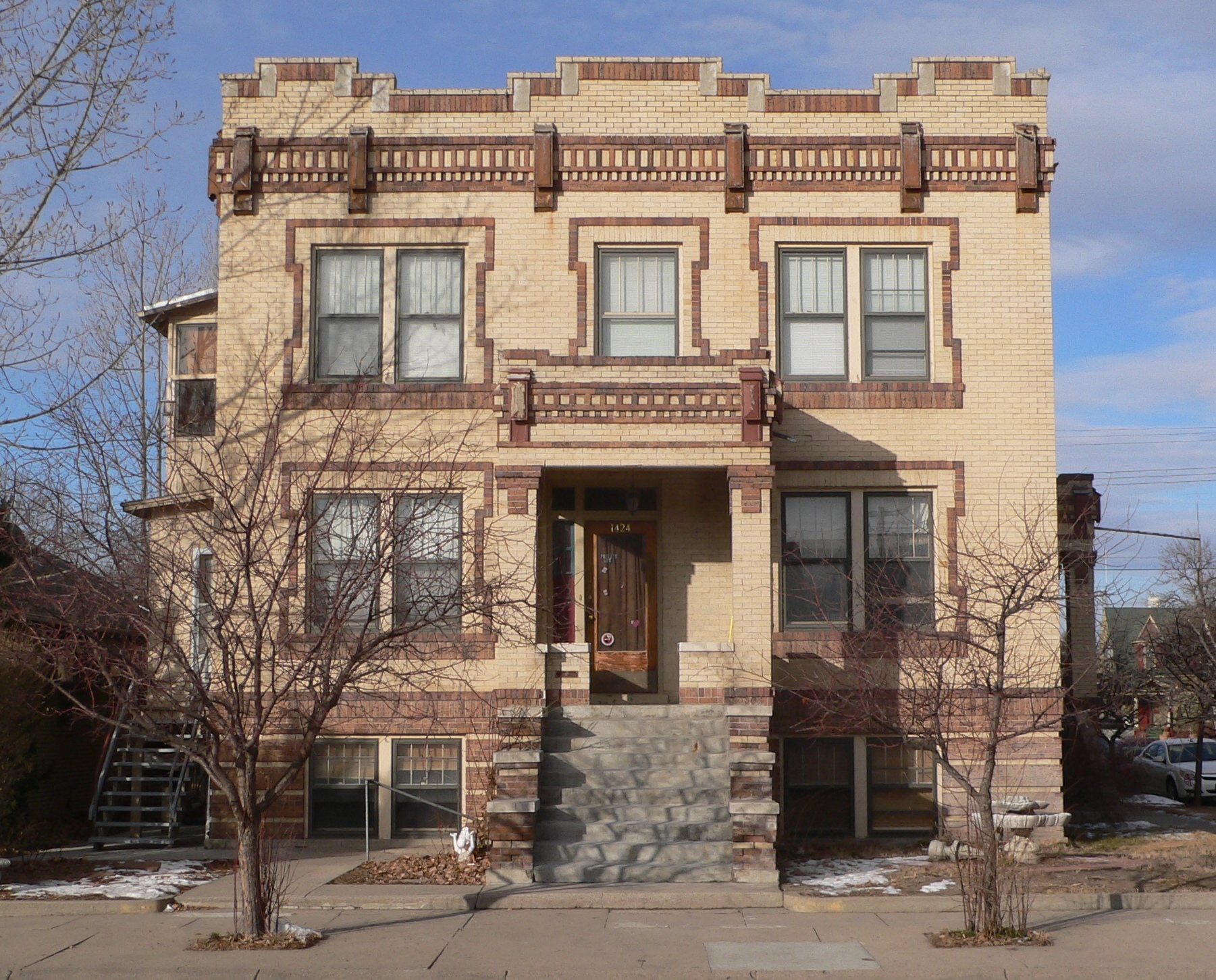
Fontenelle Apartment House, designed by Hehnke.

Otto John Hehnke (c. 1870 – September 24, 1944) was a German-born American architect. He lived in Scottsbluff, Nebraska, where he designed the Fontenelle Apartment House and the Scottsbluff Carnegie Library, two buildings listed on the National Register of Historic Places.
