= National Register of Historic Places listings in Scotts Bluff County, Nebraska =

Location of Scotts Bluff County in Nebraska

Scotts Bluff County, Nebraska, United States, has 21 properties and districts listed on the National Register of Historic Places, including two National Historic Landmarks.

The locations of National Register properties and districts for which the latitude and longitude coordinates are included below may be seen in a map.

This National Park Service list is complete through NPS recent listings posted October 30, 2026.

== Current listings ==
	Name on the Register	Image	Date listed	Location	City or town	Description
1	Fontenelle Apartment House	Fontenelle Apartment House	July 23, 1998 (#98000891)	1424 4th Ave. 41°51′40″N 103°39′27″W	Scottsbluff	
2	Fort Mitchell Site	Fort Mitchell Site	June 7, 1978 (#78001713)	Southwest of Scottsbluff; 41°50′30″N 103°43′50″W	Scottsbluff	
3	Gering Courier Building	Gering Courier Building	October 15, 2004 (#04000799)	1428 10th St. 41°49′23″N 103°39′34″W	Gering	
4	Henry State Aid Bridges	Henry State Aid Bridges	June 29, 1992 (#92000732)	North Platte River south of Henry; 41°59′27″N 104°02′50″W	Henry	
5	Interstate Canal Bridge	Interstate Canal Bridge	June 29, 1992 (#92000731)	County road over Interstate Canal, 9.3 miles north of Scottsbluff; 41°59′50″N 103°38′18″W	Scottsbluff	
6	Knorr-Holden Continuous Corn Plot	Knorr-Holden Continuous Corn Plot	June 11, 1992 (#92000703)	Scottsbluff Experiment Station, on Experiment Farm Road about a mile and a half west of Nebraska Highway 71, north of Scottsbluff; 41°56′39″N 103°42′01″W	Scottsbluff	
7	Lincoln Hotel	Lincoln Hotel	March 5, 1998 (#98000187)	1421 Broadway; 41°51′40″N 103°39′43″W	Scottsbluff	
8	Marquis Opera House	Marquis Opera House	October 10, 1985 (#85003103)	1601-1603 Broadway; 41°51′45″N 103°39′43″W	Scottsbluff	
9	Midwest Theater	Midwest Theater	July 3, 1997 (#97000728)	1707 Broadway; 41°51′49″N 103°39′44″W	Scottsbluff	
10	M.B. Quivey House	M.B. Quivey House	March 24, 1983 (#83001105)	1462 19th Ave. 41°56′33″N 103°48′50″W	Mitchell	
11	Robidoux Pass	Robidoux Pass	October 15, 1966 (#66000450)	9 miles west of Gering; 41°48′32″N 103°50′12″W	Gering	
12	Saddle Club	Saddle Club	December 27, 2007 (#07001324)	2000 W. Overland; 41°51′30″N 103°41′32″W	Scottsbluff	
13	Sandford Hall	Sandford Hall	July 9, 1997 (#97000771)	130625 County Road E 41°56′25″N 103°49′19″W	Mitchell	
14	Scotts Bluff County Courthouse	Scotts Bluff County Courthouse	January 10, 1990 (#89002230)	10th and Q Sts. 41°49′35″N 103°39′37″W	Gering	
15	Scotts Bluff National Monument	Scotts Bluff National Monument	October 15, 1966 (#66000117)	3 miles west of Gering on Nebraska Highway 92; 41°50′03″N 103°42′24″W	Gering	
16	Scottsbluff Carnegie Library	Scottsbluff Carnegie Library	September 3, 1981 (#81000373)	106 E. 18th St. 41°51′51″N 103°39′38″W	Scottsbluff	
17	Signal Butte	Signal Butte	October 15, 1966 (#66000452)	West of Gering; 41°47′50″N 103°54′24″W	Gering	
18	Severin Sorensen House	Severin Sorensen House	March 31, 1983 (#83001106)	2345 17th St. 41°49′56″N 103°40′14″W	Gering	
19	Tri-State Land Company Headquarters Building	Tri-State Land Company Headquarters Building	January 25, 1997 (#96001615)	13 W. Overland St. 41°51′34″N 103°39′48″W	Scottsbluff	
20	US Post Office-Scottsbluff	US Post Office-Scottsbluff	October 5, 1989 (#89001462)	120 E. 16th St. 41°51′44″N 103°39′35″W	Scottsbluff	
21	Western Public Service Building	Western Public Service Building	October 15, 2004 (#04000798)	1721 Broadway; 41°51′51″N 103°39′43″W	Scottsbluff	

== See also ==
- List of National Historic Landmarks in Nebraska
- National Register of Historic Places listings in Nebraska
