= Lied Scottsbluff Public Library =

Public library in Scottsbluff, Nebraska, U.S.

- 41.865008081401484°N 103.65789945574477°W
- Location: 1809 3rd Ave., Scottsbluff, Nebraska, U.S.
- Type: Public library
- Established: 1917; 109 years ago

Collection
- Size: 53,411

Access and use
- Circulation: 118,567
- Population served: 33,091

Other information
- Website: scottsbluff.org/departments/library/index.php

Lied Scottsbluff Public Library is the public library of Scottsbluff, Nebraska, United States. It was formed in 1917 and moved into its first permanent building in 1922, a Carnegie library. The current library opened in 1966.

== History ==
- Scottsbluff Carnegie Library
- U.S. National Register of Historic Places
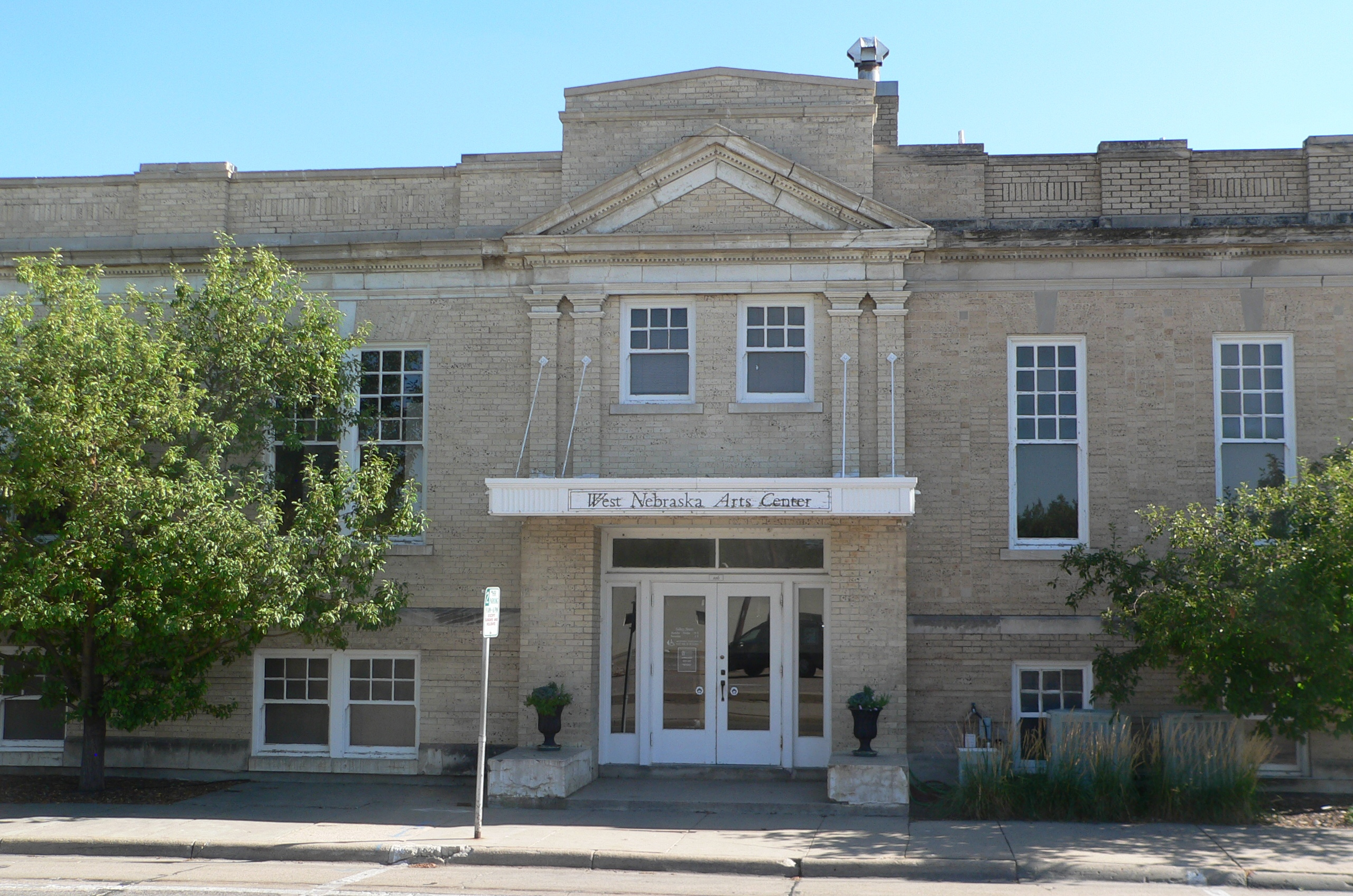
- Scottsbluff Carnegie Library in 2010
- Location: 106 East 18th Street, Scottsbluff, Nebraska, U.S.
- Coordinates: 41°51′51″N 103°39′38″W
- Area: less than one acre
- Built: 1922
- Architect: Robert A. Bradley; Otto John Hehnke
- Architectural style: Classical Revival
- NRHP reference No.: 81000373
- Added to NRHP: September 3, 1981

Lied Scottsbluff Public Library was originally announced in 1914 and was developed by the Woman's Club of Scottsbluff. While the city had attempted to secure a library years prior, it wasn't until 1914 that Andrew Carnegie announced that he would financially support the construction of one. Development endured several delays before a site was chosen in 1920. The building was completed in 1922, following two years of construction, and the library officially opened the following month. The library underwent a major expansion in 1936 within the same style.

Due to the library's small size, a new library was announced in 1965. Also done in attempt to make Scottsbluff a major regional library provider, the library was more than double the size of the previous. The library officially opened on September 17, 1966 and was dedicated November of that same year. The previous library closed and was converted into the West Nebraska Arts Center in 1969. It was later listed on the National Register of Historic Places in September 3, 1981. The current library underwent a major expansion in 2010, adding a children's library to the East of the building.

== Architecture ==
The original Scottsbluff Public Library was a Carnegie library designed by architect Robert A. Bradley in the Classical Revival architectural style. The expansion was built in the same style and was designed by architect Otto John Hehnke. The current library was designed by Stanley J. How and Associates, with its expansion designed by Leo A. Daly.
