= M.B. Quivey House =

Historic house in Nebraska, United States

- M. B. Quivey House
- U.S. National Register of Historic Places
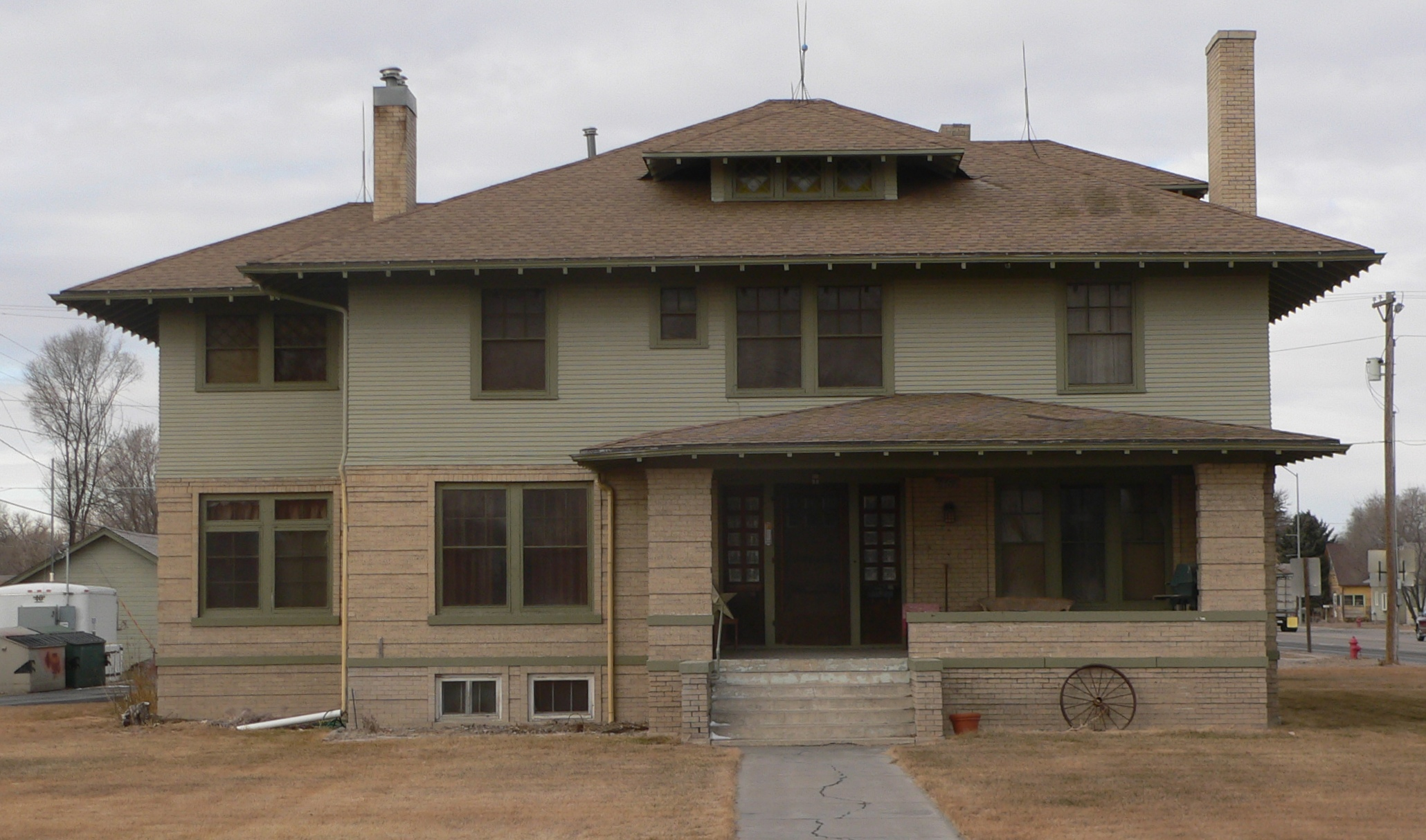
- The house in 2012

- Location within Nebraska Location within the United States
- Location: 1462 19th Avenue, Mitchell, Nebraska
- Coordinates: 41°56′33″N 103°48′48″W
- Area: less than one acre
- Built: 1914
- Architect: J. W. Hall
- Architectural style: vernacular Prairie School
- NRHP reference No.: 83001105
- Added to NRHP: March 24, 1983

The M.B. Quivey House is a historic two-and-a-half-story house in Mitchell, Nebraska. It was built in 1914 for Maurice B. Quivey, a businessman from Hamlin, New York who co-founded the Mitchell Mercantile Company with F. M. Raymond in 1905. The house was designed in "a vernacular interpretation of the Prairie School style of architecture" by architect J. W. Hall. It was acquired by Harold Coleman in 1946 and remodelled into apartments. It has been listed on the National Register of Historic Places since March 24, 1983.
