= United States Post Office (Scottsbluff, Nebraska) =

- U.S. Post Office - Scottsbluff
- U.S. National Register of Historic Places
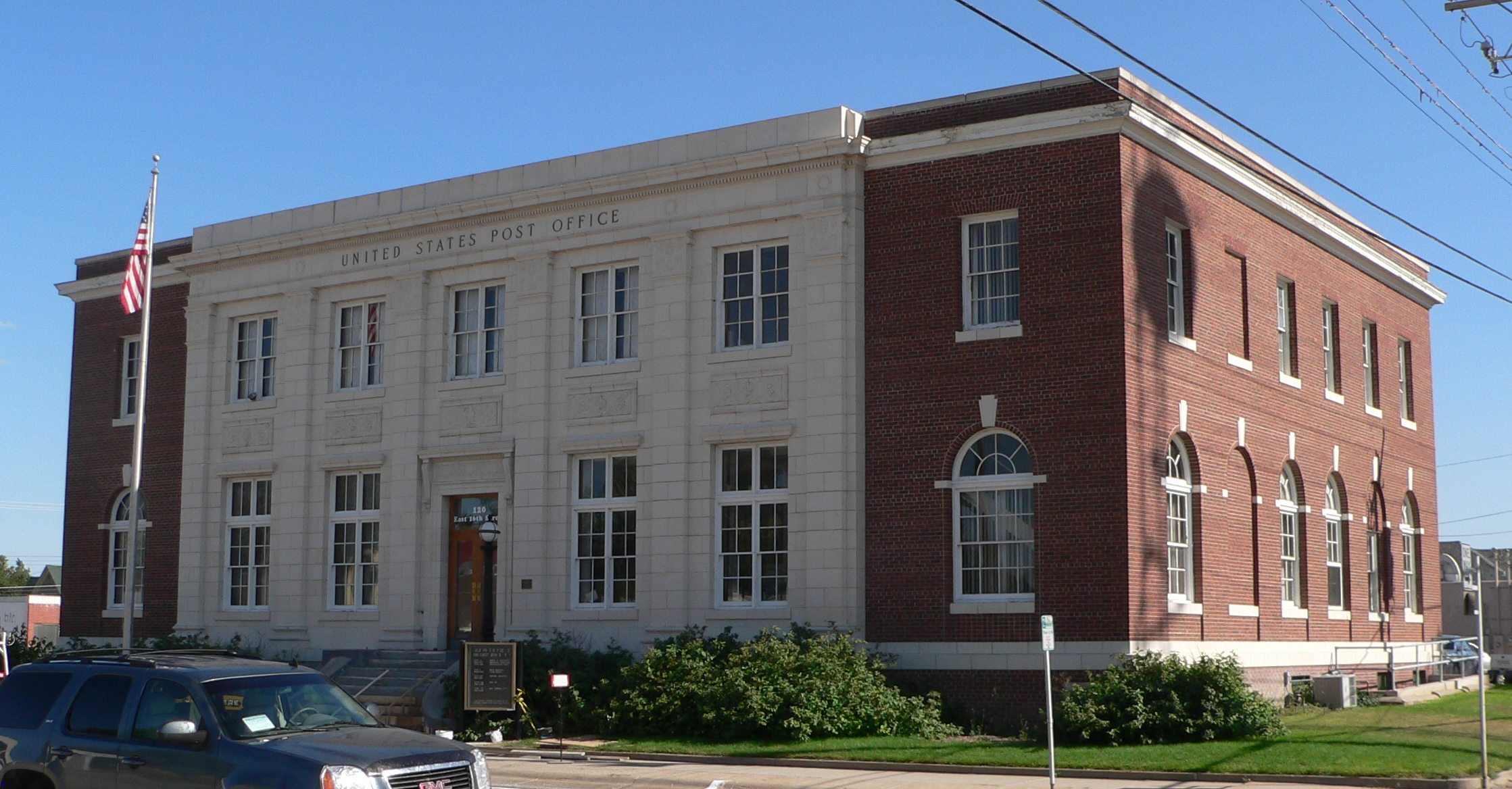
- The building in 2010

- Location within Nebraska Location within the United States
- Location: 120 East 16th Street, Scottsbluff, Nebraska
- Coordinates: 41°51′44″N 103°39′35″W
- Area: 0.5 acres (0.20 ha)
- Built: 1930
- Built by: Bernard R. Desjardins
- Architect: James A. Wetmore
- Architectural style: Renaissance Revival
- NRHP reference No.: 89001462
- Added to NRHP: October 5, 1989

The United States Post Office-Scottsbluff is a historic building in Scottsbluff, Nebraska. It was designed in the Renaissance Revival style by architect James A. Wetmore and built by Bernard R. Desjardins in 1930. Its construction was jeopardized by the Great Depression, and initial plans for a larger building were scrapped. It has been listed on the National Register of Historic Places since October 5, 1989.
