= Lincoln Hotel (Scottsbluff, Nebraska) =

- U.S. National Register of Historic Places
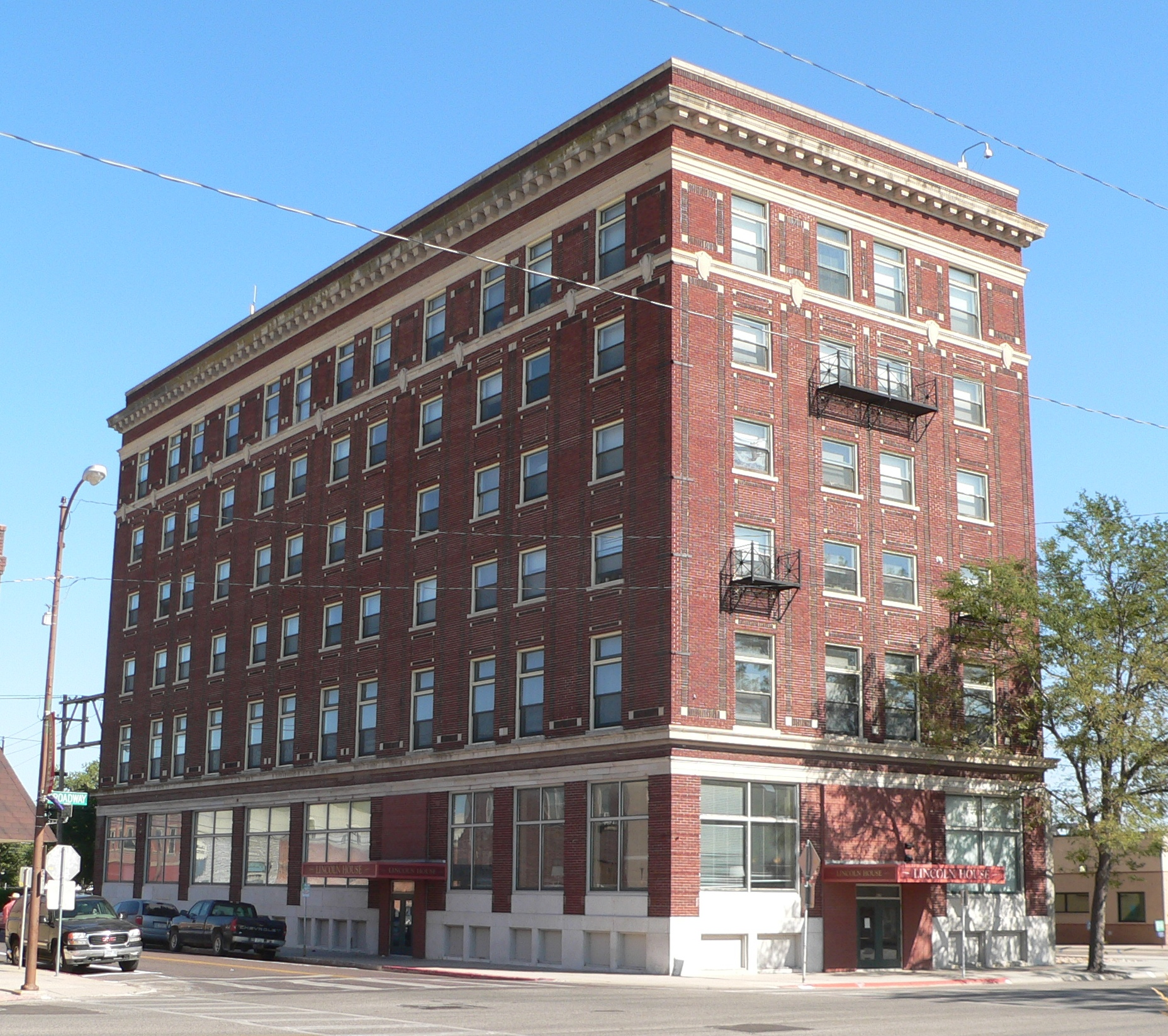
- The building in 2010

- Location within Nebraska Location within the United States
- Location: 1421 Broadway, Scottsbluff, Nebraska
- Coordinates: 41°51′40″N 103°39′43″W
- Area: less than one acre
- Built: 1918
- Built by: Childes & Price
- Architect: A. Bandy
- Architectural style: Classical Revival
- NRHP reference No.: 98000187
- Added to NRHP: March 5, 1998

The Lincoln Hotel is a historic hotel building in Scottsbluff, Nebraska. It was built by Childes & Price in 1917-1918 for the Nebraska Hotel Company, whose directors were F.E. Schaaf and R.W. Johnston. The Scottsbluff Commercial Club donated the land and purchased $5,000 of stocks in the company, which went bankrupt a few years later. The building was designed in the Classical Revival style by architect A. Bandy. From 1965 to 1971 the building was used as dormitories and classrooms by the Hiram Scott College, and later used as dormitories again by the Platte Valley Bible College from 1976 to 1983. It has been listed on the National Register of Historic Places since March 5, 1998.
