= Fontenelle Apartment House =

- U.S. National Register of Historic Places
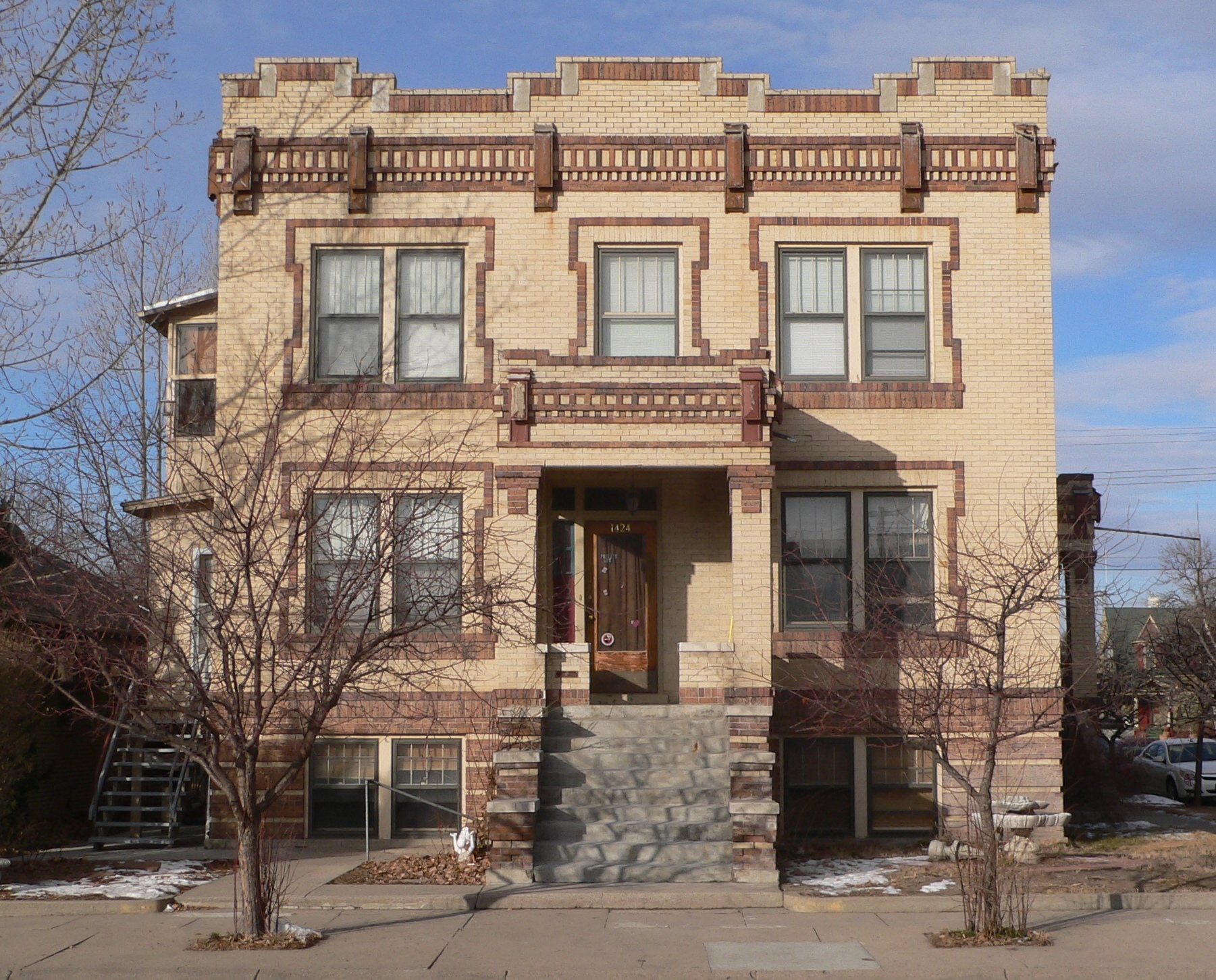
- The building in 2012

- Location within Nebraska Location within the United States
- Location: 1424 Fourth Avenue, Scottsbluff, Nebraska
- Coordinates: 41°51′40″N 103°39′25″W
- Area: less than one acre
- Built by: G. J. Appleburg
- Architect: Otto John Hehnke
- Architectural style: American Craftsman
- NRHP reference No.: 98000891
- Added to NRHP: July 23, 1998

The Fontenelle Apartment House is a historic apartment building in Scottsbluff, Nebraska. It was built in 1917 by G. J. Appleburg, and designed in the American Craftsman style by architect Otto John Hehnke, with "ornamental brickwork at the cornice line, at the half-basement and around the windows and vestibules [...] comprised of dark raised face brick with distinct color variations within the coursework." It has been listed on the National Register of Historic Places since July 23, 1998.
