= Western Public Service Building =

- U.S. National Register of Historic Places
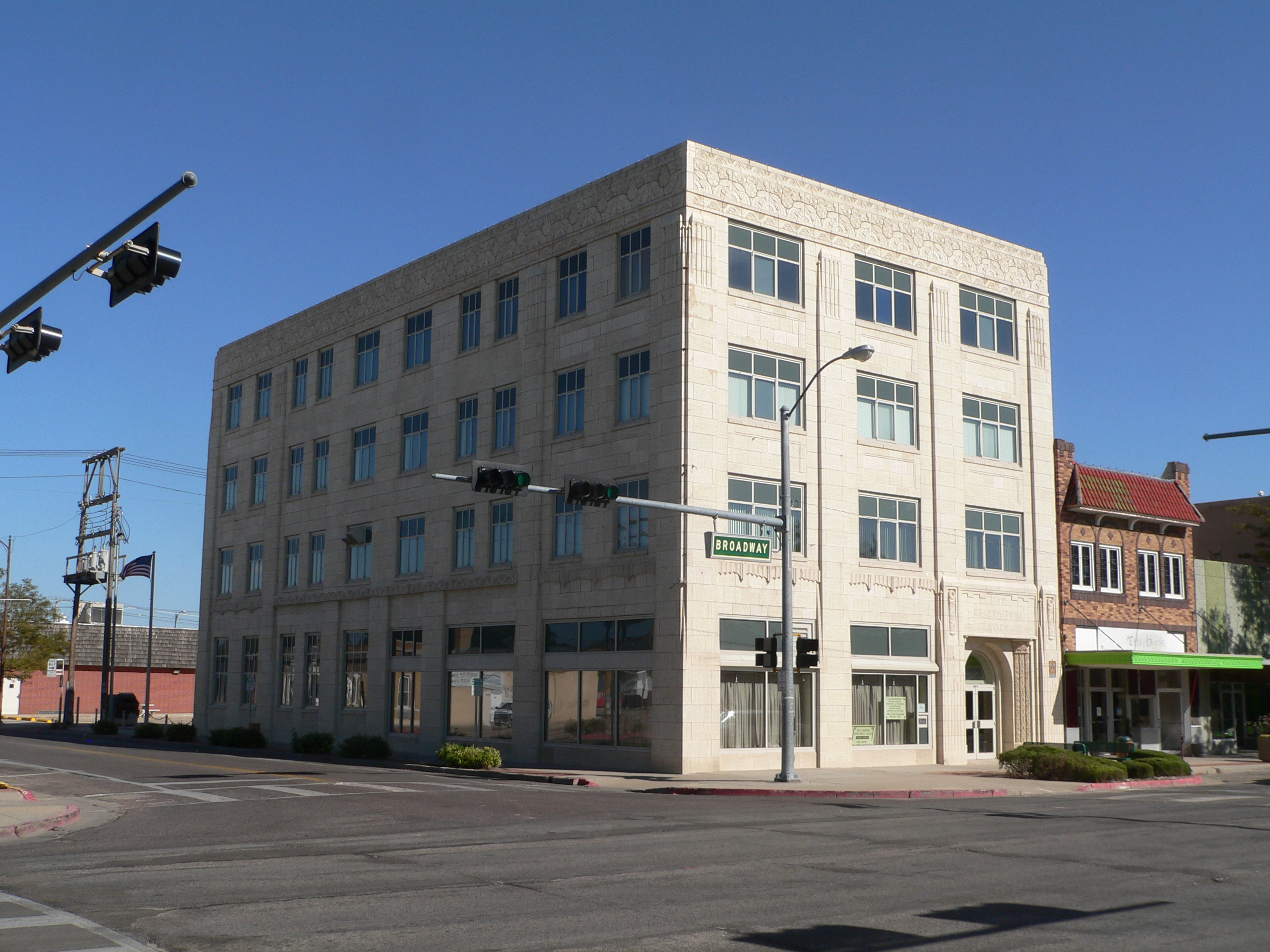
- The building in 2010

- Location within Nebraska Location within the United States
- Location: 1721 Broadway, Scottsbluff, Nebraska
- Coordinates: 41°51′51″N 103°39′43″W
- Area: less than one acre
- Built: 1931
- Built by: Ernest Leafgreen
- Architect: Everett L. Goldsmith
- Architectural style: Art Deco
- NRHP reference No.: 04000798
- Added to NRHP: October 15, 2004

The Western Public Service Building is a historic building in Scottsbluff, Nebraska. It was built in 1931 by Ernest Leafgreen for the Western Public Service Company, an electricity company whose president was E. C. Van Diest. It was designed in the Art Deco style by architect Everett L. Goldsmith, with "terra cotta sheathing of the two public facades, the west and the north." It has been listed on the National Register of Historic Places since October 15, 2004.
