= Dorothy Lamour =

American actress and singer (1914–1996)

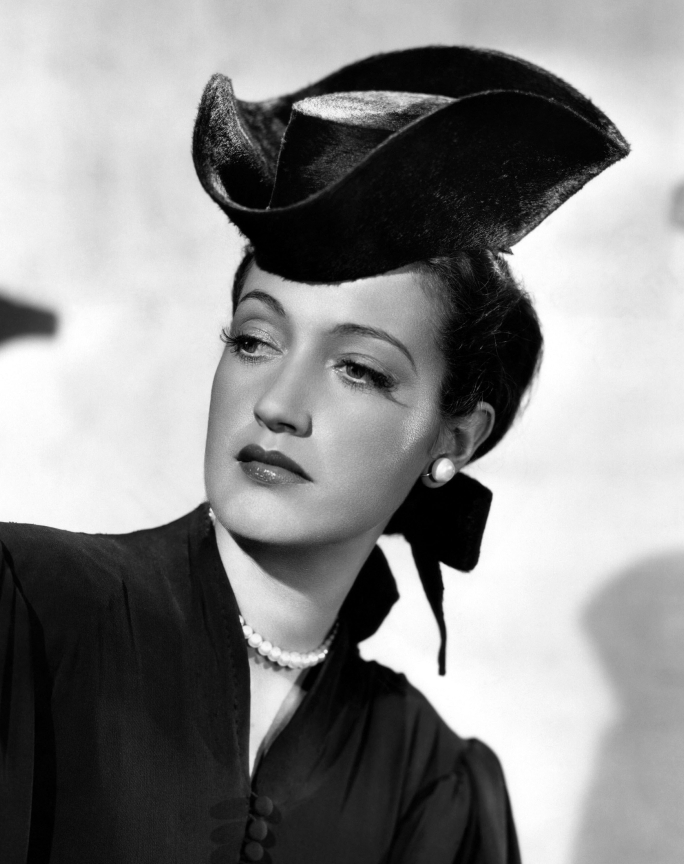
- Lamour in 1945
- Born: Mary Leta Dorothy Slaton; December 10, 1914; New Orleans, Louisiana, U.S.
- Died: September 22, 1996 (aged 81); Los Angeles, California, U.S.
- Resting place: Forest Lawn Memorial Park
- Occupations: Actress; singer
- Years active: 1933–1995
- Known for: The Jungle Princess; Road to Singapore; High, Wide and Handsome; The Hurricane; Road to Bali; Disputed Passage
- Spouses: Herbie Kay (m. 1935; div. 1939) William Ross Howard III (m. 1943; died 1978)
- Children: 2

Dorothy Lamour (born Mary Leta Dorothy Slaton; New Orleans, December 10, 1914 – Los Angeles, September 22, 1996) was an American actress and singer. She is best remembered for having appeared in the Road to... movies, a series of successful comedies starring Bing Crosby and Bob Hope.

Lamour began her career in the 1930s as a big band singer. In 1936, she moved to Hollywood, where she signed with Paramount Pictures. Her appearance as Ulah in The Jungle Princess (1936) brought her fame and marked the beginning of her image as the "Sarong Queen".

In 1940, Lamour made her first Road series comedy film Road to Singapore. The Road series films were popular during the 1940s. The sixth film in the series, Road to Bali, was released in 1952. By this time, Lamour's screen career had begun to wane, and she focused on stage and television work. In 1961, Crosby and Hope teamed up for The Road to Hong Kong, but actress Joan Collins was cast as the female lead. Lamour made a brief appearance and sang a song near the end of that film.

In the 1970s, Lamour revived her nightclub act, and in 1980, released her autobiography My Side of the Road. She made her final movie appearance in 1987.

Lamour married her second husband, William Ross Howard III, in 1943. They had two sons and remained married until Howard's death in 1978. Lamour died at her home in 1996 at the age of 81.

== Early life ==
Mary Leta Dorothy Slaton was born on December 10, 1914, at Charity ward at New Orleans East Hospital in New Orleans, the daughter of Carmen Louise (née LaPorte) and John Watson Slaton, (Note: State of Louisiana, Parish of Orleans, First City Court of New Orleans marriage license states name of groom as "John Wilson Slaton". His mother's was Leta Wilson (also noted on license).) both of whom were restaurant servers. Lamour was of Spanish descent, with some English, French and possibly also distant Irish as well. Her parents' marriage lasted only a few years. Her mother married for the second time to Clarence Lambour, whose surname Dorothy later adopted and modified as her stage name. That marriage also ended in divorce when Dorothy was a teenager.

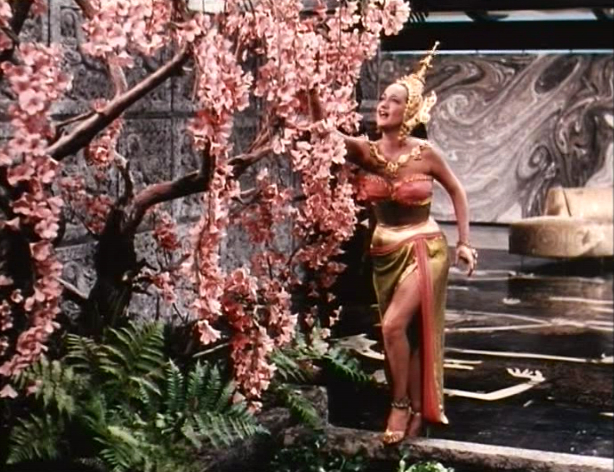
Lamour in Road to Bali (1952)

Raised in poverty by her single mother in the Lakeview neighborhood of New Orleans, Lamour often relied on the kindness of others during her early years. In a 1954 episode of the television show This Is Your Life, she emotionally recounted a moment from age eight when she visited Gordon’s Grocery, a corner store located at Harrison Avenue and Milne Street. Hoping to get a doll but finding none in stock, she was instead gifted a football by the store’s owner, Harrison Gordon, who refused to charge her. The unexpected act of generosity became one of Lamour’s most cherished childhood memories and was highlighted on the show as a reflection of the community support that helped shape her early life. Lamour quit school at age 14. After taking a business course, she worked as a secretary to support herself and her mother. She began entering beauty pageants, was crowned Miss New Orleans in 1931, and went on to compete in Galveston's Pageant of Pulchritude. Miss Lamour was close friends with Dorothy Dell, who was in the Ziegfeld Follies. Lamour used the prize money to support herself while she worked in a stock theatre company. She and her mother later moved to Chicago. Lamour found a job working at Marshall Field's department store, working as an elevator operator at the age of 16. Her boss, Douglas Singleterry, referred to her as "Dolly Face"; he also recalled that she spent a lot of her time auditioning around Chicago. She was discovered by orchestra leader Herbie Kay when he spotted her in performance at a Chicago talent show held at the Hotel Morrison. She had an audition the next day; Kay hired her as a singer for his orchestra and, in 1935, Lamour went on tour with him. Her work with Kay eventually led Lamour to vaudeville and work in radio. In 1935, she had her own 15-minute weekly musical program on NBC Radio. Lamour also sang on the popular Rudy Vallée radio show and The Chase and Sanborn Hour. On January 30, 1944, Lamour starred in "For This We Live", an episode of Silver Theater on CBS radio.

== Career ==
In 1936, Lamour moved to Hollywood. Around that time, Carmen married her third husband, Ollie Castleberry, and the family lived in Los Angeles. That same year, Lamour did a screen test for Paramount Pictures and signed a contract with them.

Lamour made her first film for Paramount, College Holiday (1936), in which she has a bit part as an uncredited dancer.

=== The Jungle Princess and "sarong" roles ===
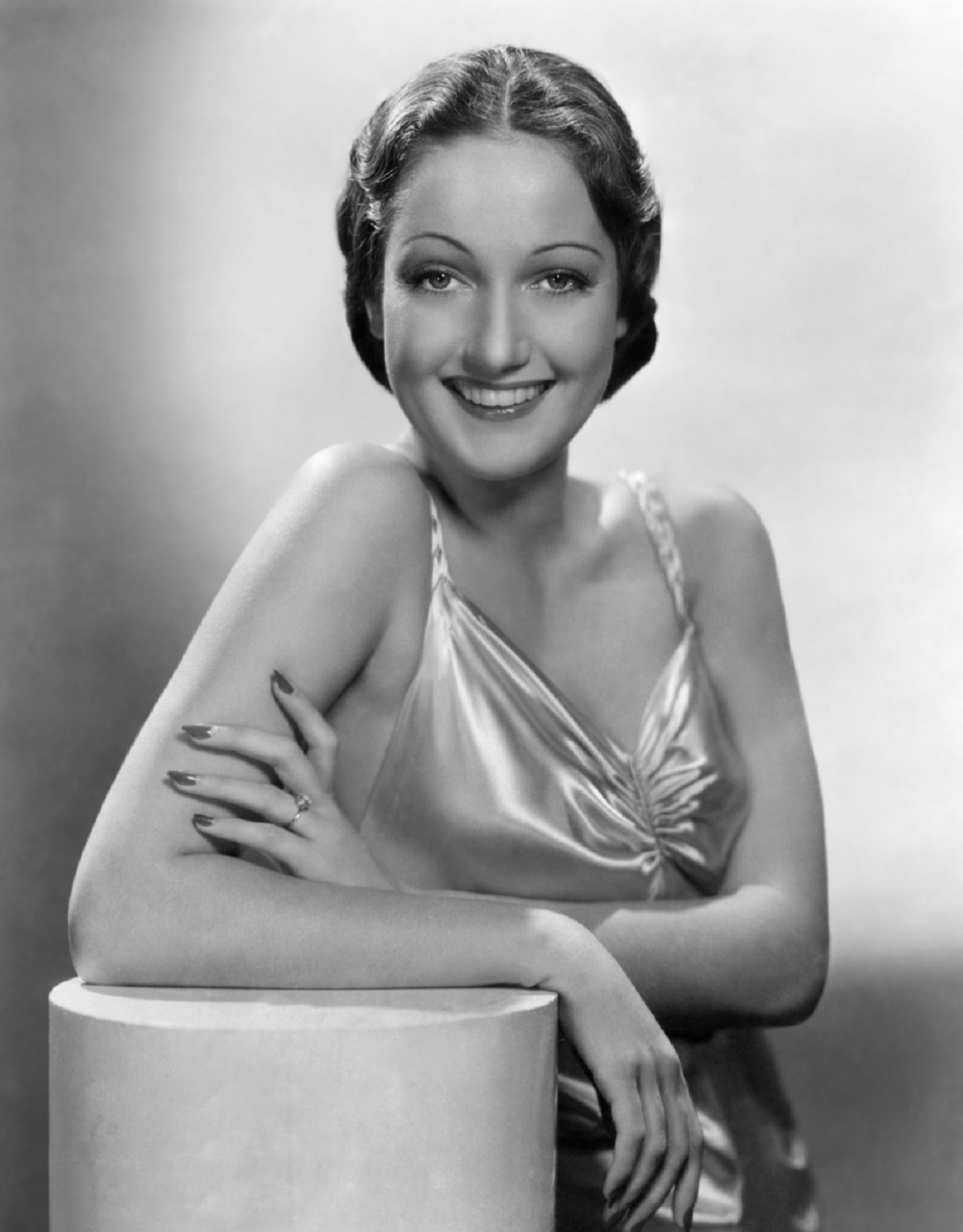
Publicity photo (1937)

Her second film for Paramount, The Jungle Princess (1936) with Ray Milland, solidified her fame. In the film, Lamour plays the role of "Ulah", a jungle native who wore an Edith Head-designed sarong throughout the film. The Jungle Princess was a big hit for the studio and Lamour would be associated with sarongs for the rest of her career. It also gave her a hit song, "Moonlight and Shadows".

She followed it with a support role in a Carole Lombard–Fred MacMurray musical Swing High, Swing Low (1937) where she got to sing "Panamania". She was top billed in The Last Train from Madrid (1937).

Lamour supported Irene Dunne and Randolph Scott in High, Wide and Handsome (1937), singing "The Things I Want". Sam Goldwyn borrowed her for John Ford's The Hurricane (1937), where she was back in a sarong playing an island princess alongside Jon Hall. Her swimming and diving scenes were handled by stunt double Lila Finn, who at one point dropped the sarong and was filmed diving into a lagoon in the nude. The film was a massive success and gave Lamour another hit song with "The Moon of Manakoora".

Lamour had a cameo in Thrill of a Lifetime (1937) and was third billed in The Big Broadcast of 1938 (1938) after W.C. Fields and Martha Raye; the cast also included Bob Hope in an early appearance.

Paramount reunited her with Milland and a sarong for Her Jungle Love (1938). Tropic Holiday (1938) cast her as a Mexican alongside Bob Burns, Raye and Milland, then she supported George Raft and Henry Fonda in the adventure film Spawn of the North (1938). Raft was meant to be Lamour's leading man in St. Louis Blues (1939) but he turned down the part and was replaced by Lloyd Nolan.

Lamour was Jack Benny's leading lady in the musical Man About Town (1939) then played a Chinese girl in a melodrama, Disputed Passage (1939).

=== The "Road" movies ===
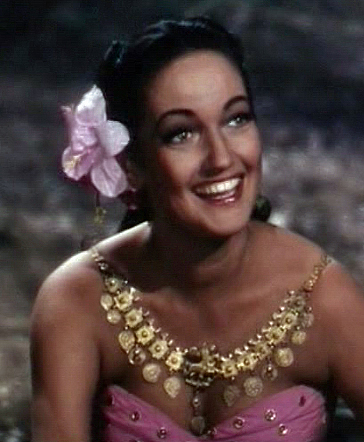
Lamour in Road to Bali (1952)

In 1940, Lamour starred in Road to Singapore, a spoof of Lamour's "sarong" films. It was originally meant to co-star Fred MacMurray and Jack Oakie, then George Burns and Gracie Allen, before Paramount decided to use Bob Hope and Bing Crosby; Lamour was billed after Crosby and above Hope. The two male stars began ad-libbing during filming. "I was trying to follow the script but just couldn't get my lines out", she said later. "Finally, I realised that I should just get the general idea of a scene rather than learn the words by heart, then go along with the boys." Said Hope, "Dottie is one of the bravest gals in pictures. She stands there before the camera and ad-libs with Crosby and me knowing that the way the script is written she'll come second or third best, but she fears nothing."

The movie was a solid hit and response to the team was enthusiastic.

20th Century Fox borrowed her to play Tyrone Power's leading lady in the gangster film Johnny Apollo (1940). She sang "This is the Beginning of the End" and "Dancing for Nickels and Dimes".

It was back to sarongs for Typhoon (1940). Her male co-star in the latter was Robert Preston who was also with Lamour in Moon Over Burma (1940). Fox borrowed her again for Chad Hanna (1941) with Henry Fonda.

Response to Road to Singapore had been such that Paramount reunited Lamour, Hope and Crosby in Road to Zanzibar (1941) which was even more successful and eventually led to a series of pictures (although from this point on Lamour was billed beneath Hope). She and Hope then did Caught in the Draft (1941) which was one of the biggest hits of the year.

Lamour was reunited with her old Hurricane star, Jon Hall, in Aloma of the South Seas (1941). She did a popular musical with Eddie Bracken, William Holden and Betty Hutton, The Fleet's In (1942), which gave her a hit song, "I Remember You.”

There was another sarong movie, Beyond the Blue Horizon (1942). Both were well liked by the public but neither was as popular as her third "Road" movie, Road to Morocco (1942).

Lamour was one of many Paramount stars who did guest shots in Star Spangled Rhythm (1942). She and Hope were borrowed by Sam Goldwyn for a comedy They Got Me Covered (1943), then she did one with Crosby without Hope, Dixie (1943), a popular biopic of Dan Emmett.

During World War II, Lamour was among the more popular pinup girls among American servicemen, along with Betty Grable, Rita Hayworth, Lana Turner, and Veronica Lake. Lamour was also known for her volunteer work, selling war bonds during tours in which movie stars would travel the country selling U.S. government bonds to the public. Lamour reportedly sold $300 million worth of bonds earning her the nickname "The Bond Bombshell". She also volunteered at the Hollywood Canteen where she would dance and talk to soldiers. In 1965, Lamour was awarded a belated citation from the United States Department of the Treasury for her war bond sales.

Lamour made Melody Inn (1943) with Dick Powell, then And the Angels Sing (1944) with Fred MacMurray and Hutton, where she sang "It Could Happen to You". She made one last sarong movie, Rainbow Island (1944), co-starring Bracken.

Lamour played a Mexican in A Medal for Benny (1945), based on a story by John Steinbeck, co-starring Arturo de Córdova. She was one of many Paramount stars to cameo in Duffy's Tavern (1945), then did a fourth "Road", Road to Utopia (1945), then Masquerade in Mexico (1945) with de Cordova.

She was in three big hits in a row: My Favorite Brunette (1947), a comedy with Hope; Wild Harvest (1947), a melodrama with Alan Ladd and Preston; and Road to Rio (1947). She also sang a duet with Ladd in Variety Girl (1947). Then she left Paramount.

=== After Paramount ===
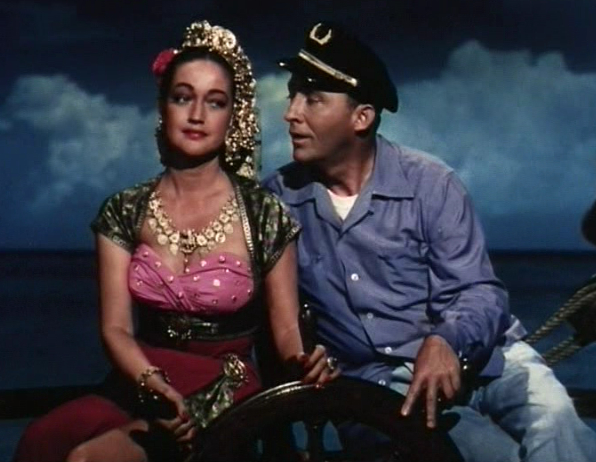
Lamour with Bing Crosby in Road to Bali (1952)

Lamour emceed Front and Center, a 1947 variety comedy show, as a summer replacement for The Fred Allen Show, with the Army Air Force recruiting as sponsors. The show changed to The Sealtest Variety Theater in September 1948.

After leaving Paramount, Lamour made a series of films for producer Benedict Bogeaus: the all-star comedy On Our Merry Way (1948); Lulu Belle (1948), a melodrama with George Montgomery; and The Girl from Manhattan (1948), also with Montgomery.

She tried two comedies: The Lucky Stiff (1949), produced by Jack Benny co-starring Brian Donlevy, then Slightly French (1949) with Don Ameche. Manhandled (1950) was a film noir with Dan Duryea for Pine-Thomas. None of these films were particularly popular.

Lamour played a successful season at the London Palladium in 1950 then was in two big hits: The Greatest Show on Earth (1952), Cecil B. De Mille's circus epic, and Road to Bali (1952). However this did not seem to lead to better film offers, and Lamour began concentrating on being a nightclub entertainer and a stage actress.

She also began working on television, guest starring on Damon Runyon Theater and was on Broadway in Oh Captain! (1958).

=== 1960s ===
Lamour returned to movies with a cameo in the final "Road" film, The Road to Hong Kong (1962); she was replaced as a love interest by Joan Collins because Bing Crosby wanted a younger actress. However, Bob Hope would not do the film without Lamour, so she appeared in an extended cameo.

She had a bigger part in John Ford's Donovan's Reef (1963) with John Wayne and Lee Marvin, and made guest appearances on shows like Burke's Law, I Spy and The Name of the Game, and films such as Pajama Party (1964) and The Phynx (1970).

Lamour moved to Baltimore with her family, where she appeared on TV and worked on the city's cultural commission. Then David Merrick offered her the chance to headline a road company of Hello Dolly! which she did for over a year near the end of the decade.

== Singing ==
Lamour starred in a number of movie musicals and sang in many of her comedies and dramatic films as well. For several years beginning in the late 1930s, Harriet Lee was her voice teacher. Lamour introduced a number of standards, including "The Moon of Manakoora", "I Remember You", "It Could Happen to You", "Personality", and "But Beautiful".

== Later years ==
=== 1970s ===
In the 1970s, Lamour was a popular draw at dinner theatres and in shows such as Anything Goes.

She guest starred on shows such as Marcus Welby, M.D. and The Love Boat and films like Won Ton Ton: The Dog Who Saved Hollywood (1976) and Death at Love House (1976). In 1977, she toured in the play Personal Appearance.

Her husband died in 1978, but she continued to work for "therapy".

=== 1980s ===
In 1980, Lamour published her autobiography My Side of the Road and revived her nightclub act.

During the remainder of the decade, she performed in plays and television shows such as Hart to Hart, Crazy Like a Fox, Remington Steele, and Murder, She Wrote.

In 1984, she toured in a production of Barefoot in the Park.

In 1986 she said "I'm still as busy at 71 as I was when I was just a slip of a girl. I do concerts, television and a lot of dinner theatre, where I sing old songs and talk about Bob and Bing and starting out at Paramount at $200 a week and working myself up to $450,000 a picture...I feel wonderful. Age is only in the mind and I'm grateful that God has taken care of me. And I'm very grateful for that sarong. It did a lot for me! But to be truthful, the sarong was never my favorite wearing apparel."

In 1987, she made her last big-screen appearance in the movie Creepshow 2, appearing with George Kennedy as an aging couple who are killed during a robbery. The wooden, Native American statue in front of their general store comes to life to avenge their death. The 72-year-old Lamour quipped: "Well, at my age you can't lean against a palm tree and sing 'Moon of Manakoora'", she said. "People would look at that and say 'What is she trying to do?'"

=== 1990s ===
During the 1990s, she made only a handful of professional appearances but remained a popular interview subject for publications and TV talk and news programs. Lamour's final stage performance was as "Hattie" in the Long Beach Civic Light Opera's 1990 production of Stephen Sondheim's "Follies".

In 1995, the musical Swinging on a Star, a revue of songs written by Johnny Burke (who wrote many of the most famous Road to ... movie songs as well as the score to Lamour's film And the Angels Sing (1944)) opened on Broadway and ran for three months; Lamour was credited as a "special advisor". It was nominated for the Best Musical Tony Award; the actress playing her in the road movie segment, Kathy Fitzgerald, also was nominated.

== Personal life ==
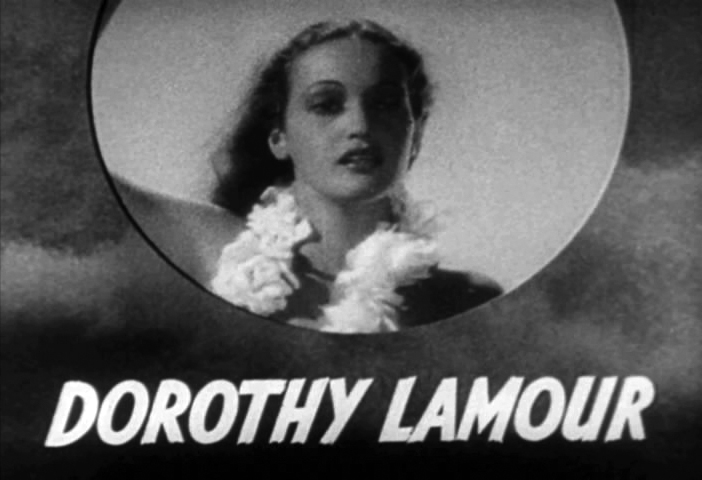
Lamour in The Hurricane (1937)

Lamour's first marriage was to orchestra leader Herbie Kay, with whose orchestra Lamour sang. The two married in 1935 and divorced in 1939.

Early in her career, Lamour met J. Edgar Hoover, director of the Federal Bureau of Investigation. According to Hoover's biographer Richard Hack, Hoover pursued a romantic relationship with Lamour, and the two spent a night together at a Washington, D.C., hotel. When Lamour was later asked if she and Hoover had a sexual relationship, she replied: "I cannot deny it." In her autobiography My Side of the Road (1980), Lamour does not discuss Hoover in detail; she refers to him only as "a lifelong friend".

On April 7, 1943, Lamour married Air Force captain and advertising executive William Ross Howard III in Beverly Hills. The couple had two sons: John Ridgely (1946–2018) and Richard Thomson Howard (born 1949).

In 1957, Lamour and Howard moved to the Baltimore, Maryland, suburb of Sudbrook Park. In 1962, the couple and their two sons moved to Hampton, another Baltimore suburb in Dulaney Valley, with their oldest son, John, attending Towson High School. She also owned a home in Palm Springs, California. Howard died in 1978.

Lamour was a registered Republican who supported the presidency of Ronald Reagan as well as Reagan's re-election in 1984.

== Death ==
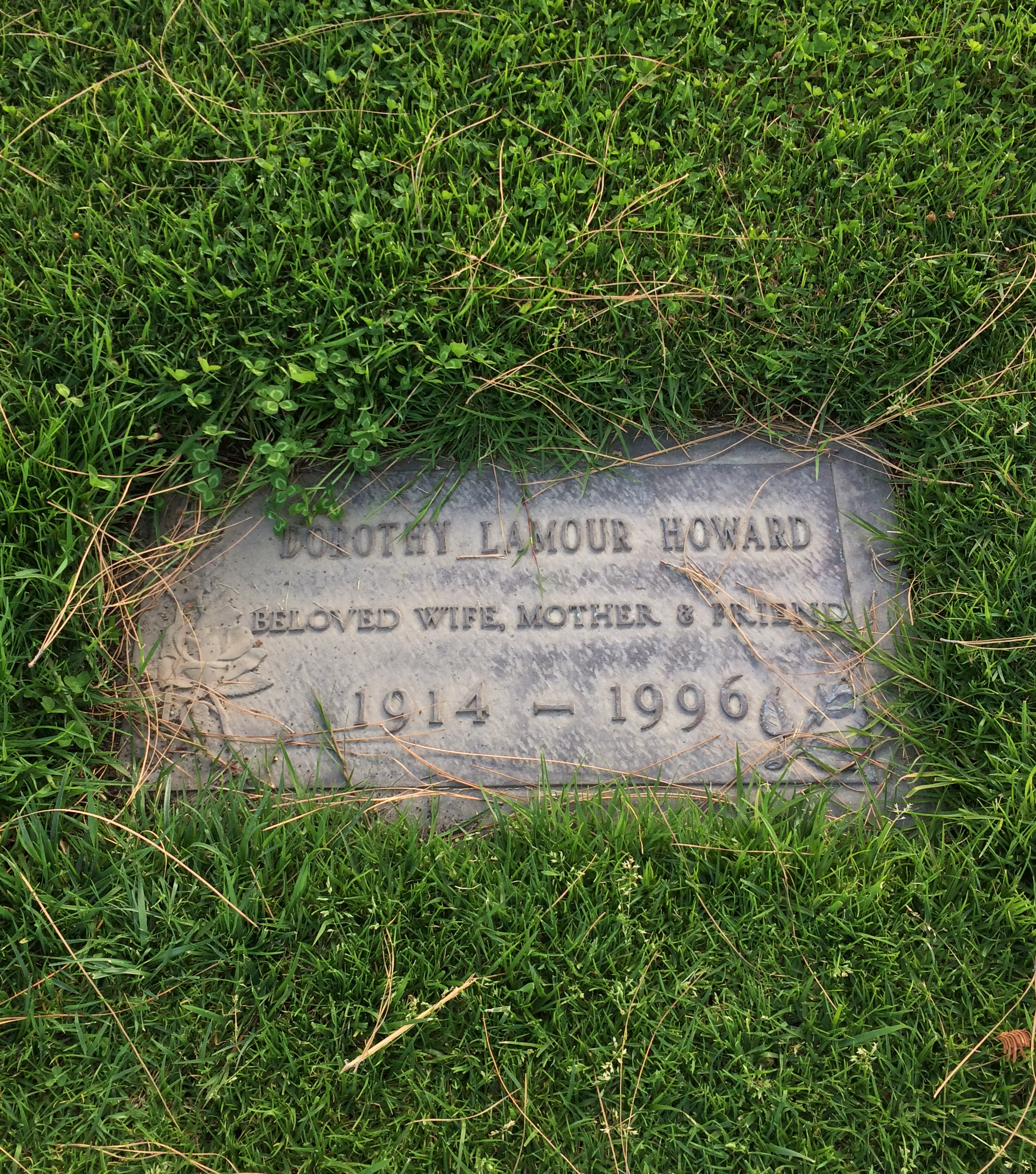
Grave of Dorothy Lamour, at Forest Lawn Hollywood Hills

Lamour died at her home in North Hollywood on September 22, 1996, from a heart attack, at the age of 81. Her funeral was held at St. Charles Catholic Church in North Hollywood, California, where she was a member. She was interred in the Forest Lawn, Hollywood Hills Cemetery in Los Angeles.

For her contribution to the radio and motion picture industry, Lamour has two stars on the Hollywood Walk of Fame. Her star for her radio contributions is located at 6240 Hollywood Boulevard, and her star for her motion picture contributions is located at 6332 Hollywood Boulevard.

== Filmography ==
=== Film ===
Year	Title	Role	Notes
1936	College Holiday	Dancer	uncredited
1936	The Jungle Princess	Ulah	
1937	Swing High, Swing Low	Anita Alvarez	
1937	The Last Train from Madrid	Carmelita Castillo	
1937	High, Wide, and Handsome	Molly Fuller	
1937	The Hurricane	Marama	
1937	Thrill of a Lifetime	Specialty	
1938	The Big Broadcast of 1938	Dorothy Wyndham	
1938	Her Jungle Love	Tura	
1938	Tropic Holiday	Manuela	
1938	Spawn of the North	Nicky Duval	
1939	St. Louis Blues	Norma Malone	
1939	Man About Town	Diana Wilson	
1939	Disputed Passage	Audrey Hilton	
1940	Road to Singapore	Mima	
1940	Johnny Apollo	Lucky Dubarry	
1940	Typhoon	Dea	
1940	Moon Over Burma	Arla Dean	
1940	Chad Hanna	Albany Yates / Lady Lillian	
1941	Road to Zanzibar	Donna Latour	
1941	Caught in the Draft	Antoinette "Tony" Fairbanks	
1941	Aloma of the South Seas	Aloma	
1942	The Fleet's In	The Countess	
1942	Star Spangled Rhythm	Herself	
1942	Beyond the Blue Horizon	Tama	
1942	Road to Morocco	Princess Shalmar	
1943	They Got Me Covered	Christina Hill	
1943	Dixie	Millie Cook	
1943	Riding High	Ann Castle	
1944	And the Angels Sing	Nancy Angel	
1944	Rainbow Island	Lona	
1945	A Medal for Benny	Lolita Sierra	
1945	Duffy's Tavern	Herself	
1945	Road to Utopia	Sal Van Hoyden	
1945	Masquerade in Mexico	Angel O'Reilly	
1947	My Favorite Brunette	Carlotta Montay	Alternative title: The Private Eye
1947	Variety Girl	Herself	
1947	Wild Harvest	Fay Rankin	
1947	Road to Rio	Lucia Maria de Andrade	
1948	On Our Merry Way	Gloria Manners	Alternative title: A Miracle Can Happen
1948	Lulu Belle	Lulu Belle	
1949	The Girl from Manhattan	Carol Maynard	
1949	The Lucky Stiff	Anna Marie St. Claire	
1949	Slightly French	Mary O'Leary	
1949	Manhandled	Merl Kramer	
1951	Here Comes the Groom	Herself	Uncredited
1952	The Greatest Show on Earth	Phyllis	
1952	Road to Bali	Princess Lala	
1962	The Road to Hong Kong	Herself	
1963	Donovan's Reef	Miss Laflour	
1964	Pajama Party	Head Saleslady	
1970	The Phynx	Herself	
1976	Won Ton Ton, the Dog Who Saved Hollywood	Visiting Film Star	
1987	Creepshow 2	Martha Spruce	(segment "Old Chief Wood'nhead"), (final film role)

=== Television ===
Year	Title	Role	Notes
1955	Damon Runyon Theater	Sally Bracken	Television debut Episode: "The Mink Doll"
1967	I Spy	Halima	Episode: "The Honorable Assassins"
1969	The Name of the Game	Stella Fisher	Episode: "Chains of Command"
1970	Love, American Style	Holly's Mother	Segment: "Love and the Pick-Up"
1971	Marcus Welby, M.D.	Mary DeSocio	Episode: "Echos from Another World"
1976	Death at Love House	Denise Christian	Television movie Alternative title: The Shrine of Lorna Love
1980	The Love Boat	Lil Braddock	Episode: "That's My Dad/The Captain's Bird/Captive Audience"
1984	Hart to Hart	Katherine Prince	Episode: "Max's Waltz"
1984	Remington Steele	Herself	Episode: "Cast in Steele"
1986	Crazy like a Fox	Rosie	Episode: "Rosie"
1987	Murder, She Wrote	Mrs. Ellis	Episode: "No Accounting for Murder"

== Broadway musicals ==
Year	Show
1958	Oh, Captain!
1995	Swinging on a Star

== Books ==
- My Side of the Road (As told to Dick McInnes). Autobiography. Englewood Cliffs, N.J: Prentice Hall. 1980.

== In popular culture ==
Lamour is the heroine of Matilda Bailey's young adult novel, Dorothy Lamour and the Haunted Lighthouse (1947), whose "heroine has the same name and appearance as the famous actress but has no connection ... it is as though the famous actress has stepped into an alternate reality in which she is an ordinary person." The story was written for a young teenage audience and is reminiscent of the adventures of Nancy Drew. It is part of a series known as "Whitman Authorized Editions", 16 books published between 1941 and 1947 that each featured a film actress as heroine.

She was featured in a brief print run of 2-3 issues during the 1950s, in Dorothy Lamour Jungle Princess Comics, a series of comic books dedicated to her on-film Jungle Princess persona (featuring screenshots from past movies as the covers).
