= Marquis Opera House =

- U.S. National Register of Historic Places
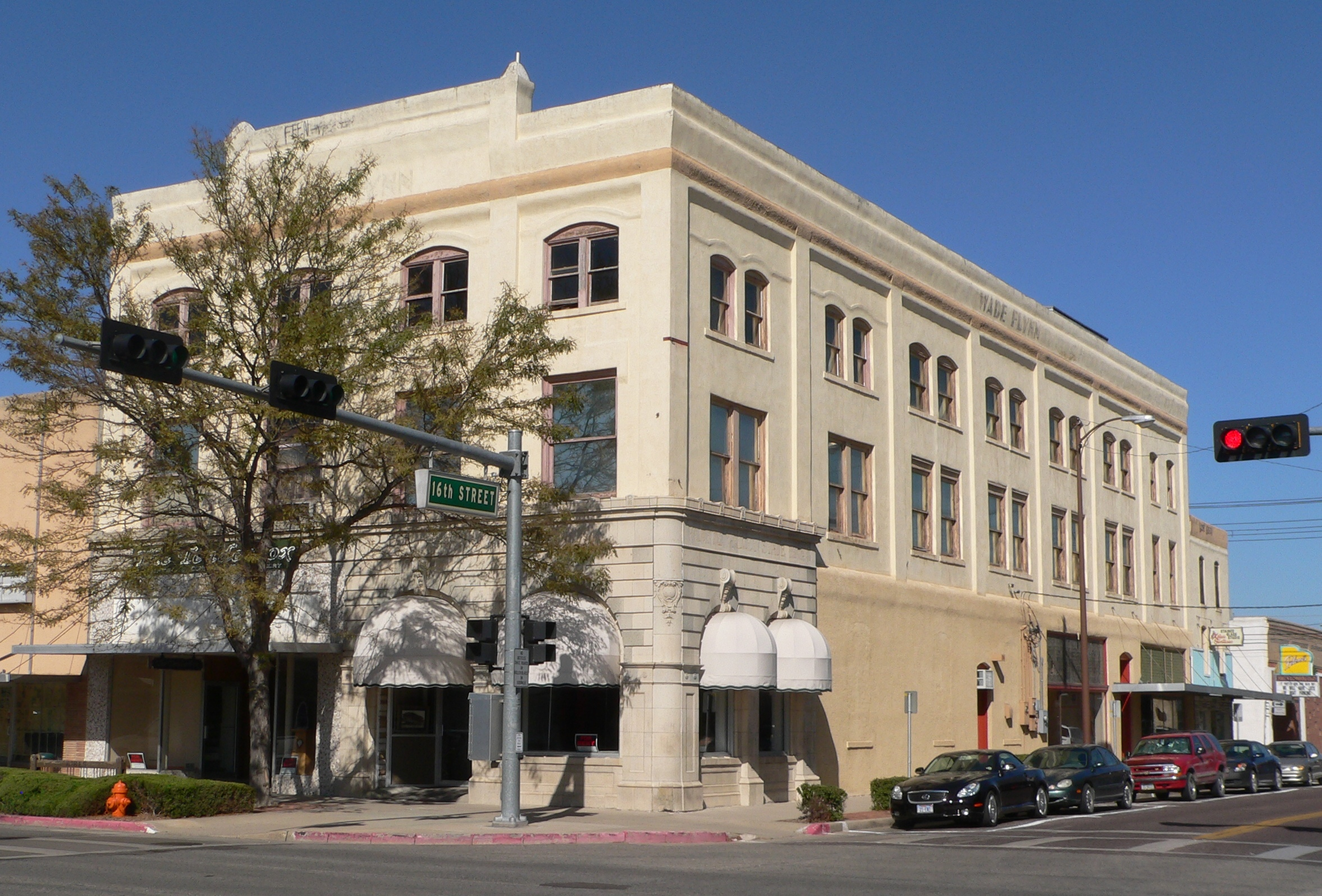
- The building in 2010

- Location within Nebraska Location within the United States
- Location: 1601--1603 Broadway, Scottsbluff, Nebraska
- Coordinates: 41°51′45″N 103°39′43″W
- Area: less than one acre
- Built: 1909
- Built by: L. C. Marquis; C. R. Inman
- Architectural style: Classical Revival
- NRHP reference No.: 85003103
- Added to NRHP: October 10, 1985

The Marquis Opera House is a historic building in Scottsbluff, Nebraska. It was first built by L. C. Marquis and C. R. Inman in 1909–10 as a theatre, with an auditorium inside. It closed down, and the building redesigned in the Classical Revival style in 1916. The auditorium was remodelled into floors for apartments and offices. The building has been listed on the National Register of Historic Places since October 10, 1985.
