= Midwest Theater =

- U.S. National Register of Historic Places
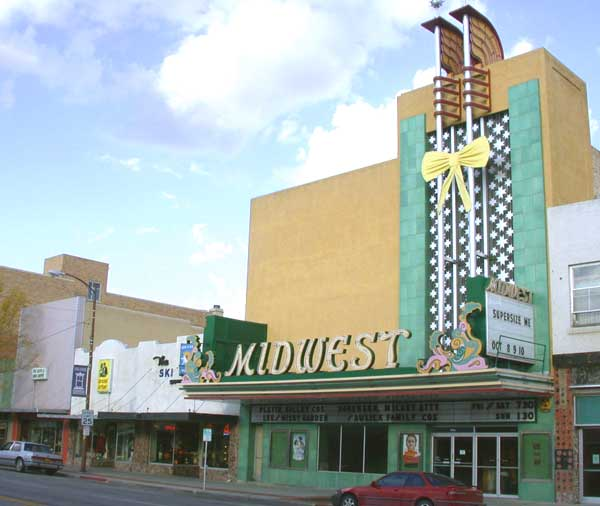

- Location within Nebraska Location within the United States
- Location: 1707 Broadway, Scottsbluff, Nebraska
- Coordinates: 41°51′49″N 103°39′44″W
- Area: less than one acre
- Built: 1946
- Built by: Moore, Art, Contracting Co.
- Architect: Strong, Charles D.
- Architectural style: Moderne
- NRHP reference No.: 97000728
- Added to NRHP: July 3, 1997

The Midwest Theater, at 1707 Broadway in Scottsbluff, Nebraska, was built in 1946. It was designed in Moderne style by Charles D. Strong and built by the Art Moore Contracting Co.. It was listed on the National Register of Historic Places in 1997.
