= Am I Right =

Music humor website

- Website type: Popular music/Internet humor
- Owners: Charles R. Grosvenor, Jr.
- Creators: Charles R. Grosvenor, Jr.
- Website: http://www.amiright.com
- Commercial: No
- Registration: Not required
- Launched: August 30, 2000
- Current status: Inactive; site archived in 2025

Am I Right was an American popular music and humor website dedicated to topics such as song parodies, misheard lyrics (mondegreens), and album cover parodies. Visitors could submit their own without registering. It was created by Charles R. Grosvenor Jr. (born July 7, 1972, known as Chucky G) The site was first launched March 23, 2000, and has since grown considerably.

Am I Right was a community based website, with all the content contained on the website created by visitors. New material was submitted online by individuals and reviewed by a group of moderators who removed entries that did not conform to community standards regarding obscene content or spam.

On February 13, 2025, Grosvenor announced that the site will stop accepting submissions by the end of February 2025 and be moved to a new server as a read-only archive. The final block of parodies was submitted on February 28, 2025. As of August 2025, it has yet to be known if the site will be taken offline in the future.

== Sections of the website ==
=== Song Parodies ===
The main part of the site where people write their own versions of popular songs. A voting system of 1 (worst) to 5 (best) enables readers to vote on how well it matches the pacing of the original song, how funny it is and its overall score. A 555 is a perfect score meaning the parody should be read by everyone while a 111 score means the parody is not funny, does not match the pacing and is pretty much pointless.

On March 8, 2024, this section of the site reached 100,000 parodies.

As stated above, the final entries were posted here on February 28, 2025.

=== Misheard lyrics ===
Since the website's inception, the site has offered the possibility for visitors to submit misheard lyrics, aka "mondegreens", to the site; these are displayed along with the true lyrics. As of October 11, 2007, there are a total of 101,716 misheard lyrics. There is a section where contributors admit their more embarrassing misheard lyric mishaps and the moment they came upon their mistakes. Another section associated with misheard lyrics includes "Misheard Lyrics in Film", where visitors recall moments where actors or actresses recall lyrics as misquoted by actors in either film or television from famous songs.

=== Comedy recordings ===
The recordings section is for recorded performances of parodies or other musical comedy pieces. Am I Right does not host the files, so the section is essentially an index of other sites that contain recordings. All entries in this section are submitted to the site by the original authors.

=== Album cover parodies ===
The Album Cover parody section lets people humorously edit an album cover from an original artist's album, using Amazon to scrape metadata and original album covers for users to edit and submit to the site.

=== Music trivia ===
This section is focused on strange and funny facts about various songs and performers. Most pages consist of songs of performers that have certain commonalities in common such as songs that have been banned, performers that have criminal records, or songs that have backwards messages recorded in them.

=== Names ===
This section deals with band name origins, pseudonyms, names of the offspring of famous musicians, song and band name parodies, user-created band names, inventive portmanteaus of individual band or performer names, inappropriate commercial soundtrack selections, proposed duets, inappropriate songs to play while on hold, adding, removing, or changing letters from titles to create new titles, lyrics that are literally impossible, and the use of song titles as questions and answers.

=== Real lyrics ===
The "real lyrics" section contains lyrics that fit certain categories, such as those which are "Misrhymed", "Insincere", or "Dirty".

== Publications ==
Two books which each gather over 500 misheard lyrics submitted to the site have been published. Hold Me Closer Tony Danza (and Other Misheard Lyrics) (October 28, 2007). Charles R. Grosvenor Jr, Sasquatch Books, ISBN 1-57061-533-0 and Hit Me With Your Pet Shark (and Other Misheard Lyrics) (October 1, 2008). Charles R. Grosvenor Jr, Sasquatch Books, ISBN 1-57061-576-4

Each book has several pages with information pulled from the various sections of the site including:

- Add a Letter to a Song Title
- Change a Letter in a Song Title
- Remove a Letter in a Song Title
- What if Groups Merged
- Song Mash Ups
- Songs to Respond to Other Songs
- Bad Choices For On-Hold Music

== Reception ==
Am I Right has been mentioned in various articles and other publications over the years.

- In May 2005, Spin Magazine voted Am I Right as one of "Four Amazing Rock Websites", noting, "This compedium of thousands of song parodies even features spoofs of "Weird Al" Yankovic. How positively meta."
- On October 25, 2005, Askmen.com listed Am I Right as one of the "Best & Coolest Sites Around." Am I Right received a rating of 7/10, saying, "This site has tons of music-related information like misheard lyrics, cool band names, etc. The song parodies are hilarious -- if you like Weird Al, you'll appreciate these."
- Am I Right was mentioned in the Chicago Tribune as one of the 50 Best Web Sites in the Arts and Culture. The Tribune described Am I Right as "really funny."
- On September 24, 2006, the EZHelp radio show interviewed Chucky G about Am I Right and its sister web sites. The show claims that Am I Right has been featured in such publications as "USA Today, New York Press, Entertainment Weekly, and US News Magazine to name a few."
